= Liu Xuan (Han-Zhao) =

Han Zhao politician

- 劉宣

Prime minister (丞相)
- In office 304–308
- Monarch: Liu Yuan

Grand marshal (大司馬)
- In office ?–308
- Monarch: Liu Yuan

Personal details
- Born: Unknown
- Died: 4 December 308 Xi County, Shanxi
- Relations: Yufuluo (brother); Huchuquan (brother); Liu Yuan (great-nephew)
- Parent: Qiangqu (father)
- Courtesy name: Shize (士則)

Liu Xuan (died 4 December 308), courtesy name Shize, was a Xiongnu politician of the Jin dynasty and Han-Zhao dynasty during the Sixteen Kingdoms period. In 304, he joined a plot led by the Xiongnu aristocracy to break away from the ruling Jin dynasty. He was important in getting his great-nephew, Liu Yuan, to lead the Xiongnu and form Han-Zhao. After the state's establishment, Liu Xuan became its first prime minister and played an influential role in its administration.

== Life ==
=== Background and early life ===
Liu Xuan was a member of the ruling-Luandi clan of the Xiongnu empire. In 50 AD, after the empire was split into two, the southern branch of the Xiongnu surrendered to the Han dynasty and moved into their northern frontiers, becoming a vassal state known as the Southern Xiongnu. According to the Book of Jin, Liu Xuan was the great-uncle of Liu Yuan, which implies that he was also the son of Qiangqu, and the brother of Yufuluo and Huchuquan, all three who were chanyus of the Southern Xiongnu. During the fall of Han, the Southern Xiongnu and their Xiuchuge allies ousted the chanyu family from their territory and eventually dissolved their state. In 216, the warlord-statesman, Cao Cao had the last chanyu, Huchuquan detained at Ye and reorganized the remaining vestiges of the Southern Xiongnu into the Five Divisions. After Huchuquan's death, the chanyu position became vacant.

The Book of Jin describes Liu Xuan as a simple and quiet person, but also one who was eager to learn and cultivate. He gained an appreciation for Han culture, and studied under a scholar from Le'an Commandery, Sun Yan. Liu Xuan proved to be an exceptional student, and was compared by his teacher to the Xiongnu minister, Jin Midi. He was familiar with the Mao Commentary and Zuo Zhuan, and from his reading of the Book of Han, he idolized the famed officials, Xiao He and Deng Yu. After completing his studies, he returned to his hometown and lived in recluse for many years.

=== Service under the Jin dynasty ===
During the early days of the Jin dynasty, the Inspector of Bingzhou, Wang Guang, recommended Liu Xuan to Emperor Wu of Jin. Following a meeting between the two, Emperor Wu became impressed by Liu Xuan's character, and so appointed him as Commander of the Right Tribe. During his tenure, Liu Xuan was well-loved by his tribe due to his integrity. Afterwards, he became Chief Commandant of the Northern Division and Worthy Prince of the Right.

=== Rebellion against Jin ===
Between 300 and 306, northern China was engulfed in civil wars due to the War of the Eight Princes. During the Cao Wei and Jin dynasty, the Xiongnu nobles, including Liu Xuan, began to resent their subservient status. In 304, taking advantage of the civil war, they began plotting to break away from Jin, and Liu Xuan played vital part in their planning. During a secret meeting, Liu Xuan said to the conspirators:

“In the past, our ancestors and those of the Han acted like brothers through joy and sorrow. However, since the fall of Han and the rise of Wei and Jin, our titles of chanyu have no value, and we have not gained a foot of land since. Although we have been bestowed with many noble ranks, our households are all equally low. Our numbers may have dwindled, but we are still no less than 20,000 strong, so why then should we continue to bow our heads in servitude and live in fear for another hundred years?”

Liu Xuan also recommended that they choose his great-nephew, the Worthy Prince of the Left, Liu Yuan, to become their leader. The conspirators accepted and acclaimed Liu Yuan as their grand chanyu. During this time, Liu Yuan was a general of the Prince of Chengdu, Sima Ying in Yecheng. The Xiongnu then sent an affiliate, Huyan You, to inform him of the plot, which Liu Yuan agreed. However, he initially failed to convince Sima Ying to let him return home, so he ordered Huyan You to instruct Liu Xuan and the conspirators to rally the five tribes first. After receiving permission, Liu Yuan went to Lishi (in modern Lüliang, Shanxi), where Liu Xuan and the others saluted him as grand chanyu.

Shortly after returning to the Xiongnu, Sima Ying was defeated by the Jin warlord, Wang Jun, with the help of the Xianbei and Wuhuan. Liu Yuan contemplated attacking the Xianbei and Wuhuan, but Liu Xuan and other Xianbei leaders objected, seeing them as potential allies. They instead proposed that he shift his focus entirely on Jin and elevate himself to the same standing as the chanyu, Huhanye. Although Liu Yuan took their advice, he added that instead of following Huhanye, he should strive to be like Emperor Gaozu of Han and Cao Cao. Hearing this declaration, Liu Xuan and the others kowtowed and exclaimed that Liu Yuan had surpassed all three.

=== Service under Han-Zhao ===
Later in 304, Liu Yuan established his state of Han (renamed Zhao in 319) and named himself King of Han. Liu Xuan and the others wanted him to proclaim him as emperor, but Liu Yuan preferred to follow in Emperor Gaozu’s footsteps. Because Liu Xuan had been pivotal in getting him on the throne, Liu Yuan greatly appreciated and respected him. Thus, Liu Xuan became the state’s first prime minister. For the next four years, he was heavily involved in the state’s military as well as foreign and domestic affairs. It was said that no one in Han, including his other relatives, was able to reach his level of achievements.

Soon, Liu Xuan also became grand marshal and chief controller of all military affairs. In 308, he, along with 64 other officials, finally convinced Liu Yuan to declare himself emperor. However, just one month after Liu Yuan’s declaration, Liu Xuan died of natural causes on 4 December 308. If he was indeed Liu Yuan's great-uncle and Qiangqu's son, he would have lived up to at least 120, as Qiangqu died in 188.
