= Liu Bao =

3rd-century Five Divisions of Xiongnu leader

- Traditional Chinese: 劉豹
- Simplified Chinese: 刘豹
Transcriptions

Liu Bao (fl. 195–274) was a leader of the Five Divisions who lived during the late Eastern Han dynasty and Three Kingdoms period of China. His son, Liu Yuan, founded the Han-Zhao dynasty during the Sixteen Kingdoms period.

== Life ==
According to official history, Liu Bao was a member of the Luandi clan as the son of the Southern Xiongnu chanyu, Yufuluo. Yufuluo had been forced into exile in 188, after Southern Xiongnu rebels allied with the Xiuchuge people killed his father, Qiangqu. When Yufuluo died in 195, his younger brother Huchuquan inherited the position of chanyu in accordance with the lateral succession order and appointed Liu Bao as the Wise Prince of the Left (or Wise Prince of the Right).

In 216, Huchuquan travelled to Ye (present-day Handan, Hebei) to receive nominal titles from the Han dynasty imperial court and remained in city as an honoured prisoner. The Han chancellor, Cao Cao gathered the last vestiges of the Southern Xiongnu and reorganized them into the Five Divisions around Taiyuan Commandery in Bing province. The Five Divisions were placed under the supervision of Huchuquan's uncle, Qubei, and each of the Five Divisions had their own commander, with Liu Bao commanding the Left Division. They later became a vassal to the Cao Wei dynasty after they replaced the Han in 220.

During the Jiaping era (249–254), Liu Bao unified the Five Divisions and began mustering a great force. His activities caught the attention of the Wei general, Deng Ai, who urged the paramount ruler, Sima Shi to intervene. Sima Shi accepted his suggestions, but it would not be until the Xianxi era (264–266) when Liu Bao's followers were re-split into three and then four. Liu Bao was also forced to send his son, Liu Yuan to the imperial capital, Luoyang, as a hostage to prevent him from rebelling. Soon, Liu Bao's followers were once again living as the Five Divisions.

Liu Bao died some time after the outbreak of Tufa Shujineng's Rebellion (270–280), with modern historian, Tang Changru (唐长孺) estimating that he died in 274. After his death, Emperor Wu of Jin appointed Liu Yuan to succeed him as Commander of the Left Division. Liu Yuan and the Five Divisions later went on to established the Han-Zhao dynasty in 304.

== Skepticism and theories on lineage ==
Some modern Chinese scholars like Tang Changru and Chen Yong (陈勇) cast doubt on the claim that Liu Bao was Yufuluo's son, asserting that Liu Yuan had forged his genealogy to the chanyu lineage for imperial legitimacy. Among the reasons that Tang pointed out was the long time span from to time when Liu Bao became Wise Prince of the Left in 195 (assuming he was 20) to his approximate death in 274. Contemporary historical texts also reveal that Liu Yuan and his family were frequently referred to as "Chuge" by their enemies. The Chuge or Xiuchuge were a distinct ethnic group believed to be descended from the people of King Xiutu, a Xiongnu vassal king in modern-day Gansu who surrendered to the Han dynasty in 121 BCE more than a century before the Southern Xiongnu. Chen theorized that Liu Bao was likely the chieftain of a Chuge tribe from the outer frontier of Bing province who succeeded in annexing the Five Divisions in 251–252 and had no relation to the chanyus. Other scholars such as Zhou Weizhou (周伟洲) maintain that Liu Yuan's genealogy was genuine and rebut Tang's argument as conjecture. As the Xiongnu people increasingly began to miscegenate with other groups during this time, Zhou asserted that the Chuge had simply became the primary identity and blanket term for the sinicized Xiongnu, including the chanyu family.

Liu Bao may have also been the Wise Prince of the Left who took the poet Cai Wenji as his concubine after Li Jue's coup in Chang'an in 195. The pair would go on to have two children. However, the powerful warlord Cao Cao arrived and paid a heavy ransom to Liu Bao, demanding that he release Cai Wenji, to which Liu Bao did without hesitation. However, it is highly uncertain if the Wise Prince of the Left was indeed Liu Bao, given that the records do not mention him by name, that he may have instead been the Wise Prince of the Right, and that there are doubts regarding his relationship to Yufuluo.

== Personal information ==
- Wife
  - Lady Huyan (呼延氏)
- Children
  - Liu Yannian (劉延年); Prince of Jiangdu
  - Liu Yuan (劉淵); Emperor of the Han-Zhao dynasty (c. 250 – 29 August 310)
  - Liu Xiong (劉雄); Prince of Wei
  - Liu Sheng (劉盛); Prince of Anchang (died 310)
  - Liu Qin (劉欽); Prince of Anyi (died 310)

== See also ==
- Lists of people of the Three Kingdoms
