= Liu Meng (Xiongnu) =

Southern Xiongnu leader during the Jin dynasty (266–420)

- Traditional Chinese: 劉猛
- Simplified Chinese: 刘猛
Transcriptions
Standard Mandarin
- Hanyu Pinyin: Liú měng
- Wade–Giles: liu meng

Liu Meng (died February or March 272) was a leader of the Five Divisions in Bing province during the Jin dynasty. In 271, he led a rebellion against the Jin but was defeated and killed the following year.

== Life ==
According to the Book of Wei, Liu Meng was the son of Qubei, a member of the imperial Luandi clan of the Southern Xiongnu who was appointed by the Chinese court to supervise the Five Divisions of Xiongnu in Bing province. However, a much later and dubious account from the New Book of Tang instead claim that he was Qubei's brother.

A memorial sent by the Cao Wei general, Deng Ai in the 250s indicates that after Qubei's death, his son was not allowed to inherit his domain. To curb the growing power of the Xiongnu leader, Liu Bao, Deng recommended for Qubei's son to be given a title and garrisoned at Yanmen Pass. Liu Meng did possess a title during the Jin dynasty, but there are contradicting accounts on what exactly that title was. According to different volumes in the Book of Jin, he was either the Leader of the Xiongnu (匈奴帥), the Leader of the Central Tribe (中部帥), the Right Virtuous King (右賢王), or the Chanyu (單于), although the last title is likely a mistake, as it was abolished at the end of Huchuquan's reign in 216. Additionally, the Book of Wei also states that he was the Leader of the Northern Tribe (北部帥).

In 271, Liu Meng began a rebellion against the Jin. He went beyond the Great Wall and established a base in Kongxie city. At the end of the year, he led his forces to invade Bing province but suffered defeat to the provincial inspector, Liu Qin. In early 272, the Army Supervisor, He Zhen, campaigned against Liu Meng and defeated him multiple times. In the end, the Commander of the Left Tribe, Li Ke, was bribed into defecting to the Jin and had Liu Meng assassinated, ending his rebellion.

When Liu Meng died, his son, Liu Fulun fled to the Tuoba-Xianbei tribe, where he and his descendants intermarried with the ruling Tuoba clan and became known as the Dugu tribe. Meanwhile, Liu Meng's followers were taken over by his brother, Liu Gaoshengyuan. These people later became the Tiefu tribe after Gaoshengyuan's son, Liu Hu, came to power in 309.

== Sources ==
- Wei, Shou (554). Book of Wei (Wei Shu).
- Fang, Xuanling (ed.) (648). Book of Jin (Jin Shu).
- Ouyang, Xiu (1060). New Book of Tang (Xin Tang Shu).
