= Liu Hu (Tiefu) =

Tiefu-Xiongnu chieftain

Liu Hu (劉虎) (died c.November 341), also known as Wulugu (烏路孤), posthumously named Emperor Jing (景皇帝), was a Tiefu-Xiongnu chieftain during the Sixteen Kingdoms period. He was the founder of the Tiefu tribe and was the great-grandfather of the Helian Xia state's first emperor, Helian Bobo. Due to Tang dynasty naming taboo, he is referred to as Liu Wu (劉武) in the Book of Jin.

== Life ==
Liu Hu was a descendant of the Southern Xiongnu chanyus and the grandson of the Right Virtuous King (or Left Virtuous King according to the Book of Wei), Qubei. In 272, Liu Hu's uncle, the Right Virtuous King, Liu Meng, was killed after his rebellion in Bingzhou against the ruling Jin dynasty, allowing Liu Hu's father, Liu Gaoshengyuan, to take charge of his people. Following Gaoshengyuan's death in 309, Liu Hu succeeded him and founded a tribe he named the "Tiefu" (鐵弗), a word used to refer to people with a Xiongnu father and a Xianbei mother.

Initially, Liu Hu submitted to the neighbouring Tuoba-Xianbei tribe, but in 310, after amassing enough followers, he revolted against them. At the same time, the Bai tribe of the Xianbei had also raised an army, so Liu Hu allied with them to attack Xinxing (north of present-day Xinzhou, Shanxi) and Yanmen commanderies, which were governed by the Jin Inspector of Bingzhou, Liu Kun. In response, Liu Kun requested the Tuoba tribe for reinforcements, to which the chieftain, Tuoba Yilu, sent 20,000 cavalry units under Tuoba Yulü to assist him. Liu Kun and Yulü routed Liu Hu and the Bai, killing many in their camps and tribes. Liu Hu fled west to Shuofang Commandery by crossing the Yellow River and offered his submission to the Xiongnu-led Han-Zhao state. The emperor of Han, Liu Cong, considered Liu Hu to be a member of his clan, so he conferred him the title of Duke of Loufan. He was also appoint General Who Stabilises the North, General of the Household, Gentlemen of the Dingling and Chief Controller of the Xianbei.

In 318, Liu Hu marched from Shuofang to attack Dai, the Tuoba tribe's state. However, he was badly defeated by the Prince of Dai, Tuoba Yulü and forced to flee north of the Great Wall. His nephew, Liu Lugu took his own followers to surrender to Dai, where he married a daughter of Tuoba Yulü.

In 341, Liu Hu attacked Dai on its western borders but was once again routed after the Prince of Dai, Tuoba Shiyiqian, sent an army to deal with him. Liu Hu barely escaped with his life, but soon died of natural causes and was succeeded by his son, Liu Wuhuan. After Liu Hu's great-grandson, Helian Bobo established Xia in 407, he was posthumously honored as Emperor Jing.

Liu Hu Tiefu Born: ? Died: 341
Regnal titles
Preceded by Liu Gaoshengyuan	Chieftain of the Tiefu; 309–341	Succeeded by Liu Wuhuan
