= Marquis of Xubu =

- Chanyu
- Reign: 188–189 AD
- Predecessor: Yufuluo
- Successor: Yufuluo (in exile)
- House: Xubu

Marquis of Xubu
- Traditional Chinese: 須卜骨都侯
- Simplified Chinese: 须卜骨都侯
Transcriptions
Standard Mandarin
- Hanyu Pinyin: Xūbu gǔdōuhóu

The Marquis of Xubu (died 189) was a chanyu of the Southern Xiongnu during the late period of the Han dynasty. He was installed by a rebellious faction of the Southern Xiongnu after they killed the previous chanyu, Qiangqu and ousted his son, Yufuluo.

== History ==
In 188 AD, the Xiuchuge people and a part of the Southern Xiongnu rebelled in Bing province, killing the Chinese provincial inspector and their chanyu, Qiangqu. Initially, Qiangqu's son, Yufuluo was installed as the new chanyu, but soon, the rebellious faction ousted him and replaced him with a marquis of the Xubu clan whose is known today as the Marquis of Xubu. Yufuluo went to the Han capital, Luoyang to complain, but at the time, the capital was thrown into chaos by the death of Emperor Ling. When Yufuluo returned to Bing, the rebels refused him entry, and he was forced to camp at Hedong Commandery east of the Fen River.

The Marquis of Xubu did not reign long, as he died in 189. After his death, his followers retired the chanyu position and installed an elderly king with nominal power, although Yufuluo and later his brother, Huchuquan continued to claim the position in exile.

== External sources ==
- Barfield, Thomas (1989), The Perilous Frontier: Nomadic Empires and China, Basil Blackwell
- Bichurin N.Ya., "Collection of information on peoples in Central Asia in ancient times", vol. 1, p. 146, Sankt Petersburg, 1851, reprint Moscow-Leningrad, 1950 (Qian Han Shu Ch. 94b)
- Chang, Chun-shu (2007), The Rise of the Chinese Empire 1, The University of Michigan Press
- Chen, Yong (2007), The Failure of the Superintendence of Qubei and the Rise of Liu Bao of the Chuge
- Cosmo, Nicola Di (2002), Ancient China and Its Enemies, Cambridge University Press
- Cosmo, Nicola di (2009), Military Culture in Imperial China, Harvard University Press
- de Crespigny, Rafe (2007). A Biographical Dictionary of Later Han to the Three Kingdoms 23-220 AD. Leiden: Brill. ISBN 9789004156050.
- de Crespigny, Rafe (2017), Fire Over Luoyang: A History of the Later Han Dynasty, 23-220 AD, Brill
- de Crespigny, Rafe (2018), Northern Frontier: The Policies and Strategy of the Later Han Empire, The Australian National University, Faculty of Asian Studies
- Loewe, Michael (2000), A Biographical Dictionary of the Qin, Former Han, and Xin Periods, Brill
- Tang, Changru (2010), Miscellaneous Studies on Wei, Jin, Southern and Northern Dynasties History, Commercial Press, ISBN 9787100074513
- Taskin B.S., "Materials on Sünnu history", Science, Moscow, 1968, p. 31 (In Russian)
- Whiting, Marvin C. (2002), Imperial Chinese Military History, Writers Club Press

Preceded by Yufuluo	Chanyu of the southern Xiongnu; 188–189 AD	Extinct; Yufuluo (in exile)
