= Guan Jing =

General serving warlord Gongsun Zan (died 199)

- 關靖

Chief Clerk (長史) (under Gongsun Zan)
- In office ? – 199
- Monarch: Emperor Xian of Han

Personal details
- Born: Unknown; Taiyuan, Shanxi
- Died: 199; Xiong County, Hebei
- Occupation: Official
- Courtesy name: Shiqi (士起)

Guan Jing (died 199), courtesy name Shiqi, was an official serving under the warlord Gongsun Zan during the late Eastern Han dynasty of China. In 198, during Yuan Shao's invasion in the Battle of Yijing, Gongsun Zan wished to ride out and cut off Yuan Shao's rear, but Guan Jing recommended against this action, and for Gongsun Zan to stay within the city of Yijing. In 199, Yuan Shao tricked and ambushed Gongsun Zan as the latter rode out, expecting to meet reinforcements from Gongsun Zan's son Gongsun Xu and Zhang Yan. After this defeat, Gongsun Zan committed suicide by self-immolation. Guan Jing expressed regret that he could not convince Gongsun Zan to stay in the end, and rode into the army of Yuan Shao and died.

== See also ==
- Lists of people of the Three Kingdoms
