= Gepo Campaign =

Campaign by Shi Le against the Western Jin (312)

- Part of the Upheaval of the Five Barbarians
Date	February or March – July or August 312
Location	Henan, Anhui and Hebei
Result	Jin victory; Shi Le occupies Xiangguo

Belligerents
Han-Zhao	Western Jin

Commanders and leaders
Shi Le; Zhang Bin	Sima Rui; Ji Zhan; Liu Yan

Strength
Unknown	Unknown

Casualties and losses
Heavy	Unknown

Gepo Campaign
- Chinese: 葛陂之役
Transcriptions
Standard Mandarin
- Hanyu Pinyin: Gépō zhī yì

The Gepo Campaign, or the Ge Slope Campaign, was launched by the Han-Zhao general, Shi Le against the Western Jin dynasty from February to July 312. The initial objective of the campaign was to conquer the Jianghuai region, which was controlled by the Prince of Langya, Sima Rui. However, due to severe famine and plague within his army, Shi Le was forced to turn back north in search for a stable base. The campaign concluded in Jin victory but also saw the end of Shi Le's time as a roving commander as he established a base at the city of Xiangguo.

== Background ==
In mid-311, the Han-Zhao general, Shi Le annihilated the imperial Jin army at the Battle of Ningping. Subsequently, Han forces led by Wang Mi and Liu Yao captured Luoyang and Emperor Huai of Jin in the Disaster of Yongjia. Though the Han had finally won a monumental victory over the Jin, internal strife continued to plague them, in particular the growing ambition of Shi Le. Not long after the fall of Luoyang, Shi Le assassinated Wang Mi at a banquet and absorbed his forces. The Han emperor, Liu Cong was furious, but in reality, his court in Pingyang only had nominal control over affairs outside the Shanxi region. He was forced to tolerate Shi Le's actions, in turn affirming Shi Le's authority over Han forces to the east of Shanxi.

Meanwhile, to the south of the Yangzi river, the Jin Prince of Langya, Sima Rui was consolidating his rule over Yang province with the help of the cousins, Wang Dao and Wang Dun, along with the native southern gentry clans. He had avoided sending troops to help fight the Han in the north, but his dominion became a safe haven for northern emigres fleeing from the war. Following the disaster, he was appointed leader of the Jin alliance and granted imperial power to appoint and dismiss major officials by a provisional government led by the Minister of Works, Xun Fan. The prince capitalized on his new powers by ousting the Jin inspectors of Jiang and Yu provinces and installing officials loyal to his regime.

Shi Le had ambitions to control the regions around the Yangzi and Han rivers; he had previously campaigned against the rebel, Wang Ru and reached as far south as Xiangyang in 310, but was forced to turn back north at the advice of his Commandant of Army Advisors, Zhang Bin, as hunger and plague killed more than half of his soldiers. In November 311, Shi Le led his forces to pillage Yu province, reaching the banks of the Yangzi before turning back to camp at Gepo (葛陂; northwest of present-day Xincai County, Henan). There, he rejected an offer to defect from the Jin Inspector of Bing province, Liu Kun, even despite returning his mother, Lady Wang (王氏), and adopted brother, Shi Hu. Shi Le initially attacked Xingyang near Luoyang, but after he was badly defeated in an ambush by the local Jin administrator, Li Ju, he turned his sights once more to the south.

== The campaign ==
=== Stalemate at Shouchun ===
In February or March 312, Shi Le began fortifying his camp, farming and building ships in preparation to attack Sima Rui's base at Jianye. In response, Sima Rui gathered all his soldiers at Shouchun and placed them under the command of his General Who Displays Might, Ji Zhan. However, Shi Le's campaign quickly turned for the worse as great storms appeared and heavy raining persisted into the following month. More than half of his men died of starvation or disease, and he was also receiving several proclamations from Sima Rui's sides stating their intention to attack. Thus, Shi Le gathered his generals for an emergency council.

His Chief Clerk of the Right, Diao Ying (刁膺), suggested they feign submission to Sima Rui; once the Jin army withdraws, they would have ample time to plan their next step. His general, Kui An, urged that they move to higher ground to avoid the waters. Kong Chang, along with more than 30 other generals, volunteered to launch a daring night attack on Shouchun. Shi Le rejected all their proposals. He then consulted Zhang Bin, who advised him:

"General, you have captured the imperial capital, imprisoned the Son of Heaven, murdered his princes and violated his women. The hair on your head will not be enough to count the crimes you have committed, so how can you consider serving as their minister? We should not have come here after you killed Wang Mi last year, and now Heaven is heavily pouring rain for hundreds of lis around telling you not to remain here. Ye boasts the fortifications of the Three Terraces, bordering Pingyang to the west and surrounded by mountains and rivers. March north and capture it, then all of Hebei will be for us to take. After the Hebei is secured, no general in the realm will be able to stand against you.
The Jin is defending Shouchun because they are afraid you would attack them. They will be content with saving themselves when they hear that we are leaving. Why would they pursue us and put themselves at risk? General, you should send the baggages and supplies to the north first, then lead the main army towards Shouchun. Once our supplies are far away enough, the main army can slowly withdraw. Why worry about having no place to advance or retreat?"

Shi Le was pleased with Zhang Bin's plans, so much so that he had Diao Ying demoted for suggesting he surrender and replaced him with Zhang Bin. In accordance to the plan, he sent out Shi Hu with 20,000 cavalry towards Shouchun. Shi Hu encountered and attacked Jin forces building boats, hoping to capture them, but was defeated by Ji Zhan. As Shi Hu retreated, Ji Zhan pursued them for several miles until he met Shi Le's main army. Shi Le had his troops in a defensive formation and prepared for an attack, but Ji Zhan decided to withdraw back into Shouchun instead.

=== Return to the north ===
In June or July, Shi Le's forces finally left Gepo for the north. By the time they left, however, many of the areas he passed through had already fortified themselves and harvested their grains. His pillages and raids yielded very little, and as the famine continued among his ranks, many of his soldiers resorted to eating each other. They reached Dongyan, where Shi Le was reluctant to cross the Yellow River, as he had heard that the Jin Administrator of Ji, Xiang Bing (向冰), was camped with a large force at Fangtou (枋頭, in modern Hebi, Henan) and may intercept him.

Zhang Bin pointed out that many of Xiang Bing's boats were still in the waterway and not on land. He thus advised Shi Le to send light infantry to captured these boats and use them for the main army to cross the river. In July or August, Kong Chang and another general, Zhi Xiong, went to Wenshi Crossing (文石津, around present-day Yanjin County, Henan), where they built rafts and secretly cross the river to capture the boats. With the boats in his possession, Shi Le led his army to Ji Crossing to cross the Yellow River. He then greatly defeated Xiang Bing, seizing his funds and supplies.

=== Occupying Xiangguo ===
With his soldiers now rejuvenated, Shi Le marched towards Ye. The city had been abandoned for years due to the war, but while Shi Le was campaigning in the south, Liu Kun had installed his nephew, Liu Yan as the Administrator of Wei and garrisoned him there. With enemy forces approaching, Liu Yan holed himself up in the Three Terraces, although his generals, Lin Shen (臨深), Mou Mu (牟穆) and others surrendered to Shi Le.

Shi Le insisted on attacking the Three Terraces, but Zhang Bin intervened and told him:

"Although Liu Yan is weak, he still has several thousand men and the bulwark of the Three Terraces. If we attack, it will not be easy to capture, but if we withdraw and leave them be, they will surely collapse at their own accord. Right now, your biggest enemies are Wang Pengzu (Wang Jun, the Jin Inspector of You province) and Liu Yueshi (Liu Kun); deal with them first and pay no mind to Liu Yan.
Moreover, the world is in shambles, but though you lead a grand army, you continue to rove while your people are without a common purpose. This is no way to protect yourself and control the four corners of the realm. It would be better to pick and occupy a strategic location, where you can amass a large store of grain and supplies. Then, you should inform Pingyang in the west of your plans for You and Bing provinces; this is the resolve of a true hegemon. Handan and Xiangguo are both key locations. Choose one of them to make your capital."

In the end, Shi Le agreed with Zhang Bin's plans and proceeded to occupy Xiangguo.

== Aftermath ==
After occupying Xiangguo, Zhang Bin warned Shi Le to anticipate an attack from either Liu Kun or Wang Jun, and that he should build up his city's defenses and store up his grains. Following his advice, Shi Le sent several detachments to invade Ji province, where many of the local forts and ramparts surrendered, allowing him to transport their grains into Xiangguo. He also sent a petition explaining his intentions for guarding Xiangguo to Liu Cong, who appointed him Chief Controller of Ji, You, Bing and Ying provinces along with Governor of Ji province.

The campaign was Shi Le's last real attempt at conquering the southlands. With its failure, Sima Rui did not face any further large-scale invasions from the north, allowing him to establish the Eastern Jin dynasty at Jiankang in 318, while Shi Le concentrated his effort to unifying northern China. As Zhang Bin predicted, Shi Le soon had to deal with an attack from Wang Jun at the end of 312. He was able to fend off the attack at Xiangguo, and in 313, he went on to easily capture Ye from Liu Yan.

== Sources ==
- Killigrew, John W. (2013). "The Role of the Moushi 谋士 in the Jin Shu and Wei Shu During the Northern Kingdoms Period, 309–450 AD". Journal of Asian History. 47 (2): 151–196. doi:10.13173/jasiahist.47.2.0151. ISSN 0021-910X. JSTOR 10.13173/jasiahist.47.2.0151.
- Book of Jin, vol.104
- Zizhi Tongjian, vol.88
