= Chizhi Shizhu Hou =

Puppet chanyu of the Southern Xiongnu from 188 to 195

Yufuluo

Chizhi Shizhu Hou Chanyu
- Reign: 188–195
- Predecessor: Qiangqu
- Successor: Huchuquan
- Died: 195
- Issue: Liu Bao
- Father: Qiangqu

Yufuluo
- Traditional Chinese: 於夫羅
- Simplified Chinese: 于夫罗
Transcriptions
Standard Mandarin
- Hanyu Pinyin: Yúfúluó

Chizhi Shizhu Hou (Chinese: 持至尸逐侯; d. 195), personal name Yufuluo (於夫羅), was a puppet chanyu of the Southern Xiongnu during the late Han dynasty. In 188, he was appointed chanyu by the Han court following the murder of his father Qiangqu and would later gain the Xiongnu title of Chizhi Shizhu Hou.

== Biography ==
In 184, Qiangqu sent Yufuluo to assist the Han in fighting the Yellow Turban Rebellion. He was later sent to fight against Zhang Chun and the Wuhuan after they rebelled in You province in 187. Resentment towards the Chanyu was growing among the Southern Xiongnu for his relentless conscription of their tribes to do the Han's bidding. At the time, the Xiuchuge people had also rebelled, invading Xihe Commandery from the Hetao region and killing the Inspector of Bing province. In 188, dissidents led by Xiluo clan of the Right Division allied with the Xiuchuge rebels and killed Qiangqu.

The Han court attempted to appoint the Western Tuqi Prince Yufuluo as chanyu, instead of using the traditional Xiongnu election system. The Southern Xiongnu dissented and elected the Marquis of Xubu as a lawful alternate leader. They expelled Yufuluo, who fled to the Han imperial court. When the Marquis of Xubu died the next year an elderly king became the nominal head of state without the title of chanyu and the Southern Xiongnu ceased to exist as a coherent entity.

Yufuluo fled to the Han court but found no support after the death of Emperor Ling of Han in 189. As the Southern Xiongnu rebels prevented him from returning home, he and his followers relocated to Pingyang County in Hedong Commandery, east of the Fen River. He became a wandering mercenary, working under the Yellow Turbans, Yuan Shao, and the Heishan bandits of Zhang Yan. In 193, he supported Yuan Shu at the Battle of Fengqiu against Cao Cao, but was defeated. It was around this time that he may have surrendered to Cao Cao. He died in 195 and his remaining followers joined his brother Huchuquan.

Yufuluo's son was Liu Bao, who in 216, was appointed by the Han chancellor Cao Cao to supervise the Southern Xiongnu in Shanxi. Yufuluo's grandson Liu Yuan went on to found the state of Han-Zhao in 304, one of the first states of the Sixteen Kingdoms. However, some modern Chinese scholars cast doubt on Liu Bao and Liu Yuan's lineage to Yufuluo, believing that the Lius were instead from the Chuge or Xiuchuge people that killed Qiangqu and sent Yufuluo into exile. Their theory suggests that Liu Yuan may had fabricated his lineage to Yufuluo to increase their legitimacy as descendants of the Southern Xiongnu chanyus and the Han dynasty (due to the marriage of Modu Chanyu to a Han princess).

== Family ==
Chizhi Shizhu Hou had a son, Liu Bao. He also had a brother called Huchuquan.

== See also ==
- Lists of people of the Three Kingdoms

== Footnotes ==
Preceded by Qiangqu	Chanyu of the southern Xiongnu; 188–195 AD	Succeeded by Marquis of Xubu (188–189); Huchuquan (195–216)
