= Battle of Yijing =

Conflict between Gongsun Zan and Yuan Shao (198-199)

- Part of the wars at the end of the Han dynasty
Date	198 – March 199
Location	Xiong County, Hebei, China
Result	Yuan Shao victory
Territorial changes	Yuan Shao gains dominance over northern China

Belligerents
Yuan Shao; Liu Yu's remnants Wuhuan; Xiongnu; Xianbei	Gongsun Zan; Heishan bandits

Commanders and leaders
Yuan Shao; Tadun; Qian Zhao	Gongsun Zan †; Zhang Yan; Gongsun Xu; Tian Kai †; Guan Jing †; Tian Yu

Strength
100,000 (Xianyu Fu's and Wuhuan forces); 7,000 Xianbei cavalry	100,000+ (Zhang Yan's forces)

Battle of Yijing
- Traditional Chinese: 易京之戰
- Simplified Chinese: 易京之战
Transcriptions
Standard Mandarin
- Hanyu Pinyin: Yìjīng Zhī Zhàn

The Battle of Yijing was a military conflict which took place in northern China from 198 to 199 in the late Eastern Han dynasty. It was fought between Gongsun Zan, a warlord known as the "White Horse General", and Yuan Shao, a scion of the esteemed Yuan clan and former leader of the coalition against Dong Zhuo. The battle concluded with victory for Yuan Shao, and Gongsun Zan committed suicide.

== Background ==
Despite initial successes in his rivalry with Yuan Shao for dominion over northern China, Gongsun Zan suffered numerous setbacks and gradually lost ground to Yuan Shao. In 195, Gongsun Zan was defeated by Yuan Shao’s general Qu Yi accompanied by Xianyu Fu (a former supporter of Liu Yu) at Baoqiu, losing at least 20000 troops, and promptly retreated to Yijing (易京; northwest of present-day Xiong County, Hebei) to fortify his position.

Supposedly, Gongsun Zan chose Yijing for his fortress on account of a popular rhyme acclaiming it as a vital defensive site. There, Gongsun Zan had ten encircling moats built, each with their own smaller fortification, surrounding a citadel in which he stored a large grain reserve. The fortress at Yijing was also engineered with a system of pulleys to communicate with his officers in other fortifications of the complex without having to leave the company of his wives and concubines within the steel-gated citadel. The besieging force under Qu Yi met a stalemate lasting more than a year until they ran out of supplies and a few thousand troops deserted, prompting Gongsun Zan to counterattack and rout Qu Yi’s troops. Yuan Shao at some point wrote a letter to Gongsun Zan proposing peace, but Zan never responded and continued his fortification progress, telling his chief clerk Guan Jing that Yuan Shao would not withstand a siege against him longer than a year.

Gongsun Zan then pursued an isolationist policy, stubbornly refusing to leave the safety of his fortress and confident that his defences and grain reserves would outlast any assault attempt. He refused requests from his officers in outlying fortifications under siege by Yuan Shao’s forces to take refuge in his citadel, believing that doing so would weaken his forces' resolve to stand and fight. However, this backfired when Yuan Shao’s forces struck at the southern border camps: the defenders, realising the futility of resisting and knowing they would receive no reinforcements, mutinied against their officers and murdered them. As a result of these mutinies, many of these frontier garrisons surrendered, deserted or were destroyed in the wake of Yuan Shao’s advance, allowing Yuan Shao to reach Yijing with relative ease. In time Yuan Shao's army, bolstered by Wuhuan reinforcements under Tadun, reached the gates of Yijing, but the fortress withstood several attacks. Finally, in the third or fourth year of the Jian’an era (198-199), Yuan Shao launched a large campaign against Yijing itself.

== Battle ==
Gongsun Zan sent his son Gongsun Xu to request help from the Heishan bandits in the Taihang Mountains, led by Zhang Yan. Gongsun Zan's idea was to break through the siege with his cavalry and link up with the Heishan bandits, then attack Ji Province and cut off Yuan Shao's line of retreat, forcing him to abandon the siege. However, Guan Jing advised against the plan, saying that the defenders were only willing to fight to protect their families in Yijing and could not be relied on to defend Yijing if Gongsun Zan left. Gongsun Zan then took Guan Jing's suggestion to withstand the siege until a time when Yuan Shao would be forced to retreat.

Yuan Shao's troops attempted to assault the walls of Yijing's towers with ladders, but failed initially to make progress, prompting Zan to describe this period of siege as "tedium" in a letter. Meanwhile, in the third month of the fourth year of Jian'an, Zhang Yan departed with Gongsun Xu and 100,000 troops to march by three routes to the relief of Yijing. Expecting the arrival of Gongsun Xu with the Heishan bandit reinforcements, Zan sent a letter to his son instructing him to lay an ambush of 5,000 elite cavalry on low marshland ground north of Yijing, and then light a fire signal coordinate a simultaneous charge out of Yijing with his troops to surround Yuan Shao's troops. However, Yuan Shao's troops caught the messenger, and Chen Lin sent a forged response letter to Zan to delay the sally while Yuan Shao's troops laid an ambush. Yuan Shao's forces then signalled Gongsun Zan with their own fire and lured him into the ambush, where they routed his troops and forced him to return to Yijing.

Yuan Shao's troops followed up their success by digging tunnels under Yijing and then supporting them with wooden beams once they had reached below the towers. When the sappers judged that they had reached the centre of Yijing, they set the supports alight, collapsing both the citadel and its towers, with some towers falling onto the citadel and damaging it further. Realising his doom, Gongsun Zan killed his wives, children and sisters and committed suicide by self-immolation. Yuan Shao's men storming the citadel climbed its terraces and cut off Gongsun Zan's head, which Yuan Shao had sent to Xuchang to report his victory to the imperial court.

Gongsun Zan's general Tian Kai also fell in the battle to Yuan Shao's troops storming the citadel. Feeling that his advice had doomed his lord, Guan Jing charged his horse into Yuan Shao's army to his death, with the intention to follow his lord. By the time Gongsun Xu and Zhang Yan returned to Yijing with 100,000 troops, it was too late as Gongsun Zan had already lost the battle and committed suicide.

== Aftermath ==
Some time after the battle, Gongsun Xu was killed by the Xiuchuge (who became known as the Chuge around this time), other allies of the Heishan bandits. Tian Yu, until then serving Gongsun Zan, was hired by Xianyu Fu as his adjutant, and subsequently advised him to pledge allegiance to Cao Cao, prioritising the formal imperial court's authority over closer bonds with Yuan Shao. In addition to bestowing rank on Xianyu Fu, Cao Cao also subsequently hired Tian Yu as well in various official positions. On the conclusion of the campaign, Yuan Shao took the occasion to grant seals and ribbons as recognition tokens to the Wuhuan chieftains, both their suzerain Tadun and his vassals Nanlou, Supuyan and Wuyan. With Gongsun Zan's administration wiped out and the Heishan bandits scattered in various areas, Yuan Shao took control over Ji Province and consolidated his dominion over northern China.

The victory over Gongsun Zan freed Yuan Shao to turn attention south, allowing him to at last join the campaign waged against his half-brother Yuan Shu, which had been commenced by other regional warlords since Yuan Shu declared himself emperor two years before. There would be no further effective resistance to his control of northern China until the Guandu campaign fought against Cao Cao in late 200.

== Bibliography ==
- Chen, Shou. Records of the Three Kingdoms (Sanguozhi).
- de Crespigny, Rafe (1984). Northern frontier: the policies and strategy of the later Han Empire. Faculty of Asian Studies monographs. Canberra: Faculty of Asian Studies, The Australian National University. ISBN 978-0-86784-410-8.
- Fan, Ye. Book of the Later Han (Houhanshu).
- Pei, Songzhi. Annotated Records of the Three Kingdoms (Sanguozhi zhu).
  - Wang, Can. Records of Heroes (Yingxiong Ji).
  - Xi, Zuochi. Chronicles of Han and Jin (Han Jin Chunqiu).
  - Yu, Huan. Dianlüe.
  - Yuan, Wei. Chronicles of Emperor Xian (Xiandi Chunqiu).
- Sima, Guang. Zizhi Tongjian.
  - de Crespigny, Rafe (1996). To Establish Peace: being the Chronicle of the Later Han dynasty for the years 189 to 220 AD as recorded in Chapters 59 to 69 of Sima Guang's Zizhi Tongjian. Vol. 1. Canberra: Faculty of Asian Studies, The Australian National University. ISBN 0-7315-2526-4.
