= Liu Xuan =

Liu Xuan is the name of:

- Gengshi Emperor (died 25 AD), personal name Liu Xuan, emperor of the Han dynasty
- Liu Xuan (Three Kingdoms) (224–264), crown prince of Shu during the Three Kingdoms period
- Liu Xuan (Han-Zhao) (died 308 AD), politician of Han-Zhao during the Sixteen Kingdoms period
- Liu Xuan (gymnast) (born 1979), Chinese gymnast, singer and actress
- Xuan Liu (poker player) (born 1985), Canadian poker player
