= Battle of Fengqiu =

Battle between warlords Cao Cao and Yuan Shu (193)

- Part of the wars at the end of the Han dynasty
Date	Spring of 193
Location	Fengqiu (封丘; present-day Fengqiu County, Xinxiang, Henan, China)
Result	Cao Cao victory

Belligerents
Cao Cao; Yuan Shao	Yuan Shu; Heishan Bandits; Xiongnu

Commanders and leaders
Cao Cao; Yuan Shao; Cao Ren	Yuan Shu; Yufuluo

Strength
Unknown	Unknown

The Battle of Fengqiu (Chinese: 封丘之戰) was fought between Cao Cao and Yuan Shu in the spring of 193 in the late Eastern Han dynasty. Cao Cao emerged victorious against Yuan Shu's forces.

== Battle ==
Cao Cao's army was stationed in Juancheng (鄄城). Liu Biao, the Governor (牧) of Jing Province, cut off Yuan Shu's supply route. As a result, Yuan Shu led his army into Chenliu (陳留), garrisoning at Fengqiu (封丘), where the remnants of the Heishan Bandits and the Xiongnu chieftain Yufuluo provided him support. Yuan Shu sent his general Liu Xiang (劉詳) to garrison at Kuangting (匡亭).

When Cao Cao attacked Liu Xiang, Yuan Shu reinforced Kuangting, where the latter was badly defeated. Yuan Shu retreated to defend Fengqiu. Cao Cao subsequently moved to surround the town before Yuan Shu could complete the movement, Yuan Shu fled to Xiangyi (襄邑). Cao Cao pursued to Taishou (太壽) and diverted the waters of the Qu River (渠水) from Xiangyi, cutting off the canal supplying water to the city. After, Yuan Shu fled to Ningling (寧陵) and Cao Cao pursued Yuan Shu's retreat towards Jiujiang (九江). In summer, Cao Cao finally withdrew with his army to Dingtao (定陶).
