= Battle of Diancheng =

Battle between Han-Zhao and Western Jin (316)

- Part of Upheaval of the Five Barbarians
Date	December 316 AD
Location	Xiyang County, Shanxi
Result	Han victory

Belligerents
Han-Zhao	Western Jin

Commanders and leaders
Shi Le	Liu Kun; Han Ju; Ji Dan

Strength
Unknown	+20,000

Casualties and losses
Unknown	Unknown

The Battle of Diancheng was fought between the Han-Zhao general, Shi Le and the Western Jin Inspector of Bing province, Liu Kun in December 316. The battle concluded in Han victory and the fall of Bing province, forcing Liu Kun to flee and join the Inspector of You province, Duan Pidi at Jicheng.

== Background ==
Since his appointment as Inspector of Bing province in 307, Liu Kun was one of the few Western Jin vassals in the north dedicated to fighting the growing threat of the Han-Zhao rebel state. However, as the years went by, mounting defeats on the battlefield and the dwindling population of his domain gradually worsened his situation as he became increasingly reliant on his ally, Tuoba Yilu and his state of Dai for their elite Xianbei cavalry.

In April 314, the Han general, Shi Le led a successful campaign to capture the Jin Inspector of You province, Wang Jun and isolated Liu Kun from the rest of his allies. His success also incited many of the tribes in Dai to defect to Shi Le, forcing Tuoba Yilu to carry out a purge that destabilized his state. For the next two years, he and Yilu were unable to carry out a major campaign against Han.

In February or March 316, Yilu was unexpectedly killed in battle by his son, Tuoba Liuxiu, throwing the Dai into turmoil. There was mass panic among their people as they began suspecting and killing one another. At the time, the Dai generals, Wei Xiong (衞雄) and Ji Dan (箕澹), had a substantial number of followers under their command, many of who were Han Chinese or "Wuhuan" migants at odds with the native Tuoba people. Wishing to escape the chaos, Wei Xiong and Ji Dan brought with them 30,000 families and 100,000 livestock to join Liu Kun. They also brought with them his son, Liu Zun, who had been a hostage under Tuoba Yilu. Liu Kun was so elevated by the news that he personally went to Pingcheng to welcome them, and his military strength was once again restored.

== The battle ==
In December 316, Shi Le led his forces to besiege the Jin Administrator of Leping, Han Ju (韓據) at Diancheng (坫城; southwest of present-day Xiyang County, Shanxi). Soon, Han Ju called for reinforcements from Liu Kun, who was eager to use his new troops among the refugees of Dai. Wei Xiong and Ji Dan warned him against his decision, arguing that their followers have yet to open up to his governance and are still exhausted from their time of displacement. They instead proposed that he first win their support by gathering grains and livestock, as well as adopting a more defensive stance to allow their followers to rest.

However, Liu Kun refused to listen to their advice. He proceeded to rally his entire army to campaign against Shi Le, placing Ji Dan in charge of 20,000 soldiers as the vanguard while he himself camped at Guangmu (廣牧; northwest of present-day Shouyang County, Shanxi) to act as reserves.

When Shi Le heard that Ji Dan's forces were approaching, he decided to march out to lead a counterattack against them. A subordinate attempted to dissuade him, fearing that Ji Dan's troops were strong and elite; he suggested a defensive strategy by pulling back to build moats and ramparts in anticipation of their attack. However, Shi Le angrily rebuked him, stating that Ji Dan's men were both exhausted and without disciplined, and that it was already too late to retreat given how close the enemies were. He then had this subordinate beheaded.

Shi Le assigned his general, Kong Chang as the vanguard commander and ordered his armies to make haste, threatening anyone late with execution. He occupied the rugged terrains, placed decoy soldiers on the hills and laid ambushes in two locations ahead. When Ji Dan arrived, he sent his light cavalry to skirmish them before feigning defeat and retreating. Ji Dan's forces pursued the cavalry, but as they did, they began to break formation and fell into the ambushes. Shi Le's troops attacked them from the front and rear, dealing them a great defeat and capturing around 10,000 armoured horses. Ji Dan and Wei Xiong later retreated with a few thousand cavalry back to Dai Commandery, while Han Ju abandoned Diancheng and fled.

== Aftermath ==
The defeat at Diancheng sent shock waves throughout Bing province, and Liu Kun's situation was made worse when a severe famine soon broke out. His forces could no longer defend the region, and not long after, Liu Kun's Chief Clerk, Li Hong (李弘), surrendered the province over to Shi Le. The people of Yangqu and Leping (樂平; in present-day Jinzhong, Shanxi) commanderies were divided up and relocated back to Shi Le's base at Xiangguo. Before he left, Shi Le also appointed new local commanders to govern the region and sent Kong Chang attack Ji Dan, killing him at Sanggan.

In the same month, Emperor Min of Jin also surrendered to Han forces led by Liu Yao at Chang'an. Liu Kun did not know how to proceed as he and his followers were left with nowhere to go. Hearing his situation, the Jin Inspector of You province, Duan Pidi sent a letter offering Liu Kun to join him, and so on 4 January 317, Liu Kun departed from Feihu (飛狐; in present-day Mount Heng, Shanxi) for Pidi's base at Jicheng. The two generals continued to resist Shi Le in the name of Jin, but in June 318, Liu Kun was accused of planning to betray Pidi, and he was put to death by strangulation.

== Sources ==
- Knechtges, David R. (December 2006), "Liu Kun, Lu Chen, and Their Writings in the Transition to the Eastern Jin", Chinese Literature: Essays, Articles, Reviews, vol. 28, JSTOR, pp. 1–66
- Book of Wei
- Book of Jin
- Zizhi Tongjian
- Guang, Sima. Records of Later Tang Dynasty 后唐纪: Zi Zhi Tong Jian资治通鉴; or Comprehensive Mirror in Aid of Governance. DeepLogic.
