= Liu Meng =

Liu Meng may refer to:

- Liu Meng (Xiongnu) (Chinese: 劉猛; pinyin: Liú Měng, died 272), Southern Xiongnu leader and rebel
- Liu Meng (field hockey) (Chinese: 刘孟; pinyin: Liú Mèng, born 1995), Chinese field hockey player
- Liu Meng (table tennis) (Chinese: 柳萌; pinyin: Liǔ Méng, born 1996), Chinese para table tennis player
