= Qubei =

Southern Xiongnu leader during the Eastern Han dynasty

- Chinese: 去卑
Transcriptions
Standard Mandarin
- Hanyu Pinyin: Qùbēi
- Wade–Giles: ch`üpei

Qubei (Chinese: 去卑; pinyin: Qùbēi, fl. 195–216) was a leader of the Southern Xiongnu and supervisor of the Five Divisions who lived during the late Eastern Han dynasty. An uncle to the last chanyu of the Southern Xiongnu, Huchuquan, Qubei was appointed by the Chinese court to supervise the Five Divisions of Xiongnu after his nephew was detained in Ye in 216. He was also the ancestor of two prominent non-Chinese clans; the Helian, who founded the Xia dynasty during the Sixteen Kingdoms period, and the Dugu.

== Life ==
According to the Book of Wei, Qubei was a member of the imperial Luandi clan of the Southern Xiongnu. The History of the Northern Dynasties specifies that he was the brother of the chanyu, Qiangqu, but a much later and dubious account from the New Book of Tang instead claims that he was the son of Wuli, a descendant of a Han dynasty prince-turned-Xiongnu noble, Liu Jinbo. When Huchuquan ascended as chanyu in 195, Qubei was bestowed the title of "Worthy Prince of the Right" (右賢王; known in the Book of Wei as the "Worthy Prince of the Left").

That same year, when Emperor Xian of Han made his escape from Chang'an to Luoyang, his minister, Dong Cheng called upon Qubei and the White Wave Bandits to assist him in repelling Li Jue and Guo Si's pursuing forces. Qubei and the others initially routed them, but suffered a heavy defeat when Li Jue returned with more troops. Regardless, the emperor was able to escape safely to Anyi (in present-day Xia County, Shanxi).

In 196, Emperor Xian reached Luoyang and was placed under the care of the warlord, Cao Cao. Qubei accompanied Cao Cao in moving the capital to Xuchang before returning home. In 216, Cao Cao detained Huchuquan in Ye and reorganized the last vestiges of the Southern Xiongnu into the Five Divisions around Taiyuan Commandery in modern-day Shanxi. He then appointed Qubei to supervise the Southern Xiongnu in Huchuquan's stead while the chanyu title remained with Huchuquan up to his death, after which no new chanyu was appointed. During his time supervising the Five Divisions, Qubei fought with the Tuoba-Xianbei tribe, who were growing in power to the north of Shanxi. He sent his brother, Panliuxi to attack the Tuoba, but he was defeated and captured in battle.

Qubei had two sons: Liu Meng and Liu Gaoshengyuan. According to a memorial sent by the general, Deng Ai in the 250s, after Qubei's death, his sons were initially not allowed to inherit his domain. Liu Meng was eventually given a title, but later rebelled against the Jin dynasty and was killed in 272. Meng's son, Liu Fulun fled to the Tuoba, where he and his descendants intermarried with the ruling clan and became known as the Dugu tribe. Meanwhile, Liu Gaoshengyuan took over Liu Meng's people, and Gaoshengyuan's son, Liu Hu, became the founder of the Tiefu tribe. In 407, Liu Hu's descendant, Helian Bobo, established one of the Sixteen Kingdoms, the Hu Xia dynasty.
