= Chuge =

Ethnic group in China (circa 2nd–5th century AD)

The Chuge (Chinese: 屠各; pinyin: Chúgè; Wade–Giles: Ch'u-ko), also known as Xiuchuge (Chinese: 休屠各; pinyin: Xiūchúgè; Wade–Giles: Hsiu-ch'u-ko) were an ethnic group that lived in areas of Shanxi and Shaanxi in ancient China. They are described in traditional history as one of the nineteen tribes of the Southern Xiongnu who surrendered to the Han dynasty in the 1st century AD. However, modern studies found that they were likely a separate ethnic group, who instead originated from another contemporary people known as the Xiutu (Chinese: 休屠; pinyin: Xiūtú; Wade–Giles: Hsiu-t'u) in Gansu. Both the Xiutu and Chuge had close ties with the Xiongnu, with a branch of the Chuge later fusing with the Southern Xiongnu and playing a key part in establishing the Han-Zhao dynasty during the Sixteen Kingdoms period.

== Origins and theories ==
According to the 7th-century Chinese text, the Book of Jin, the Chuge were one of the nineteen Southern Xiongnu tribes that surrendered to the Han dynasty in the 1st century AD. They were the most powerful and prestigious among the tribes, as their members were elected to become chanyus of the Southern Xiongnu.

Modern Chinese historians believe that the Chuge had submitted to the Han long before the Southern Xiongnu, tracing them back to the tribe of King Xiutu (休屠王) in the 2nd century BC. King Xiutu was a vassal of the Xiongnu Empire who ruled over the area of modern Wuwei, Gansu. After his death in 121 BC, his followers surrendered to the Han general, Huo Qubing and were distributed across five frontier commanderies in northern China.

The tribesmen that remained around the Gansu region were dubbed the Xiutu (休屠) after their former king, though seals bestowed by the Han court reveal that another official variant of their name, "Xiuzhu" (休著) emerged by the Eastern Han period. Those that were relocated inland to the Ordos Plateau and Shanxi gained the suffix of "ge" (各) to their people's name, and so they became known as "Xiuzhuge" (休著各), "Xiuzhutuge" (休著屠各) and "Xiuchuge" (休屠各), before finally being shortened to "Chuge" (屠各).

The extant of the Xiutu and Chuge's ethnic relation to the Xiongnu people is unclear. Chinese historical texts and seals suggest that the Chinese court saw the two groups as distinct from the Xiongnu. One theory posits that the Xiutu were Lesser Yuezhi people who submitted to the Xiongnu, as the domain of King Xiutu was once under the influence of the Yuezhi. Later on, a branch of the Chuge merged with the Southern Xiongnu in Bing Province.

== History ==
=== Han dynasty ===
Illustration of a seal with the imprint "Wei Chuge shuaishan baizhang" (魏屠各率善佰长). The imprint comes from a Cao Wei era (220–266) seal that was bestowed to a Chuge vassal chieftain.

After his tribe's surrender, King Xiutu's son, Midi became a prominent minister of the Han dynasty under Emperor Wu and Emperor Zhao. He was given the Chinese surname "Jin" (金), meaning "gold" due to his worship of golden statues. Later on, Jin became a notable surname among the Xiutu people, with few even claiming direct descent from Jin Midi. In 49 AD, the Han Administrator of Wuwei, Ren Yan, recruited the Xiutu and other non-Han people as cavalrymen to guard several strategic locations in the region.

The Xiuchuge were first mentioned in official Chinese records in 156 (referred to as "Xiutu" in Xie Cheng's Book of the Later Han). That year, they rebelled with the Wuhuan of Shuofang Commandery against the Han dynasty. They were defeated by the general, Zhang Huan, who sent agents to assassinate the Xiuchuge leaders. The Xiuchuge were later employed as military auxiliaries for Xia Yu in repelling the marauding Xianbei at Beidi Commandery in 174–175.

In 188, the Xiuchuge rebelled again, invading Xihe Commandery in Bing and killing the local administrator, Xing Ji. A few months later, the Xiuchuge defeated and killed the Inspector of Bing, Zhang Yi. At the time, many of the Southern Xiongnu tribes were disgruntled with the chanyu as they were insistently being sent to fight against rebellions for the Han. Seeing the success of the Xiuchuge, the Xiluo clan of the Southern Xiongnu Right Division allied with the Xiuchuge and killed the chanyu, Qiangqu. Though the Han court appointed Qiangqu's son, Yufuluo as the new chanyu, the Xiuchuge and their allies rejected him and elected a marquis from the Xubu clan in his place. Yufuluo was exiled to the east of the Fen River, where he and later his brother continued to claim themselves as chanyus. After the marquis died just a year into his reign, the rebel Xiongnu abolished the chanyu position and installed a nominal elderly king.

The former Southern Xiongnu tribes maintained their distance from the ongoing Han civil war, but the Xiuchuge of Bing province were occasionally drawn into the conflict. Around this time, their name was also shortened to Chuge. In 190, the Han minister, Zheng Tai, when advising the warlord Dong Zhuo, referred to the Chuge as one of "the most vigorous fighters all under Heaven". In the Taihang Mountains, four battalions of the Chuge allied with Zhang Yan of the Heishan bandits and fought against the warlord, Yuan Shao. After Yuan Shao defeated his Ji province rival, Gongsun Zan in 199, the latter's son, Gongsun Xu, fled to the Chuge for safety, but the Chuge had him killed instead. According to Chen Lin's proclamation to Yu province, the Chuge submitted to Yuan Shao that same year. They evidently rendered service to the Yuan family, as during their civil war in 203, the Chuge sided with Yuan Shang before they mutinied and defected to his brother, Yuan Tan. The brothers were later defeated by Cao Cao, who went on to unify northern China. In 216, Chen Lin, now an official of Cao Cao, once again mentioned the Chuge in his proclamation to the people of Wu as one of the ethnic minority groups conscripted to fight in Cao Cao's southward campaign that year.

Additionally, in 214, Cao Cao's general, Xiahou Yuan attacked a group of Chuge tribes at Gaoping County (present-day Guyuan, Ningxia) in northwestern China and scattered them.

=== Three Kingdoms ===
During the Three Kingdoms period, the Xiutu were briefly mentioned when one of their chieftains in Liang province, Liang Yuanbi (梁元碧), brought more than 2,000 families to submit to the Cao Wei dynasty. The Wei general, Guo Huai relocated them to Gaoping County in Anding Commandery, where they were managed by the Commandant of Xichuan.

=== Sixteen Kingdoms and Northern dynasties ===
==== Han-Zhao dynasty (304–329) ====
In 216 AD, Cao Cao had the remnants of the Xiongnu in Shanxi reorganized into the Five Divisions, where they continued to serve as military auxiliaries on the northern frontiers. In 304, the Five Divisions under Liu Yuan rebelled against the Western Jin dynasty and founded his state of Han (renamed Zhao in 319, hence the collective name of Han-Zhao), marking the beginning of the tumultuous Sixteen Kingdoms period.

Official records from the period state that Liu Yuan was a direct descendant of the chanyu Luandi clan who traced his lineage all the way back to Modu Chanyu. At the same time, he also presented himself as a restorer of the Han dynasty, citing his Xiongnu ancestors' marriages to Han princesses through Heqin. However, the same records also contain multiple excerpts referring to Liu Yuan and his followers as "Chuge". Modern Chinese historians such as Tang Changru believe that Liu Yuan was actually a member of the Chuge who forged his lineage to the chanyus for imperial legitimacy, while a minority view held by Zhou Weizhou believe Liu Yuan's genealogy was genuine, but that the Chuge had simply become the primary identity and blanket term for the sinicized Xiongnu at the time. Chen Yong, who supports Tang's view, suggests that Liu Yuan's father, Liu Bao, was the head chief of the Bing province Chuge who annexed the Five Divisions during the Jiaping era (249–254) and took over as their ruling elite before being forced into submission by the Cao Wei and Western Jin courts.

The Han drove the Jin court out of northern China in 318, but the state was soon split into two between Liu Yuan's distant cousin, Liu Yao and the Jie warlord, Shi Le. Liu Yao retreated to the Guanzhong Basin in northwestern China and renamed his state to (Former) Zhao, while Shi Le broke away and established his own state of (Later) Zhao. The Former Zhao was destroyed in 329, during which the imperial Liu clan were slaughtered and around 5,000 Chuge people of the Five Divisions were buried alive by the Later Zhao general, Shi Hu.

==== Later history ====
The Chuge and Xiutu continued to appear throughout the Sixteen Kingdoms and the subsequent Northern and Southern dynasties period. A prominent figure from the Xiutu was Wang Zhuo, a military general from Longxi Commandery who served under five different regimes. The epitaph of his great-grandson, Wang Zhenbao (王真保) states that Wang Zhuo's descendants served as officials for the Former Qin, Western Qin and Northern Wei dynasties. Under the Northern Wei, the non-Xianbei tribal groups were treated poorly and discriminated against by the ruling Xianbei class. In response, the Chuge and Xiutu of northwestern China allied with the Di, Qiang and Lushuihu in launching numerous revolts against the Wei, such as in 452 and 506 AD.

The last mentions of the Chuge and Xiutu in official Chinese records were in the 6th century. Long before that, their people were already exhibiting signs of deep sinicization, evidenced by their Chinese surnames such as Liu, Jin, Wang, Bi, Zhang, Li, Guo, Dong, Cheng and Huang. They also intermarried with the various other minority ethnic groups that they cohabited with, an example being the Chuge in northern Shaanxi and northern Shanxi, who intermixed and eventually formed part of the Jihu people. It is presumed that the Chuge and Xiutu eventually disappeared from history as they were assimilated into the rest of Chinese society.
