= Saibei =

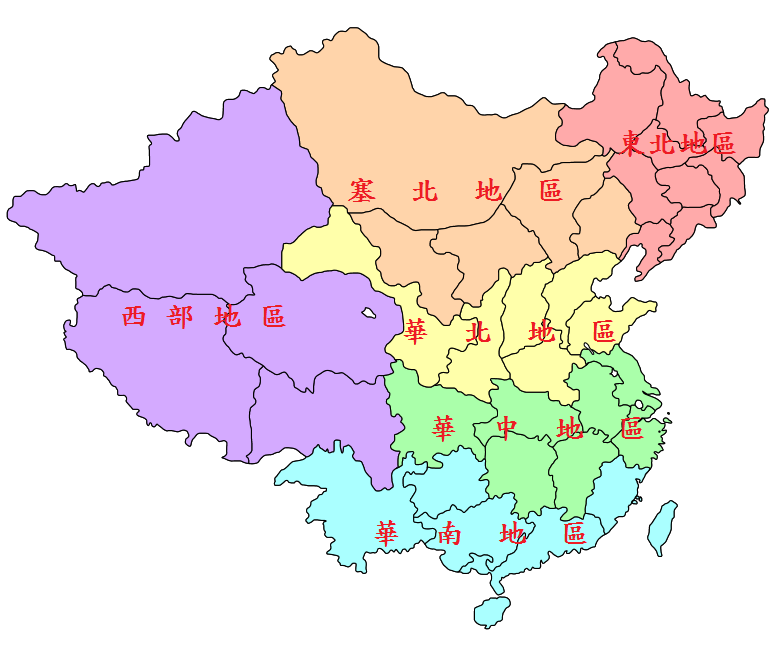
Saibei Four Provinces during the Republic of China's Mainland period

Saibei (Chinese: 塞北; pinyin: Sàiběi; lit. 'region north of the Great Wall of China'), also known as Saiwai (塞外) and Yibei (迤北), is a geographical term used in Chinese history. However, with the independence of Outer Mongolia in modern times, it is rarely used today.

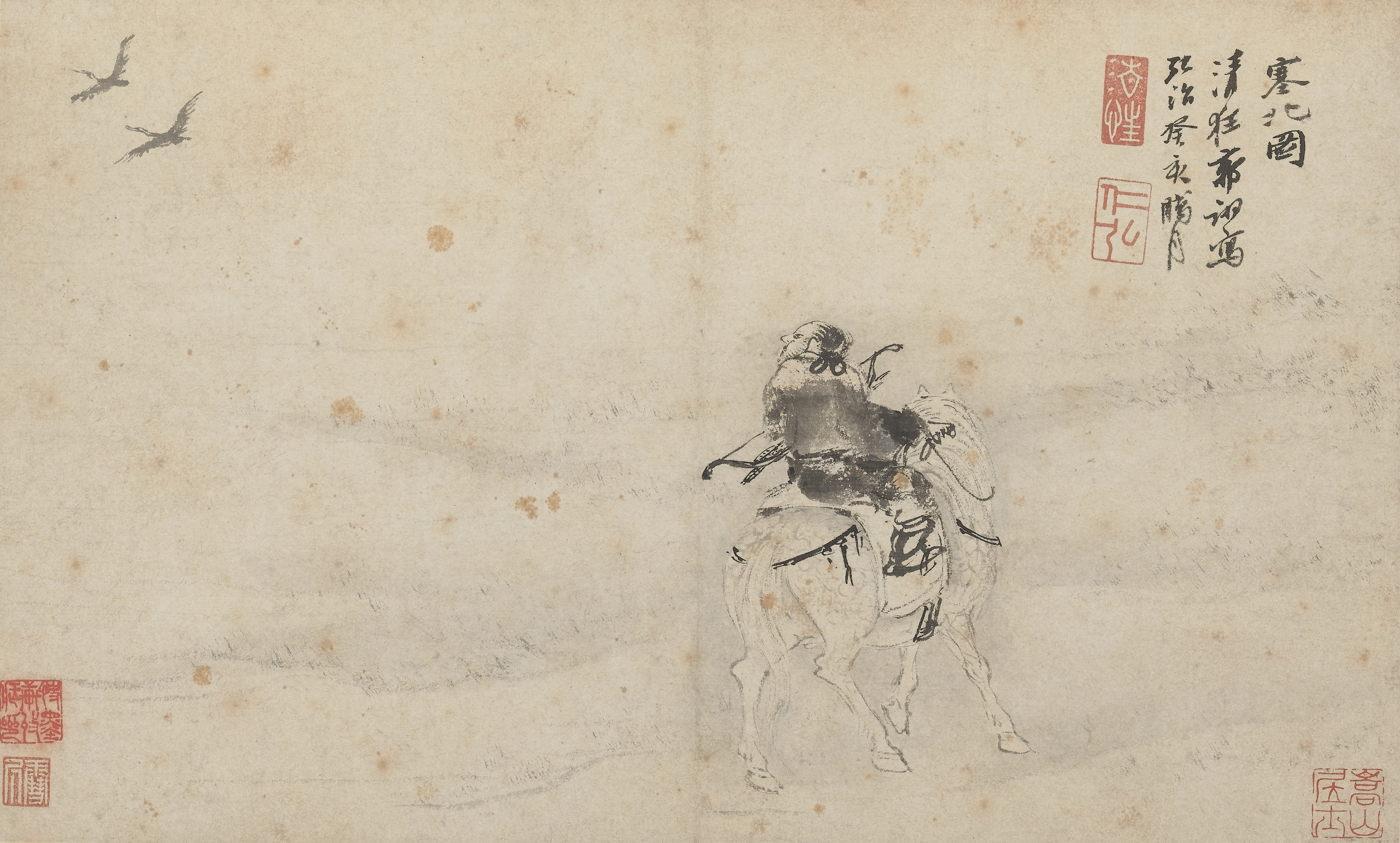
Saibeitu (塞北圖), by Ming painter Guo Xu

Sai (塞) refers to frontier fortresses and fortresses. The term "Sai" is equivalent to the Ming Great Wall today. This boundary marks the northern limit of the frontier fortress, and the area beyond it is known as Saibei. It is sometimes used in conjunction with Saiwai.

However, unlike directional terms such as northeast and southwest, Saibei has a deeper meaning as a border between the Han agricultural civilization and the northern nomadic tribes. After the founding of the People's Republic of China, the administrative division was reset and the other four provinces were abolished (except for "Ningxia", which remained as a provincial name but with a greatly reduced area). Some areas were incorporated into Hebei Province, Liaoning Province, and Ningxia Hui Autonomous Region, all of which are now part of the Inner Mongolia Autonomous Region. Due to these changes, the term Saibei is rarely used in geographical divisions today. After the Republic of China government moved to Taiwan, the concept of Saibei continued to be used in geography textbooks until the 1990s when education reform began and textbooks were updated. In order to reflect the current administrative division, the term has now been abandoned. However, the geographical division in Taiwan differs from that of the People's Republic of China. The government of the People's Republic of China includes Inner Mongolia in the North China region, while Mongolia (formerly Outer Mongolia) is recognized as an independent country in the World Geographic Index.

During the Qing dynasty, Saibei referred to the geographical area inhabited by the Mongols, including South Mongolia, North Mongolia (including Kobdo and Tannu Uriankhai), and West Mongolia (present-day Alxa League). When the Republic of China was established, it encompassed the five provinces of Rehe, Chahar, Suiyuan, Ningxia, and Mongolia. During the period when the Republic of China government recognized the Mongolian People's Republic (present-day Mongolia), Saibei was used as a geographical division to refer to its first four provinces, known as the Saibei Four Provinces (塞北四省).

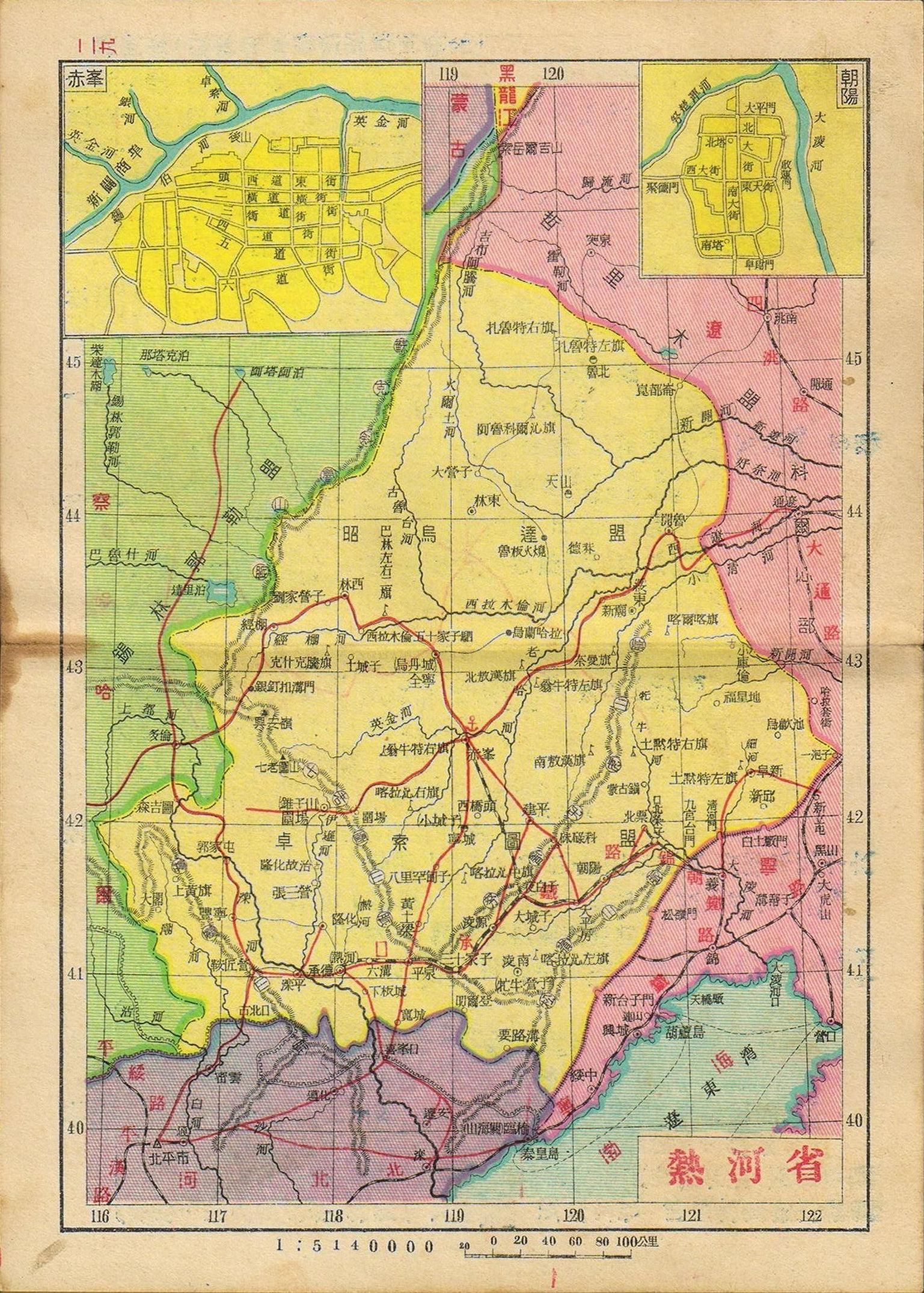
Rehe Province

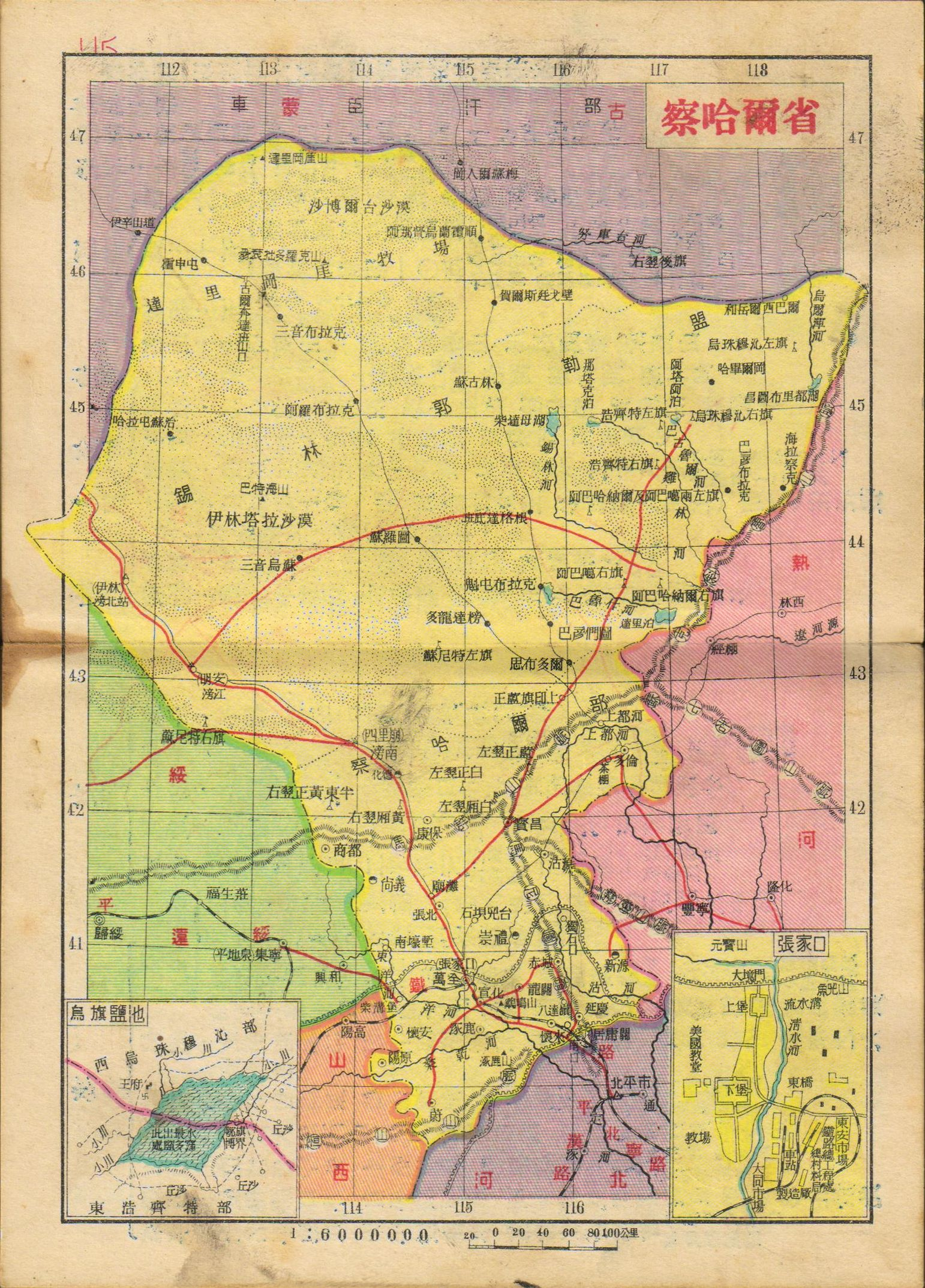
Chahar Province

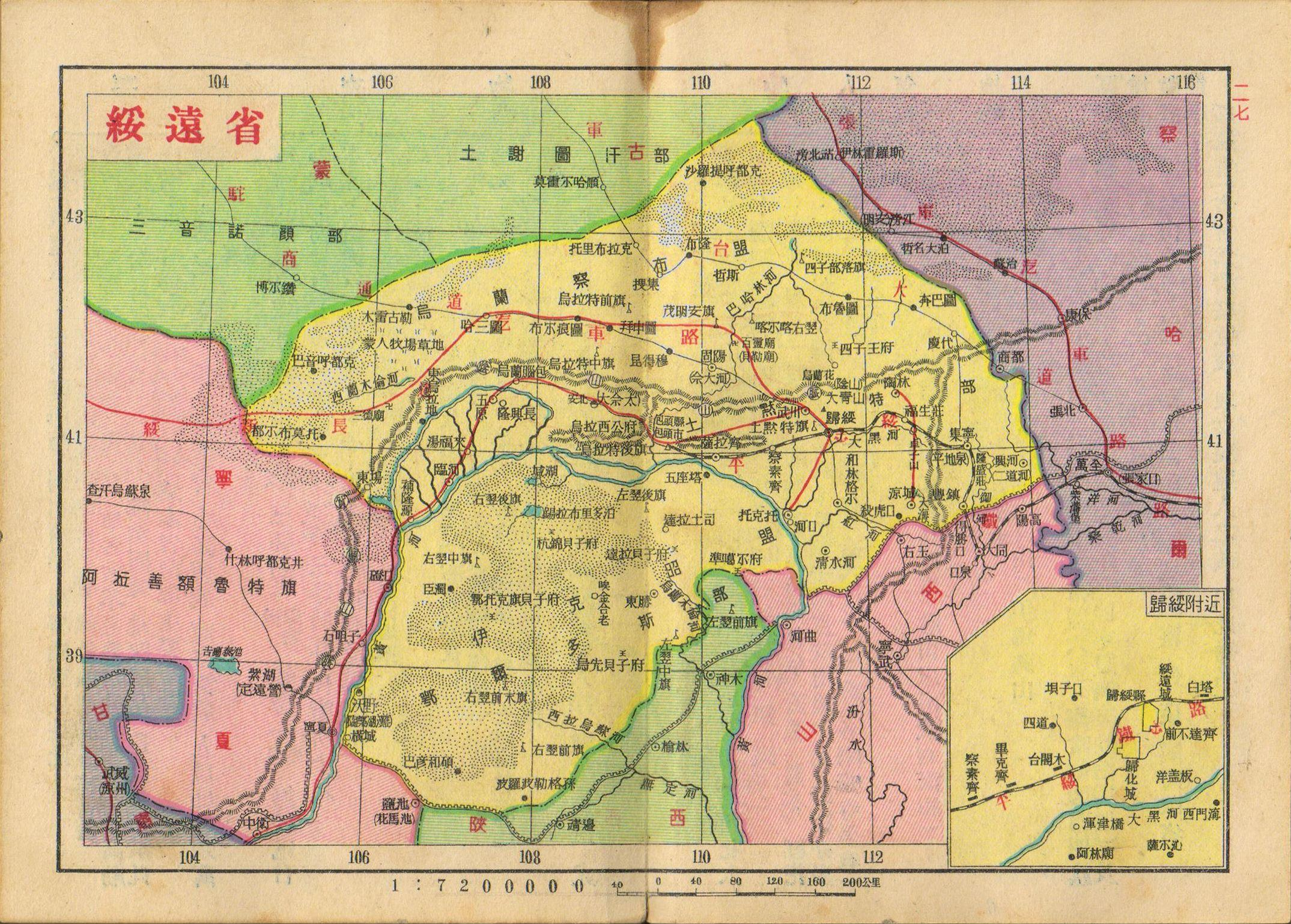
Suiyuan Province

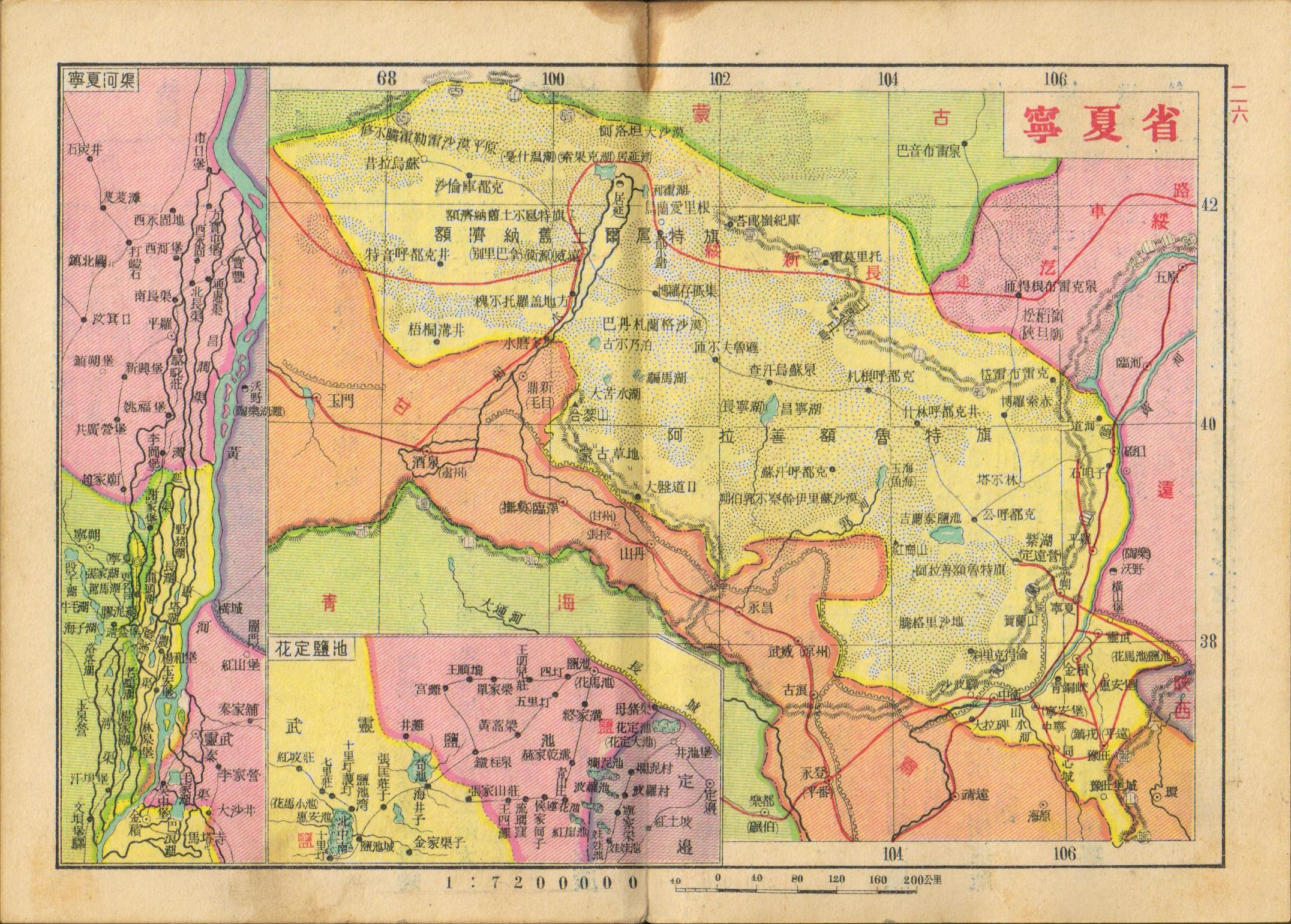
Ningxia Province

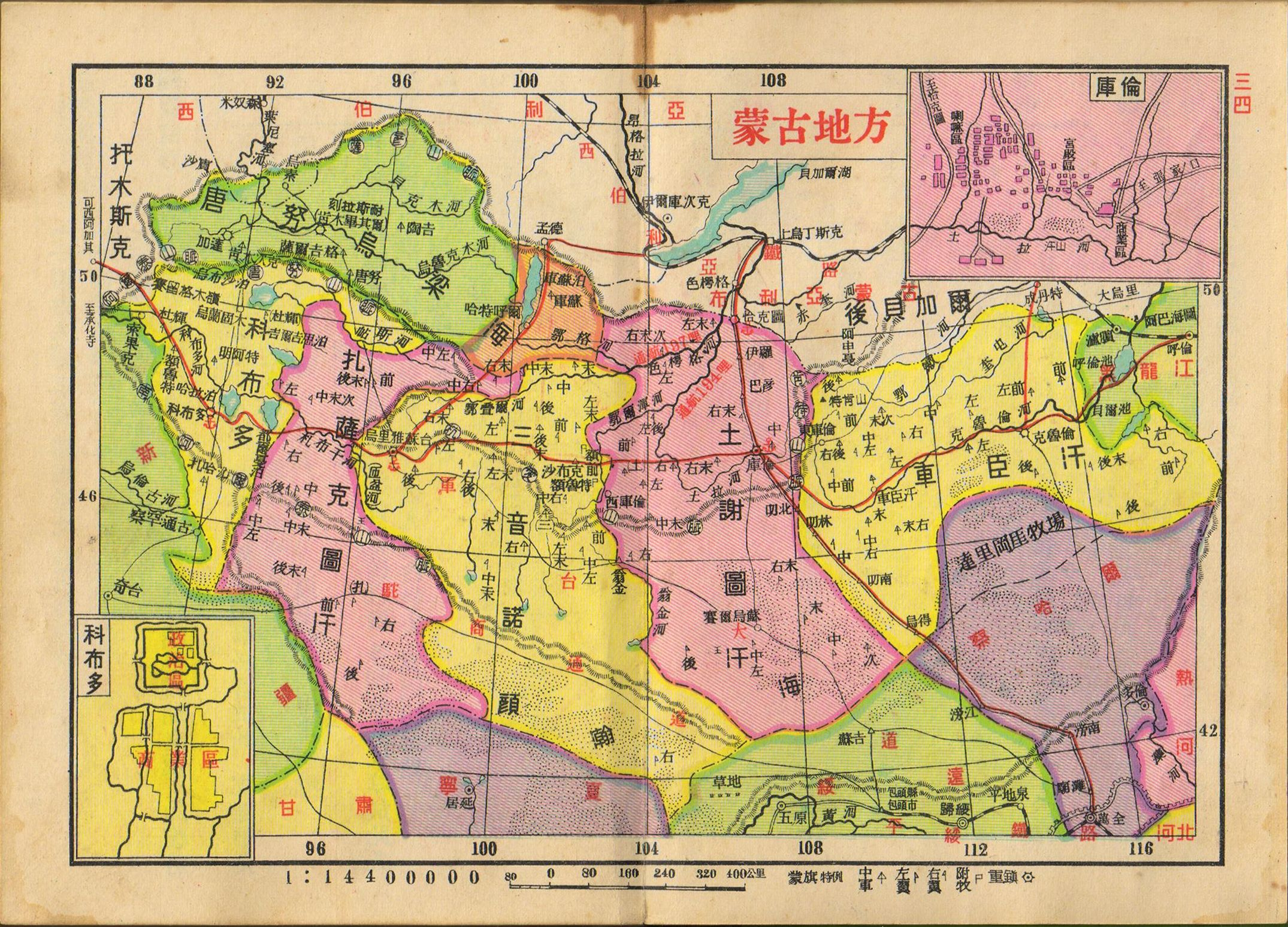
Mongolian region
