= Qiangqu =

Chanyu of the Southern Xiongnu from 179 to 188

- Chanyu
- Reign: c. 179–188 AD
- Predecessor: Huzheng
- Successor: Yufuluo
- Father: from Qiang (Kiyan) maternal tribe

Qiangqu (Chinese: 羌渠; r. 179–188 AD) was the Western Wise Prince, successor to Huzheng, and chanyu of the Southern Xiongnu from 179 to 188 AD.

Qiangqu's reign coincided with a troublesome time for the Han Empire, and few records address Chinese relations with the Southern Xiongnu. In 187 AD Qiangqu sent Southern Xiongnu cavalry troops under command of the Eastern Tuqi Prince (Wise Prince) to aid the governor of Yuzhou province against the former governor, Zhongshan province, Zhang Chun, who had rebelled in alliance with the Wuhuan. This caused discontent among the elders, who were alarmed by the frequency with which Qiangqu sent their men off to battle for the Han dynasty.

In 188 AD, the Xiuchuge people rose in rebellion in the Hetao region of Bing province and killed the provincial inspector after invading Xihe Commandery. The Southern Xiongnu dissidents, led by the Xiluo clan of the Right Division, formed an alliance with the Xiuchuge, and together they killed Qiangqu. The Han court passed the title of chanyu down to his son Yufuluo, although the rebels refused to acknowledge him and installed a marquis of the Xubu clan in his place.

== Footnotes ==
Preceded by Huzheng	Chanyu of the Southern Xiongnu; 179–188 AD	Succeeded by Yufuluo
