= Zhang Yan (Han dynasty) =

Late 2nd century Chinese leader of the Heishan bandits

- 張燕

General of the Household Who Pacifies Disorder (平难中郎将)
- In office 180s/190s–?
- Monarch: Emperor Ling of Han

General Who Pacifies the North (平北將軍) (under Cao Cao)
- In office 204 – ?
- Monarch: Emperor Xian of Han

Personal details
- Born: Chu Yan (褚燕); Unknown Zhengding County, Hebei
- Died: Unknown
- Children: Zhang Fang
- Occupation: Bandit leader, general, official
- Other name: Zhang Feiyan (張飛燕)
- Peerage: Marquis of Anguo Village (安國亭侯)

Zhang Yan (fl. 180s–205), born Chu Yan, also known as Zhang Feiyan, was the leader of the Heishan bandits during the late Eastern Han dynasty of China. He rose from a local rebel to master of a confederation that could hold off the Han, becoming a regional power, and was able to maintain authority in Changshan until he chose to surrender to Cao Cao, getting enfeoffment that remained with his family.

== Life ==
Originally named Chu Yan, he was from Zhending County, Changshan Commandery, (Note: Zhao Yun was from the same county.) which is around present-day Zhengding County, Hebei. Because he was fast, agile, and brave, his men called him "Feiyan", meaning "Flying Swallow". He raised forces during the Yellow Turban revolt and pillaged Shanze then aligned with the bandit forces of Zhang Niujiao (張牛角) with Niujiao as the superior commander. When the group raided Julu Commandery in 185 and attacked Yingtao, Zhang Niujiao was mortally wounded by an arrow. Before he died, Zhang ordered his men to obey Chu Yan as their new leader. Chu Yan thus changed his family name from "Chu" to "Zhang" to honour Zhang Niujiao.

With Zhang Yan's energy and military reputation, his confederation steadily grew in strength, until they were said to be one million strong though historians suggest more in the tens of thousands. They became known as the Heishan bandits, and operated as a bandit confederacy in the Taihang Mountains. Though the use of the term bandits could have multiple meanings, Sinologist Carl Leban uses the term rebels instead while Rafe De Crespigny notes it was likely a peasant-led group (one of many but perhaps the most successful) but he accepts the bandit designation as correct.

Their position gave them access to the capital region of Henei and the provinces of Bing, Ji, and Yan. All the commanderies north of the Yellow River were exposed to their attacks and while Lu Zhi was able to drive Zhang Yan forces away from Henei, the Han could not suppress the rebellion. In order to pacify him, the government eventually appointed Zhang Yan "General of the Household Who Pacifies Disorder" and granted him the right to appoint officials in his territories, bringing the group within the administration, confirming Zhang Yan in authority while saving face for the Han court. Later, Zhang Yan invaded Henei again and approached the capital. The court appointed Zhu Jun as the governor of Henei to repel Zhang Yan.

By the early 190s with the land in civil war, Zhang Yan had formed an alliance with the warlord Gongsun Zan against their common opponent, Yuan Shao. In 193, the Heishan bandits had backed mutineers and local rivals of Yuan Shao to seize his capital of Ye and nearly captured Yuan Shao's family. Yuan Shao responded with force, allying with reinforcements from some of the Wuhuan and Xiuchuge tribes, and even gaining the support of Lü Bu. He marched 250 kilometers (over 150 miles) through the Taihang Mountains, destroying the Heishan bandit camps as he went. The southern hills were overrun, but at Changshan, Zhang Yan had 20-30 thousand soldiers and several thousand cavalry. He fought for over ten days with Yuan Shao, Zhang Yan suffered major casualties and got the worst of the fighting, but Yuan Shao's troops were exhausted and also withdrew. Despite the defeats, Zhang Yan was able to maintain his independence in Changshan but his power as the head of a regional confederation was broken.

In 195, Yuan Shao's Administrator of Dong Zang Hong had fallen out with Yuan Shao and Zang Hong was besieged. In the exchange of diplomatic correspondence, Zang Hong's celebrated letter claimed Zhang Yan, whose nickname he used, was one of the figures who might come to his aid, raiding the north and forcing Yuan Shao to turn back on the pleas of his officers. Acknowledging Yuan Shao and others mocked a gentleman such as himself relying on such a group, Zang Hong pointed to Yuan Shao's group using Yellow Turbans themselves (possibly referring to Yuan Shao's junior ally Cao Cao deal with the Qingzhou Turbans). He also turned to the Han Emperors of the past having such peasant allies, arguing Zhang Yan had taken imperial orders in the past. There is no word on Zhang Yan attacking Yuan Shao before Zang Hong fell. In 199, Zhang Yan responded to Gongsun Zan's request, via son Gongsun Xu, for help by marching along three routes in the Battle of Yijing against Yuan Shao, but Gongsun Zan was defeated and killed before Zhang Yan arrived.

In 204, Zhang Yan made contact with the warlord Cao Cao, who at the time was warring against Yuan Shao's sons, Yuan Tan and Yuan Shang and besieging Ye. Cao Cao appointed him General Who Pacifies The North (平北將軍). In the summer of 205, after Cao Cao drove the Yuans to the Wuhuan, Zhang Yan brought his 100,000 followers and surrendered; he was enfeoffed as the Marquis of Anguo Village (安國亭侯). Chen Shou, when compiling the Sanguozhi/Records of the Three Kingdoms after the civil war, praised Zhang Yan (and other warlords) for giving up their rebellion, gaining rank and security for their families, unlike other warlords who had been destroyed. After his death, his son Zhang Fang succeeded him as marquis; his family maintained their fief during the following decades.

== Descendants ==
Zhang Fang was known to have a son, Zhang Rong (张融). Zhang Yan had at least one great-grandson, Zhang Lin (张林; died c.February 301), who was in league with Sima Lun as the latter became regent of Emperor Hui of Jin and later usurped the throne. However, Zhang Lin was killed by Sima Lun soon after the latter became emperor.

== In popular culture ==
Zhang Yan appears in Total War: Three Kingdoms, leading his own bandit faction. He also appears in the game Wo Long: Fallen Dynasty as the boss of the third sub mission.

== See also ==
- Lists of people of the Three Kingdoms
