= Heishan bandits =

Bandit confederacy based in the Taihang Mountains (185-205)

The Heishan bandits or Black Mountain bandits (Chinese: 黑山賊; pinyin: Hēishān zéi) was a bandit confederacy in the Taihang Mountain range during the later years of the Eastern Han dynasty in China. They played a part in the internecine feuds that followed the Eastern Han dynasty's descent into chaos preceding the Three Kingdoms period, during which they eventually surrendered to the warlord Cao Cao.

== History ==
Following the loss of central government control after the Yellow Turban Rebellion, revolt sprung up across China. One such group under Zhang Niujiao (張牛角, aka Oxhorn Zhang), unrelated to the Yellow Turban movement, rose to power in the hill countries of the Taihang Mountains by plundering the western areas of the North China Plain. In 185, Zhang Niujiao and Chu Yan (褚燕) joined forces to raid the town of Yingtao (癭陶). Zhang Niujiao was killed in the skirmish, and his followers followed his last order to join Chu Yan. Chu Yan changed his surname to Zhang to honour his fallen colleague, so he became known as Zhang Yan. Soon, he became the nominal chief of all the confederecy east of the Taihang range, forming a group known as the Heishan bandits. However the use of the term bandits could have multiple meanings, Sinologist Carl Leban uses the term rebels instead while Rafe De Crespigny notes it was likely a peasant-led group (one of many but perhaps the most successful) but he accepts the bandit designation as correct. Their ranks grew steadily in number until they were said to reach a million though historians suggest in reality numbers were more in the tens of thousands. They conducted raids in the commanderies of Changshan (常山), Zhao (趙), Zhongshan (中山), Shangdang (上黨) and Henei (河內). While Zhu Jun was able to push them away from the capital, the Han were unable to control the situation north of the Yellow River, the government accepted a nominal surrender and offered the bandits official positions. However, when the central government fell under Dong Zhuo's chaotic control in 189, the Heishan bandits went back to their former activities.

In the civil wars that followed the unsuccessful campaign against Dong Zhuo, Zhang Yan and the Heishan bandits seem to have allied with the warlord Gongsun Zan. In 191 the Heishan bandits raided Dong Commandery (東郡), under the control of Yuan Shao's associate Cao Cao, but were driven back. Early in 193, the bandits and a contingent of the Southern Xiongnu under Yufuluo aided Yuan Shu, who was driven out of his original territory of Nanyang (南陽) by Yuan Shao's ally Liu Biao, in Chenliu (陳留). As Chenliu was also within Cao Cao's territories, he swiftly defeated the allies and chased Yuan Shu away to the south. Later, the Heishan bandits under Yu Du (于毒), joined by local rebels, stormed Yuan Shao's Ye city, capital of Wei Commandery (魏郡), and killed its Grand Administrator (太守) Li Cheng (栗成). This last attack drew Yuan Shao's furious retaliation; he led a suppression campaign to crush the bandits, slaying Yu Du and many other Heishan leaders, but Yuan Shao was ultimately unable to defeat Zhang Yan, who had the backing of various Xiongnu and Wuhuan groups. With heavy casualties on both sides, the opposing armies made a swift withdrawal from the area.

Yuan Shao's campaign might have diminished the Heishan bandits' prospects in the south, but Zhang Yan and his people continued to hold out in the northern Changshan Commandery. In 199, Zhang Yan answered Gongsun Zan's call for help as he made his last stand in the Battle of Yijing, but his bandit army did not arrive in time and thus could not save Gongsun Zan from his demise. In 205, as Cao Cao drove out the Yuan family from the region, Zhang Yan led his men to submit to Cao Cao.

== Names of the bandits ==
As the members of the confederacy were outlaws, many of them used nicknames, named after their defining traits. While some of these names may be genuine names, there had been some efforts to translate the names and determine the possible logic behind them.

- Boque (白雀, White Sparrow)
- Bo Rao (白繞, White Circles)
- Fuyun (浮雲, Floating Cloud)
- Guo Daxian (郭大賢, Guo Great-Virtue)
- Huanglong (黃龍, Yellow Dragon)
- Kujiu (苦蝤, Dry Grub) - possibly named for his baldness
- Li Damu (李大目, Big-Eyes Li)
- Liu Shi (劉石)
- Luoshi (羅市)
- Pinghan Daji (平漢大計, Grand Design to Pacify the Han)
- Qing Niujue (青牛角, Green Ox-horn)
- Sili Yuancheng (司隸掾城, Director of Retainers Who Scales the City Wall)
- Sui Gu (眭固, Fixed Gaze)
- Sun Qing (孫輕)
- Tao Sheng (陶升)
- Wang Dang (王當)
- Wulu (五鹿, Five Deer) - possibly named for something he wore
- Yang Feng (楊鳳)
- Yu Digen (于羝根) - possibly named for having a hairy face or penis
- Yu Du (于毒, Poison Yu)
- Zhang Niujiao (張牛角, Oxhorn Zhang)
- Zhang Leigong (張雷公, Zhang Lord of Thunder) - named for his loud voice
- Zhang Yan (nicknamed Flying Swallow Zhang) - named for his agility
- Zuo Zizhangba (左髭丈八, Zuo with the Eighty-foot Mustache)
- Zuoxiao (左校, Enclosure on the Left) - probably took his name from the title of the officer responsible for convict labourers under the Court Architect

== In popular culture ==
The Heishan bandits, led by Zhang Yan, are a playable faction in the turn-based strategy video game Total War: Three Kingdoms.

== See also ==
- Ji province
