= Huchuquan =

Chanyu of the Southern Xiongnu from 195 to 216

Chanyu
- Reign: 195–?
- Predecessor: Chizhi Shizhu Hou
- Born: Unknown
- Died: Unknown
- Father: Qiangqu

Huchuquan
- Traditional Chinese: 呼廚泉
- Simplified Chinese: 呼厨泉
Transcriptions
Standard Mandarin
- Hanyu Pinyin: Hūchúquán

Huchuquan was the last chanyu (r. 195–216) of the Southern Xiongnu during the late Eastern Han dynasty and Three Kingdoms period of China. He was a younger brother of the chanyu in exile, Yufuluo.

== History ==
After Yufuluo died in 195, Huchuquan succeeded his as chanyu but remained in exile around Hedong Commandery due to the Southern Xiongnu rebels that had ousted his family from their domain. Previously, Yufuluo had come into conflict with the warlord, Cao Cao but appears to have surrendered just before to his death. Shortly after his ascension, his uncle, Qubei led their forces to aid Emperor Xian of Han in escaping from Chang'an to Luoyang, where he was welcomed by Cao Cao. Qubei later helped escort the emperor to Cao Cao's base at Xuchang.

In 202, Huchuquan rebelled and allied himself with Yuan Shang, but was defeated by Cao Cao's officer Zhong Yao, prompting him to surrender. In 206, the Bing province warlord, Gao Gan, on the verge of defeat to Cao Cao, personally sought out Huchuquan for help, but he refused. Gao Gan was later killed while fleeing towards Jing province.

In 216, Huchuquan entered the imperial court to pay homage to Emperor Xian. He was given an official rank and detained at Ye as an honoured prisoner. Meanwhile, Cao Cao had the last vestiges of the Southern Xiongnu rearranged into the Five Divisions and settled around Taiyuan Commandery. The Five Divisions were supervised by Qubei, while Huchuquan held the nominal title of chanyu from Ye until his death, after which no new chanyu was proclaimed.

== See also ==
- Lists of people of the Three Kingdoms
