= Xihe Commandery =

Historical political subdivision in China

Xihe Commandery (Chinese: 西河郡) was a historical commandery of China, located in modern northern Shanxi and part of Inner Mongolia. The name "Xihe" referred to a southward section in the middle reaches of the Yellow River.

The commandery was separated from Shang Commandery in 125 BC. In 2 AD, there were 36 counties in the commandery, including Fuchang (富昌), Zouyu (騶虞), Huze (鵠澤), Pingding (平定), Meiji (美稷), Zhongyang (中陽), Lejie (樂街), Tujing (徒經), Gaolang (臯狼), Dacheng (大成), Guangtian (廣田), Huanyin (圜陰), Yilan (益闌), Pingzhou (平周), Hongmen (鴻門), Lin (藺), Xuanwu (宣武), Qianzhang (千章), Zengshan (增山), Huanyang (圜陽), Guangyan (廣衍), Wuche (武車), Humeng (虎猛), Lishi (離石), Guluo (穀羅), Rao (饒), Fangli (方利), Xicheng (隰成), Linshui (臨水), Tujun (土軍), Xidu (西都), Pinglu (平陸), Yinshan (陰山), Nishi (觬氏), Boling (博陵) and Yanguan (鹽官). The population in 2 AD was 698,836, in 136,396 households. By 140 AD, only 13 counties (Lishi, Pingding, Meiji, Lejie, Zhongyang, Gaolang, Pingzhou, Pinglu, Yilan, Huanyin, Lin, Huanyang, Guangyan) remained, and the population had decreased to 20,838, in 5,698 households. The region saw repeated nomadic raids toward the end of Han dynasty, and after the establishment of Cao Wei, the northern part of the commandery was abandoned.

Xihe became a principality in Western Jin dynasty. In 280 AD, Xihe had 4 counties, Lishi, Xicheng (隰城), Zhongyang and Jiexiu (介休), with a population of 6,300 households. The region was lost in the Disaster of Yongjia. Under Northern Wei, the commandery was reestablished in 484 AD, and included 3 counties (Xicheng, Jiexiu, Yong'an 永安) and a population of 5,388 households. It was eventually abolished in early Sui dynasty.

During the Sui and Tang dynasties, Xihe Commandery became an alternative name for Fen Prefecture (汾州). In 741 AD, it administered 5 counties, namely Xihe (formerly Xicheng), Xiaoyi (formerly Yong'an), Jiexiu, Pingyao and Lingshi. The total population was 320,230, or 59,450 households.
