= Bingzhou =

Historical region of China

- Chinese: 并州
Transcriptions
Standard Mandarin
- Hanyu Pinyin: Bīngzhōu

Bingzhou, or Bing Province, was a location in ancient China. According to legend, when Yu the Great (c. 2200 BC–2100 BC) tamed the flood, he divided the land of China into the Nine Provinces. Historical texts such as the Rites of Zhou, and "Treatise on Geography" section (volume 28) of the Book of Han, recorded that Bingzhou was one of the Nine Provinces. Bingzhou covered roughly the areas around present-day Baoding, Hebei, and Taiyuan and Datong in Shanxi.

== History ==
=== Han dynasty and earlier ===
Since the fifth century BC Bingzhou had been separated from the Ordos Desert repeatedly by a series of walls that would form the Great Wall of China.

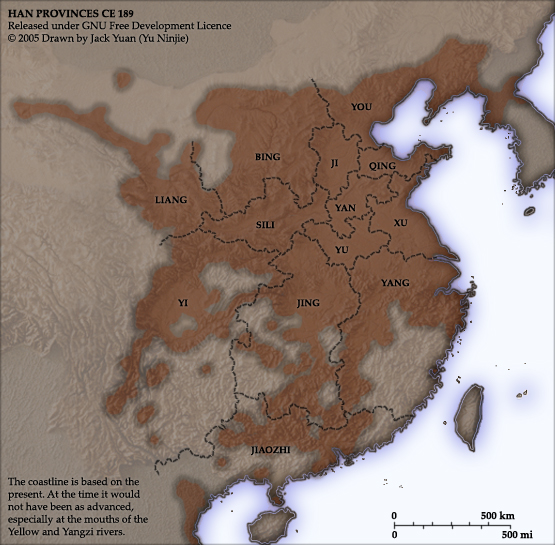
Map of Chinese provinces in the prelude of Three Kingdoms period (In the late Han dynasty period, 189 AD).

In 106 BC, during the Western Han dynasty (206 BC – 9 AD), Emperor Wu divided the Han Empire into thirteen administrative divisions, of which Bingzhou was one. Bingzhou covered most of present-day Shanxi and parts of Hebei and Inner Mongolia. During the Eastern Han dynasty (25–220) Bingzhou's capital was designated in Jinyang County (晉陽縣; present-day Jinyuan District, Taiyuan, Shanxi), and the regions under its jurisdiction included most of present-day Shanxi, northern Shaanxi and parts of Inner Mongolia. In 213 Bingzhou was absorbed into another administrative division, Jizhou (or Ji Province). Near the end of the Eastern Han dynasty, during a succession dispute among the heirs of the warlord Yuan Shao (d. 202), Bingzhou eventually came under the control of Yuan's rival, Cao Cao (155–220). Yuan Shao's nephew Gao Gan surrendered to Cao in 203, rebelled in 205, but was defeated and killed by Cao in 206, and Bing Province was definitively annexed. Cao Cao moved Xiongnu herdsmen into Bingzhou and the adjacent Ordos Desert. By the 280s approximately 400,000 Xiongnu lived there, who later founded the states of Han-Zhao (304–319) and Later Zhao (319–351).

=== Three Kingdoms period ===
Bingzhou was restored in 220 under the Cao Wei regime during the Three Kingdoms period (220–280) but the area under its control was reduced as compared to during the Eastern Han dynasty.

=== Sixteen Kingdoms period ===
In 396 during the Sixteen Kingdoms period (304–439), Bingzhou's capital was in Puban County (蒲坂縣; southwest of present-day Yongji, Shanxi), and the areas it covered were mainly in present-day southwestern Shanxi. Bingzhou was abolished in 399.
