= Fall of Chang'an =

Fall of Western Jin capital to Han-Zhao (316)

- Part of Upheaval of the Five Barbarians
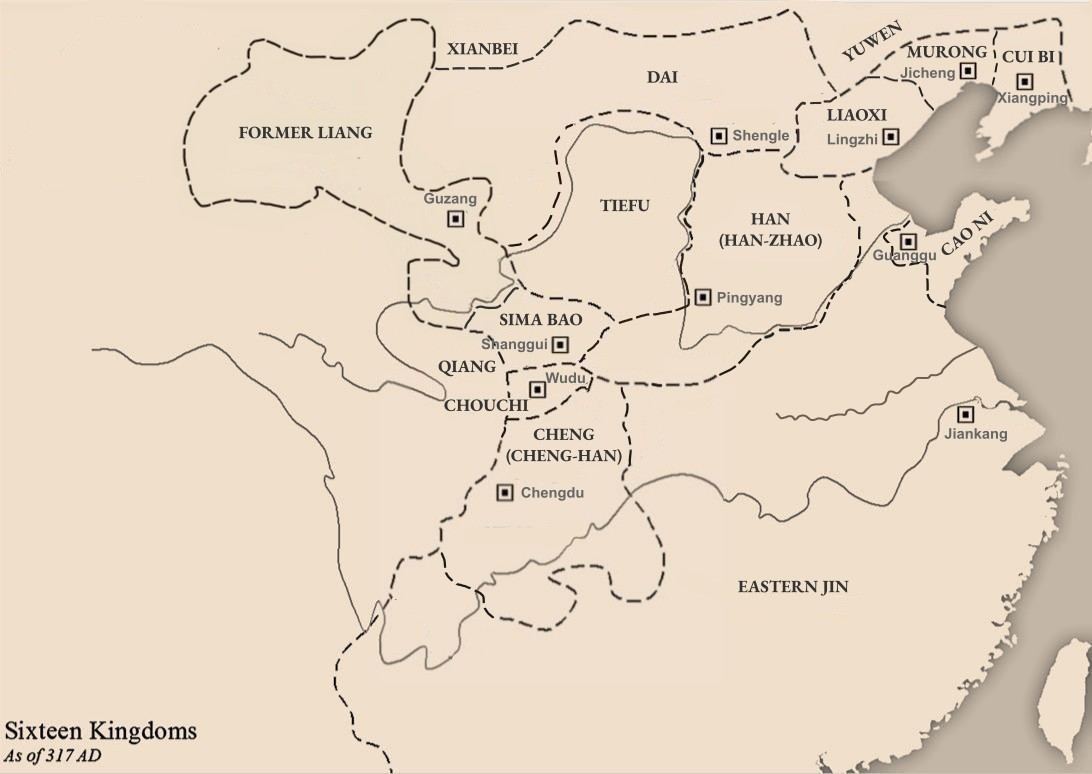
- Map of China shortly after the fall of Chang'an in December 316.
Date	August or September–11 December 316 AD
Location	Xi'an, Shaanxi
Result	Han victory; Emperor Huai surrenders

Belligerents
Han-Zhao	Western Jin

Commanders and leaders
Liu Yao	Emperor Huai of Jin (surrendered); Qu Yun (surrendered); Suo Chen (executed)

Strength
Unknown	Unknown

Fall of Chang'an
- Traditional Chinese: 長安之戰
- Simplified Chinese: 长安之战
Transcriptions
Standard Mandarin
- Hanyu Pinyin: Cháng'ān zhī zhàn

The Fall of Chang'an, also known as the Battle of Chang'an, was fought between the states of Han-Zhao and Western Jin from August to 11 December 316 during the Sixteen Kingdoms period of China. The battle, as part of the Han general Liu Yao's third and final invasion of Chang'an, concluded in a Han victory with the surrender of Emperor Huai of Jin, signalling the end of the Western Jin and paving the way for the establishment of the Eastern Jin in the south at Jiankang.

== Background ==
Shortly after the fall of Luoyang during the Disaster of Yongjia, Han forces marched west to capture Chang'an in August or September 311 and captured the city from the Prince of Nanyang, Sima Mo. Chang'an remained under Han control for only a few months, as Jin loyalists in the Guanzhong region, led by the general Jia Ya soon rose up and placed Chang'an under siege with the help of the local Qiang and Di tribes. In May or June 312, the Han prince Liu Yao was defeated and evacuated the city with more than 80,000 people east to the Han capital, Pingyang.

On 19 October, Jia Ya and his allies acclaimed Sima Chi, the nephew of the captured Emperor Huai of Jin, as the new emperor. Chi, posthumously known as Emperor Min, was only 12 years old at the time. Real power was held by his generals, in particular Jia Ya, Yan Ding, Qu Yun and Suo Chen. In the following months, Jia Ya was killed during a battle with the Lushuihu tribes, while Yan Ding was killed as part of a plot between Qu Yun and Suo Chen, thus leaving the emperor in the hands of the two men.

== First invasion of Chang'an (313) ==
In June 313, Liu Yao was ordered to attack Chang'an with Qiao Zhiming and Zhao Ran. In response, Qu Yun went out to set camp at Huangbai (黃白; northeast of Sanyuan County, Shaanxi) while Liu Yao camped at Puban (蒲阪; present-day Yongji, Shanxi). Liu Yao battled Qu Yun several times at Huangbai and defeated him each time, prompting the Jin court to dispatch Suo Chen to reinforce him in September or October.

Zhao Ran speculated that the Jin had brought most of the soldiers out to fight, leaving Chang'an defenseless. Thus, he brought with him 5,000 elite cavalry to launch a night raid into Chang'an. His forces broke through the outer walls, forcing Emperor Min to hide in the Sheyan Tower (射鴈樓). He also set fire to the enemy barracks and killed or plundered more than a thousand people before withdrawing to the Xiaoyao Garden (逍遙園). When the Jin general, Qu Jian (麴鑒), brought 5,000 soldiers to rescue the capital, Zhao Ran retreated, enticing Qu Jian to pursue him. At Lingwu (零武; around present-day Xianyang, Shaanxi), Qu Jian was met with Liu Yao, who dealt him a great defeat.

However, Liu Yao became complacent after his string of victories and did not consider setting up his defenses. In November or December, Qu Yun carried out a surprise attack on Liu Yao, routing him and killing Qiao Zhiming. Consequently, Liu Yao retreated back to Pingyang.

== Second invasion of Chang'an (314) ==
In June or July 314, Liu Yao and Zhao Ran attacked Chang'an again. During the assault, Suo Chen fought and defeated Zhao Ran in the west of the city. The Han forces were then joined by the general, Yin Kai (殷凱) and advanced towards Chang'an again. Initially, they defeated Qu Yun at Pingyi, but the Jin general was able to regroup his army and killed Yin Kai during a night raid on his camp. Liu Yao decided to abandon the campaign and return east to fight against Jin general, Guo Mo at Henei commandery. Zhao Ran was left to continue on his own, and in autumn, he was killed by a crossbow bolt while fighting Qu Yun at Beidi.

== Prelude ==
=== Pingyi and Shang ===
On 16 September 315, while on his campaign against the Jin Inspector of Bing province, Liu Kun, Liu Yao received a message from the Han emperor, Liu Cong, ordering him to invade Chang'an again. Liu Yao complied and turned back to Puban. Liu Yao then invaded Beidi, but when he heard that Qu Yun had left Huangbai and camped at Lingwu to resist him, he bypassed the commandery to attack Pingyi and Shang. Qu Yun was reluctant to proceed, as he had very few troops under his command who were suffering from severe hunger. Thus, Pingyi and Shang eventually fell to Liu Yao as their administrators fled the commanderies.

At the time, the Guanzhong region was suffering from extreme famine, and many of the Jin administrators west of Chang'an had stopped sending tribute and aid to the court. Qu Yun recommended Suo Chen that they flee west with Emperor Huai to join the Prince of Nanyang, Sima Bao in Qin province, but fearing that the prince would take advantage of the emperor for himself, Suo Chen rejected his idea.

=== Beidi ===
In July or August 316, Liu Yao besieged Administrator of Beidi, Qu Chang (麴昌), so Qu Yun brought with him 30,000 soldiers to relieve the commandery capital. Liu Yao set fire to parts of the city, causing smoke to blot out the sky and be seen from afar. He also sent his soldiers to feign surrender to Qu Yun and inform him that the city had fallen. Qu Yun believed them, and his soldiers scattered as the rumours spread within his camp. Liu Yao chased them and routed Qu Yun at Panshi Valley (磻石谷, in present-day Tongchuan, Shaanxi), forcing him to retreat back to Lingwu. The Qiang chieftain, Dajunxu (大軍須), sent supplies to support Qu Chang, but he was defeated by the Han general, Liu Ya. A few days later, Qu Chang fled to Chang'an, and Liu Yao conquered Beidi. He then marched to Jingyang, and the Jin forces north of the Wei River all dispersed.

== The battle ==
In August or September, Liu Yao marched towards Chang'an. The Inspector of Liang province, Zhang Shi, sent 5,000 soldiers to reinforce Chang'an, as did Sima Bao, who sent his general, Hu Song (胡崧) with troops. Hu Song defeated Liu Yao at Lingtai (靈臺; east of Huyi, Shaanxi), but because of his distrust for Qu Yun and Suo Chen's power over the emperor, he camped north of the Wei River without moving any further before withdrawing to Huaili (槐里; in present-day Xingping, Shaanxi). Jiao Song from Anding, Zhu Hui (竺恢) from Xinping (新平; around present-day Bin County, Shaanxi) and Song Zhe (宋哲) from Huayin also came to support the capital, while the official, Hua Ji (華輯), brought soldiers from the commanderies of Jingzhao, Pingyi, Hongnong and Shangluo to camp at Bashang (霸上, in modern Xi'an, Shaanxi). However, because they feared the strength of the Han army, they also refused to advance.

Liu Yao attacked and captured the walls of Chang'an, forcing Qu Yun and Suo Chen to hole themselves up in the inner city. Stuck within their city, the famine worsened for the inhabitants, with the price of food skyrocketing and people resorting to cannibalism. More than half of the city succumbed to the famine, and many people abandoned their posts en masse. Even Emperor Min was affected, as by the end, he was only able to eat a few piles of yeast from the Imperial Warehouse. Of the defenders, only a thousand soldiers from Liang province were willing to fight to the death.

In November or December, with the food stores all depleted and no reinforcements in sight, Emperor Min decided to surrender to save his remaining soldiers and people in Chang'an, reportedly lamenting, "Lord Qu and Lord Su have misled me!" He sent his Palace Attendant, Zong Chang (宗敞), with a letter of surrender to Liu Yao, but he was secretly stopped by Suo Chen, who sent his own son to deliver a different letter. Suo Chen falsely claimed in the letter that there was still food to hold out for a year in Chang'an, but if Liu Yao offered him a high-ranking office and a ducal title, he could convince the entire city to surrender. Liu Yao beheaded his son and sent his head back in rejection. On 10 December, Zong Chang arrived at Liu Yao's camp with the real letter.

== Aftermath ==
On 11 December, Emperor Min came out of Chang'an on a goat cart with jade in his mouth and tied to a coffin. Accepting his surrender, Liu Yao burnt the coffin and retrieved the jade before sending him off to Pingyang. On 18 December, Min arrived and bowed in submission before Liu Cong, which reportedly caused Qu Yun to prostrate and weep. For the scene he caused, Qu Yun was imprisoned, where he killed himself, while Suo Chen was executed in Pingyang's marketplace for his treachery. The now-former emperor was made a marquis, but also a personal servant to Liu Cong. On 7 February 318, in an attempt to kill the resolve of Jin forces fighting around Luoyang, Liu Cong ordered the 18-year-old Emperor Min executed.

In January 317, when Emperor Min's surrender became known to the Prince of Langya, Sima Rui at Jiankang, he initially declared that he would launch a northern expedition, but nothing came of it. On 27 March, Song Zhe, who survived the aftermath of the fall, arrived at Jiankang claiming that he received Emperor Min's edict, which granted Sima Rui responsibility over every affair. Following the precedent of his ancestors, Sima Rui declared himself the Prince of Jin, and in April 318, after news of Min's death reached Jiankang, he ascended the throne, posthumously known as Emperor Yuan of Jin, and officially moved the imperial court south of the Yangtze River.

== Sources ==
- Lü, Simian (1948), A History of Jin, Northern and Southern Dynasties 两晋南北朝史, vol. 1, Shanghai: Kaiming Press
- Graff, David (2002), Medieval Chinese Warfare 300-900 (1 ed.), Routledge
- de Crespigny, Rafe (1991), "The Three Kingdoms and Western Jin: a History of China in the Third Century AD - II", East Asian History, no. 2, Faculty of Asian Studies, The Australian National University, pp. 143–165
- Book of Jin
- Zizhi Tongjian
