= Suo Chen =

General from the Jin Dynasty (died 316)

- 索綝

Guard General (衞將軍)
- In office 313–?
- Monarch: Emperor Min of Jin

Grand General of the Agile Cavalry (驃騎大將軍)
- In office 314–?
- Monarch: Emperor Min of Jin

Supervisor of the Masters of Writing (尚書僕射)
- In office 314–?
- Monarch: Emperor Min of Jin

Personal details
- Born: Unknown Dunhuang, Gansu Province
- Died: 316 Linfen, Shanxi Province
- Spouse: Lady Xun
- Children: Suo Shiyuan
- Parent: Suo Jing (father)
- Courtesy name: Juxiu (巨秀)

Suo Chen (died c.18 December 316), courtesy name Juxiu, was a military general of the Western Jin dynasty. He was a prominent member of the group at Anding to restore Jin authority in the north following the Disaster of Yongjia in July 311 and was Emperor Min's most powerful official alongside Qu Yun. Throughout Emperor Min's reign, he constantly clashed with the Han-Zhao general Liu Yao but was ultimately unable to halt Han's advances into Chang'an. After the fall of Chang'an in 316, Suo was executed for disloyalty, after he had used Emperor Min's surrender as a means to secure a high position for himself in the Han regime. His name can be rendered as Suo Lin.

== Early life and career ==
Suo Chen was from Dunhuang in Gansu province. His father Suo Jing (c.239 - c.late 303 (Note: Suo Jing's biography in Book of Jin recorded that he was 65 (by East Asian reckoning) when he died at the end of the Taian era (302-303) of Emperor Hui's reign, after Sima Yong marched against Luoyang.)), was an official of Jin and distinguished calligrapher (Note: Suo Jing and Wei Guan were collectively referred to as "One terrace, two wonders" due to their calligraphy skills. The two were also compared to the Eastern Han dynasty calligrapher, Zhang Zhi, and a common saying in their day was "[Wei] Guan received Boying's tendons, [Suo] Jing received Boying's flesh"; Boying is Zhang Zhi's courtesy name.) who often commended his son's talents. Suo Chen saw his first role in the government as an Abundant Talent candidate and Household Gentlemen. One time, it was said that Suo personally killed 37 men to avenge his elder brother. This feat earned him the reverence of the populace, and he soon found himself appointed to a succession of posts, all of which he served with distinction, with his most notable being Prefect of Chang'an.

During the War of the Eight Princes in 304, the Prince of Hejian, Sima Yong ordered Suo Chen and Zhang Fang to retrieve Emperor Hui of Jin, who was previously moved by Sima Ying from Luoyang to Ying's base at Ye; Yong wanted to move the emperor to his base in Chang'an (and also to secure the emperor as Sima Ying had been defeated by Wang Jun). After successfully doing so, Suo was appointed General of Hawkish Display. Following the victory of the Prince of Donghai, Sima Yue over Sima Yong in 306, Suo Chen was transferred to serve the Prince of Nanyang, Sima Mo (a younger brother of Sima Yue) in Xuchang.

In 306, Sima Mo's territory was invaded by the Han-Zhao prince, Liu Cong but Suo Chen repelled him. When Sima Mo was transferred to Chang'an in 307, Suo Chen followed him and became Administrator of Xinping (新平县, in present-day Henan). That same year, Liu Cong attacked Sima Mo again, so Suo was appointed General Who Maintains The West and Administrator of Pingyi. Suo was successful in maintaining the people's support, dissuading Han from attacking his domain.

== Restoring imperial authority in the north ==
Eventually, in July 311, Luoyang fell to Han and Emperor Huai of Jin was captured by Liu Cong (who by now was Emperor of Han). Shortly after, Sima Mo surrendered Chang'an after some resistance, and was subsequently executed by Liu Can. Having lost both the emperor and his superior, Suo Chen fled to Anding together with his colleagues Qu Yun and Liang Su (梁肅) to join its administrator, Jia Ya. Along the way, Suo Chen and the others encountered the sons of Jia Ya's officials and those from the Qiang and Di tribes in Anding being transported to Han to serve as hostages. Suo Chen freed them and brought them back to Jia Ya.

When the group arrived at Anding, they conspired with Jia to restore the Jin dynasty in northern China. Jia Ya agreed with their plan and was acclaimed General Who Pacifies the West. Jia Ya then led the group and their armies to capture Chang'an. The Inspector of Yongzhou, Qu Te (麴特), the Administrator of Fufeng, Liang Zong (梁綜) and Administrator of Xinping, Zhu Hui (竺恢) defected back to Jin when they heard that Jia's forces were coming. Liu Can sent his generals Zhao Ran (趙染) and Liu Ya (劉雅) to attack Xinping, but Suo Chen managed to defeat both of them. After Jia Ya defeated Liu Yao at Huangqiu (黃丘, northwest of present-day Tongchuan, Shaanxi) and Liu Can was driven back from Xinfeng (新豐县, in Jingzhao, modern-day Shaanxi), many people around the Chang'an region surrendered to Jia Ya, and the city was reclaimed. Hearing that Chang'an was in the process of liberation, a man named Yan Ding brought Emperor Huai's nephew, Sima Ye to Chang'an and Ye was declared the new Crown Prince.

Despite the group's initial success, they soon suffered a major setback the following year. Jia Ya was captured and killed during a skirmish against Han. Furthermore, Yan Ding and the Administrator of Jingzhao, Liang Zong fought with one another over authority which led to Yan Ding killing Liang Zong. Both Suo Chen and Qu Yun feared that Yan Ding had grown too powerful, so they used Liang Zong's death as a pretext to attack him. Yan Ding was defeated and fled to Yongzhou, where he was killed by the Di tribesman Dou Shou (竇首), who then sent his head back to Chang'an. Suo Chen took up Liang Zong's position as Administrator of Jingzhao.

== During Emperor Min's reign ==
In March 313, Emperor Huai of Jin was executed by Liu Cong. When news of his death reached Chang'an, Sima Ye mourned for him and soon assumed the imperial title for himself; he would be posthumously known as Emperor Min of Jin. He gave a number of his officials new appointments. Suo Chen was appointed Deputy Director of the Left of the Masters of Writing, acting Director of the Ministry of Personnel, and Intendant of Jingzhao. He was then also appointed as Guard General and as acting Grand Commandant, handling all national military affairs.

Within the same year, Han's general Liu Yao began his attack on Emperor Min's territory. With Zhao Ran, he attacked Qu Yun at his base in Huangbai (黃白城, in present-day Xianyang, Shaanxi) defeating him several times. Emperor Min ordered Suo Chen to aid Qu Yun and Suo managed to rout Liu Yao's general Huyan Mo (呼延莫). Soon, Qu Yun was able to fend off the attackers but not before Chang'an was devastated by Zhao Ran's raid. For Suo Chen's feats, he was made Duke of Shangluo commandery with a fief of ten thousand households. His wife Lady Xun (荀氏) was made Lady of Xinfeng and his son Suo Shiyuan (索石元) became his heir.

Liu Yao and Zhao Ran attacked Chang'an again in 314 and this time Suo Chen was sent to oppose Zhao Ran. Zhao did not think much of Suo but his advisor Lu Hui (魯徽) warned him not to underestimate him. Zhao Ran refused to heed his advice and fought Suo Chen west of Chang'an but was defeated. For repelling Zhao Ran, Suo was further promoted to Grand General of the Agile Cavalry and Supervisor of the Left of the Masters of Writing. He was granted authority over the Masters of Writing, allowing him to be in control of most of the government's affairs.

The next year, Suo Chen received the position of Supervisor of the Masters of Writing and as Chief Controller in and around Chang'an itself. Around the same time, Liu Yao was invading Beidi (北地, in present-day Qingyang, Gansu) and Qu Yun struggled to oppose him. Even worse, Chang'an and the region was suffering from a terrible famine at the time. Qu Yun wished to bring Emperor Min over to Sima Bao in Qinzhou who had a stronger army and base to oppose Han. Suo Chen turned down his suggestion, stating that Sima Bao would surely use the emperor for himself if they were to do that, so Qu no longer asked.

== Downfall and death ==
In 316, Liu Yao would besiege Chang'an for the last time. Emperor Min called his generals back to defend Chang'an but none of them dared to face Liu Yao. Sima Bao sent Hu Song (胡崧) to reinforce Chang'an but even though Hu had defeated Liu Yao along the way, he decided to turn back as he did not trust both Qu Yun and Suo Chen with their control over the emperor. Chang'an had not recovered from the famine, and with the ongoing siege, the people were cut off from supplies outside the city. Prices of food rose, and the citizens either resorted to cannibalism or abandoned their posts. Qu Yun and Suo Chen were pushed back into the inner city by Liu Yao. With no hope of winning, Emperor Min decided to surrender, lamenting, "It is Lord Qu and Lord Suo who have so mismanaged our affairs!"

Emperor Min sent his Palace Attendant, Zong Chang (宗敞) to present his letter of surrender to Liu Yao. Suo Chen secretly detained Zong and instead sent his son to advise Liu Yao. His son told Liu Yao that Chang'an can still hold out for a year, but if he were to give his father a high position in Han's government, he will surrender the city. However, Liu Yao rejected his proposal and executed him before sending his head to Suo. Emperor Min and his officials eventually surrendered to Han and was sent to Pingyang. For his act of disloyalty, Suo Chen was executed in the marketplace of Pingyang.
