= Qu Yun (Jin dynasty) =

Western Jin dynasty general (died 316)

- 麴允

Grand Commander (大都督)
- In office 315–316
- Monarch: Emperor Min of Jin

Personal details
- Born: Unknown Jincheng Commandery, Gansu Province
- Died: 316 Pingyang, Shanxi Province
- Posthumous name: Marquis Jiemin (節愍侯)

Qu Yun (died c.18 December 316), was a military general of the Western Jin dynasty. He was a prominent member of the group from Anding who swore to restore the Jin Dynasty in northern China following the Disaster of Yongjia and was one of Emperor Min of Jin's closest advisors in resisting Han-Zhao. Despite the group's early success, the regime was short-lived as the lack of support and trust among themselves led to it eventually being overwhelmed by Han's forces in 316. After Emperor Min's surrender, Qu Yun killed himself while imprisoned.

== Life ==
=== Reviving the Jin dynasty ===
Qu Yun was born in a prestigious gentry family in Jincheng Commandery in modern-day Gansu province, said to be as equally famous as another family called the You (游). Nothing is known of Qu Yun's early life but by 311, he was already a subordinate to the Prince of Nanyang, Sima Mo (a younger brother of Sima Yue, the Prince of Donghai) in Chang'an. After Chang'an fell and Sima Mo was executed by Han-Zhao forces in 311, he and his peer Suo Chen fled to Anding Commandery (安定郡, present-day Zhenyuan, Gansu province).

The Jin capital, Luoyang, also fell to Han forces earlier that year. At Anding, Qu Yun, Suo Chen and others plotted to revive the Jin dynasty in northern China. The conspirators decided to choose the Administrator of Anding, Jia Ya, to lead the plan in recapturing Chang'an from Han. The plan was successful as the group not only occupied Chang'an but also defeated the Han generals in a series of bouts. Not long after, Emperor Huai's nephew, Sima Ye was brought to Chang'an by Yan Ding and declared as the Crown Prince.

Despite the group's success that year, they suffered major setbacks in 312 after Jia Ya was killed in a skirmish. With Jia Ya's death, Qu Yun was appointed to succeed to his position as Inspector of Yongzhou. Meanwhile, Yan Ding assassinated the Administrator of Jingzhao, Liang Zong after they contested for control over the region. Both Qu Yun and Suo Chen were fearful of Yan Ding's growing power and used his killing of Liang Zong (梁綜) as a pretext to attack him. They, along with Zong's brother, Liang Su (梁肅), raised their troops and routed Yan Ding, causing him to flee deep into Yongzhou where the Di tribesman Dou Shou (竇首) killed him and sent his head back to Chang'an.

=== Battles with Liu Yao ===
When news of Emperor Huai's execution reached Chang'an in 313, Sima Ye ascended the throne and was known as Emperor Min. As new emperor, he appointed Qu Yun as Deputy Director of the Left of the Masters of Writing, General Who Leads The Army, Credential Bearer, Colonel of Western Rong Tribes, and chief of affairs of the Masters of Writing. Shortly after, the Han emperor, Liu Cong ordered his generals, Liu Yao and Zhao Ran to attack Chang'an. Qu Yun camped at Huangbai (黃白城, in present-day Xianyang, Shaanxi) to resist the invasion but the Han forces defeated him several times. With Qu Yun pinned down at Huangbai, Zhao Ran carried out a raid on Chang'an. Zhao Ran pillaged the city before retreating due to the arrival of Jin reinforcements. However, recent victories had made Liu Yao overconfident, causing him to lower his defences. Qu Yun took advantage and launched a successful surprise attack on Liu Yao. This defeat caused Liu Yao to retreat back to Han's capital in Pingyang.

The following year in 314, Liu Yao and Zhao Ran, along with Yin Kai (殷凱) once more threatened the capital. Qu Yun attempted to counterattack their forces at Pingyi but was driven back. Qu Yun regathered his soldiers and tried another plan. At night, Qu Yun raided Yin Kai's camp and killed him in the assault. Yin Kai's defeat prompted Liu Yao to move to Huai, where he fought the Administrator of Henei, Guo Mo for the time being. Zhao Ran decided to attack Beidi (北地郡, in present-day Qingyang, Gansu) and fought Qu Yun but was killed by a crossbow bolt during the battle.

Despite the deaths of his fellow generals, Liu Yao once more attacked the Jin forces in 315 through Beidi. Emperor Min appointed Qu Yun as Grand Commander and as General of the Agile Cavalry and ordered him to oppose Liu Yao. However, Qu Yun could do nothing but wait at Huangbai as he had too little troops with him to oppose Liu Yao. Qu Yun suggested to Suo Chen that they bring the emperor to the Prince of Nanyang, Sima Bao in Qinzhou who had a larger force to oppose Han, but Suo Chen rebuked him by saying that Sima Bao will surely take control of the emperor's power. Qu Yun agreed and never brought up the plan again.

Liu Yao's invasion of Beidi carried on to 316. The Administrator of Beidi, Qu Chang (麴昌), was besieged by Liu Yao, so Qu Yun led his men to reinforce him. Liu Yao burned parts of the city and sent defectors to Qu Yun, who told him that Beidi had already fallen. Qu Yun believed them, and the rumour spread among his soldier, causing them to scatter in fear. Liu Yao defeated Qu Yun at Panshi Valley (磻石谷, in present-day Tongchuan, Shaanxi), so Qu retreated to Lingwu. Qu Yun had a reputation of being kind-hearted and giving many titles to his subordinates and allowing them to exercise their own power freely. However, when Liu Yao attacked him, many of them refused to aid Qu Yun, such as in the case of Jiao Song (焦嵩), who, when asked by Qu to aid him in protecting the capital from Han, decided to wait until Qu Yun was deep in trouble to save him.

=== Defeat and death ===
Liu Yao pressed into Chang'an that same year. Emperor Min's generals were called to camp at Bashang (霸上, located east of Xi'an) to defend but none of them dared to come. Sima Bao sent his general Hu Song (胡崧) to help but, despite routing Liu Yao on his way, decided to turn back as he did not trust Qu Yun and Suo Chen. Liu Yao arrived at Chang'an and forced Qu Yun and Suo Chen to fall back into the inner city. The situation in Chang'an was severe as food supplies were being cut off from the city due to the siege. The prices of food rose sharply and many resorted to cannibalism while others deserted their post. The Imperial Warehouse had so little food that Qu Yun only had gruel to present to the emperor for him to eat. With no food and reinforcements, Emperor Min decided to surrender to Liu Yao, lamenting, "It is Lord Qu and Lord Suo who have so mismanaged our affairs!"

Emperor Min and his officers were sent to Pingyang to face Liu Cong. When Emperor Min bowed in submission before Liu Cong, Qu Yun prostrated himself and wailed. Liu Cong was angered by this and ordered Qu Yun to be imprisoned. While in prison, Qu Yun killed himself. Liu Cong was impressed by Qu's loyalty, so he posthumously appointed Qu as General of Chariots and Cavalry and named him "Marquis Jiemin (節愍侯)".
