= Sili Province =

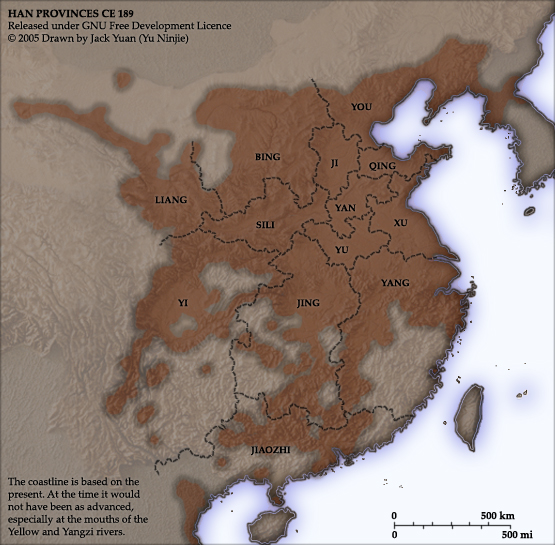
Provinces of the Eastern Han dynasty in 189 CE.

Sili Province or Silizhou (司隸州), in the 5th century reconstituted as Si Province or Sizhou (司州), also known as the capital province or the imperial province, was a province of ancient China. It encompassed the two Han dynasty capitals of Chang'an and Luoyang, and was bordered in the west by Liang Province.

Sili Province was governed by the Director of Retainers (司隸 Sī Lì). The province consisted of the commanderies of Henan (around Luoyang), Hedong, Henei, Hongnong, Jingzhao, Youfufeng and Zuopingyi (around Chang'an).

In the early 5th century, the former Sili Province was reconstituted as Si Province or Sizhou by Liu Yu, the future founder of the Liu Song dynasty.

== See also ==
- Zhili
- Zhongshu Sheng
