= Sima Mo =

Western Jin Prince of Nanyang (died 311)

Sima Mo 司馬模

Prince of Nanyang (南阳王)
- Tenure: c.November 306 – c.October 311
- Successor: Sima Bao
- Born: Unknown (Note: Sima Mo's eldest son Sima Bao was born in 294. In addition, Sima Xiao's (born in 270) biography in Book of Jin recorded that he was younger than Mo. (虓与从兄平昌公模...) Jin Shu, vol.37. Thus, Sima Mo's birth year should be before 270.)
- Died: c.October 311
- Issue: Sima Bao; Sima Li
- House: Jin dynasty
- Father: Sima Tai

Sima Mo (司馬模) (died c.October 311), courtesy name Yuanbiao (元表), was a Western Jin imperial prince. He was the youngest brother of Sima Yue, Prince Xiaoxian of Donghai, a regent for Emperor Hui and Emperor Huai. He was also the father of Sima Bao, who briefly contended for the position of emperor after Emperor Min was captured by Han-Zhao forces.

== Background ==
Sima Mo was the youngest son of Sima Tai (司馬泰; posthumously known as Prince Wenxian of Gaomi (高密文献王)), who was a son of Sima Yi's brother Sima Kui (司馬馗), making Mo a second cousin of Jin's founding emperor Emperor Wu.

When Sima Mo was young, he was noted to be studious. Among members of the Sima clan, he, his cousin Sima Xiao (Prince of Fanyang), and Sima Rui (the future Emperor Yuan) were praised. Sima Mo's first title was Duke of Pingchang. Despite their distant relationship to the emperor's family, Mo and his brothers, Sima Yue, Sima Teng and Sima Lue were all renowned members of the imperial clan.

== War of the Eight Princes ==
On 4 February 305, as part of the Prince of Hejian, Sima Yong's plan to reconcile with Sima Yue and end the civil war, he appointed Sima Mo as General Who Stabilizes The North and Chief Controller of Ji province, tasked with guarding the city of Ye. Ye had just been sacked and abandoned by the Chief Controller of You province, Wang Jun, so Sima Yue was able to send his brother to the city.

Despite Sima Yong's efforts, war eventually broke out in late 305 when Sima Yue began a coalition against him. Sima Mo sided with his brother, but early in the campaign, his base was threatened by a popular revolt led by Gongshi Fan. Many of Mo's followers intended to join the revolt, causing him to panic, but the Administrator of Guangping, Ding Shao (丁邵) led his army to assist him, as did Sima Xiao's general, Gou Xi. The Jin army forced the rebels to retreat, and Mo was so grateful for Ding Shao that he erected a monument at Ding Shao's hometown to commemorate his deeds.

With Gongshi Fan away, Sima Mo sent his general, Song Zhou (宋冑) to attack Heqiao (河穚; southwest of present-day Mengzhou, Henan). Song Zhou led a brutal campaign against Sima Yong's general, Lou Bao (樓褒), and after defeating him, Mo sent another general, Feng Song (馮嵩) to join Song Zhou in his march on Luoyang. The two generals then joined Sima Yue in his final push against Sima Yong's base in Chang'an, helping him return Emperor Hui back to Luoyang.

== Administration of Guanzhong ==
For his merits in the war, in c.September 306, Sima Mo was appointed Grand General Who Guards the East and transferred to Xuchang. Two months later, (Note: That year had a leap 8th month.) his peerage was promoted to the Prince of Nanyang. In early 307, Sima Yue offered the government position of situ to Sima Yong, who was able to reclaim Chang'an and hole up in the city. Yong, believing he had been pardoned, left his city for Luoyang, but when he got to Xin'an (新安, near Luoyang), he was intercepted by Sima Mo's general Liang Chen (梁臣) and strangled to death. On 18 May 307, after Sima Yue moved his base to Xuchang, he also repositioned his brothers to guard key locations. Sima Mo was appointed Grand General who Conquers the West and Chief Controller of Qin, Yong, Liáng and Yi provinces, and was garrisoned at Chang'an to replace Sima Yong in guarding the Guanzhong region.

During his tenure, Guanzhong suffered from a great famine and epidemic. Many of Guanzhong's inhabitants began eating each other as bandits ran rampant in the region. Sima Mo planned on melting down copper statues and bronze tripods into cooking utensils to sell them in exchange for food, but his followers advised against it. Sima Yue thought that Mo was not capable in the role he was in, and attempted to recall him to Luoyang, where he would serve as Minister of Works. However, Mo's advisor, Chunyu Ding (淳于定) persuaded his prince to stay, so Mo ignored Yue's order and remained at Chang'an. Yue, who was in the east at the time fighting against the Han-Zhao dynasty, was unable to take action against his brother.

In 309, a native from Pingyang (平陽; in modern Linfen, Shanxi), Liu Mangdang (劉芒蕩) proclaimed himself as a descendant of the Han dynasty and allied himself with the tribes around Mount Malan (馬蘭山) in Beidi Commandery to raise an army. Sima Mo sent Chunyu Ding to quell the rebellion, and he had Mangdang and all his followers executed.

In early 311, Mo recommended for his son, Sima Bao to be appointed General of the Household Gentlemen of the West and Colonel of Eastern Qiang Tribes and had him stationed at Shanggui. The Inspector of Qin province, Pei Bao (裴苞), opposed the decision, so Mo sent his general, Chen An to attack him. Pei Bao fled to the administrator of Anding Commandery (安定郡, present-day Zhenyuan, Gansu province), Jia Ya, who sheltered him. The Inspector of Yong province Ding Chuo (丁綽) had previously slandered Jia Ya to Sima Mo, so he also sent another general, Xie Ban (謝班), to campaign against him. Jia Ya retreated to the Lu River, but he later recaptured Anding and killed Xie Ban with the help of the chieftains Peng Dangzhong (彭蕩仲) and Dou Shou (竇首). He also forced Ding Chuo to flee, so the emperor pardoned Jia Ya and appointed him as the new Inspector of Yong province.

== Death ==
In April 311, Sima Yue died of illness near Xuchang, and the imperial army under him was annihilated by Han forces the following month. In July that same year, Emperor Huai of Jin was captured by Han after the fall of the capital Luoyang in the Disaster of Yongjia. Although Yue had entrusted him to an important position, Sima Mo did not appear to have lent his brother assistance in averting the crisis. In response to the fall of Luoyang, he merely sent his general, Zhao Ran to defend the strategic city of Puban (蒲坂; southwest of present-day Yongji, Shanxi). However, after Sima Mo denied his request to be appointed the Administrator of Pingyi, an angered Zhao Ran surrendered his forces to Han instead.

In c.October 311, Han sent Zhao Ran and Liu Can to attack Sima Mo at Chang'an. Zhao Ran defeated the prince at Tong Pass before marching as far as Xiagui (下邽, in modern Weinan, Shaanxi). As the Han forces besieged Chang'an, Mo sent Chunyu Ding out to fight them, but was defeated. The granaries and warehouses in Chang'an were empty, and many of Mo's soldiers and generals had fled. At the advice of Wei Fu (韋輔), Sima Mo decided to surrender to Zhao Ran, hoping to be spared. However, Zhao Ran instead denounced his former superior for his crimes and sent him to Liu Can, who had him executed.

After Sima Mo's death, his subordinates, most notably Qu Yun and Suo Chen, fled to Anding Commandery, where they allied with Jia Ya and restored imperial authority in Chang'an by installing Emperor Min of Jin as crown prince in October 312. Sima Bao also survived his father in Qin province, where he later attempted to claim the imperial title for himself before dying in 320.
