= Zhang Mao =

Chinese prince of Former Liang from 320 to 324

Zhang Mao 張茂
- Prince of Former Liang

ruler of Former Liang
- Reign: 320–324
- Predecessor: Zhang Shi
- Successor: Zhang Jun
- Born: 277
- Died: 324 (aged 46–47)
Names
- Zhang Mao (張茂)
Era name and dates
- Jiànxīng (建興) (Note: Used the era name of Emperor Min of Jin.): 320–324
Regnal name
- 320–323: Given tally; General to Pacify the West; Governor of Liang Province (使持節 平西將軍 涼州牧); Since 323: Given tally; Temporary given Yellow axe; Palace Attendant; Commander in charge of military affairs in Liang, Southern and Western Qin, Liang, Yi, Ba, Han, Longyou, Western Region barbarians and Xiongnu; Grand Preceptor; Grand Marshal; Governor of Liang Province; Protector of the Western Regions; Colonel to Guard the Di and Qiang people; Prince of Liang (使持節 假黃鉞 侍中 都督涼南北秦梁益巴漢隴右西域雜夷匈奴諸軍事 太師 領大司馬 涼州牧 領西域大都護 護氐羌校尉 涼王)
Posthumous name
- Prince Chenglie (成烈王, honored by Han Zhao); Prince Cheng (成王, honored by Zhang Zuo)
Temple name
- Taizong (太宗, honored by Zhang Zuo)
- Dynasty: Former Liang
- Father: Zhang Gui

Zhang Mao

courtesy name Chengxun
- Traditional Chinese: 成遜
- Simplified Chinese: 成逊
Transcriptions
Standard Mandarin
- Hanyu Pinyin: Chéngxùn
Middle Chinese
- Middle Chinese: /d͡ʑiᴇŋ suən^{H}/

formally Prince Chenglie of (Former) Liang
- Chinese: (前)涼成烈王
Transcriptions
Standard Mandarin
- Hanyu Pinyin: (Qián) Liáng Chéngliè wáng
Middle Chinese
- Middle Chinese: /d͡zen lɨɐŋ d͡ʑiᴇŋliᴇt̚ ɦʉɐŋ/

Duke Cheng of Xiping
- Chinese: 西平成公
Transcriptions
Standard Mandarin
- Hanyu Pinyin: Xīpíng Chéng Gōng
Middle Chinese
- Middle Chinese: /seibˠiæŋ d͡ʑiᴇŋ kuŋ/

Posthumous name: (Han Zhao)
- Chinese: 成烈
- Literal meaning: "successful and achieving"
Transcriptions
Standard Mandarin
- Hanyu Pinyin: Chéngliè
Middle Chinese
- Middle Chinese: /d͡ʑiᴇŋliᴇt̚/

Posthumous name: (Internal)
- Chinese: 成
- Literal meaning: "successful"
Transcriptions
Standard Mandarin
- Hanyu Pinyin: chéng
Middle Chinese
- Middle Chinese: /d͡ʑiᴇŋ/

Zhang Mao (Chinese: 張茂; pinyin: Zhāng Mào; 277–324), courtesy name Chengxun (成遜), formally Prince Chenglie of (Former) Liang ((前)涼成烈王) (posthumous name given by Han-Zhao) or Duke Cheng of Xiping (西平成公) (posthumous name used internally in Former Liang) was a ruler of the Chinese Former Liang state. During the brief reign of his grandnephew Zhang Zuo, he was honored as Prince Cheng of Liang (涼成王).

== Early career ==
Zhang Mao first appeared in history in 308 when his father, Zhang Gui (張軌), the first Zhang Duke of Xiping and governor of Liang Province (涼州, modern central and western Gansu), suffered a stroke and was unable to speak, and therefore had Zhang Mao act as governor during his illness. When the unrelated Zhang Yue (張越) and Cao Que (曹怯) tried to take advantage of Zhang Gui's illness to have him replaced, the Zhangs resisted and convinced the powerful Sima Mo (司馬模) the Prince of Nanyang that Zhang Gui should remain governor. At this time, Zhang Gui's oldest son and Zhang Mao's older brother Zhang Shi (張寔), who had previously been at Chang'an, returned to Liang Province and defeated and killed Cao, reaffirming the Zhangs' rule over the province.

During the subsequent governorship of Zhang Shi, Zhang Mao was one of his trusted generals. In 320, the magician Liu Hong (劉弘), who had spread rumors that the gods wished for him to be the ruler of Liang Province, convinced two of Zhang Shi's guards Yan She (閻涉) and Zhao Ang (趙卬) to assassinate Zhang Shi. Zhang Mao had Liu Hong arrested and executed by drawing and quartering. Because Zhang Shi's son Zhang Jun was still young (13 at the time), Zhang Shi's subordinates requested that Zhang Mao take over as governor and the Duke of Xiping, and he did so while also issuing a general pardon for the people in his domain.

== As ruler ==
Zhang Mao initially continued to claim to be a Jin vassal, as a governor and a duke. He appointed Zhang Jun, his nephew, as his heir. (Historical accounts are not clear whether Zhang Mao had sons of his own.) In 321, he started the construction of an impressive tower known as Lingjun Tower (靈鈞台), but after Yan Zeng (閻曾) persuaded him that it was too costly and that Zhang Gui would have disapproved, he stopped the construction.

In 322, Zhang Mao had his general Han Pu (韓璞) seize the Longxi (隴西) and Nan'an (南安, together roughly modern Dingxi, Gansu) Commanderies – which appeared to be then under nominal Han-Zhao control, while Han forces were battling the rebel Chen An, extending his domain east of the Yellow River.

However, in 323, after the Han emperor Liu Yao defeated Chen An, he continued on and reached the Yellow River, claiming to be ready to cross it. Zhang went into a battle posture, but negotiated peace, agreeing to submit to Han authority and offering tributes of horses, livestock, and jewels. Liu Yao created him the Prince of Liang and granted him the nine bestowments. Subsequently, Zhang Mao resumed the construction on Lingjun Tower, stating that its construction was necessary for defensive purposes, and strengthened the defenses of the capital Guzang (姑臧, in modern Wuwei, Gansu).

In summer 324, Zhang Mao grew ill. He told his nephew Zhang Jun to remain faithful to Jin, and also ordered that he not be buried as a prince, since his princely title was not granted by the Jin emperor. He died soon thereafter.

== Era name ==
Most historical sources indicate that Zhang Mao, like his brother Zhang Shi, continued to use Emperor Min of Jin's era name Jianxing (both to show continued allegiance to Jin and to distance himself from Emperor Yuan of Jin and his line) but some sources indicate that he changed era name to Yongguang (永光 yǒng guāng 320–323). A current theory is that his era name was used internally while the Jianxing era name was used when communicating with other states.

== Notes ==
Prince Cheng of (Former) Liang House of Zhang Born: 277 Died: 324
Chinese royalty
New title	Prince of Former Liang; 323–324	Succeeded by Zhang Jun
Chinese nobility
Preceded by Zhang Shi	Duke of Xiping; 320–324	Succeeded by Zhang Jun
