= Chen An =

Jin dynasty general, Han Zhao general and King of Liang (died 323)

Chen An 陳安

King of Liang (涼王)
- Reign: 322 – 323

Inspector of Qinzhou (秦州刺史)
- In office 319 – 322
- Monarch: Liu Yao

Personal details
- Born: Unknown
- Died: 323
- Relations: Chen Ji (brother)
- Courtesy name: Huhou (虎侯)

Chen An (died August or September 323), courtesy name Huhou, was a Chinese military general and warlord of the Jin dynasty (266–420) and Han-Zhao during the Sixteen Kingdoms period. During the aftermath of the Disaster of Yongjia in northern China, Chen An became a favored general of the Jin prince Sima Bao in Qinzhou, but an assassination attempt on him made by one of Bao's subordinates in 315 prompted him to declare independence in Longcheng (隴城, in modern Qin'an County, Gansu). He submitted to the Zhao state in 319 but then rebelled in 322, declaring himself the King of Liang. His reign was short-lived, as he was defeated and executed by Zhao forces the following year.

Chen An was well-respected among his soldiers and those living in his territory. The people of Longshang (隴上; north of present-day Shaanxi and west of present-day Gansu) dedicated an ode in his memory, and the prestigious Tang dynasty poet Li Bai even wrote a poem based on him.

== Background ==
Chen An was born into a peasant family in Chengji County (成紀, in modern-day Tianshui, Gansu), Tianshui Commandery. It was said that one day, while reading, he exclaimed, "The true man possesses a crown and chariot and bears the staff of authority. How can I continue to plow and hoe for long?" He soon left his hometown for the capital, Luoyang, to study more books. During this time, he read the Book of Wei and gained an admiration for the Cao Wei military general, Xu Chu, so much so that he decided to change his courtesy name to Huhou (虎侯; meaning "Tiger Marquis", one of Xu Chu's nicknames).

After the War of the Eight Princes broke out in Jin, Chen An took the opportunity to establish ties with the ruling Sima family. He soon found himself serving the Prince of Nanyang, Sima Mo in Guanzhong as the Commandant of Sima Mo's personal tent. In 311, Sima Mo came into conflict with the Inspector of Qinzhou, Pei Bao (裴苞), so he sent Chen An to attack him. Chen An defeated Pei Bao and forced him to flee to Anding Commandery.

== Service under Sima Bao ==
However, not long after in c.October 311, Sima Mo was captured and killed by Han-Zhao forces in Chang'an. Chen An fled to Qinzhou and submitted to Mo's son, Sima Bao, who was serving as the provincial inspector at the time. In 315, Chen An commanded a successful campaign to suppress the rebelling Qiang tribes in Qinzhou. For his feats, Sima Bao showered him with great courtesy and respect.

Sima Bao's special treatment of Chen An was not taken well by one of Bao's officials, Zhang Chun (張春). Zhang Chun slandered Chen An to Sima Bao, claiming that he would rebel. Sima Bao was convinced by Zhang Chun's words, but he also could not bring himself to order Chen's execution. Taking matters into his own hands, Zhang Chun sent an assassin to kill Chen An, but Chen was only wounded by the assassin's blade before escaping to Longcheng. There, Chen An declared his autonomy and became a warlord. Although the two were now at odds, Chen An still respected Bao. He sent a messenger to Bao stating his promise to continuously pay tribute.

== As a warlord and submission to Han-Zhao ==
In 316, the Jin government in Chang'an fell to Han and Emperor Min of Jin became their captive. In early 317, Former Liang forces led by Han Pu were preparing to launch a counter-attack against Han, and Chen An involved himself to serve as a vanguard. The attack never took place, as Han Pu's forces met with difficulties in marching into Han territory.

Shortly after, Chen An allied himself with Han. He and another minor warlord named Jiao Song (焦嵩) invaded Sima Bao's territory in Longshi together with the Han general Liu Yao. Their invasion had a devastating effect, as a large portion of the Yongzhou and Qinzhou population was wiped out. Chen An and Jiao Song carried on their assault into the following year in 318, when they were now threatening Sima Bao's capital of Shanggui.

In 319, fulfilling his imperial ambition, Sima Bao declared himself the Prince of Jin. In response, Chen An named himself Inspector of Qinzhou and formally submitted to both Han and another state, Cheng-Han. As Chen An encroached into Shanggui, Sima Bao fled to Nan'an (南安; southeast of present-day Longxi County, Gansu) but reinforcements from Former Liang pushed Chen An back to Mianzhu, so Sima Bao returned to his capital. Chen An threatened Shanggui again not long after, but once again withdrew due to Liang reinforcements.

Sima Bao was killed by his subordinates Yang Ci (楊次) and Zhang Chun in c.July 320 over numerous disagreements (another source states he died of illness). Zhang Chun appointed a junior kinsman of Sima Bao named Sima Zhan (司馬瞻) to succeed Bao. Chen An petitioned Liu Yao (now Emperor of Former Zhao, having changed the state's name from Han in 319) to allow him to campaign against Sima Zhan, which Liu Yao permitted and promptly appointed Chen An Grand General. Chen An attacked Sima Zhan's forces and killed him, capturing Yang Ci and forcing Zhang Chun to flee to Fuhan (枹罕; southwest of present-day Linxia County, Gansu). Chen An beheaded Yang Ci before Sima Bao's coffin as a sacrifice and later buried his former lord at Shanggui. He then carried out funeral rites similar to those of the Son of Heaven and posthumously named Sima Bao "Prince Yuan".

== Rebellion and as King of Liang ==
In 322, Liu Yao was returning from a campaign in Chouchi. Although he forced Chouchi into submission, a plague had struck his army, and Liu Yao himself became deathly ill. While Liu Yao was returning, Chen An requested to meet with him, but due to his illness, Liu Yao turned him down. Chen An was offended at his rejection, so much so that he concluded that Liu Yao was dead. Before leaving to intercept the returning army, Chen An plundered Former Zhao's territory.

After reaching Liu Yao's party, Chen An was met with Liu's general, Huyan Shi (呼延寔) at the rear. Chen An ambushed and captured him but later invited him to join his army, still believing that Liu Yao had passed. However, Huyan Shi raised his voice at him and told him to kill him instead, causing Chen An to be enraged and kill him. He then had his brother, Chen Ji (陳集) to chase after Liu Yao but Chen Ji was killed in a counter-attack from Huyan Yu (呼延瑜).

Chen An retreated to Shanggui and had his generals subdue Qian County (汧縣; south of present-day Long County, Shaanxi). The Qiang and Di tribes of Longshang all surrendered to Chen An. Chen An then declared himself King of Liang and appointed a number of titles for himself. Lu Ping (魯憑), a former subordinate of Huyan Shi and Chen An's Army Advisor, wept and said to Chen An, "I cannot bear to see your death!" Chen took his remark negatively and had him beheaded. Before he died, Lu Ping told him, "After you've cut off my head, hang it up in the marketplace at Shanggui, so I can watch Zhao behead Chen An in turn!" Liu Yao heard of Lu Ping's death and thought that Chen An's inability to gather talents will be his downfall.

The following year in 323, Chen An besieged the Zhao general Liu Gong (劉貢) at Nan'an. He was greatly routed as enemy reinforcements led by Shi Wu (石武) arrived to assist Liu Gong. With his remaining cavalries, he fled back to Longcheng where he prepared to defend himself. In autumn, Liu Yao personally led an army to attack Longcheng while sending another to subjugate Shanggui. Chen An would usually come out and attack the invaders, but was defeated in all his bouts. Meanwhile, Liu Yao's general Liu Gan (劉幹) captured Pingxiang (平襄; in present-day Tianshui, Gansu) and prompted the counties of Longshang to surrender.

Chen An left his generals Yang Bozhi (楊伯支) and Jiang Chong'er (姜沖兒) to defend Longcheng while he led his elite cavalry to break through and flee to Xiazhong (陜中; south of present-day Qin'an County, Gansu). As he fled, Liu Yao sent his general, Ping Xian (平先) to pursue him. Chen An was said to have dual-wielded a great blade and a serpent spear, which he used to kill many of his pursuers. He also had a bow to dispatch enemy troops from afar as he fled. Ping Xian eventually caught up with him, and the two duelled with one another. In three bouts, Ping Xian managed to disarm Chen An's spear. However, night was approaching and there was a heavy downpour. Chen An used this to his advantage and slipped away into the hills with his followers.

The Zhao troops carried out searches but could not find him. The next day, Chen An sent his general Shi Rong (石容) to scout on the Zhao troops. However, Shi Rong was caught by the Zhao general Huyan Qingren (呼延青人). Shi Rong was interrogated and tortured but would not give away Chen An's location. In the end, he was killed, and Huyan Qingren instead used Shi Rong's traces to find Chen An. Chen An was discovered at the bend of a river gully, where he was subsequently captured and beheaded.

== Posthumous tributes ==
Chen An was said to have been very close to his generals and soldiers as he would subjugate himself to the same hardships that they went through. After he was killed, the people of Longshang were saddened, and decided to compose a song in honor of his recent death called "Ode to a Stalwart Warrior (壯士之歌)". When Liu Yao heard about this song, he grew sentimental and ordered it to be sung.

Chen An was also a subject of a poem written by the 8th century Tang dynasty poet, Li Bai. In his poem, "Song of the Sima General (司馬將軍歌)", he subtitled the poem with "On Behalf of Longshang Soldier Chen An (以代隴上健兒陳安)".
