= Liu Xi, Prince of Changli =

Liu Xi 劉襲
- Prince of Changle
- Died: After 329 CE
- Father: Liu Yao
- Mother: Yang Xianrong

Liu Xi (Chinese: 劉襲; pinyin: Liú Xí, fl. 319 CE) was a Chinese nobleman and prince of the Han-Zhao dynasty. The son of Han-Zhao emperor Liu Yao and his wife Yang Xianrong, he was created the Prince of Changle (長樂王) in 319.

== History ==
Liu Xi was the son Liu Yao, Emperor of Former Zhao, and of Empress Xianwen. He was similarly named to his brother Liu Xi (Chinese: 劉熙; pinyin: Liú Xī), albeit with a different second character/ tone on his name's second syllable (Chinese: 襲; pinyin: Xí). In 319, his mother was established as Empress, his nearly-namesake brother Liu Xi established as crown prince, his brother Liu Chan created as Prince of Taiyuan, and he as Prince of Changle.

Former Zhao ended in 329, and his brother the crown prince Liu Xi was defeated and killed.
