= Gao Heng (disambiguation) =

Gao Heng (高恆; 570–577) was an emperor of the Northern Qi dynasty of China.

Gao Heng is also the name of:

- Gao Heng (philologist) (高亨; 1900–1986), philologist and palaeographer
- Gao Heng (legal scholar) (高恒; 1930–2019), legal scholar and historian

== See also ==
- Gao Hong (disambiguation)
