= Yang Xianrong =

Consort of Emperors Hui of Jin and Liu Yao of Han-Zhao (died 322)

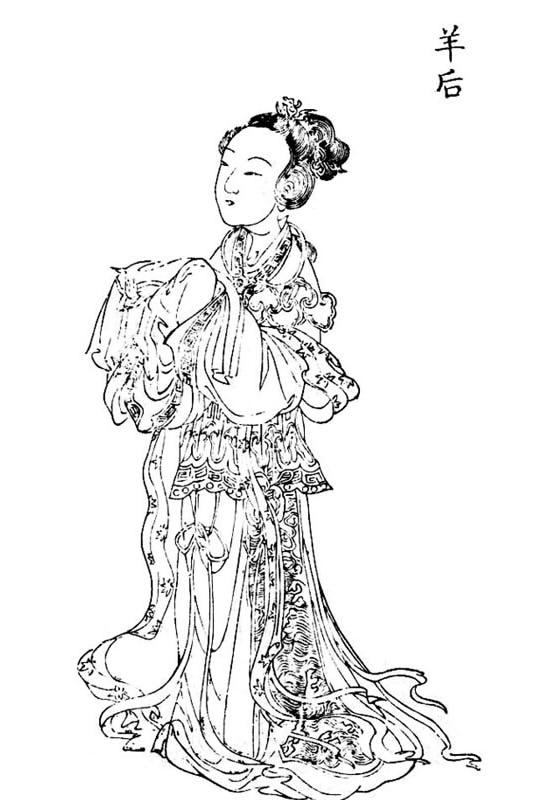

Empress consort of Western Jin Dynasty
- First Reign: 4 December 300 – February 304
- Second Reign: July – August 304
- Third Reign: November 304 – April 305
- Fourth Reign: November 305
- Fifth Reign: May 306 – 8 January 307 (Note: Emperor Hui died on 8 Jan 307.)
- Predecessor: Jia Nanfeng
- Successor: Empress Liang Lanbi

Empress consort of Han-Zhao
- Tenure: 319 – 13 May 322
- Predecessor: Empress Jin
- Successor: Empress Liu
- Born: unknown (Note: While Lady Yang's birth year and her age when she became empress to Emperor Hui were unrecorded, her birth year should be in or before 290.)
- Died: 13 May 322
- Spouse: Emperor Hui of Jin; Liu Yao
- Issue: Liu Xi, Crown Prince of Han-Zhao; Liu Xi, Prince of Changli; Liu Chan, Prince of Taiyuan
Posthumous name
- Empress Xianwen (獻文皇后) (Note: Conferred by Han-Zhao)
- Father: Yang Xuanzhi, Duke of Xingjin

Yang Xianrong (羊獻容) (died 13 May 322), posthumous name (as honored by Former Zhao) Empress Xianwen (獻文皇后, literally "the wise and civil empress"), was an empress—uniquely in the history of China, for two different dynastic empires and two different emperors. Her first husband was Emperor Hui of Jin, and her second husband was Liu Yao of Former Zhao. Also unique was that she was deposed four times and restored four times as empress of the Western Jin (Note: five, if one counts the brief usurpation by Sima Lun against her husband in 301).

== Background ==
Yang Xianrong was from Taishan Commandery (roughly modern Tai'an, Shandong). Her father was the mid-level official Yang Xuanzhi. Her maternal grandfather was the general Sun Qi, a distant relative of Sun Xiu, the chief strategist for Sima Lun the Prince of Zhao. Therefore, after Sima Lun and Sun overthrew Empress Jia Nanfeng in May 300, Sun had Yang Xianrong selected as the new empress in December of that year. Her ancestors include Xin Xianying (one of her great-grandmothers) and her father Xin Pi.

== As empress of Jin ==
Little is known about how her relationship with her developmentally disabled husband (save her words to her second husband) was; (Note: Yang Xianrong's biography in Book of Jin had no records of her life before her marriage to Emperor Hui.) she may have been the mother of a daughter, Princess Linhai. After Sima Lun briefly usurped the throne in 301 but was then defeated by Sima Jiong the Prince of Qi and Sima Ying the Prince of Chengdu, both Sun Xiu and Sun Qi were killed, along with their clans. Empress Yang's father Yang Xuanzhi was, however, promoted. (Note: However, Yang Xuanzhi would die in fear on 19 October 303, as his friendship with Sima Ai the Prince of Changsha was used as an excuse for Sima Ying and Sima Yong the Prince of Hejian to attack Sima Ai.)

As Emperor Hui continued to be a pawn of the princes during the War of the Eight Princes, Empress Yang herself appeared to have had little influence. She was, however, frequently used as an excuse for certain conspirators' actions, and during the span from 304 to 306 she was deposed four times and restored four times, often in conjunction with her husband's nephew Sima Tan's fortunes as crown prince. She was nearly killed after her fourth removal in December 305, as Sima Yong, who was holding Emperor Hui at Chang'an and left her in the capital Luoyang, became convinced that she was easily usable by his opponents as a rubber stamp, and so ordered that she be forced to commit suicide. The governor of the capital region, Liu Tun (Note: son of Jin official Liu Yi) offered a petition to save her life, which nearly cost him his own—as Sima Yong ordered to have him arrested, and he was barely able to flee to Qingzhou with his life, and join Sima Lue, Prince of Gaomi. However, after Liu's intercession, for whatever reason, Sima Yong cancelled the order to force her to commit suicide.

In 306, as the War of the Eight Princes neared its end and Emperor Hui was allowed to return to Luoyang after Sima Yue the Prince of Donghai defeated Sima Yong, he welcomed Yang back as his empress. In January 307, however, he was poisoned to death. (Note: Most historians believe that Sima Yue was behind the poisoning, but there is no conclusive evidence.) The recognized heir was Emperor Hui's half-brother, Sima Chi the crown prince, but Empress Yang, believing that she would not be honored as empress dowager if her brother-in-law inherited the throne, tried to have Sima Tan declared emperor; she was rebuffed by Sima Yue, however, and Crown Prince Chi succeeded to the throne as Emperor Huai. (Note: Her attempt might have cost Prince Tan his life, as Sima Yue had him executed on 24 March 308.) Emperor Huai honored her with the title "Empress Hui," but not empress dowager.

Empress Yang's influence during Emperor Huai's reign was unclear, but since Emperor Huai himself did not have much power (Note: Sima Yue still held onto much power.), it was not likely that Empress Yang had significant influence. After Sima Yue's death in April 311, the Jin armies were in shambles and unable to protect Luoyang any further. Luoyang soon fell to Han's armies in July (Disaster of Yongjia), led by the generals Huyan Yan, Wang Mi, Shi Le, and Liu Yao the Prince of Shi'an. Liu Yao burnt most of Luoyang and executed a large number of Jin officials, but did not kill Empress Yang; instead, he took her as his own wife.

== As empress of Former Zhao ==
Little is known about Yang Xianrong's life with Liu Yao, other than that she was favored by him and bore him three sons — Liu Xī, Liu Xí, and Liu Chan. (Note: It was not clear whether she was his wife or concubine by this point — Liu Yao had an earlier wife, Princess Bu, who was described as having died and having been princess when her son Liu Yin was made the Prince of Yong'an in 323.) Liu Yao, as the trusted cousin of the Han emperor Liu Cong, had many military responsibilities and was in charge of the Chang'an region after he captured it and Emperor Huai's successor Emperor Min in 316. In 318, after the Han prime minister Jin Zhun massacred the Han imperial family and nobles in the capital Pingyang (in modern Linfen, Shanxi) after a coup, the officials who fled from the massacre offered the throne to Liu Yao, who accepted. After his and Shi Le's forces defeated Jin's, he moved the capital to Chang'an.

In 319, he renamed the state from Han to Zhao, (Note: known as Former Zhao to distinguish from Shi Le's Later Zhao) created Yang Xianrong his empress and her son Liu Xī crown prince. Once, Liu Yao asked her: "How do I compare to the Sima man?" Her response was:

How can there be a comparison? Your Imperial Majesty is an empire-building intelligent ruler, while he was an idiot who destroyed his empire. He only had one wife and one son and could protect neither. He was an honored emperor, but he allowed his wife and son to be dishonored at the hands of commoners. At that time, all I wanted was death, and I did not know that I would have today. I was born from a noble family, but I thought that all men were like he. Only after I married you have I found out what a true man is like.

Liu Yao greatly favored her, and she was involved in governmental matters. She died in May 322. Her son Liu Xī would continue to be crown prince, but both Liu Yao and Liu Xī were killed by Shi Le's Later Zhao forces after Former Zhao fell to Later Zhao in 329.

== Notes ==
Chinese royalty
Preceded by Empress Jia Nanfeng	Empress of Jin Dynasty (266–420); 300–301, 301–304, 304, 304–305, 305, 306–307	Succeeded by Empress Liang Lanbi
Preceded by Empress Jia Nanfeng	Empress of China (Most regions); 300–301, 301–304, 304, 304–305, 305, 306–307	Succeeded by Empress Liang Lanbi
Preceded by Empress Jia Nanfeng	Empress of China (Southern Shanxi); 300–301, 301–304	Succeeded by Empress Huyan of Han-Zhao
Preceded by Empress Jia Nanfeng	Empress of China (Southwestern); 300–301, 301–304	Succeeded by Empress Ren of Cheng-Han
Preceded by Empress Jin	Empress of Han-Zhao; 319–322	Succeeded by Empress Liu
Preceded by Empress Jin	Empress of China (Western); 319–322	Succeeded by Empress Liu
Preceded by Empress Jin	Empress of China (Northern/Central); 319	Succeeded by Empress Liu of Later Zhao
