= Qu Yun =

Qu Yun may refer to:

- Qu Yun (Jin dynasty) (died 316), military general of the Jin dynasty
- Qu Yun (swimmer) (born 1978), Chinese butterfly stroke swimmer and coach
