= Liu Chan =

Liu Chan 劉闡
- Prince of Taiyuan
- Died: After 329 CE
- Father: Liu Yao
- Mother: Yang Xianrong

Liu Chan (Chinese: 劉闡; pinyin: Liú Chǎn, fl. 319–329 CE) was a Chinese nobleman of the Han-Zhao dynasty. He was created the Prince of Taiyuan (太原王) in 319.

== History ==
Liu Chan was the son of Former Zhao emperor Liu Yao (died 329) and his wife Empress Xianwen from Taishan Commandery. In 319 his father the emperor moved the capital of Former Zhao from Pingyang to Chang'an, and created his concubine and Liu Chan's mother Yang Xianrong as his empress, while Liu Chan's brother Liu Xi became the crown prince. Further, another brother of his, also named Liu Xi, received the title of Prince of Changli, whereas Liu Chan was named Prince of Taiyuan. What happened to him after demise of Former Zhao (329) is unknown.
