= Gao Hong =

Gao Hong could be:

- Gao Hong (composer) (Chinese: 高虹), a Chinese-American composer and performer of the Chinese pipa.
- Gao Hong (painter) (Chinese: 高虹), a native of Xinle, Hebei, a Chinese oil painter.
- Gao Hong (footballer) (Chinese: 高红), a Chinese former footballer.
- Gao Hong (chemist) (Chinese: 高鸿), a native of Jingyang, Shaanxi, analytical chemist and educator, member of the Chinese Academy of Sciences.
- Gao Hong (politician) (Chinese: 高鸿), Vice-chairman of the Anhui Provincial Committee of the Chinese People's Political Consultative Conference.
