= Streptomyces alfalfae =

Scientific classification
- Domain: Bacteria
- Kingdom: Bacillati
- Phylum: Actinomycetota
- Class: Actinomycetia
- Order: Streptomycetales
- Family: Streptomycetaceae
- Genus: Streptomyces
- Species: S. alfalfae

Binomial name
- Streptomyces alfalfae She et al. 2016

Type strain
- CCTCC AA2015019, KCTC 39571, XY25

Synonyms
- Streptomyces alfalae

Species of bacterium

Streptomyces alfalfae is a bacterium species from the genus Streptomyces which has been isolated from rhizosphere soil from an alfalfa field in Jingyang in China.

== See also ==
- List of Streptomyces species
