= Liu Fang (disambiguation) =

Liu Fang (born 1974) is a Chinese musician and pipa virtuoso.

Liu Fang may also refer to:

== People ==
- Empress Liu (Liu Yao's third empress) (fl. 326), personal name Liu Fang, an empress during the Former Zhao dynasty
- Liu Fang (劉方), a Sui general who conquered northern Vietnam
- Liu Fang (劉放), an official of the Kingdom of Wei

== Locations ==
- Liu Fang, Boon Lay, a subzone in Boon Lay, Singapore
- Liufang Station, a Beijing Subway station in Beijing, China
