= Yan Ding =

General from the Jin Dynasty (died January 313)

- 閻鼎

Chief of Affairs to the Crown Prince (太子詹事)
- In office 312 – c. January 313
- Monarch: Emperor Min of Jin

Personal details
- Born: Unknown
- Died: c.January 313
- Courtesy name: Taichen (臺臣)

Yan Ding (died c. January 313), courtesy name Taichen, was a military general of the Western Jin dynasty. At the time of the Disaster of Yongjia in July 311, Yan Ding brought the nephew of Emperor Huai, Sima Ye, to Chang'an, where a group of loyalists from Anding (安定, present-day Zhenyuan, Gansu) were in the process of retaking the region from Han-Zhao forces. After the re-establishment of the Jin government, Yan Ding became a powerful member of the new regime but jealousy and suspicion would cut his career short as his peers Qu Yun and Suo Chen combined their forces to have him killed.

== Life ==
Yan Ding was from Tianshui Commandery and once served the emperor's regent, Sima Yue as his Army Advisor. He managed to reach the office of Inspector of Yu province later in his career but had to resign due to his mother dying. He wanted to return to the Guanzhong region, and gathered a thousand refugees who wished to follow him at Mi County. Mi County was the base of the provisional government under Xun Fan after Emperor Huai of Jin and the capital, Luoyang fell to the Han-Zhao during the Disaster of Yongjia in July 311. As he commanded a sizeable group, Xun Fan re-appointed Yan Ding the Inspector of Yu Province. The nephew of Emperor Huai, Sima Ye, was also under Xun Fan's care at the time.

Soon, news of Jin's effort to reclaim Chang'an from Han control reached Yan Ding, and he became set on bringing Sima Ye back to his hometown and acclaiming him the new emperor. With encouragement from the Prefect of Heyin (河陰, in modern Luoyang, Henan), Fu Chang (傅暢), he made preparations to depart, but Xun Fan and his peers were reluctant to leave, as they did not want to abandon their homes in the east. Fearing Yan Ding, the group scattered as he sent his troops to chase after them, with most of them managing to escape.

Yan Ding began his journey at Wan, but before he went to Chang'an, he decided to make a stop by Luoyang as he wanted to pay respects to the imperial tombs and recruit more refugees. Many of his followers disapproved of this idea as they believe the Han forces would likely attack them. Yan Ding ignored their concerns and set out with the emperor, but along the way encountered bandits at Shangluo. Hundreds of his followers were killed while some abandoned the group. Regardless, Yan Ding regrouped his remaining forces and proceeded to Lantian. Once there, he sent a message to the Jin leader, Jia Ya announcing his arrival. Jia Ya then brought the emperor and his followers to safety.

Chang'an was recaptured by Jia Ya the following year, and Sima Ye was declared the new Crown Prince. Meanwhile, Yan Ding was made the Chief of Affairs to the Crown Prince, wielding significant power over the new government. Despite that, he was not content with the positions he received and wanted to spread his influence to Jingzhao, which was held by its Administrator, Liang Zong (梁綜). He and Liang battled one another, and Yan Ding killed Liang Zong in the end.

His peers, Qu Yun and Suo Chen felt uncomfortable with Yan Ding's growing power. They banded together, and used Liang Zong's death as a pretext for attacking him. They were joined by Liang Zong's brothers, Liang Wei (梁緯) and Liang Su (梁肅). Yan Ding was driven away and fled to Yong, where he was killed by a Di tribesman named Dou Shou (竇首). With Yan Ding and Liang Zong dead, and Jia Ya losing his life in a skirmish around the same time, Qu Yun and Suo Chen would fill the power vacuum, controlling the emperor until their downfall in 316.
