= Gao Hong (chemist) =

Chinese analytical chemist

Gao Hong (June 26, 1918 – June 14, 2013, Chinese: 高鸿), originally from Jingyang, Shaanxi, was an analytical chemist, educator, and a fellow of the Chinese Academy of Sciences.

== Biography ==
Gao Hong was born on June 6, 1918, in Jingyang, Shaanxi. He attended middle school in Nanjing, Yangzhou, and Xi'an, among other locations. In the spring of 1935, following the completion of middle school in Nanjing, he relocated to Yangzhou and enrolled in the high school preparatory class at Yangzhou Middle School in Jiangsu Province. In 1937, upon the onset of the Second Sino-Japanese War, Gao Hong departed from Yangzhou, returned to his hometown with his family, and completed high school in Xi'an. In 1938, he was enrolled in the chemistry department of the Central University of China (Chinese: 国立中央大学), which had relocated to Chongqing.

In 1943, upon his graduation from the National Central University, Gao Hong remained at the institution as an instructor; by the year's conclusion, he successfully completed the inaugural self-financed examination organized by the Ministry of Education to remain in the United States. In February 1945, with financial backing from Yu Youren and others, he matriculated at the University of Illinois in the United States, focusing on analytical chemistry. In September 1947, Gao Hong graduated from the University of Illinois, obtained a doctorate in Chemistry, and remained at the institution as an assistant professor. In February 1948, due to the altered circumstances in China, Gao Hong discontinued his chemistry studies. In February 1948, in response to developments in China, Gao Hong rescinded his unexpired job contract to return to China and commenced teaching at Central University (now Nanjing University), where the State Council Degrees Committee sanctioned the inaugural cohort of PhD supervisors. In 1962, to engage in the formulation of the national science plan for the advancement of fundamental disciplines. In 1978, to engage in the advancement of fundamental disciplines within the National Science Plan (Chinese: 全国科学规划基础学科). In November 1980, elected as a member of the Academic Department of the Chinese Academy of Sciences. In November 1980, he was elected as a fellow of the Chinese Academy of Sciences.

In 1992, at the age of 74, he volunteered to transfer from Nanjing University to Northwest University. In February 1997, he assumed the role of the inaugural director of the Institute of Analytical Science at Northwestern University. In 1998, he was recognized as one of the inaugural senior academicians of the Chinese Academy of Sciences.

He died on June 14, 2013, at the age of 95 in Nanjing, Jiangsu Province.
