= Jia Ya =

Western Jin dynasty general (died January 313)

- 賈疋

Administrator of Anding (安定太守)
- In office ?–311
- Monarch: Emperor Huai of Jin

Personal details
- Born: Unknown
- Died: c.January 313
- Relations: Jia Xu (great-grandfather)
- Courtesy name: Yandu (彥度)

Jia Ya (Note: In his annotations to vol.87 of Zizhi Tongjian, Hu Sanxing wrote that Jia's name should be pronounced as "Ya" (疋，音雅。).) (died c.January 313), courtesy name Yandu, was a Chinese military general of the Jin dynasty. He was most known for leading the empire's restoration movement against the state of Han-Zhao in Anding (安定, present-day Zhenyuan, Gansu) following the Disaster of Yongjia in 311. However, his untimely death in January 313 undermined the potential of the group, as power would fall into the hands of Suo Chen and Qu Yun, who held on desperately to their influence on Emperor Min of Jin in Chang'an. His name can be rendered as Jia Pi. (Note: Besides his biography in the Tang-era Jin Shu, Jia Ya was also mentioned in Wei Jin Shiyu, which was cited by Pei Songzhi as an annotation to Jia Xu's biography in Sanguozhi, and in part 2 of vol.75 of New Book of Tang.)

== Life ==
Jia Ya was from Wuwei Commandery in modern-day Gansu. His great-grandfather (Note: This is per Wei Jin Shiyu and Jia Ya's biography in Jin Shu. In part 2 of vol.75 of Xin Tang Shu, Jia Xu was indicated as Jia Ya's great-great-grandfather.) was the famed advisor of the warlord Cao Cao, Jia Xu who helped lay the foundation of the state of Cao Wei during the Three Kingdoms. In his youth, he was well-respected by the people for his talents and openness to them. He joined the Jin government, and rose to the rank of Administrator of Anding. (Note: In Zizhi Tongjian, Jia's first few records referred to him by this position.) Jia Ya was also involved in the War of the Eight Princes in 306, in which he sided with Sima Yue against Sima Yong and killed the generals Ma Zhan (馬瞻) and Liang Mai (梁邁).

During the reign of Emperor Huai of Jin in 311, the Inspector of Yongzhou, Ding Chuo (丁綽) slandered Jia Ya to the Prince of Nanyang, Sima Mo (司馬模), a younger brother of Sima Yue. Jia Ya was also hosting the rebel Pei Bao (裴苞), who had opposed Sima Mo. Jia Ya fled to the Lu River, where he befriended the Lushuihu chieftain Peng Dangzhong (彭蕩仲) and the Di chieftain Dou Shou (竇首). Together, they helped Jia Ya return to Anding, where they killed Sima Mo's general Xie Ban (謝班) and forced Ding Chuo to flee to Wudu. The emperor pardoned Jia Ya and appointed him the new Inspector of Yongzhou.

Later that year in July, the forces of Han-Zhao took over Luoyang and captured the emperor as well. Soon, Chang'an also capitulated after Sima Mo was captured and executed by Han. Jia Ya and many of the tribal leaders around Anding sent their officials' children over to Luoyang to submit to Han. However, they did not reach the capital, rather they were led home by Sima Mo's subordinates Suo Chen and Qu Yun, who were fleeing from Han forces. Suo Chen, Qu Yun and the others discussed plans to restore Jin's authority in the north, and they all agreed to have Jia Ya lead them. Jia Ya accepted the position of General Who Pacifies the West.

Jia Ya set out with his army to Chang'an. The Inspector of Yongzhou, Qu Te (麴特), Administrator of Fufeng, Liang Zong (梁綜) and the Administrator of Xinping (新平县, in present-day Henan), Zhu Hui (竺恢) upon hearing Jia Ya's arrival, renounced their submission to Han and joined him. Jia Ya fought Liu Yao at Huangqiu (in present-day Tai'erzhuang District, Shandong), where he greatly routed his army. He then marched to attack his old friend, Peng Dangzhong and killed him. Jia Ya's success convinced many in the Guanxi (關西, west of Hangu Pass) region to surrender to him as well, returning it under Jin control. Not long after, Jia Ya and his group received Yan Ding and the nephew of Emperor Huai, Sima Ye. Jia Ya continued to besiege Chang'an to the following year, finally forcing Liu Yao to retreat.

Sima Ye was proclaimed as the new Crown Prince in Chang'an and Jia Ya was appointed as Grand General Who Conquers The West. However, Jia Ya would not hold onto his new position for long nor would he see the Crown Prince take the throne. Peng Dangzhong's son, Peng Tianhu (彭天護) attacked Jia Ya later in 312. He feigned retreat and Jia Ya chased him into the night. His pursuit proved to be fatal, as he fell into a gully and was captured by Tianhu, who then had him executed. The new regime that Jia Ya had found continued to survive under the guidance of Suo Chen and Qu Yun, but eventually perished in 316 when Sima Ye, posthumously known as Emperor Min of Jin, surrendered to besieging Han forces.
