= Empress Liu (Liu Yao's third empress) =

Empress of China (4th century)

Liu Fang (Chinese: 劉芳) (fl. c. early 4th century CE) was an empress of the Xiongnu-led Han-Zhao dynasty of China. She was Liu Yao's third empress. It was likely that she was ethnically Han, because if she were Xiongnu, Liu Yao would not likely have married her due to the prohibition against endogamy given that they had the same family name.

Liu Fang was the cousin of Liu Yao's second empress, also named Liu. When the older Empress Liu neared her death in 326, she recommended Liu Fang to Liu Yao as his next empress, praising her as beautiful and virtuous. After her death, Liu Yao married Liu Fang and created her empress. Nothing further is said about her in historical records, and it is not known whether she survived to, or survived, Han-Zhao's destruction by the Later Zhao led by Shi Le in 329.

Chinese royalty
Preceded by Empress Liu	Empress of Han-Zhao; 326–329 ?	Dynasty ended
Preceded by Empress Liu	Empress of China (Western); 326–329 ?	Succeeded by Empress Liu of Later Zhao
