= Lushuihu =

Historical ethnic group in Chinese history

The Lushuihu (simplified Chinese: 卢水胡; traditional Chinese: 盧水胡; pinyin: Lúshuǐhú; Wade–Giles: Lu-shui-hu; lit. 'Lu River Barbarians') were an ethnic group that lived in ancient China. They are known for founding the Northern Liang dynasty (397–439 AD) during the Sixteen Kingdoms period. While classified as a branch of the Xiongnu in some historiographies, early records treat the Lushuihu as a separate people. The exact origin of the Lushuihu is still debated by modern scholars, with leading theories linking them to the Lesser Yuezhi people, or that they were a complex multi-ethnic group comprising the Xiongnu, Yuezhi, Qiang and others.

== Origins and theories ==
The word "Hu" (胡) is often translated to English as "barbarian" or "nomad", and was a term used in ancient times to refer to non-Han Chinese people living north or west of the Central Plains. The exact location of the "Lushui" (盧水) or "Lu River" is uncertain due to the wide distribution of the Lushuihu population. There are three locations generally believed to be where the Lu River flowed; Huangzhong in Qinghai, Zhangye in Gansu, or the ancient commanderies of Anding and Beidi in Ningxia.

Modern Chinese scholars have come up with several theories regarding the Lushuihu. Chen Yinke believed that the "Lushuihu" were simply non-Han people named after their place of origin and did not refer to a specific ethnic group. Zhou Yiliang suggested that the Lushuihu were specifically descendants of the Lesser Yuezhi, who once ruled over the Hexi. After their defeat to the Xiongnu empire in the 2nd-century BC, the Lesser Yuezhi were recorded intermingling with the Qiang people in Xiping (西平; around present-day Xining, Qinghai) and Zhangye, which corresponds with the area where the Lushuihu were most active. While Tang Changru agreed with Zhou's view regarding their Yuezhi background, he highlighted that the Lushuihu may have originally been subtribes of the Xiongnu based on the family history of the Juqu clan of Northern Liang. He also added that the ethnic boundary of the Lushuihu was not strictly defined in later periods and that they were a "mixed barbarian" group (雜胡; záhú), with people from the Western Regions even living among them.

== History ==
=== Han dynasty to Sixteen Kingdoms ===
The first appearance of the Lushuihu in official Chinese records was around 57 BC, when they were attacked by the Shaohe Qiang people near modern-day Huangzhong, Qinghai. By 30 AD, they were already vassals of the Han dynasty as evidenced by bamboo inscriptions found in Gansu, likely around the time when the Han official, Dou Rong was governing the Hexi Corridor. They served as auxiliaries for his son, Dou Gu in his campaign against the Northern Xiongnu in 73 AD.

While a subject of the Chinese court, the Lushuihu were known to occasionally rebel. In 77 AD, they joined the Shaodang Qiang leader, Miyu in rebellion, and rebelled again in 86 AD. The Lushuihu later came under the rule of the Cao Wei dynasty. In 222 AD, led by their leaders Zhiyuanduo and Yijiianjiqie, the Lushuihu rebelled in the Hexi Corridor but were defeated by Wei forces. After the Wei was succeeded by the Western Jin dynasty, the Lushuihu colluded with the Xiongnu chief, Hao Duyuan and the Malan Qiang people to rebel in 296 AD, which escalated into Qi Wannian's rebellion and devastated the Guanzhong region.

Apart from the imperial family of the Northern Liang, there were several other recorded Lushuihu leaders during the Sixteen Kingdoms period, namely the Peng clan of Anding Commandery and the Hao clan of Xingcheng (in modern Yan'an, Shaanxi).

=== Northern Liang and Gaochang (397–460) ===
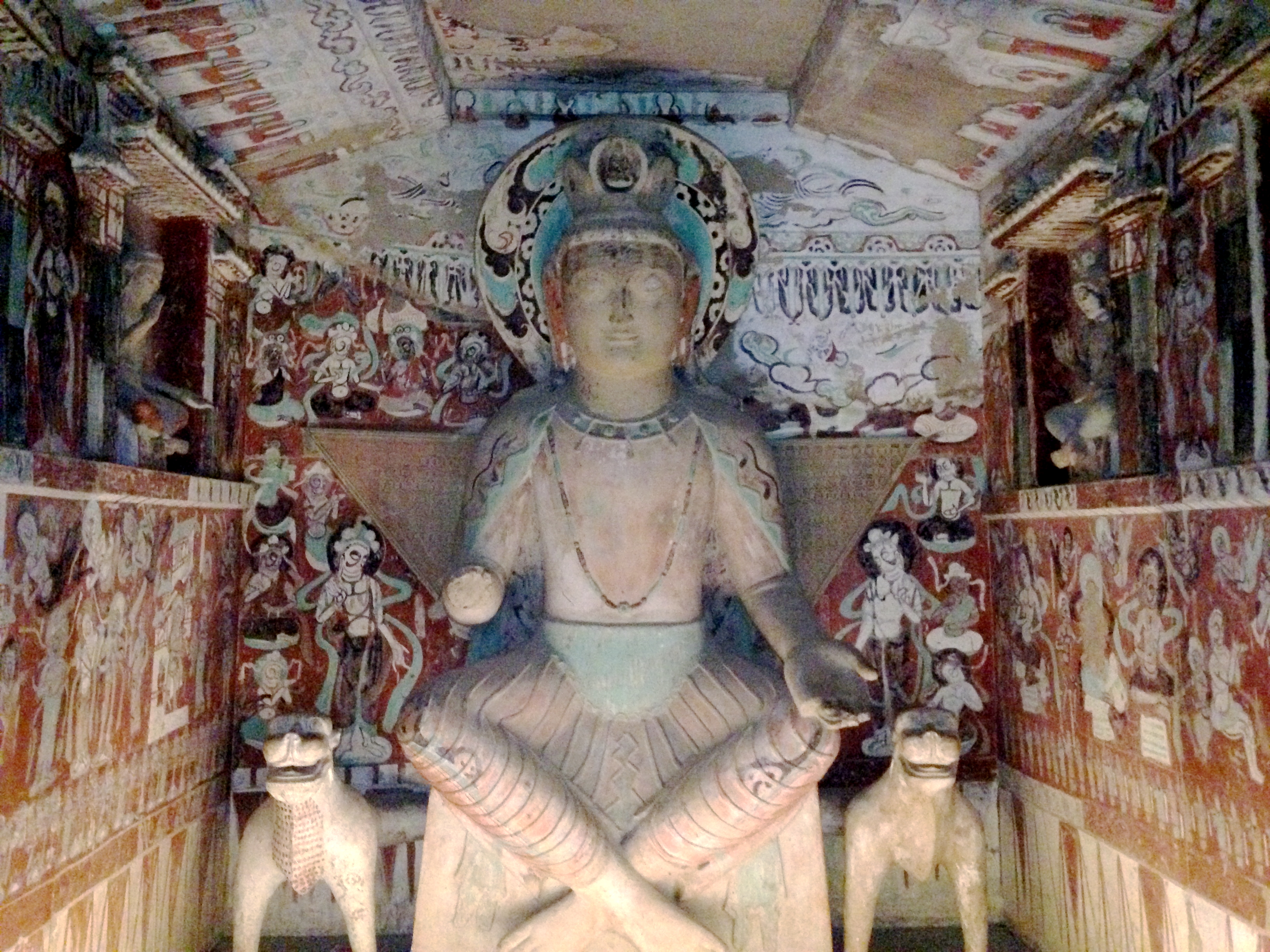
Figure of Maitreya Buddha in cave 275 of the Mogao Caves, built and decorated under the Northern Liang dynasty.

The Juqu clan was a Lushuihu family from Linsong Commandery in modern-day Zhangye, Gansu. Their ancestors once served under the Xiongnu empire holding the title of "Juqu" of the Left (左) of Xiongnu, and so they adopted it as their family name. The Juqu then submitted to the Han dynasty, and centuries later, they entered the service of the Di-led Later Liang dynasty. In 397 AD, after the Liang's disastrous campaign against the Western Qin dynasty, two of their members were falsely accused and executed. The cousins, Juqu Mengxun and Juqu Nancheng, rebelled in response, and they backed the Administrator of Jiankang, Duan Ye, who was Han Chinese, as their leader. While Duan Ye is recognized as the first ruler of the Northern Liang dynasty, the Juqu held considerable power over his reign. In 401, Juqu Mengxun seized the throne after killing Juqu Nancheng and Duan Ye, and the Juqu ruled Northern Liang for the majority of its existence.

The Northern Liang gained full control over the Hexi Corridor after destroying their rival Western Liang in 421. However, as the Northern Wei dynasty encroached on their borders, they submitted as vassals to the Wei and their southern counterpart, the Liu Song dynasty. The Juqu had access to trade with the Western Regions, and they engaged in a cultural exchange with the Song by trading literature. They were ultimately conquered by Wei in 439, but remnants of the Juqu continued to resist before fleeing and occupying the oasis city of Gaochang in 442, where they remained until their destruction to the Rouran Khaganate in 460.

The Juqu had a strong interest in Buddhism, with Juqu Mengxun appointing a monk, Dharmakṣema, as a trusted political advisor and translator of Buddhist literature. It was under them that the first Buddhist cave shrines began appearing in Gansu, the most famous of them being Tiantishan in Wuwei and Wenshushan in Zhangye. The earliest decorated Mogao Caves, caves (268, 272 and 275), were also built and decorated by the Northern Liang between 419 and 439.

=== Gai Wu's Rebellion and decline ===
The last ruler of Northern Liang, Juqu Mujian and 30,000 of his subjects were relocated near the Northern Wei capital, Pingcheng. In the years following the Liang's demise, a series of Lushuihu rebellions broke out in Wei. In 444 AD, Mujian's brother, Juqu Bing plotted a rebellion but was discovered and executed. In 445, a Lushuihu from Xingcheng, Hao Wen revolted and was defeated, but later that year, another Xingcheng Lushuihu, Gai Wu staged an even larger rebellion. With support from the various hu people, Gai Wu's followers reached 100,000 and spread throughout the Guanzhong, lasting until late 446. Buddhist monks in Chang'an were accused of conspiring with Gai Wu, which led to their execution in the first of the Four Buddhist Persecutions in China. Shortly after Gai Wu's defeat in 446, a Lushuihu from Anding, Liu Chao also rebelled but was quickly suppressed.

In 447, the Wei had many members of the Juqu clan, including Juqu Mujian put to death, and by 460, the Juqu in Wei and Gaochang were wiped out. During the reign of Emperor Wencheng of Northern Wei (452–465), more than 800 tribes of the Lushuihu in Xingcheng submitted to Wei. However, during the reign of Emperor Xianwen of Northern Wei (465–471), a rebellion broke out in Xingcheng led by Gai Pingding that was eventually put down. From then on, the Lushuihu ceased to be mentioned in history, as they presumably assimilated into the rest of Chinese society.
