= Jiankang =

Capital city of several Chinese dynasties

Coordinates: 32.05837°N 118.79647°E

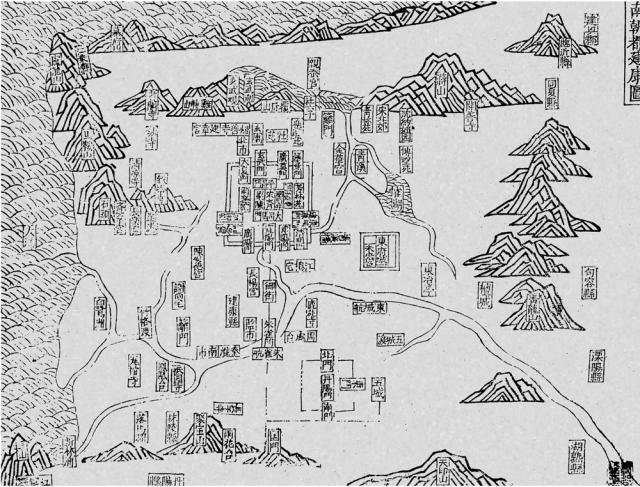
Map of Jiankang as the capital of the Southern Dynasties. Drawing by Chen Yi of the Ming dynasty

Jiankang (Chinese: 建康; pinyin: Jiànkāng), or Jianye (建業; Jiànyè), as it was originally called, was the capital city of the Eastern Wu (229–265 and 266–280 CE), the Eastern Jin dynasty (317–420 CE) and the Southern Dynasties (420–552), including the Chen dynasty (557–589 CE). Its walls are extant as ruins in the modern municipal region of Nanjing. Jiankang was an important city of the Song dynasty. Its name was changed to Nanjing during the Ming dynasty.

== History ==
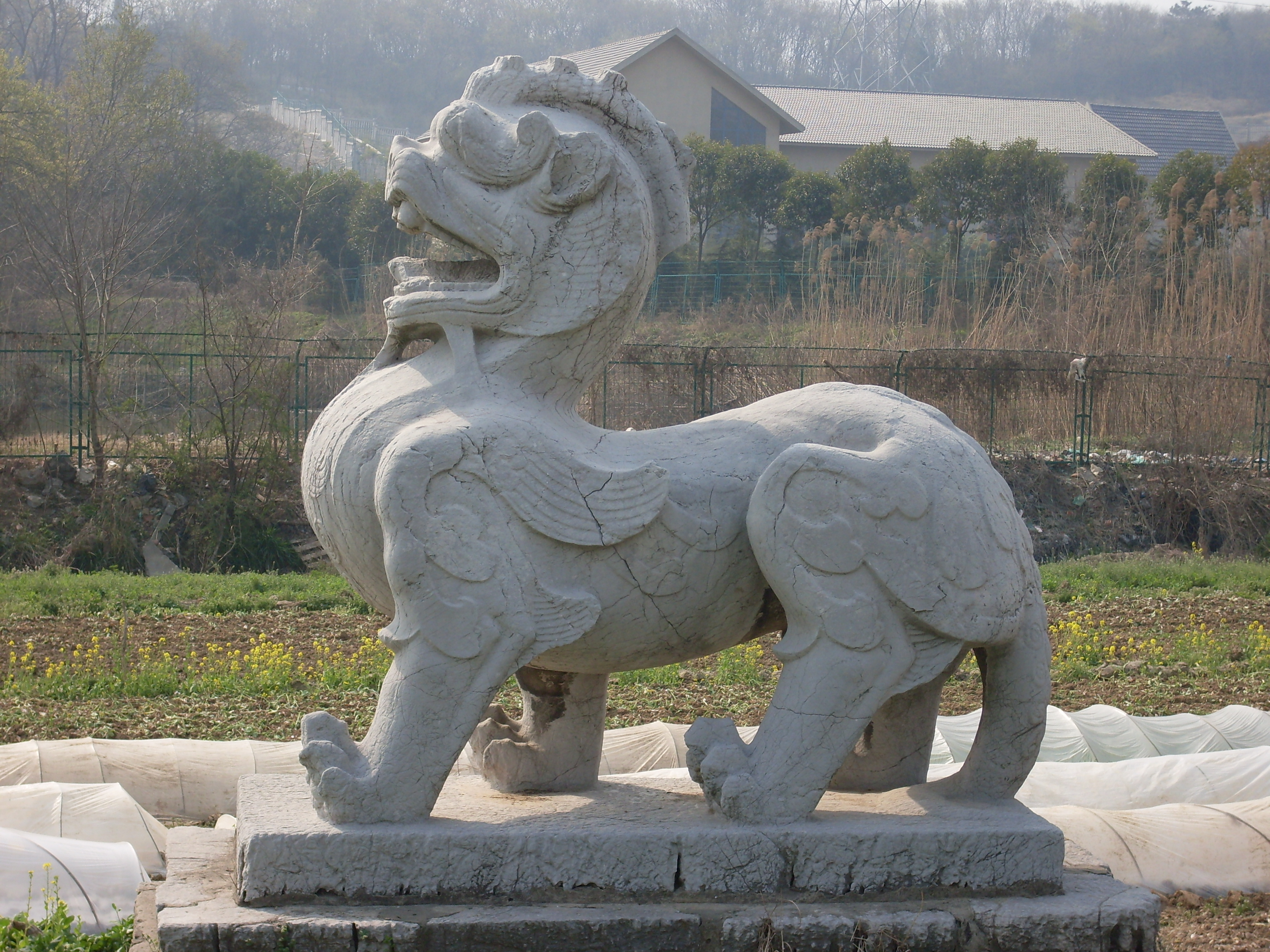
A pixiu from the Yongning Tomb of Emperor Wen of Chen (c. 566). Qixia District

Before the Eastern Jin the city was known as Jianye, and it was the capital of the kingdom of Wu during the Three Kingdoms period. It was renamed Jiankang during the Jin dynasty, in order to observe the naming taboo for Emperor Min of Jin.

Renamed Jiankang in 313 CE, it served as the capital of the Eastern Jin, following the retreat from the north due to Xiongnu raids. Jiankang remained the capital of the Southern Dynasties: Liu Song (420–479), Southern Qi (479–502), Liang (502–557) and Chen (557–589). It rivaled Luoyang in population and commercial activity, and at its height, in the sixth century, it was home to around one million people. In 549 CE, during the rebellion of Hou Jing, Jiankang was captured after a year-long siege that devastated the city: most of the population were killed or starved to death. During the reunification under the Sui dynasty it was almost completely destroyed, and was renamed Jiangzhou (蔣州) and then Danyang Commandery (丹陽郡). Under the Tang dynasty, the city regained its prosperity and the name became Jinling (金陵). Jinling was the capital of the Southern Tang from 937 to 975.

By the end of the Five Dynasties and Ten Kingdoms period it was called Jiangning (江寧); during the Southern Song dynasty the name of Jiankang was revived.

When Zhu Yuanzhang, the Hongwu Emperor, founded the Ming dynasty in 1368, he made Jiankang the capital of China, renaming it Nanjing, "Southern Capital".

=== Six Dynasties ===
The Tang historian Xu Song (許嵩, Xǔ Sōng), in his work Jiankang Shilu (建康實錄, Jiànkāng Shílù), coined the term "Six Dynasties" for the various regimes that had centred their power on the site:

- Eastern Wu (222–280 CE)
- Eastern Jin (317–420 CE)
- Liu Song dynasty (420–479 CE)
- Southern Qi (479–502 CE)
- Liang (502–557 CE)
- Chen (557–589 CE)

In the 6th century, Jiankang may well have been the largest city in the world, with a population of probably more than one million people. At that time, Rome had a population of less than 100,000, Constantinople had about 500,000, and Luoyang had more than 500,000.
