= Anding Commandery =

Historic commandery of China

Anding Commandery (Chinese: 安定郡; lit. 'Peaceful and Stable') was a historical commandery of China, located in what is now eastern Gansu and southern Ningxia.

== History ==
Anding commandery was carved out of Beidi in 114 BC. Its capital was Gaoping (高平, modern Guyuan, Ningxia). In late Western Han period, the commandery administered 21 counties: Gaoping (高平), Fulei (復累), Anbi (安俾), Fuyi (撫夷), Chaona (朝那), Jingyang (涇陽), Linjing (臨涇), Lu (鹵), Wushi (烏氏), Yinmi (陰密), Anding (安定), Candu (參讀), Sanshui (三水), Yinpan (陰槃), Anwu (安武), Zuli (祖厲), Yuande (爰得), Xuanjuan (眴卷), Pengyang (彭陽), Chunyin (鶉陰) and Yuezhidao (月支道). The total population in 2 AD was 143,294 (42,725 households). The Eastern Han census in 140 AD, however, documented a population of only 29,060 (6,094 households), and the number of counties had reduced to 8.

Due to attacks by the Qiang people, the commandery's administration was relocated to Youfufeng from 111 to 129. Anding was moved permanently to Youfufeng in 141 after another wave of Qiang attacks, and the original territories were eventually abandoned. In 280 AD, the commandery had 7 counties, with a total population of 5,500 households.
