= Sima Bao =

Western Jin imperial prince (294–320)

Sima Bao 司馬保
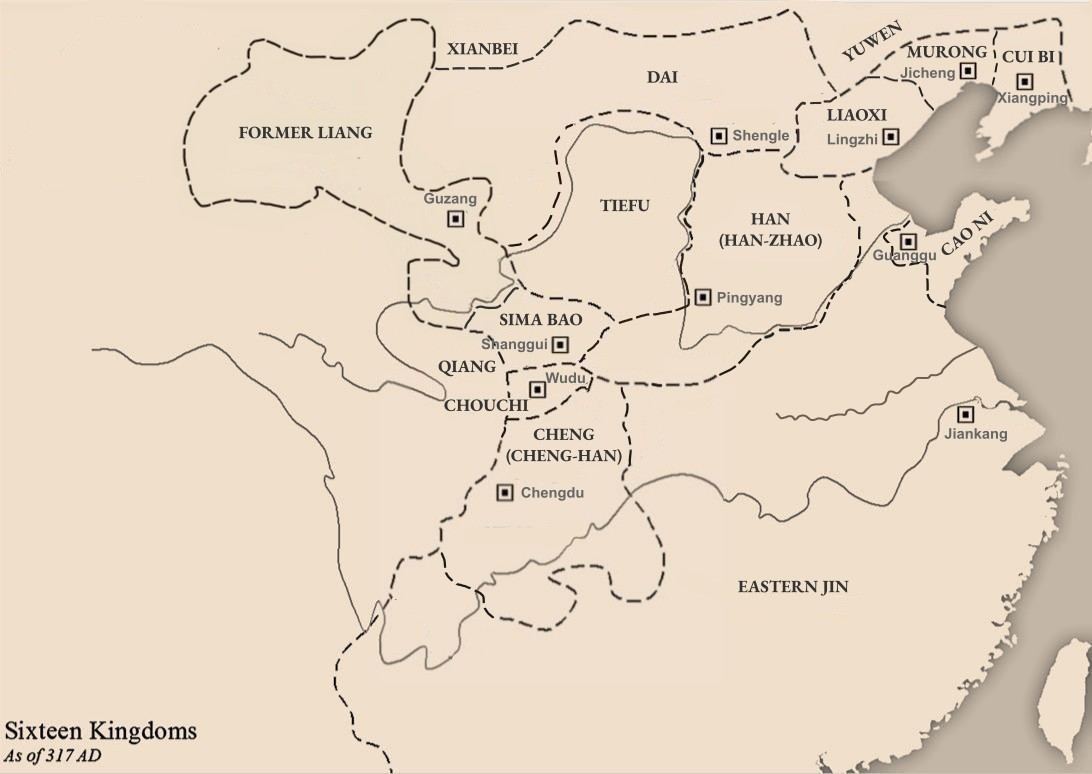
- Sima Bao's territory as of 317 AD

Prince of Jin (晉王)
- Reign: 319 – c.July 320

Chancellor of State (相國)
- In office 315 – 319
- Monarch: Emperor Min of Jin

Personal details
- Born: 294
- Died: c.July 320
- Parent: Sima Mo (father)
- Courtesy name: Jingdu (景度)
- Peerage: Prince of Nanyang (南陽王)
- Posthumous name: Prince Yuan (元王)

Sima Bao (司馬保; 294 – c.July 320), courtesy name Jingdu (景度), posthumous name Prince Yuan (元王), was a Western Jin imperial prince who briefly contended for the position of emperor after Emperor Min was captured by Han-Zhao forces.

== Life ==
Sima Bao's father Sima Mo (司馬模) the Prince of Nanyang was a younger brother of Sima Yue the Prince of Donghai, who was regent for Emperor Hui and Emperor Huai. Both Sima Mo and Sima Yue were sons of Sima Tai (司馬泰), Prince Wenxian of Gaomi, a son of Sima Yi's brother Sima Kui (司馬馗). In c.October 311, after Emperor Huai was captured by Han after the fall of the capital Luoyang in July (Disaster of Yongjia), Sima Mo, who was defending Chang'an, was captured by the Han general Zhao Ran (趙染; who formerly served under Sima Mo), and executed by Liu Can.

At the time of his father's death, Sima Bao was at Shanggui (上邽, in modern Tianshui, Gansu). He took the title of Prince of Nanyang, and soon became in control of Qin Province (秦州, modern eastern Gansu), partly due to the death of Jia Ya in c.January 313. He was known for his generosity and openness, and the people of the province, whether Han, Di, or Qiang, were said to be open to his leadership. He was also grossly overweight—according to historians, he self-declared that his weight was at 800 Chinese pounds (jin, 斤) -- or roughly 400 kilograms (880 pounds). He was also said to be impotent, and therefore had no children. He entered into an alliance with Zhang Gui (張軌), the governor of Liang Province (涼州, modern central and western Gansu), and Zhang's domain, largely untouched by wars, often supplied Sima Bao's.

After Emperor Min assumed the throne in June 313, Sima Bao, whose troops were still sizable, was given the title of right prime minister (右丞相), but while he took occasional campaigns to relieve Emperor Min's government, then at Chang'an, from pressures being applied by Han forces, he took no actual actions to put Emperor Min under his protection. Indeed, in 316, when his generals briefly defeated Han forces seeking to siege Chang'an, they stopped short of reaching Chang'an, which was then captured by Han forces, causing Emperor Min to be captured.

Sima Bao then considered taking the imperial title for himself. In 319, he stopped short of that goal, by declaring himself the Prince of Jin, the same title that the founding emperor Emperor Wu's father Sima Zhao had taken during his stint as Cao Wei's regent. He believed that Zhang Gui's son and successor Zhang Shi (張寔) would support him, but Zhang decided not to commit, believing that Sima Rui the Prince of Langye, who had claimed the imperial title in 318 after Emperor Min had been executed by Han, might be the more appropriate emperor. In early 320, when the Former Zhao (renamed from the Han in 319) emperor Liu Yao decided to undertake a major campaign to wipe out Sima Bao, Sima Bao's domain happened to be suffering under a famine, and he fled to Sangcheng (桑城, in modern Dingxi, Gansu), ready to flee to Zhang's domain. Zhang sent a force that ostensibly was to protect Sima Bao, but instead was intended to stop him from arriving in Zhang's domain.

Later that year, Sima Bao's generals Zhang Chun (張春) and Yang Ci (楊次) tried to persuade him to execute another general of his, Yang Tao (楊韜) and also to attack a former subordinate, Chen An, who had surrendered to Former Zhao, but who had continued to covertly supply Sima Bao. Sima Bao did not agree with them. Soon, he died—with some historians believing that he was murdered by Zhang and Yang Ci, while some historians believed he died of natural causes. Zhang and Yang Ci, because Sima Bao was sonless, supported a male member of the Sima clan, Sima Zhan (司馬瞻) to be Sima Bao's heir. Chen, still bearing some loyalty to Sima Bao and believing that he had been murdered, attacked and killed Sima Zhan. Zhang fled, but Yang Ci was captured, and Chen executed him before Sima Bao's casket, and then buried Sima Bao with honors due an emperor and gave him the posthumous name of Prince Yuan.
