= Liu Yao =

Emperor of Han-Zhao from 318 to 329

Liu Yao 劉曜

Emperor of Han-Zhao
- Reign: 318–329
- Predecessor: Jin Zhun
- Successor: Liu Xi (not enthroned)
- Born: Unknown
- Died: between February and September 329
- Spouse: Empress Yuandao; Yang Xianrong; Empress Liu; Liu Fang; Consort Jin
- Issue: see #Personal information
Names
- Family name: Liu (劉); Given name: Yao (曜); Courtesy name: Yongming (永明)
Era name and dates
- Guāngchū (光初): 318–329
- House: Liu
- Dynasty: Han-Zhao
- Father: Liu Lü
- Mother: Lady Hu

Liu Yao (died 329), courtesy name Yongming, was the final emperor of the Xiongnu-led Han-Zhao dynasty of China. He became emperor in 318 after most other members of the imperial Liu clan were massacred by Jin Zhun in a coup. However, the empire was soon divided in half, as the general Shi Le declared independence and established the Later Zhao dynasty. In a decisive battle in early 329, Shi captured and executed him, and while his sons Liu Xi the Crown Prince and Liu Yin the Prince of Nanyang continued to hold out for nearly a year, the Han-Zhao state fell later that year.

== Early life ==
Liu Yao's father Liu Lü (劉綠) died early, and he was raised by Liu Lü's cousin Liu Yuan. When he was young, Liu Yuan became impressed with his intelligence and strength. As he grew, he became known for his archery skills and his studiousness—although his studies were described to be surveys rather than careful readings, except for books on military strategy, which he spent much of his time on. He often deprecated Wu Han and Deng Yu, instead comparing himself to the great Warring States general Le Yi, the great Han dynasty prime minister Xiao He, and the Han general and official Cao Can (曹參). When people heard these remarks, they often criticized him for being overly arrogant, but Liu Yuan's son Liu Cong respected him and remarked, "Yongming should be compared to Shizu (the temple name of Emperor Guangwu of Han) and Emperor Wu of Wei (Cao Cao); Le, Xiao, and Cao Can cannot be compared to him."

When Liu Yao was young, he, along with his cousin Liu Cong, were studying in the Jin capital Luoyang, when on one occasion he committed an unspecified crime punishable by death. He therefore fled to Chaoxian (朝鮮, near modern Pyeongyang, North Korea—not, in this case, a generic geographic term for Korea). Later, after a general pardon, he returned, but decided to live in the mountains away from trouble.

== During Liu Yuan's reign ==
After Liu Yuan declared himself the Prince of Han in 304, creating the Han state and effectively declaring independence and war on (Western) Jin, he made Liu Yao a major general. Liu Yao was probably created the Prince of Shi'an in 306, when Liu Yuan declared himself the emperor. During Liu Yuan's reign, Liu Yao engaged in many campaigns against Jin forces and often was victorious, although he, like other Han generals, had difficulty permanently holding cities that he captured. In 309, along with his cousin Liu Cong and Wang Mi, he attacked Luoyang, but was repelled.

== During Liu Cong's and Liu Can's reigns ==
After Liu Yuan's death in 310, Liu Cong overthrew his older brother and Liu Yuan's successor Liu He (after Liu He had tried to have him and the other brothers killed and successfully killed two) and succeeded to the throne himself as Emperor Zhaowu. He trusted Liu Yao greatly and commissioned him with a large force, and Liu Yao served his cousin faithfully.

In 311, Liu Yao, in conjunction with Wang, Shi Le, and Huyan Yan, captured Luoyang and Emperor Huai of Jin. He took Emperor Huai's sister-in-law, the deceased Emperor Hui's wife, Yang Xianrong, as his own wife.

Later that year, after Liu Cong's son Liu Can captured Chang'an, Liu Yao was put in charge of the Chang'an region, although he subsequently lost that city to Jin forces under Qu Yun (麴允), allowing the Jin prince Sima Ye (Emperor Huai's nephew) to occupy that city and subsequently declare himself emperor (as Emperor Min of Jin) in 313 after Liu Cong executed the former Jin emperor. In 312, while fighting Liu Kun the Jin governor of Bing Province (并州, modern central and northern Shanxi) and his ally Tuoba Yilu the Duke of Dai in conjunction with Liu Can, Liu Yao suffered a serious injury and was almost captured or killed by Jin forces, but was able to escape after the general Fu Hu (傅虎) yielded his own horse and sacrificed his own life in doing so.

For the next few years, Liu Yao fought largely inconclusive battles against Jin forces, both those directly under Emperor Min and those under Sima Bao the Prince of Nanyang. However, in 316, after Emperor Min's forces collapsed and Sima Bao failed to come to his aid, Liu Yao captured Chang'an and Emperor Min (whom Liu Cong subsequently executed in 318). For this accomplishment, Liu Cong created him the greater title of Prince of Qin.

Late in Liu Cong's reign, Liu Cong grew increasingly cruel and extravagant, as well as increasingly trusting eunuchs and the treacherous official Jin Zhun. In 318, as Liu Cong grew ill, he summoned Liu Yao and Shi Le to be regents for his son Liu Can, but both Liu Yao and Shi declined, perhaps not wishing to contest the authorities of Jin Zhun, whose daughters had sway with Liu Cong and Liu Can as their wives. Subsequently, when Liu Cong died later that year and Liu Can succeeded to the throne, Jin Zhun became powerful and overthrew Liu Can, slaughtering all members of the imperial Liu clan in the capital Pingyang (平陽, in modern Linfen, Shanxi). In the massacre, Liu Yao lost his mother Lady Hu, brother, and (he thought at the time) his son and heir Liu Yin. (However, unknown to his father, Liu Yin fled but was captured by or sold to a tribe named Heiniyuju (黑匿郁鞠) as a slave.)

Upon hearing news of Jin Zhun's coup, Liu Yao and Shi each led their armies against Jin, catching him trapped between their forces. Meanwhile, senior Han princes and officials who escaped the Pingyang massacre offered the throne to Liu Yao, who accepted. He offered to not only spare Jin Zhun's life but continue to grant him power if Jin would surrender. However, when Jin Zhun was subsequently assassinated and succeeded by his cousin Jin Ming (靳明), who then surrendered to Liu Yao, Liu Yao massacred the Jin clan. As Pingyang was in ruins after the coup and the subsequent war, Liu Yao moved the capital to Chang'an.

== Early reign ==
As emperor, Liu Yao showed flashes of brilliance, both at governance and military matters, at times, as well as willingness to listen to contrary opinions. However, he was also often impulsive and quick to anger, and toward the end of his reign appeared to develop alcoholism, which impaired his judgment.

His first sign of impulsiveness might have contributed to the formal division of Han into two. In 319, when Shi Le sent messengers to offer tribute to Liu Yao, Liu Yao was initially very happy, as Shi was effectively the master of the eastern half of the empire and his submission therefore showed that his throne was secure. He created Shi the Prince of Zhao and granted him a number of imperial privileges. However, when one junior member of Shi's delegation, who wished to stay in Chang'an, thereafter submitted a report that Shi was in fact plotting an attack, Liu became angry and slaughtered Shi's delegation. When Shi received the news, he became angry and was resolved to declare himself independent of Han.

Later in 319, Liu Yao created Princess Yang—the former Jin empress—empress, making her the only person in Chinese history to serve as empress for two emperors and two empires. He created her son Liu Xi crown prince. He also changed the name of the state from Han to Zhao. Liu Yuan had declared the empire's name Han to create a linkage with the Han dynasty—to which he claimed he was a descendant, through a princess, but Liu Yao felt that it was time to end the linkage with Han and explicitly restore the linkage to the great Xiongnu chanyu Maodun, and therefore decided to change the name of the state. However, this was not a break from Liu Yuan, as he continued to honor Liu Yuan and Liu Cong posthumously. In winter 319, Shi declared himself the Prince of Zhao, thus establishing his own state of Zhao. Historiographers distinguish the two states by referring to Liu Yao's state as Former Zhao and Shi Le's state as Later Zhao.

Liu Yao's impulsiveness led to a major Di and Qiang rebellion in 320. After a conspiracy involving two Di chiefs, Ju Xu (句徐) and Ku Peng (庫彭) was discovered, Liu Yao executed not only Ju and Ku but also 50 other Di chiefs, throwing their bodies into the Wei River. When his official You Ziyuan (游子遠) tried to persuaded him against these actions, he threw You into jail. Aggravated, Di and Qiang tribes declared independence in a state named Qin (秦). Subsequently, he released You and commissioned You with a force to suppression the rebellion, and You was able to persuade most of the rebels to surrender and defeat the rest.

In 322, while on a campaign against the Di chief of Chouchi, Yang Nandi, Liu Yao was stricken by a communicable disease, and while he was still able to force Yang to submit, his general Chen An, a former subordinate of Sima Bao, mistakenly thought that Liu Yao had already died, and therefore declared independence as the Prince of Liang, controlling most of Qin Province (秦州, modern eastern Gansu). In 323, Liu Yao, having recovered, personally attacked Chen's headquarters at Shanggui (上邽, in modern Tianshui, Gansu). Chen fled but was eventually captured and killed. Qin Province was once again Former Zhao domain.

After his victory over Chen, Liu Yao continued west and attacked the Jin vassal Former Liang, crushing all bases that Former Liang had east of the Yellow River. He declared that he would next cross the Yellow River and head for the Former Liang capital Guzang (姑臧, in modern Wuwei, Gansu), but instead was intending to intimidate the Former Liang leader Zhang Mao (then carrying the Jin-created title Duke of Xiping) into submission. Zhang was indeed intimidated and submitted to Former Zhao suzerainty. Liu Yao created him the Prince of Liang.

Later that year, Liu Yao's son Liu Yin, who had been a slave with the Heiniyuju tribe, because Chen had been defeated, revealed his identity to the chief, who was surprised and respectfully delivered Liu Yin back to Liu Yao. (It is not clear where Heiniyuju was or why Liu Yin waited until Chen's defeat to reveal his identity to the chief; it could have been that Heiniyuju was initially a Chen ally, and while Chen was, prior to his rebellion, nominally a Former Zhao general, Liu Yin might have been concerned about being detained by Chen as a bargaining chip.) Liu Yao considered making Liu Yin his crown prince instead (since Liu Yin had previously been his heir), but, not having the heart to depose Liu Xi, the son of Empress Yang (who died earlier that year), and particularly because Liu Yin personally declined and did not wish to replace his brother, Liu Yao left Liu Xi as crown prince and created Liu Yin the Prince of Yong'an with special honors.

== Late reign ==
In 324, the first real battle between Later Zhao and Former Zhao occurred at Xin'an (新安, in modern Luoyang, Henan), ushering an era in which Later Zhao and Former Zhao would continuously battle for years. In 325, their armies fought a major battle near Luoyang (which the two, as well as Jin, had fought over for months), and after some initial Former Zhao successes, Later Zhao's general Shi Hu decisively defeated and captured Former Zhao's general Liu Yue (劉岳), after Liu Yao himself encountered difficulties with his army discipline and could not come to Liu Yue's aid. Later Zhao took this opportunity to effectively take the modern central Henan, northern Jiangsu, and western Shandong under its control.

Later in 325, Liu Yao created Liu Yin the Prince of Nanyang and further bestowed on him the title of Grand Chanyu, putting Wu Hu tribal forces under his command. He also created a second empress, Empress Liu.

In 326, Empress Liu died, and according to her wishes, Liu Yao married her cousin Liu Fang as empress.

In 327, believing that Former Zhao had been weakened by its defeat at Later Zhao's hands, Zhang Jun, Zhang Mao's nephew and successor as the head of Former Liang, declared himself again a Jin vassal and pillaged Former Zhao's Qin Province. Liu Yin led an army and defeated Former Liang's forces, even crossing the Yellow River, but eventually settling for capturing Former Liang's remaining territory east of the Yellow River.

In fall 328, Shi Hu attacked Former Zhao's Hedong Commandery (roughly modern Yuncheng, Shanxi). Liu Yao personally led an army and defeated Shi Hu, and then headed south and surrounded Luoyang, capturing several commanderies around it. This greatly shocked Shi Le, as he was worried that Liu Yao would next attack his capital Xiangguo (襄國, in modern Xintai, Hebei). In winter 328, Shi Le personally led a relief force to Luoyang. Meanwhile, during the siege of Luoyang, Liu Yao took no precautious to cut off Chenggao Pass (in modern Zhengzhou, Henan), and Shi was able to pass through it and arrive at Luoyang. In connection with this war by Shi Le against Liu Yao in 328 CE was uttered the only phrase in the Jie language which has survived to modern times, recorded phonetically in the Chinese annals, glossed with a Chinese translation. The phrase has since been analyzed and translated in numerous publications.

Around the new year 329, the armies engaged in battle. Before the battle, Liu Yao, who had taken to drinking in his late reign, drank a large amount of liquor. His usual horse had suffered leg spasms, and so he had to ride a smaller horse, and during battle Shi made a surprise attack, and the horse, unable to bear his weight, fell, and he was thrown off the horse. Later Zhao soldiers inflicted many wounds on him before capturing him and taking them to the general Shi Kan (石堪). Shi Le then ordered his army to stop engagement and allow the Former Zhao forces to retreat.

Shi Kan delivered Liu Yao to Shi Le. Shi ordered that Liu's wounds be treated, and he then took Liu Yao to Xiangguo. He put Liu Yao under heavy guard but supplied him with women, and also permitted his previously captured generals Liu Yue and Liu Zhen (劉震) to visit him. Shi then ordered Liu Yao to write a letter to Liu Xi and Liu Yin, ordering them to surrender. Instead, Liu Yao wrote a letter that stated: "Protect the empire with your officials. Do not care about me." Shi saw the letter and grew angry, and eventually executed Liu Yao. Late in 329, Shi Hu would capture and execute Liu Xi and Liu Yin, ending the Han-Zhao dynasty.

== Physical Appearance ==
In the Book of Jin, Liu Yao was described as a tall man (approximately 2.28 metres) and that he had greyish eyebrows and a sparse long beard.

== Personal information ==
- Father
  - Liu Lü (劉綠), posthumously honored as Emperor Xuancheng
- Mother
  - Lady Hu (killed by Jin Zhun 318), posthumously honored as Empress Dowager Xuanming
- Wives
  - Princess Bu, mother of Prince Yin, posthumously honored as Empress Yuandao
  - Yang Xianrong, mother of Princes Xī, Xí, and Chan (created empress in 319, d. 322)
  - Empress Liu (Liu Yao's second empress) (created 325, d. 326)
  - Liu Fang (created empress in 326)
- Major Concubines
  - Consort Jin, daughter of Jin Kang (靳康) the cousin of Jin Zhun
- Children
  - Liu Jian (劉儉), the Prince of Linhai
  - Liu Yin (劉胤), initially the Heir Apparent to Prince of Qin, later the Prince of Yong'an (created 323), later the Prince of Nanyang (created 325, killed by Later Zhao 329)
  - Liu Xī (劉熙, note different tone than his brother), the Crown Prince (created 319, killed by Later Zhao 329)
  - Liu Xí (劉襲, note different tone than his brother), the Prince of Changle (created 319)
  - Liu Chan (劉闡), the Prince of Taiyuan (created 319)
  - Liu Chong (劉沖), the Prince of Huai'nan (created 319)
  - Liu Chang (劉敞), the Prince of Qi (created 319)
  - Liu Gao (劉高), the Prince of Lu (created 319)
  - Liu Hui (劉徽), the Prince of Chu (created 319)
  - A daughter who later became Later Zhao emperor Shi Hu's empress (b. 318)

Lord Hou of (Han) Zhao House of Liu Died: 329
Regnal titles
Preceded by Liu Can	Emperor of Han-Zhao; 318–329	Succeeded by Liu Xi as Prince of Han-Zhao
Titles in pretence
Preceded by Liu Can	— TITULAR — Emperor of China; Royal descent claimant 318–329; Reason for succession failure: Sixteen Kingdoms	Succeeded by Liu Xi
