= Jingzhao =

Historical region centered on the Chang'an, China

Jingzhao 京兆
- Historical region / Commandery
- Country: China
- Founded: 104 BC
- Seat: Chang'an
- Modern name: Xi'an, Shaanxi, China

Jingzhao (Chinese: 京兆) was a historical region centered on the ancient Chinese capital of Chang'an.

== Han dynasty ==
In early Han dynasty, the governor of the capital Chang'an and its vicinities was known as You Neishi (右內史), and the region was also known by the same name. In 104 BC, the eastern half of You Neishi was changed to Jingzhao Yin (京兆尹, "Intendant of the Capital"), while the western half became You Fufeng. The region included 12 counties: Chang'an (長安), Xinfeng (新豐), Chuansikong (船司空), Lantian (藍田), Huayin (華陰), Zheng (鄭), Hu (湖), Xiagui (下邽), Nanling (南陵), Fengming (奉明), Baling (霸陵) and Duling (杜陵). In 2 AD, the population was 682,468, in 195,702 households. By the end of the Han dynasty, Nanling, Fengming and Chuansikong counties were abolished and Hu and Huayin became part of Hongnong Commandery, while 5 new counties – Changling (長陵), Yangling (陽陵), Shangluo (上雒), Shang (商縣), and Yinpan (陰盤) – were added from other commanderies.

== Cao Wei to Sui dynasty ==
In the Cao Wei dynasty, Jingzhao became a regular commandery, and it governor was known as "grand administrator" (太守). In 583, the commandery was abolished. In 607, however, the commandery system was restored and Yong Prefecture (雍州) was renamed Jingzhao Commandery.

== Tang dynasty and after ==
In Tang dynasty, Jingzhao was a superior prefecture (府) created in 713 AD by converting Yong Prefecture (雍州). It lay north of the Qin Mountains in Shaanxi with Chang'an as its core. A census taken in 742 AD reported a total of 362,921 households (population: 1,960,188), while a census taken ca. 813 AD reported only 241,202 households.

Chang'an was destroyed during the fall of Tang dynasty. However, the name "Jingzhao" was restored in the Later Tang dynasty. In Song dynasty, the prefecture administered 13 counties: Chang'an (長安), Fanchuan (樊川), Hu (鄠), Lantian (藍田), Xianyang (咸陽), Jingyang (涇陽), Yueyang (櫟陽), Gaoyang (高陽), Xingping (興平), Lintong (臨潼), Liquan (醴泉), Wugong (武功), and Qianyou (乾祐). The name was used until Yuan dynasty when the prefecture became Anxi Circuit (安西路) and later Fengyuan Circuit (奉元路). In Ming dynasty, it adopted the current name Xi'an.
