= Emperor Min of Jin =

Emperor of the Jin Dynasty from 313 to 318

Emperor Min of Jin 晉愍帝
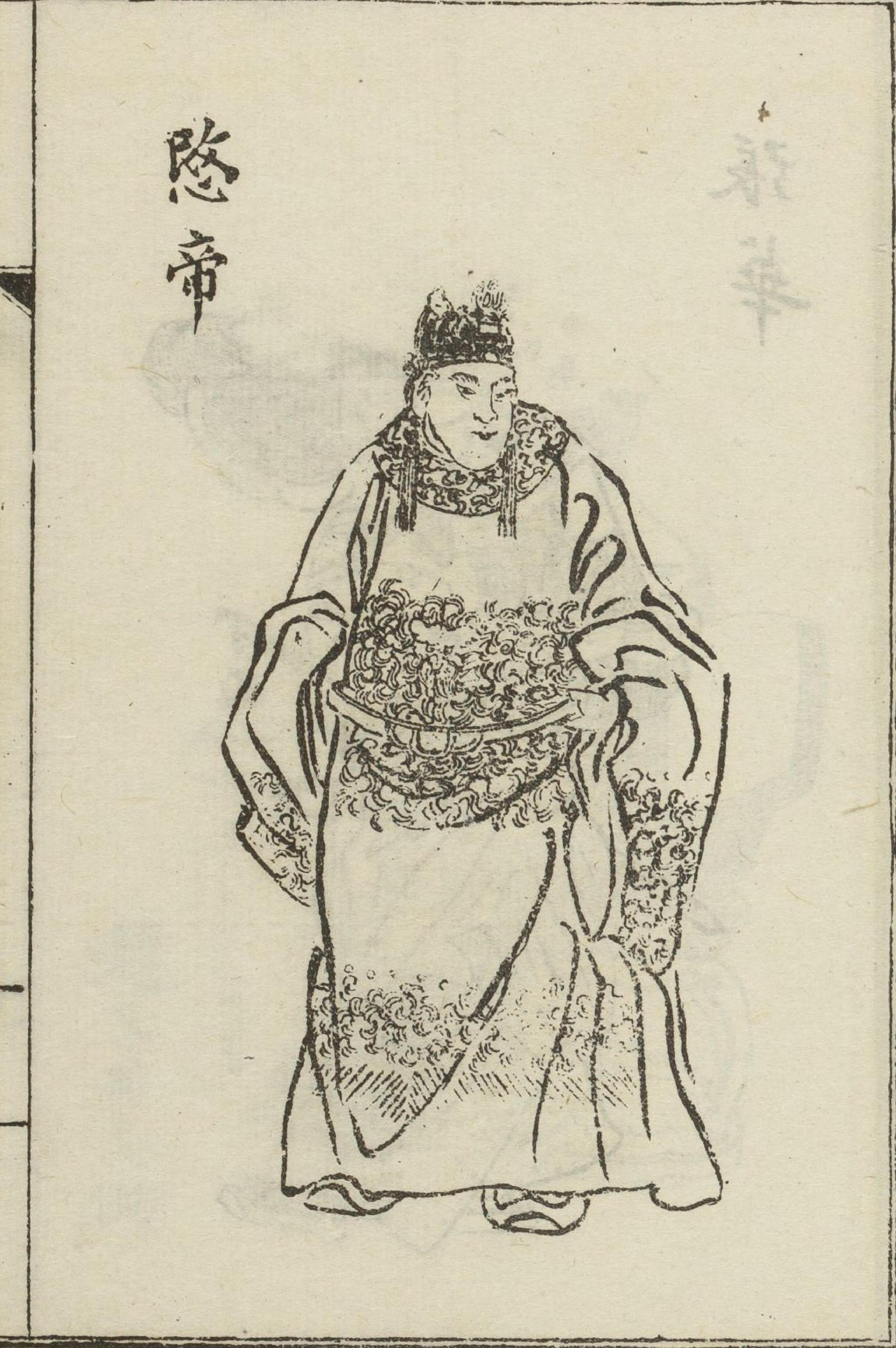

Emperor of the Jin Dynasty
- Reign: 7 June 313 – 7 February 318
- Predecessor: Emperor Huai of Jin
- Successor: Emperor Yuan of Jin

Crown Prince of the Jin Dynasty
- Tenure: 19 October 312 – 7 June 313
- Predecessor: Sima Quan (Note: Sima Quan was crown prince during much of Sima Chi's reign, but was killed during the Disaster of Yongjia.)
- Successor: Sima Shao
- Born: 300
- Died: 7 February 318 (aged 17–18)
Names
- Family name: Sima (司馬; sī mǎ); Given name: Ye (鄴 or 業, yè)
Posthumous name
- Full: Xiaomin (孝愍, xiào mǐn) literary meaning "filial and suffering" Short: Min (愍, mǐn) literary meaning "suffering"
- Father: Sima Yan
- Mother: Lady Xun

Emperor Min of Jin (simplified Chinese: 晋愍帝; traditional Chinese: 晉愍帝; pinyin: Jìn Mǐn Dì; Wade–Giles: Chin Min-ti; 300 – February 7, 318), personal name Sima Ye (司馬鄴 or 司馬業), courtesy name Yanqi (彥旗), was an emperor of the Jin dynasty and the last of the Western Jin.

Emperor Min surrendered in 316 to Liu Yao, a general of the Xiongnu state Han-Zhao, and was later executed by Liu Cong, the emperor of Han, in 318 – like his uncle Emperor Huai had been in 313.

== Prior to becoming emperor ==
Sima Ye was a son of Sima Yan (司馬晏), Prince Xiao of Wu, a son of Jin's founding emperor Emperor Wu, and Lady Xun, a daughter of Xun Xu. However, he was made the heir of his uncle Sima Jian (司馬柬) the Prince of Qin (and the only full brother of Emperor Hui to live to adulthood), who died on 23 October 291, about nine years before his birth; Sima Ye inherited the title of Prince of Qin from Jian's immediate successor, who was killed by Sima Lun. (Note: Sima Jian's immediate heir was Sima Yu (司马郁), son of Sima Yun, Prince of Huainan; Yun was also a full brother of Ye's father. However, both Sima Yun and Sima Yu were killed in Yun's failed rebellion against Sima Lun in c.September 300 (8th month of the 1st year of the Yong'kang era, per vol.04 of Jin Shu; the month corresponds to 31 Aug to 29 Sep 300 in the Julian calendar).)

The years following Sima Ye's birth saw an increase in the intensity of the struggle among the Jin imperial princes to become Emperor Hui's regent (War of the Eight Princes). By the time Sima Ye was seven, Emperor Hui had died, Sima Yue continued to be regent under Emperor Huai's nominal rule and Jin imperial authority had been greatly weakened.

When the Jin capital Luoyang fell to Han-Zhao forces on 13 July 311, (Note: The annals of Emperor Huai in Book of Jin recorded that Liu Yao and Wang Mi entered the capital Luoyang on the ding'you day of the 6th month of the 5th year of the Yong'jia era.) Prince Ye's uncle Emperor Huai was captured; his father Prince Yan and eldest brother (whose name was unrecorded), as well as his cousin Sima Quan the crown prince, were killed. Prince Ye himself, at age 11, was able to escape from Han forces, and he got to Mi (密縣, in modern Zhengzhou, Henan) when he encountered his uncles, the Jin officials Xun Fan and Xun Zu, who decided to support him as their leader. Later that year, the general Yan Ding tried to escort Prince Ye into the Guanzhong region (modern central Shaanxi), where he thought the central government could be rebuilt, but on the way, most of the supporters and troops deserted them—including Prince Ye's uncles. Eventually, however, Yan and Prince Ye were able to arrive in Guanzhong. They were supported by the general Jia Ya, and Jia was able to capture Chang'an in 312, allowing Prince Ye to enter and set up his headquarters there. On 19 October 312, Jia and Yan offered Prince Ye the title of crown prince, and they then organized a provisional government.

== Reign ==
In spring 313, the captured Emperor Huai was executed by the Han emperor Liu Cong. The news, however, took three months to get to Chang'an. Once it did, Crown Prince Ye held an official mourning for his uncle and then ascended the throne as emperor. (Note: Due to his ascension, Sima Rui, who was then stationed at Jianye (present day Nanjing), changed the name of the city to "Jiankang".) At that time, the city of Chang'an was so poor that it had less than a hundred households, and there were only four wagons available. The officials lacked official uniforms and seals. The military matters were largely entrusted to the generals Qu Yun and Suo Chen. Emperor Min issued an edict ordering Sima Bao, the Prince of Nanyang, who still had a sizable force in Qin Province (秦州, modern eastern Gansu), and Sima Rui, the Prince of Langya, who held large portions of territory near and south of the Yangtze River, to come to his aid, but both Sima Bao and Sima Rui only paid nominal allegiance to him and failed to actually provide any assistance. Around the new year of 314, Han made a surprise attack on Chang'an, and while that attack was thwarted that time, it showed that the Jin regime under Emperor Min lacked the power to defend itself. Only Zhang Gui, the governor of Liang Province (涼州, modern central and western Gansu), sent small detachments and supplies periodically to Chang'an. In 315, Sima Bao considered coming to Emperor Min's aid, but ultimately did not do so, and Suo subsequently refused a plan to send the emperor to Sima Bao, reasoning that Sima Bao would then use the emperor as a puppet.

In fall 316, the Han general Liu Yao, the Prince of Zhongshan, made a major attack against Emperor Min's territory. After he captured the Beidi Commandery (北地, roughly modern Tongchuan, Shaanxi), the other Jin cities in Guanzhong collapsed. Two relief forces arrived but were hesitant to engage Liu Yao. Liu Yao therefore was able to besiege Chang'an, and after the food supply ran out in early December, Emperor Min resolved to surrender. He was delivered by Liu Yao to the Han capital Pingyang (平陽, in modern Linfen, Shanxi).

== After capture by Han-Zhao ==
Liu Cong initially created the former Jin emperor the Marquess of Huai'an. In early 318, at a feast, he had the marquess serve as butler, and a number of former Jin officials could not control themselves and cried out loud at their former emperor's humiliation. Furthermore, around this time, there were a number of uprisings against Han, each claiming to want to capture Han's crown prince Liu Can to exchange him for the former Jin emperor. Liu Can therefore recommended that Sima Ye be executed, and Liu Cong agreed, executing him after receiving Liu Can's report.

== Era name ==
- Jianxing (建興 Jiànxīng) 313–317

== Notes ==
Emperor Min of Jin House of Sima Born: 300 Died: 7 February 318
Regnal titles
Vacant Captured by Han Zhao Title last held by Emperor Huai of Jin	Emperor of China; Western Jin; 313–316	Succeeded by Sima Rui as Prince of Jin
Vacant Captured by Han Zhao Title last held by Emperor Huai of Jin	Emperor of China; Western Jin; 313–316	Succeeded by Liu Cong as Emperor of Han Zhao
