= Pingyi (region) =

Ancient Chinese region

Pingyi (Chinese: 馮翊), also known as Zuo Pingyi (Chinese: 左馮翊), was a historical region of China located in modern Shaanxi province.

In early Han dynasty, the administrator of an area to the east of the capital Chang'an was known as Zuo Neishi (左內史), and the region was also known by the same name. In 104 BC, Zuo Neishi was renamed Zuo Pingyi ("assisting the capital on the left"). In Western Han, the area administered 21 counties: Gaoling (高陵), Yueyang (櫟陽), Didao (翟道), Chiyang (池陽), Xiayang (夏陽), Ya (衙), Suyi (粟邑), Gukou (谷口), Lianshao (蓮勺), Fu (鄜), Pinyang (頻陽), Linjin (臨晉), Chongquan (重泉), Heyang (郃陽), Duiyu (祋祤), Wucheng (武城), Chenyang (沈陽), Huaide (褱德), Zheng (徵), Yunling (雲陵), Wannian (萬年), Changling (長陵), Yangling (陽陵) and Yunyang (雲陽). Over the course of Eastern Han dynasty, 9 counties (Yueyang, Didao, Gukou, Fu, Wucheng, Chenyang, Zheng, Yunling, Huaide) were abolished, and two more (Changling and Yangling) were transferred to the neighboring Jingzhao. In 2 AD, the region had a population of 917,822 in 235,101 households, while the census in 140 AD recorded a population of 145,195 in 37,090 households.

In Cao Wei, Zuo Pingyi was renamed Pingyi Commandery (馮翊郡). 8 counties were administered by the commandery by late Western Jin. It was further divided during the Northern Dynasties, and in early Sui, the remaining Pingyi Commandery was merged into Tong Prefecture (同州).

In Sui and Tang dynasties, Pingyi Commandery was an alternative name for Tong Prefecture. It administered 7 counties including Pingyi, Hancheng (韓城), Heyang, Chaoyi (朝邑), Chengcheng (澄城), Pucheng (蒲城), Xiagui (下邽) and Baishui (白水). In 742, the population was 385,560 in 58,561 households.

== See also ==
- Fufeng (region)
