= Fufeng (region) =

Ancient Chinese region

Fufeng (Chinese: 扶風), also known as You Fufeng (Chinese: 右扶風), was a historical region located in modern western Shaanxi.

In early Han dynasty, the administrator of the capital Chang'an and its vicinities was known as You Neishi (右內史), and the region was also known by the same name. In 104 BC, the western half of You Neishi was split off and renamed You Fufeng ("correcting culture on the right"). In Western Han, the area administered 21 counties: Weicheng (渭城), Huaili (槐里), Hu (鄠), Zhouzhi (盩厔), Li (斄), Yuyi (郁夷), Meiyang (美陽), Mei (郿), Yong (雍), Qi (漆), Xunyi (栒邑), Yumi (隃麋), Chencang (陳倉), Duyang (杜陽), Qian (汧), Haozhi (好畤), Guo (虢), Anling (安陵), Maoling (茂陵), Pingling (平陵), and Wugong (武功). The population was 836,070 in 2 AD, in 216,377 households. In Eastern Han, the commandery administered 15 counties, including Huaili, Anling, Pingling, Maoling, Hu, Mei, Wugong, Chencang, Qian, Yumi, Yong, Xunyi, Meiyang, Qi and Duyang, while the other counties were abolished. In 140 AD, the population was 93,091, in 17,352 households.

In Cao Wei, You Fufeng was renamed Fufeng Commandery (扶風郡). After the establishment of Jin dynasty, Fufeng became a principality with its capital at Chiyang (池陽). It was renamed again to Principality of Qin (秦國) during Emperor Hui's reign. Some counties, including Huaili and Wugong, were split off to form Shiping Commandery (始平郡) in 266.

Northern Wei established Qinping Commandery (秦平郡) in the area, later renamed Qishan (歧山郡) during Western Wei rule. The commandery was abolished in early Sui dynasty and merged to Qi Prefecture (岐州). In 607, Qi Prefecture was renamed Fufeng Commandery. In Tang dynasty, Fufeng Commandery became an alternative name for Fengxiang Prefecture (former Qi Prefecture). In 742, the prefecture administered 9 counties, and had a population of 380,463 in 58,486 households.

== See also ==
- Pingyi (region)
