= Jingyang County =

Jingyang County 泾阳县 Kingyang
- County
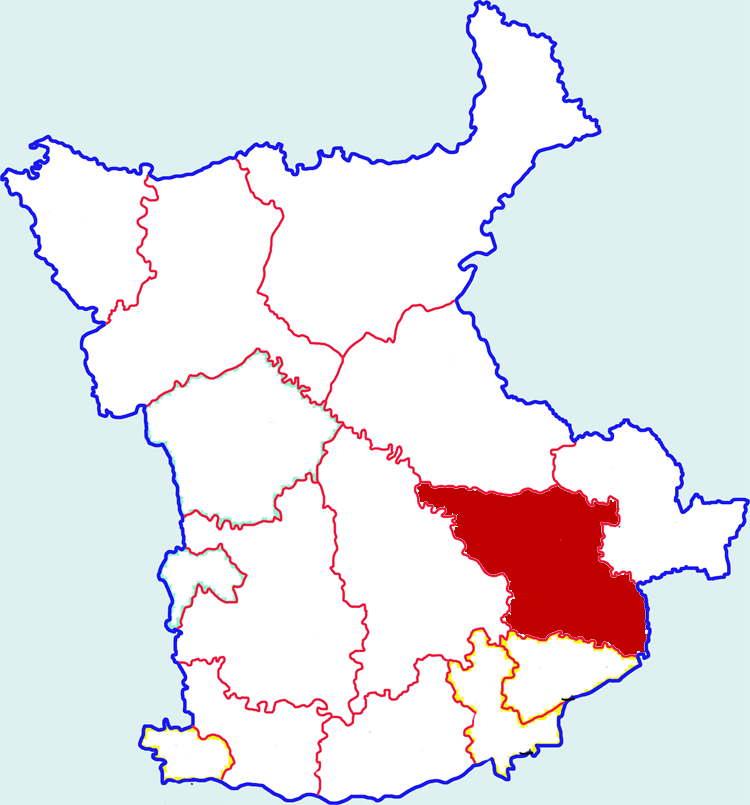
- Jingyang in Xianyang

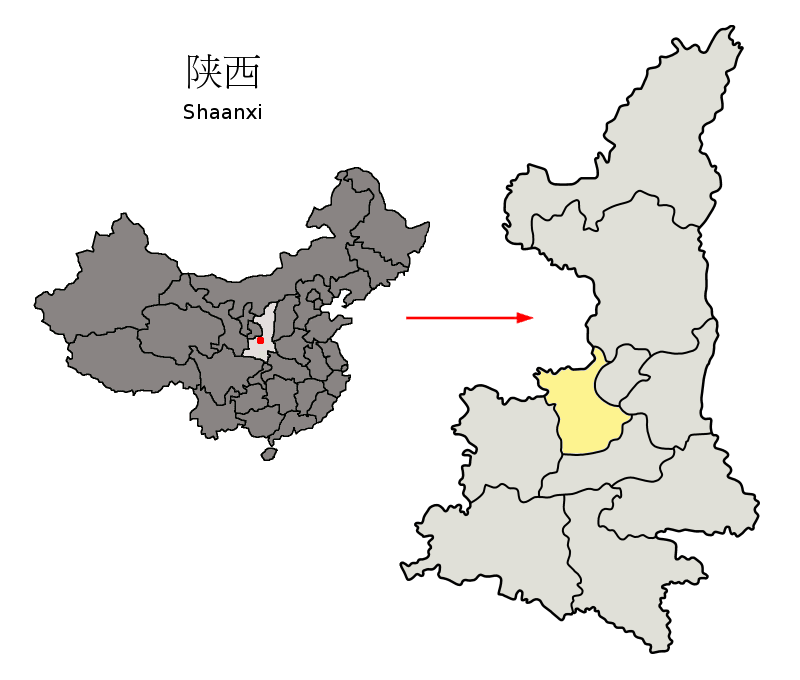
- Xianyang in Shaanxi
- Coordinates: 34°31′37″N 108°50′35″E
- Country: People's Republic of China
- Province: Shaanxi
- Prefecture-level city: Xianyang

Area
  - Total: 780 km^{2} (300 sq mi)

Population (2019)
  - Total: 315,770
  - Density: 400/km^{2} (1,000/sq mi)
- Time zone: UTC+8 (China standard time)
- Postal code: 713700
- Licence plates: 陕D
- Website: www.snjingyang.gov.cn

Jingyang County (simplified Chinese: 泾阳县; traditional Chinese: 涇陽縣; pinyin: Jīngyáng Xiàn) is a county under the administration of the prefecture-level city of Xianyang, in the central part of Shaanxi province, China.

== Administrative divisions ==
As of 2016, this county is divided to 13 towns.

Towns

- Jinggan (泾干镇)
- Yongle (永乐镇)
- Yunyang (云阳镇)
- Qiaode (桥底镇)
- Wangqiao (王桥镇)
- Kou (口镇)
- Sanqu (三渠镇)
- Gaozhuang (高庄镇)
- Taiping (太平镇)
- Chongwen (崇文镇)
- Anwu (安吴镇)
- Xinglong (兴隆镇)
- Zhongzhang (中张镇)

== Climate ==
Climate data for Jingyang, elevation 428 m (1,404 ft), (1991–2020 normals, extremes 1981–present)
Month	Jan	Feb	Mar	Apr	May	Jun	Jul	Aug	Sep	Oct	Nov	Dec	Year
Record high °C (°F)	17.0 (62.6)	24.3 (75.7)	31.2 (88.2)	35.1 (95.2)	37.4 (99.3)	42.3 (108.1)	40.1 (104.2)	39.5 (103.1)	37.7 (99.9)	31.1 (88.0)	25.1 (77.2)	22.7 (72.9)	42.3 (108.1)
Mean daily maximum °C (°F)	5.2 (41.4)	9.6 (49.3)	15.5 (59.9)	21.9 (71.4)	26.7 (80.1)	31.9 (89.4)	32.7 (90.9)	30.3 (86.5)	25.5 (77.9)	19.8 (67.6)	12.8 (55.0)	6.7 (44.1)	19.9 (67.8)
Daily mean °C (°F)	−0.4 (31.3)	3.5 (38.3)	9.2 (48.6)	15.3 (59.5)	20.1 (68.2)	25.3 (77.5)	27.1 (80.8)	25.1 (77.2)	20.0 (68.0)	13.9 (57.0)	6.9 (44.4)	1.0 (33.8)	13.9 (57.0)
Mean daily minimum °C (°F)	−4.6 (23.7)	−1.1 (30.0)	4.0 (39.2)	9.3 (48.7)	13.9 (57.0)	19.1 (66.4)	22.2 (72.0)	20.9 (69.6)	15.9 (60.6)	9.6 (49.3)	2.4 (36.3)	−3.3 (26.1)	9.0 (48.2)
Record low °C (°F)	−13.5 (7.7)	−10.8 (12.6)	−7.8 (18.0)	−0.7 (30.7)	2.8 (37.0)	9.2 (48.6)	14.6 (58.3)	13.1 (55.6)	5.0 (41.0)	−3.8 (25.2)	−8.6 (16.5)	−18.5 (−1.3)	−18.5 (−1.3)
Average precipitation mm (inches)	6.2 (0.24)	8.7 (0.34)	21.1 (0.83)	32.9 (1.30)	49.1 (1.93)	54.8 (2.16)	76.6 (3.02)	75.5 (2.97)	88.3 (3.48)	48.0 (1.89)	20.5 (0.81)	4.6 (0.18)	486.3 (19.15)
Average precipitation days (≥ 0.1 mm)	3.4	3.7	5.3	6.6	8.7	8.2	9.4	9.6	11.0	9.0	5.6	2.9	83.4
Average snowy days	4.2	3.0	1.0	0	0	0	0	0	0	0	1.2	2.4	11.8
Average relative humidity (%)	64	62	62	65	66	61	70	77	80	78	74	66	69
Mean monthly sunshine hours	138.1	135.5	167.4	192.7	210.4	208.1	224.5	203.6	145.3	130.7	129.1	142.2	2,027.6
Percentage possible sunshine	44	43	45	49	49	48	51	49	40	38	42	47	45
Source: China Meteorological Administration August record high
