= Qín Prefecture =

Former administrative division of China

Qin Province, Qín Prefecture or Qinzhou (Chinese: 秦州) was a province in China that existed from the Jin dynasty (266–420) to the Tang and Five Dynasties period. It was named for the former state of Qin and occupied the southeastern area of present-day Gansu. It was variously centered at Shanggui (modern Tianshui, whose Qinzhou District bears its name) and Changji (modern Qin'an).
