= Beidi Commandery =

Chinese administrative district

Beidi Commandery (Chinese: 北地郡; lit. 'Northern Land') was a commandery of the Qin and Han dynasties of China, located in what is now Ningxia. Its seat was Maling (馬領) during the Western Han period and Fuping (富平, near modern Wuzhong, Ningxia) during the Eastern Han.

== History ==
Beidi Commandery was created in 271 BC, when the Qin annexed the lands of the Yiqu people. In late Western Han period, the commandery administered 19 counties: Maling (馬領), Zhilu (直路), Lingwu (靈武), Fuping (富平), Lingzhou (靈州), Xuyan (昫衍), Fangqu (方渠), Chudao (除道), Wujie (五街), Chungu (鶉孤), Guide (歸德), Huihuo (回獲), Luepandao (略畔道), Niyang (泥陽), Yuzhi (郁郅), Yiqudao (義渠道), Yiju (弋居), Dayi (大呓) and Lian (廉). The total population in 2 AD was 210,688 (64,461 households). The Eastern Han census in 140 AD, however, documented a population of only 18,637 (3,122 households), and the number of counties had reduced to 6.

The commandery was located on the Han dynasty's northern frontier. From 87 to 96 AD, a large number of Xiongnu people were settled in the commandery. Due to attacks by the Qiang people, the commandery's administration was relocated to Zuopingyi (in modern Shaanxi) from 111 to 129. The original territories of Beidi were eventually abandoned in 141 after another wave of Qiang attacks.

The Beidi Commandery of Cao Wei and Western Jin dynasties was located in modern Shaanxi. It administered 2 counties, Niyang and Fuping, and had a population of 2,600 households in 280 AD.
