= 310s =

Decade

The 310s decade ran from January 1, 310, to December 31, 319.

== Events ==
=== By place ===
==== Roman Empire ====
- Maximian, retired emperor, rebels against Constantine I in Arles while the latter is campaigning against the Franks.
- Maximinus Daza, caesar under Emperor Galerius, is acclaimed augustus by his troops. Galerius is forced to recognize him as co-ruler of the East. The Roman Empire is thus divided between seven simultaneous emperors: Galerius (East), Maximinus II (East), Licinius (Middle), Constantine I (West), Maximian (West), Maxentius (Italy), and Domitius Alexander (Africa).
- July – Maximian flees to Marseille where he is besieged and surrenders. Constantine encourages his suicide and Maximian, age 60, hangs himself. Emperor Maxentius condemns the killing of his father.
- Licinius campaigns with success against the Carpi.

==== Asia ====
- Haelhae becomes the king of the Korean kingdom of Silla.

=== By topic ===
==== Commerce ====
- At Trier, Constantine orders the minting of a new coin, the solidus, in an effort to offset the declining value of the denarius and bring stability to the imperial currency by restoring a gold standard. The solidus (later known as the bezant) will be minted in the Byzantine Empire without change in weight or purity until the 10th century.

==== Religion ====
- April 18 – Pope Eusebius succeeds Pope Marcellus I as the 31st pope, but is banished on August 17 by the Emperor Maxentius to Sicily, where he dies, perhaps from a hunger strike.

=== By place ===
==== Roman Empire ====
- April 30 – On his deathbed, Emperor Galerius declares religious freedom and issues the Edict of Serdica, ending the Diocletianic Persecution of Christians in the eastern half of the Roman Empire.
- May 5 – Galerius dies at age 51 from a gruesome disease, possibly colorectal cancer or Fournier gangrene.
- Maximinus Daza and Licinius divide the Eastern Empire between themselves.
- Maximinus recommences the persecution of Christians, having encouraged his subjects to petition him to do so.
- Fearing an alliance between Licinius and Constantine I, Maximinus forges a secret alliance with Emperor Maxentius.

==== China ====
- July 13 – Disaster of Yongjia: Xiongnu soldiers led by Liu Cong conquer and pillage the Jin dynasty capital at Luoyang and capture Emperor Huai; 30,000 residents in the city are massacred.

=== By topic ===
==== Religion ====
- July 2 – Pope Miltiades succeeds Eusebius as the 32nd pope of Rome.
- The Donatist schism begins in the African Church.

=== By place ===
==== Roman Empire ====
- Constantine I crosses the Cottian Alps with an army (40,000 men) and defeats Maxentius's generals in three battles at Turin, Brescia and Verona. Maxentius's Praetorian Prefect Ruricius Pompeianus is killed in the fighting outside Verona.
- October 28 – Battle of the Milvian Bridge: Constantine defeats Maxentius at the Milvian Bridge, becoming the only Roman emperor in the West. Prior to the battle, he reportedly has a vision of a cross (labarum) with the phrase "in hoc signo vinces" ("In this sign you shall conquer"). This encourages him to convert to Christianity.
- October 29 – Constantine enters Rome; he stages a grand adventus in the city, and is met with popular jubilation. Maxentius' body is fished out of the Tiber and decapitated.
- Constantine forges an alliance with co-emperor Licinius, and offers him his half-sister, Constantia, in marriage. The Praetorian Guard and Imperial Horse Guard (equites singulares Augusti) are disbanded.
- Emperor Maximinus Daza campaigns unsuccessfully against the Armenians.

=== By topic ===
==== Religion ====
- Constantine I adopts the words "in hoc signo vinces" as a motto, and has the letters X and P (the first letters of the Greek word Christ) emblazoned on the shields of his soldiers.
- The Council of Carthage supports Donatism, which espouses a rigorous application and interpretation of the sacraments. These doctrines will be condemned by the Council of Arles (314).
- Constantine I promotes a policy of state sponsorship of Christianity, perhaps even becoming a Christian himself (see Constantine the Great and Christianity).

=== By place ===
==== Roman Empire ====
- At the end of 312 or in early 313, the retired Emperor Diocletian dies in his palace in Split, most likely from natural causes.
- February: Emperors Constantine I and Licinius convene in Mediolanum (modern Milan). Licinius marries Constantine's half-sister Constantia, and they issue the Edict of Milan. This edict ends the Great Persecution against the Christians and is the first piece of legislation in western history to decree freedom of religion. It also returns property confiscated from Christians. The edict is posted in Nicomedia on June 13.
- Emperor Maximinus Daza crosses the Bosphorus with an army of 70,000 men and lays siege to Heraclea in Thrace. He captures the city after eight days.
- Battle of Tzirallum: Licinius defeats his rival Maximinus in Thrace, who then flees to Cilicia. After losing the Cilician Gates to Licinius' forces, Maximinus commits suicide.
- Licinius conducts a purge of the wider Tetrarchic dynasty. He executes Galerius' son Candidianus, Valerius Severus' son Severianus (whom he accuses of conspiracy), and Maximinus' wife, son and daughter. Diocletian's wife Prisca and daughter Galeria Valeria go into hiding.

==== Asia ====
- March 14 – Emperor Huai of Jin is executed by Liu Cong, ruler of the Xiongnu state (Han-Zhao). At the imperial new year he and a number of former Jin officials are poisoned. Crown prince Min of Jin, age 13, succeeds, in Chang'an, his uncle Huai of Jin and becomes the new emperor of the Jin Dynasty.
- Nintoku, the fourth son of Ōjin, becomes the 16th emperor of Japan. The historical profile of Nintoku is generally accepted as fact without attributing all of the things he allegedly accomplished.

=== By topic ===
==== Art and Science ====
- Basilica of Maxentius and Constantine (or Basilica Nova), in Rome, is finished.

==== Religion ====
- February 3 – Edict of Milan: Constantine the Great and co-emperor Licinius meet at a conference in Mediolanum (modern Milan). They proclaim a policy of religious freedom for all, ending the persecution of Christians in the Roman Empire and returning property confiscated from Christians. The edict is posted in Nicomedia on June 13.
- October 2 – Lateran Synod: Donatism is declared a heresy.
- Arius preaches of the human nature of Jesus.

=== By place ===
==== Roman Empire ====
- A large Pictish raid southwards in Roman Britain is attempted.

=== By topic ===
==== Religion ====
- January 10 – Pope Miltiades' reign ends.
- January 31 – Pope Sylvester I succeeds Pope Miltiades as the 33rd pope.
- August 30 – Council of Arles: Confirms the pronouncement of Donatism as a schism, and passes other canons.
- Synod of Ancyra: Consulting a magician is declared a sin earning five years of penance.
- Alexander becomes Bishop of Byzantium.

=== By place ===
==== Roman Empire ====
- Constantine the Great and co-emperor Licinius battle the Sarmates, the Goths and the Carpians along the Danube. Constantine leads a punitive expedition into Dacia and reestablishes the Roman fortifications of the frontier.
- July 25 – The Arch of Constantine is completed near the Colosseum at Rome to commemorate Constantine's victory over Maxentius at the Milvian Bridge. As part of the ceremony Constantine is expected to make a sacrifice to Rome's traditional gods, but he refuses to do so.
- Constantine I dedicates the Basilica of Maxentius and installs a large statue of himself inside it.
- Crucifixion is abolished as punishment in the Roman Empire.
- A program of assistance to the poor is established in the Roman Empire.
- Immense baths are constructed in Augusta Treverorum (modern-day Trier).

=== By topic ===
==== Religion ====
- Eusebius becomes bishop of Caesarea (approximate date).
- The lamb becomes the symbol of Jesus in Christian art.

=== By place ===
==== Roman Empire ====
- Emperor Constantine the Great issues an edict, prohibiting the punishment of slaves by crucifixion and facial branding.
- Constantine I sends his half-brother Julius Constantius to Licinius at Sirmium (Pannonia), with the proposal to accept Bassianus as Caesar and give him power over Italy. Licinius refuses, and forces a conspiracy against Constantine.
- Licinius elevates Valerius Valens to Augustus, and mobilises an army against Constantine. Bassianus is accused of conspiracy and executed.
- October 8 – Battle of Cibalae: Constantine the Great defeats his rival Licinius near the town of Colonia Aurelia Cibalae (modern-day Vinkovci, Croatia). Licinius is forced to flee to Sirmium and loses all of the Balkans except for Thrace. Peace negotiations are initiated between the two Augusti, but they are unsuccessful.
- December – Battle of Mardia: Constantine I defeats his rival Licinius and senior officer Valerius Valens, near the town of Harmanli (Bulgaria).

==== Asia ====
- Han-Zhao forces capture Chang'an, capital of the Chinese Western Jin dynasty. Emperor Min of Jin surrenders to Liu Yao, ending the Western Jin.

=== By topic ===
==== Religion ====
- At the request of the Christians, Constantine I attempts to end the schism with the Donatist sect.

=== By place ===
==== Roman Empire ====
- March 1 – Emperor Constantine the Great and co-emperor Licinius elevate their sons Crispus, Constantine II and Licinius II to Caesars. After this arrangement Constantine rules the dioceses Pannonia and Macedonia, and establishes his residence at Sirmium, from where he prepares a campaign against the Goths and Sarmatians.
- Licinius recognizes Constantine I as senior emperor and executes Valerius Valens.

==== Asia ====
- Sixteen Kingdoms: Jingwen (later Yuan of Jin) flees with remnants of the Jin court and noble families to the south. He succeeds Emperor Min of Jin as first ruler of the Eastern Jin Dynasty and decides to make Jiankang (modern Nanjing) his new capital.
- The earliest historically verified reference to tea is recorded, although the Chinese have been drinking the beverage for centuries.

=== By place ===
==== Roman Empire ====
- Emperor Constantine the Great gives the ancient Roman town Drepana (Asia Minor) the name Helenopolis, after his mother Helena, and builds a church in honour of the martyr St. Lucian.
- Constantine the Great is given the title Brittanicus Maximus, for successful engagements in Britain.

==== Asia ====
- The Eastern Jin dynasty loses its territories to the north of the Yangtze River, to the benefit of the Xiongnu and the Xianbei. The Former Zhao state is proclaimed; Liu Can and the state ruling family at Pingyang is executed in a coup d'état by Jin Zhun, who is in turn overthrown by Shi Le and Liu Yao.
- Liu Yao becomes the new emperor of Han-Zhao and moves his capital to Chang'an.

=== By topic ===
==== Religion ====
- Gregory the Illuminator appoints his son Aristax as successor in the patriarchate of Armenia.

=== By place ===
==== Roman Empire ====
- Emperor Constantine the Great prohibits the separation of the families of slaves, during a change in ownership.

==== India ====
- King Chandragupta I succeeds his father Ghatotkacha, as ruler of the Gupta dynasty.

==== Georgia ====
- Christianity is introduced in Colchis, present-day Georgia.

=== By topic ===
==== Religion ====
- Arius travels to Nicomedia at the invitation of Bishop Eusebius, after having been accused of heresy and condemned by Alexander, the Patriarch of Alexandria. This gives rise to the Arian Controversy.

== Significant people ==
- Tiridates III, King of Armenia (287–330)
- Ousanas, King of Axum (c.310-c.320)
- Huai, Emperor of China (307 - 313)
- Min, Emperor of China (313 - 317)
- Yuan, Emperor of China (317 - 322)
- Fíacha Sroiptine, High King of Ireland (285-322)
- Ōjin, Emperor of Japan, 270-310
- Nintoku, Emperor of Japan, 313-399
- Shapur II, Sassanid dynasty King of Persia (309-379)
- Galerius, Roman Emperor (305-311)
- Constantine the Great, Roman Emperor (306-337)
- Maxentius, Roman Emperor (306-312)
- Licinius, Roman Emperor (308-324)
- Maximinus II, Roman Emperor (311-313)
- Alexander of Byzantium, Bishop of Byzantium (314-337)
- Pope Eusebius, Pope of the Roman Catholic Church (309-310)
- Metrophanes of Byzantium, Bishop of Byzantium (306-314)
- Miltiades, Pope of the Roman Catholic Church (311-314)
- Sylvester I, Pope of the Roman Catholic Church (314-335)
- Girim, King of Silla (298–310)
- Heulhae, King of Silla (310–356)

== Births ==
310

- Ausonius, Roman poet and rhetorician (d. 395)
- Epiphanius of Salamis, Church Father (d. 403)
- Wulfila, Gothic bishop and missionary (d. 383)

312

- Dao'an, Chinese Buddhist monk and writer (d. 385)
- Huan Wen (or Yuanzi), Chinese general (d. 373)

313

- Cyril of Jerusalem, Christian bishop and theologian (d. 386)
- Didymus the Blind, Alexandrian theologian (d. 398)
- Shi Hong, Chinese emperor of the Jie state (d. 334)

314

- Libanius, Greek rhetorician and sophist (approximate date)
- Li Qi, Chinese emperor of the Cheng Han Dynasty (d. 338)
- Zhi Dun, Chinese Buddhist monk and philosopher (d. 366)

315

- Flavius Hannibalianus, ruler of Armenia and Pontus (d. 337)
- Hilary of Poitiers, Christian bishop and Doctor of the Church
- Himerius, Greek sophist and rhetorician (approximate date)
- Vettius Agorius Praetextatus, Roman politician (d. 384)

316

- Constantine II, Roman emperor (d. 340)
- Martin of Tours, bishop of Tours (d. 397)

317

- August 7 – Constantius II, Roman emperor (d. 361)
- Fú Jiàn, Chinese emperor of the Former Qin (d. 355)
- Junius Bassus Theotecnius, Roman politician (d. 359)
- Themistius, Byzantine statesman and philosopher

318

- Liu, Chinese empress and wife of Shi Hu (d. 349)

319

- Murong Jun, Chinese emperor of the Former Yan (d. 360)

== Deaths ==
310

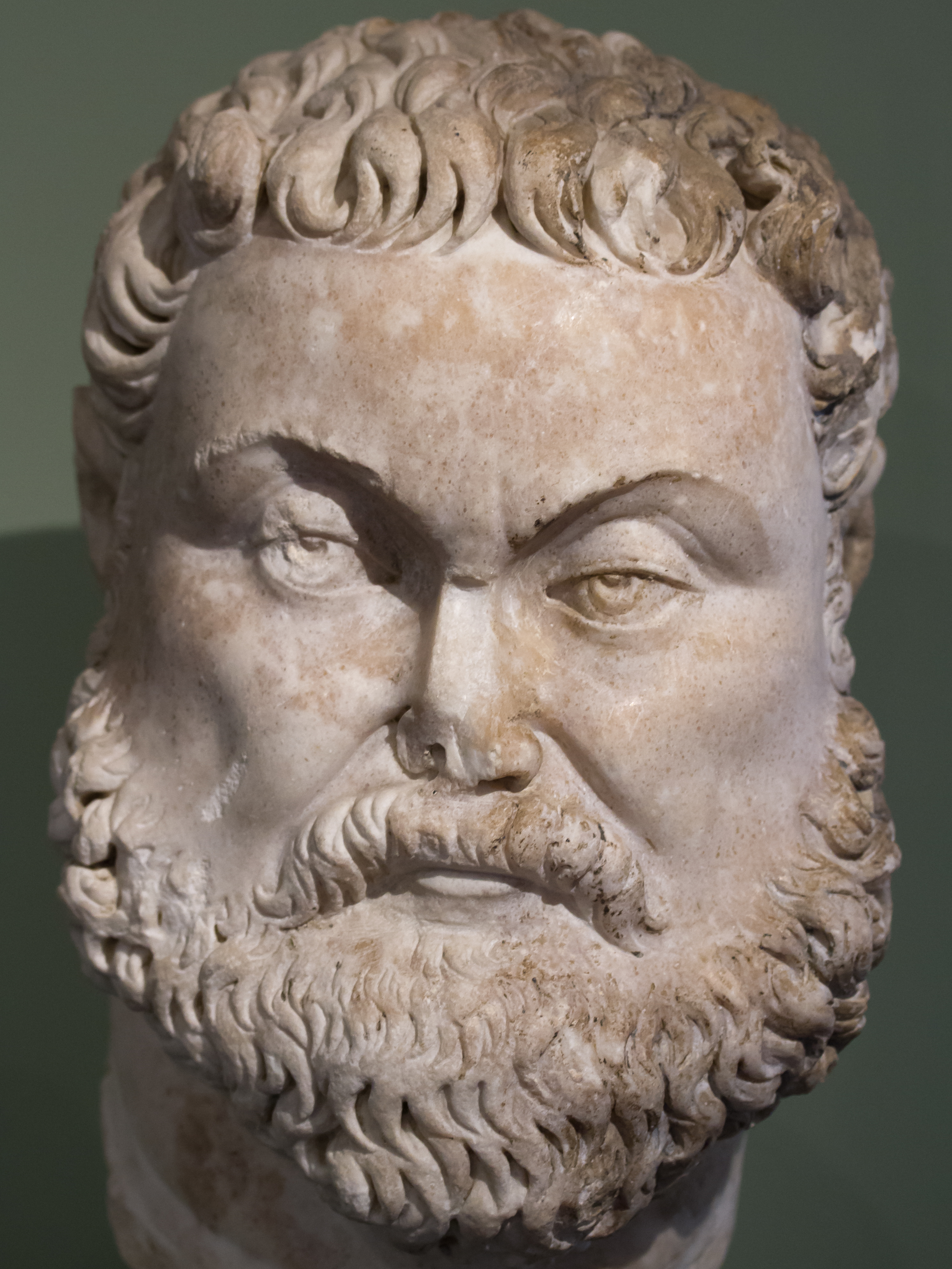
Emperor Maximian

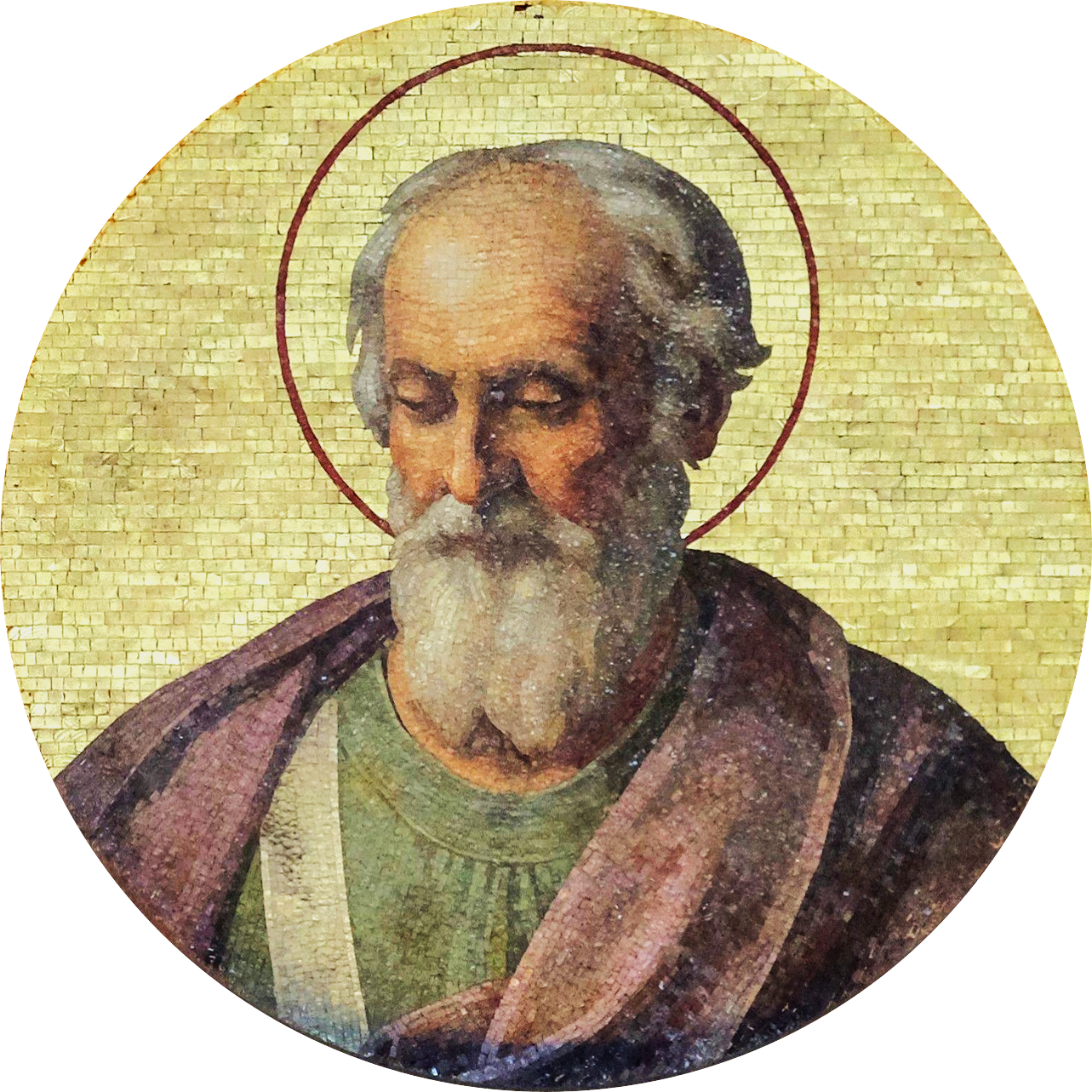
Pope Eusebius

- August 17 – Eusebius, bishop of Rome
- July – Maximian, Roman emperor (b. c. 250)
- Dan, Chinese empress of Xiongnu (or Han-Zhao)
- Domnina, Berenice, and Prosdoce, Christian martyrs
- Liu He, Chinese emperor of Xiongnu (or Han-Zhao)
- Liu Yuan, Chinese emperor of Xiongnu (or Han-Zhao)
- Luo Shang, Chinese general of the Jin dynasty (266–420)
- Emperor Ōjin of Japan, according to legend.

311

- April 23 – Sima Yue (or Yuanchao), Chinese prince and regent
- May 5
  - Galerius, Roman emperor (b. c.258)
  - Wang Yan, Chinese official and politician (b. 256)
- October 7 – Gou Xi (or Daojiang), Chinese inspector and general
- November 25 – Peter I, patriarch of Alexandria
- December 3 – Diocletian, Roman emperor (b. 244)
- Domitius Alexander, Roman emperor and usuper
- Wang Mi (or Zigu), Chinese general and rebel leader

312

- October 28 – Maxentius, Roman emperor (b. 283)
- Clement of Ancyra, Christian bishop and martyr
- Guo Xiang, Chinese scholar and philosopher (b. 252)
- Huyan, Chinese empress of the Xiongnu state
- Ruricius Pompeianus, Roman praetorian prefect

313

- March 14 – Huai of Jin, Chinese emperor (b. 284)
- Achillas (the Great), pope and patriarch of Alexandria
- Galerius Valerius Maximinus, Roman emperor (b. 270)
- Candidianus (son of Galerius)
- Severianus, son of Valerius Severus
- Guangxian, Chinese empress of the Xiongnu state
- Zhang Huiguang (or Wuxiao), Chinese empress

314

- January 10 – Miltiades (or Melchiades), bishop of Rome
- Liu E (or Lihua), Chinese empress of the Xiongnu state
- Wang Jun (or Pengzu), Chinese general and warlord (b. 252)
- Zhang Gui, Chinese governor and duke of Xiping (b. 255)

315

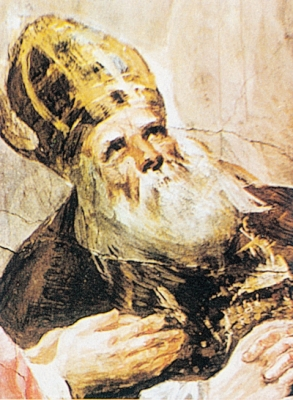
Saint Valerius of Saragossa

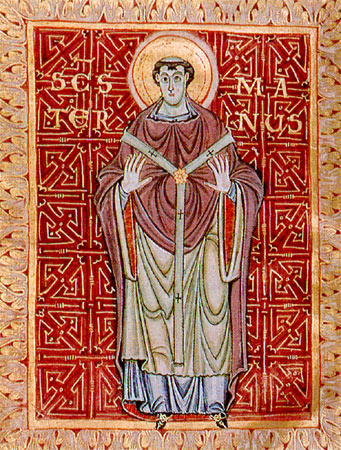
Saint Maternus of Cologne

- September 14 – Maternus of Cologne, bishop of Trier
- Du Tao (or Jingwen), Chinese general and rebel leader
- Galeria Valeria, Roman empress and wife of Galerius
- Prisca, Roman empress and wife of Diocletian (b. 247)
- Valerius of Saragossa, Christian bishop and martyr

316

- Diocletian, Roman emperor, commits suicide (b. 244) (most historians date his death to 311 or 312)
- Blaise, bishop of Sebastea (martyred)
- Bassianus, Roman advisor and politician
- Suo Chen (or Juxiu), Chinese general
- Tuoba Pugen, Chinese chieftain of the Tuoba clan
- Tuoba Yilu, Chinese chieftain of the Tuoba clan

317

- Valerius Valens, Roman emperor

318

- February 7 – Min of Jin, Chinese emperor (b. 300)
- August 31 – Liu Cong, Chinese emperor
- Fan Changsheng, Chinese religious leader
- Jin Zhun, Chinese official and chancellor
- Liu Can (or Shiguang), Chinese emperor
- Liu Kun, Chinese general and poet (b. 270)
- Theodota of Philippi, Greek harlot and martyr

319

- Du Zeng, Chinese general and rebel leader
- Ghatotkacha, Indian ruler of the Gupta Empire
- Theodore Stratelates, Greek general and martyr (b. 281)
