= 313 =

313 in various calendars
Gregorian calendar	313; CCCXIII
Ab urbe condita	1066
Assyrian calendar	5063
Balinese saka calendar	234–235
Bengali calendar	−281 – −280
Berber calendar	1263
Buddhist calendar	857
Burmese calendar	−325
Byzantine calendar	5821–5822
Chinese calendar	壬申年 (Water Monkey); 3010 or 2803 — to — 癸酉年 (Water Rooster); 3011 or 2804
Coptic calendar	29–30
Discordian calendar	1479
Ethiopian calendar	305–306
Hebrew calendar	4073–4074
- Hindu calendars
Vikram Samvat	369–370
Shaka Samvat	234–235
Kali Yuga	3413–3414
Holocene calendar	10313
Iranian calendar	309 BP – 308 BP
Islamic calendar	319 BH – 318 BH
Javanese calendar	193–194
Julian calendar	313; CCCXIII
Korean calendar	2646
Minguo calendar	1599 before ROC 民前1599年
Nanakshahi calendar	−1155
Seleucid era	624/625 AG
Thai solar calendar	855–856
Tibetan calendar	ཆུ་ཕོ་སྤྲེ་ལོ་ (male Water-Monkey); 439 or 58 or −714 — to — ཆུ་མོ་བྱ་ལོ་ (female Water-Bird); 440 or 59 or −713

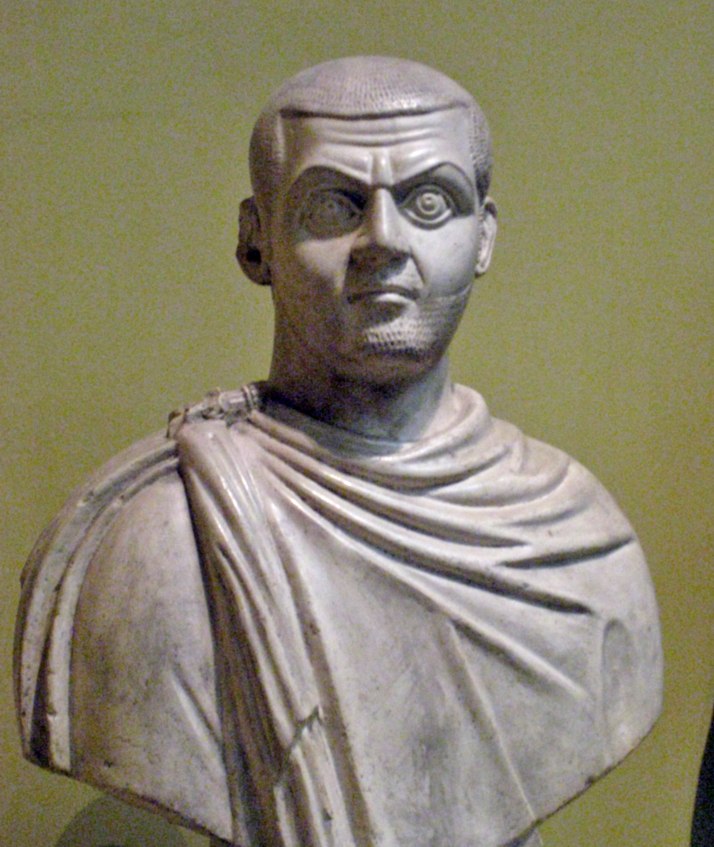
Emperor Maximinus Daza (r. 310–313)

Year 313 (CCCXIII) was a common year starting on Thursday of the Julian calendar. At the time, it was known as the Year of the Consulship of Constantinus and Licinianus (or, less frequently, year 1066 Ab urbe condita). The denomination 313 for this year has been used since the early medieval period, when the Anno Domini calendar era became the prevalent method in Europe for naming years. This year is notable for ending of the persecution of Christians in the Roman Empire.

== Events ==
=== By place ===
==== Roman Empire ====
- At the end of 312 or in early 313, the retired Emperor Diocletian dies in his palace in Split, most likely from natural causes.
- February: Emperors Constantine I and Licinius convene in Mediolanum (modern Milan). Licinius marries Constantine's half-sister Constantia, and they issue the Edict of Milan. This edict ends the Great Persecution against the Christians and is the first piece of legislation in western history to decree freedom of religion. It also returns property confiscated from Christians. The edict is posted in Nicomedia on June 13.
- Emperor Maximinus Daza crosses the Bosphorus with an army of 70,000 men and lays siege to Heraclea in Thrace. He captures the city after eight days.
- Battle of Tzirallum: Licinius defeats his rival Maximinus in Thrace, who then flees to Cilicia. After losing the Cilician Gates to Licinius' forces, Maximinus commits suicide.
- Licinius conducts a purge of the wider Tetrarchic dynasty. He executes Galerius' son Candidianus, Valerius Severus' son Severianus (whom he accuses of conspiracy), and Maximinus' wife, son and daughter. Diocletian's wife Prisca and daughter Galeria Valeria go into hiding.

==== Asia ====
- March 14 – Emperor Huai of Jin is executed by Liu Cong, ruler of the Xiongnu state (Han-Zhao). At the imperial new year he and a number of former Jin officials are poisoned. Crown prince Min of Jin, age 13, succeeds, in Chang'an, his uncle Huai of Jin and becomes the new emperor of the Jin Dynasty.
- Nintoku, the fourth son of Ōjin, becomes the 16th emperor of Japan. The historical profile of Nintoku is generally accepted as fact without attributing all of the things he allegedly accomplished.

=== By topic ===
==== Art and Science ====
- Basilica of Maxentius and Constantine (or Basilica Nova), in Rome, is finished.

==== Religion ====
- February 3 – Edict of Milan: Constantine the Great and co-emperor Licinius meet at a conference in Mediolanum (modern Milan). They proclaim a policy of religious freedom for all, ending the persecution of Christians in the Roman Empire and returning property confiscated from Christians. The edict is posted in Nicomedia on June 13.
- October 2 – Lateran Synod: Donatism is declared a heresy.
- Arius preaches of the human nature of Jesus.

== Births ==
- Cyril of Jerusalem, Christian bishop and theologian (d. 386)
- Didymus the Blind, Alexandrian theologian (d. 398)
- Shi Hong, Chinese emperor of the Jie state (d. 334)

== Deaths ==
- March 14 – Huai of Jin, Chinese emperor (b. 284)
- Achillas (the Great), pope and patriarch of Alexandria
- Galerius Valerius Maximinus, Roman emperor (b. 270)
- Candidianus (son of Galerius)
- Severianus, son of Valerius Severus
- Guangxian, Chinese empress of the Xiongnu state
- Zhang Huiguang (or Wuxiao), Chinese empress
