= Consort Jin =

Consort Jin may refer to:

== Imperial consorts with the surname Jin ==
- Jin Yueguang (fl. 315) and Jin Yuehua (fl. 315–318), two of Liu Cong's later empresses
- Empress Jin (Yin) (fl. 318), wife of the Han Zhao emperor Liu Can
- Jin Feishan (died 926), wife of the Former Shu emperor Wang Yan
- Lady Jin (fl. 933–935), wife of the Min emperor Wang Yanjun

== Imperial consorts with the title Consort Jin ==
- Imperial Noble Consort Dunhui (1856–1933), concubine of the Tongzhi Emperor
- Imperial Noble Consort Wenjing (1873–1924), concubine of the Guangxu Emperor
