= De mortibus persecutorum =

Christian text by Lactantius

De mortibus persecutorum (On the Deaths of the Persecutors) is a hybrid historical and Christian apologetical work by the Roman philosopher Lactantius, written in Latin sometime after AD 316.

== Contents ==
After the monumental Divine Institutes, the comparatively brief De mortibus persecutorum is probably the most important extant work of Lactantius, a convert to Christianity who served at the courts of both the pagan Diocletian and the Christian Constantine the Great. In this work, Lactantius describes in occasionally lurid detail the downfall and deaths of the most egregious persecutors of Christians. The first few chapters briefly cover the ends of the earliest Christian persecutors: Nero, Domitian, Decius, Valerian, and Aurelian. The bulk of the work, however, concerns the deeds and deaths of the Tetrarchy: Diocletian, Maximian, Galerius, Constantius, Maximinus, Constantine and Maxentius. It is one of the most important extant primary sources for the Great Persecution of Christians which was initiated by Diocletian and Galerius in AD 303, containing information on individuals and events from that period that appear nowhere else.

As to his reason for writing, Lactantius says in Chapter 1:

Of the end of those men I have thought good to publish a narrative, that all who are afar off, and all who shall arise hereafter, may learn how the Almighty manifested his power and sovereign greatness in rooting out and utterly destroying the enemies of His name.

While this quote reveals the apologetic character of the work, Lactantius was also quite aware of the historical import, saying:

I relate all those things on the authority of well-informed persons, and I thought it proper to commit them to writing exactly as they happened, lest the memory of events so important should perish, and lest any future historian of the persecutors should corrupt the truth.

Several historical figures are known to us completely or primarily from Lactantius's account in De Mortibus Persecutorum, among them: Prisca, the wife of Diocletian; Galeria Valeria, the daughter of Diocletian and wife of Galerius; Candidianus, the son of Galerius; Severus, the short-lived Augustus of the West; and Flavius Severianus, the son of Severus.

== Constantine's dream of the cross ==
One of the most important passages in De Mortibus Persecutorum occurs in Chapter XLIV wherein Lactantius describes the Battle of the Milvian Bridge and the theophany which Constantine experienced just prior to the battle. Differing from the account of Eusebius Pamphilus who specifically recounts a vision of a cross in the sky with the words, in hoc signo vinces, Lactantius describes a dream in which Constantine is instructed to paint the chi-rho on the shields of his soldiers.

== The Edict of Milan ==
This work is also one of the sources, along with the Ecclesiastical History of Eusebius Pamphilus, of the Edict of Milan. The document is recorded here by Lactantius in the original Latin whereas the version in Eusebius is a translation from Latin into Greek.

== Manuscript history ==
De Mortibus Persecutorum was mentioned among the works of Lactantius by Saint Jerome in his work, De Viris Illustribus. Jerome called the work De Persecutione and the work was considered lost for centuries until a manuscript was discovered in 1678 preserved in the Augustine Convent library in Moissac, France. For decades after the discovery, the authenticity of the work was disputed by scholars. French scholar Rene Pinchon proved decisively that Lactantius was the author in 1902 and this view has subsequently been adopted by most scholars.

Since its rediscovery, the work has been translated into English several times, including versions by John Fell (1680), Gilbert Burnett (1687), Lord Hailes (1782), M. F. MacDonald (1964), and J. L. Creed (1984). See listings in the bibliography below.

== Controversy and criticism ==
The discovery of De Mortibus Persecutorum in the 17th century caused some controversy. For example, the mention by Lactantius that the Apostle Peter arrived in Rome during the reign of Nero seemed to contradict the established belief of the Catholic Church that Peter had arrived much earlier in AD 44. The work was also appropriated by Protestant scholars who attempted to compare the persecuting tyrants of the Tetrarchy with King Louis XIV of France and King James II of England.

Lactantius has long been criticized as a biased observer of the events he records, writing polemic rather than history. Timothy Barnes summed up this position saying about De Mortibus Persecutorum: "Lactantius' prejudices and strong opinions foster the suspicion that he must have tailored the facts to suit his thesis."

== Bibliography ==
- Healy, Patrick (2012) [1910]. "Lucius Caecilius Firmianus Lactantius". The Catholic Encyclopedia. Vol. 8. New York City, NY: Robert Appleton Company.
- Lactantius. Lord Hailes (transl.) (2021) On the Deaths of the Persecutors: A Translation of De Mortibus Persecutorum by Lucius Cæcilius Firmianus Lactantius Evolution Publishing, Merchantville, NJ ISBN 978-1-935228-20-2, p. 2
- Lactantius. J. L Creed. De Mortibus Persecutorum. Oxford: Clarendon Press, 1984.
- Lactantius. McDonald, Mary Francis (transl.) 1964. Lactantius: The Minor Works. Catholic University of America Press: Washington, DC.
- Lactantius (1964). The Divine Institutes: Books I–VII. Translated by Mary Francis McDonald. Washington, D.C.: Catholic University of America Press. pp. 15–544. ISBN 9780813211497.
