= Consort Zhang =

Consort Zhang may refer to:

- Zhang Yan (empress) (died 163 BC), wife of Emperor Hui of Han
- Empress Zhang (Liu Shan's first wife) (died 237)
- Empress Zhang (Liu Shan's second wife) (died after 264)
- Empress Zhang (Cao Fang) (died after 254)
- Empress Dowager Zhang (Former Zhao) (died 313), concubine of Liu Yuan
- Zhang Huiguang (died 313), wife of Liu Cong
- Empress Zhang (Later Zhao) (died 349), wife of Shi Zun
- Honoured Lady Zhang (fl.370-396), concubine of Emperor Xiaowu of Jin
- Empress Zhang (Later Qin) (fl. 402), wife of Yao Xing
- Empress Dowager Zhang (Liu Song dynasty) (died 426), concubine of Liu Yu
- Empress Zhang (Liang dynasty) (died 552 or later), wife of Xiao Dong
- Zhang Yao'er (506–570), wife of Chen Baxian
- Empress Zhang (Tang dynasty) (died 762), wife of Emperor Suzong
- Empress Zhang (Later Liang) (died 913), wife of Zhu Yougui
- Consort Zhang (Zhu Zhen) (892–915)
- Empress Zhang (Wang Yanzheng's wife) (fl. 943)
- Consort Zhang (Renzong) (1024–1054), concubine of Emperor Renzong of Song
- Empress Zhang (Hongxi) (1379–1442)
- Empress Zhang (Hongzhi) (1471–1541)
- Empress Zhang (Jiajing) (died 1537)
- Empress Zhang (Tianqi) (1606–1644)
- Consort Qing (Xianfeng) (1840–1885), concubine of the Xianfeng Emperor
