= Liang Lanbi =

4th-century empress of Western Jin dynasty

Liang Lanbi (梁蘭璧; (Note: As noted below, the official history (known as the Book of Jin, with the Tang dynasty chancellor Fang Xuanling as its lead editor) for Jin did not include a biography for her. Her name was, however, noted as Lanbi in the Book of Jin authored by Zang Rongxu (臧榮緒). See Book of Jin by Zang Rongxu, "九家舊晉書輯本 臧榮緒晉書". Archived from the original on 2010-01-02., vol. 4.) fl. 300–311) was an empress during the Jin dynasty. Her husband was the ill-fated Sima Chi (Emperor Huai). Volume 138 of Taiping Yulan had a short biography on her, citing the Book of Jin authored by Zang Rongxu. She was also the last empress of the Western Jin, as her husband's nephew and successor Emperor Min was not recorded to have an empress during his reign.

Very little is known about her, and she was not even listed in the biographies of the empresses in the Book of Jin, the official history of the dynasty. (Note: See Book of Jin, vols. 31, 32.) She was from Anding, and her father was Liang Fen (梁芬), (Note: Emperor Min's biography in the Tang-era Book of Jin recorded that Liang Fen was made situ on 7 June 313.) son of Liang Hongji (梁鸿季). (Note: According to the Book of Jin by Wang Yin, "Hongji" was Liang Liu's courtesy name, and he was a cousin (son of a paternal aunt) of Huangfu Mi. Liang was also Administrator of Chengyang. Emperor Wu's biography in the Tang-era Book of Jin recorded that Liang Liu, as Administrator of Yangping, was rewarded for good administration during the 4th month of the 10th year of the Tai'kang era. Vol.86 of Zizhi Tongjian recorded that Liang Liu was killed in the 6th month of the 1st year of the Guang'xi era; the month corresponds to 28 Jun to 26 Jul 306 in the Julian calendar.) She had married Sima Chi long before he became emperor (most probably during his tenure as Prince of Yuzhang, although the date is not known). (Note: The Book of Jin by Zang Rongxu indicated that Lady Liang was the Princess Consort of Yuzhang at one point. Sima Chi was created the Prince of Yuzhang on 22 December 289 (jiashen day of the 11th month of the 10th year of the Tai'kang era, per Emperor Wu's biography in the Tang-era Book of Jin).) When he was crown prince from February 305 to January 307, she carried the title of crown princess. When he became emperor on 11 January 307, she was created empress. Nothing further is known about her, including her fate when both she and her husband were captured by Han-Zhao forces in July 311. However, it appeared that at least by later that year, when the Han-Zhao emperor Liu Cong created him the Duke of Kuaiji, she had either died (Note: Zang Rongxu's Book of Jin recorded that she was captured by Hu barbarians during the Yong'jia era, presumably during the Disaster of Yongjia (永嘉中，没胡贼。). What happened to her after her capture was unrecorded.) or had been taken elsewhere, for Liu Cong gave a concubine of his, Consort Liu, to be the former Jin emperor's duchess.

Qing dynasty scholar Xue Fucheng said Empress Liang committed suicide in defence of her virtue.

== Notes ==
Chinese royalty
Preceded by Yang Xianrong	Empress of the Jin dynasty (266–420); 307–311	Succeeded by Empress Yu Wenjun
Preceded by Yang Xianrong	Empress of China (Southeastern); 307–311	Succeeded by Empress Yu Wenjun
Preceded by Yang Xianrong	Empress of China (Northern/Central); 307–311	Succeeded by Empress Huyan of Han Zhao
