= Yindi =

Yindi may refer to:

- Yothu Yindi, an Australian musical group.
- Emperor Yin (disambiguation) (隱帝; Yindi), a posthumous name for some Chinese emperors
