= Liu Can =

Emperor Yin of Han 漢隱帝

Emperor of Han-Zhao
- Reign: September 1, 318 – 318
- Predecessor: Liu Cong
- Successor: Jin Zhun
- Born: Unknown
- Died: September or October 318
- Spouse: Empress Jin
- Issue: Liu Yuangong
Names
- Family name: Liu (劉); Given name: Can (粲); Courtesy name: Shiguang (士光)
Era name and dates
- Hànchāng (漢昌): 318
Posthumous name
- Emperor Yin (隱皇帝)
- House: Liu
- Dynasty: Han-Zhao
- Father: Liu Cong
- Mother: Empress Huyan

Liu Can (died c.September 318), courtesy name Shiguang, also known by his posthumous name (as accorded by Jin Zhun) Emperor Yin of Han (Zhao), was an emperor of the Xiongnu-led Han-Zhao dynasty of China, who reigned briefly in September 318 before being killed by his trusted father-in-law Jin Zhun, who succeeded him to the Han-Zhao throne.

== As Prince of He'nei and then Prince of Jin ==
Liu Can was Liu Cong's son by his first wife, Empress Huyan, but was not created crown prince when Liu Cong became emperor in 310 after seizing the throne from his brother Liu He (after Liu He had tried to have him and the other brothers killed and successfully killed two), because Liu Cong had promised to and did make his brother Liu Ai (劉乂), the son of his father Liu Yuan's second wife Empress Dan, crown prince. Liu Can was, however, created the Prince of He'nei and given a substantial military command. He was one of Han's major generals early in Liu Cong's reign, along with his father's cousin Liu Yao the Prince of Shi'an, Wang Mi (王彌), and Shi Le. He appeared to be a competent general, although not as capable as Liu Yao or Shi Le, and he had mild successes in battle, although his campaigns were largely inconclusive. His mother Empress Huyan died in 312.

As the years went, Liu Cong became increasingly trusting of Liu Can, granting him more and more authority. Liu Can was considered, during his youth, to be capable in both governance and in military matters. However, after Liu Cong made him prime minister and created the Prince of Jin in 314, he was described to have become arrogant and abusive of his powers. He became close to flatterers, not willing to listen to honest advice, unkind, and busy with construction of palaces—all traits that his father Liu Cong had displayed as well (and which Liu Can himself had, ironically, advised his father against in 312). He became very trusting of his father-in-law Jin Zhun, who was treacherous.

While it might not have taken much encouragement for Liu Can to scheme against his uncle Crown Prince Ai anyway, in 316 Jin and his associate Guo Yi (郭漪) falsely told Liu Can that Crown Prince Ai was planning a rebellion, along with Liu Can's brothers Liu Fu (劉敷) and Liu Mai (劉勱). Liu Can believed them, particularly after they produced false evidence that convinced Liu Cong as well.

In spring 317, Liu Can finally readied his plan to eliminate his uncle Crown Prince Ai. He falsely informed Crown Prince Ai that Pingyang was under attack and that his subordinates should arm themselves to prepare for the attack. Then, Liu Can informed his father that Crown Prince Ai was ready to attack—and when Liu Cong's messengers then saw Crown Prince's associates armed, they believed Liu Can's accusations and reported back to Liu Cong. Liu Can then further interrogated Crown Prince Ai's subordinate Di and Qiang chiefs (whom Crown Prince Ai commanded, based on his secondary title of Grand Chanyu) under torture, and the Di and Qiang chiefs were forced to falsely confess to a plot. Crown Prince Ai's associates and troops were all massacred—estimated at the cost of 15,000 men—and Crown Prince Ai was deposed and subsequently assassinated by Jin. When Di and Qiang tribes subsequently revolted due to the treatment of their chiefs, Liu Cong sent Jin to suppress them, and Jin was successful. In fall 317, Liu Cong created Liu Can crown prince.

== Reign ==
Liu Cong died in summer 318, and Liu Can ascended the throne. He created his wife, Crown Princess Jin, empress, and his son Liu Yuangong (劉元公) crown prince. He became sorely reliant on his father-in-law Jin Zhun, trusting him over all others, including his brothers. He also indulged in affairs with his father's four empresses—Jin Zhun's daughter Jin Yuehua (靳月華) and Empresses Fan, Xuan, and Wang, leaving all affairs of state to Jin. At Jin's suggestion, he arrested and executed his brothers Liu Ji (劉驥), Liu Cheng (劉逞), Liu Mai, along with key officials Liu Jing (劉景) and Liu Yi (劉顗). He further considered attacking the domain of the general Shi Le, who controlled the eastern realm, believing Shi to be treasonous. Meanwhile, after Liu Can killed those high-level officials, the trusted Jin started a coup and killed Liu Can, and then massacred the imperial Liu clan. Liu Yao would claim the Han (Zhao) throne (Heaven King of Han), but Han (Zhao) would not be what it was after Liu Can's death.

== Personal information ==
- Father
  - Liu Cong (Emperor Zhaowu)
- Mother
  - Empress Huyan
- Wife
  - Empress Jin (created 318)
- Children
  - Liu Yuangong (劉元公), the Crown Prince (created 318)

Emperor Yin of Han (Zhao) House of Liu Died: 318
Regnal titles
Preceded by Liu Cong	Emperor of Han-Zhao; 318	Succeeded by Liu Yao
Titles in pretence
Preceded by Liu Cong	— TITULAR — Empire of China; Royal descent claimant 318; Reason for succession failure: Sixteen Kingdoms	Succeeded by Liu Yao
