= Empress Zhang =

Empress Zhang may refer to:

- Zhang Yan (empress), empress of Western Han (192 BC–188 BC)
- Empress Zhang (Liu Shan's first wife), empress of Shu Han (223–237)
- Empress Zhang (Liu Shan's second wife), empress of Shu Han (238–263)
- Empress Zhang (Cao Fang), empress of Cao Wei (252–254)
- Empress Zhang Huiguang, empress of Han-Zhao (313)
- Empress Zhang (Later Zhao), empress of Later Zhao (349)
- Empress Zhang (Later Qin), empress of Later Qin (402)
- Empress Zhang (Liang dynasty), empress of Liang dynasty (551)
- Empress Zhang Yao'er, empress of Chen dynasty (557–559)
- Empress Zhang (Tang dynasty), empress of the Tang dynasty (758–762)
- Empress Zhang (Later Liang), empress of Later Liang dynasty (912–913)
- Empress Zhang (Wang Yanzheng), empress of Yin/Min (943–945)
- Empress Zhang (Hongxi), empress of the Ming dynasty (1379–1442)
- Empress Zhang (Hongzhi), empress of the Ming dynasty (1471–1541)
- Empress Zhang (Jiajing), empress of the Ming dynasty (died 1537)
- Empress Zhang Baozhu, empress of the Ming dynasty (1606–1644)

== See also ==
- Empress Dowager Zhang (disambiguation)
