= Empress Dowager Zhang =

Empress Dowager Zhang (張太后) may refer to:

- Empress Dowager Zhang (Han-Zhao) (died 313), empress dowager of the Han Zhao dynasty
- Empress Dowager Zhang (Liu Song dynasty) (died 426), empress dowager of the Liu Song dynasty
- Empress Zhang (Hongxi) (1379–1442), empress dowager of the Ming dynasty
- Empress Zhang (Hongzhi) (1471–1541), empress dowager of the Ming dynasty

== See also ==
- Empress Zhang (disambiguation)
