= Empress Wuyuan =

Empress Wuyuan may refer to:

- Empress Yang Yan (238–274), wife of Emperor Wu of Jin
- Empress Huyan (Liu Cong's wife) (died 312), empress of Han-Zhao
