= Chen Yuanda =

Han Zhao minister (died 316)

- 陳元達
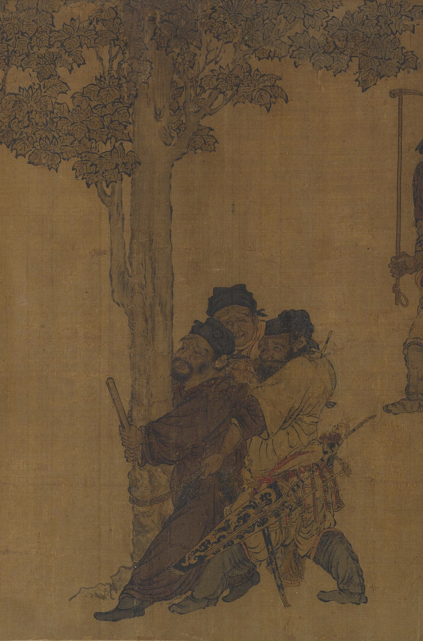
- Depiction of Chen Yuanda from "A Chained Remonstration" (鎖諫圖), attributed to the Tang dynasty painter, Yan Liben.

Imperial Secretary (御史大夫)
- In office 315–316
- Monarch: Liu Cong

Personal details
- Born: c.early 260s
- Died: 316
- Original name: Gao Yuanda (高元達)

Chen Yuanda (died c.April 316), courtesy name Changhong, was a Xiongnu minister of Han-Zhao during the Sixteen Kingdoms period. He was an influential figure within the Han court, most known for his fierce remonstrations against the emperor, Liu Cong and his decadent lifestyle. Towards the end of his life, he led the scholar-officials in a power struggle against Liu Cong's eunuchs and consort kins, but killed himself out of despair after his close friend died as a result of the conflict.

== Early life and service under Liu Yuan ==
Chen Yuanda was born into the Rear Division of the Southern Xiongnu. His family name was originally "Gao (高)", but supposedly, due to his birth month bringing misfortune to his father, he was forced to change it to "Chen (陳)". Yuanda was orphaned at an early age and grew up poor in Jinyang. He took a liking to reciting books and worked on farms to sustain himself. Yuanda was knowledgeable, but never received an invitation to serve from anyone of note until he was 40.

When Liu Yuan became the Xiongnu Worthy Prince of the Left, he sought out to recruit Yuanda into his ranks. However, Yuanda ignored his call and sent no reply. Liu Yuan broke away from the Jin dynasty in 304, declaring himself King of Han. It was around this time when someone asked Yuanda if he was worried now that Liu Yuan was king. Yuanda replied, "I know him well, and he also understands my thoughts. Within two or three days, the letter will arrive." Surely enough, Liu Yuan approached him again, offering him the position of Gentleman of the Yellow Gates. This time, Yuanda accepted his offer.

Liu Yuan told him that had he came earlier, Yuanda would have had a higher position than what he had now. Yuanda replied, "The ministers are divided by nature, and those who are rash for power will surely fall. If I had joined earlier, I fear that you may elect me as one of the Nine Ministers or as a Receiver of Words. This is not the division of ministers. How can a minister be worthy of such treatment! So suppress these emotions, and wait for that division to come. The king would have no slander, and the ministers would be free from the calamity of the outsiders." Liu Yuan was pleased by his response.

Under Liu Yuan, Yuanda was a described as a loyal and trusted minister. He often gave advice to Liu Yuan and submitted private petitions that not even Liu Yuan's children knew the content of.

== Service under Liu Cong ==
=== Construction of Huangyi Hall ===
Liu Yuan died in August 310 and was succeeded by Liu He, who was quickly assassinated and replaced through a coup by his brother, Liu Cong, that same year. Between 304 and 313, Yuanda grew to the position of Minister of Justice. In 313, Liu Cong made his Honoured Lady, Liu E his empress. To honour her, Liu Cong built Huangyi Hall. Yuanda reprimanded Liu Cong for this, as Cong had already carried out many projects in the past. He said that now that Han was on the verge of replacing the Jin dynasty in the north, Liu Cong should present himself more frugally to the people and concentrate on spending the treasury on expelling the remaining Jin remnants. Liu Cong was insulted by Yuanda's rebuking, and ordered him to be executed.

As Chen Yuanda was brought out for his execution, he passed through Xiaoyao Garden in Lizhong Court, another one of Liu Cong's courts. He was being led under the trees of the court's garden when somehow, Yuanda chained himself to one of the trees with the chains around his hands. The attendants tried to free him, but Yuanda refused to let them do so. As Yuanda delayed his execution, many of Liu Cong's ministers pleaded his innocence to Liu Cong to prevent his execution. Liu Cong made no response but soon enough, Liu E took notice of the situation. Liu E submitted to her husband a petition asking him to spare Yuanda from death.

With both his ministers and wife siding with Yuanda, Cong eventually pardoned him. Upon meeting Yuanda, he said, "You ought to be the one fearing me, but right now it's me who is fearing you!" The two men reconciled, and Liu Cong even went as far as renaming Xiaoyao Garden to Naxian Garden (Accepting the Virtuous Garden) and Lizhong Court to Kuixian Court (Shamed by the Virtuous Court) due to the incident.

=== Issue with Liu Cong's empresses ===
In a story that supposedly took place in 313, a shooting star had fallen to the ground around Pingyang and transformed into a mass of flesh. Liu Cong was disturbed by the event and asked his ministers their opinion on what this meant. Yuanda told him, "Women are being shown too much favour; this is an omen of the downfall of the state." Liu Cong replied, "What you say is purely based on yin and yang. How does this relate to human affairs?" Coincidentally, shortly after the incident, Liu E would die.

In 315, Liu Cong made the controversial decision of having three empresses at once, them being Liu Guifei, Jin Yueguang and Jin Yuehua. Yuanda once again argued with him, telling him that it was against tradition to have more than one empress. Liu Cong was annoyed by his admonition, so he secretly reduced Yuanda's power by moving him to a prestigious but also powerless position. However, many ministers protested this move by offering to give their positions up to Yuanda, so Cong was forced to re-appoint him as Imperial Secretary. Later, Jin Yueguang was caught committing an immoral act, so Yuanda sent a petition to Liu Cong in regard to it and forced him to depose her. After her removal, Yueguang killed herself out of shame. Cong was distraught by her death, and blamed Yuanda for causing it.

=== Conflict with Wang Chen and death ===
During 316, Liu Cong began to place an excessive amount of trust in his eunuchs and consort kins, led by Wang Chen. Wang Chen and his allies were despised by Liu Cong's minister as they continued to curry his favour while living lavishly and removing their rivals. Yuanda was involved in a group effort to submit a petition denouncing Wang Chen and his partisans. However, Liu Cong's trust in Wang Chen was entrenched, and Cong dismissed their attempts to win him over again.

As the political dispute continued that year, one of Yuanda's closest friends, Liu Yi, died shortly after Liu Cong had denied his petition. Liu Yi's death greatly affected Yuanda, who became depressed as a result. Shortly after his friend's death, Yuanda returned to his home, where he committed suicide. Many of the ministers mourned their deaths, and felt that the two men had been unfairly treated.
