= Jin Zhun =

Jin Zhun 靳準
- Emperor of Han-Zhao

Emperor of Han-Zhao
- Reign: 318
- Predecessor: Liu Can
- Successor: Liu Yao
- Died: c.January 319
Full name
- Family name: Jìn (靳); Given name: Zhǔn (準)
Regnal name
- Grand General, Heavenly King of Han (大將軍 漢天王)
- House: Jin
- Dynasty: Han-Zhao (by usurpation)

Jin Zhun (Chinese: 靳準; died c.January 319) was an official and a member of the consort kin of the Xiongnu-led Han-Zhao dynasty of China who briefly usurped the throne in 318. Jin Zhun staged a coup d'état against the Han emperor and his son-in-law Liu Can (Emperor Yin) and then massacred the Liu imperial family. He then proclaimed himself Heavenly King of Han and nominally submitted to the Eastern Jin dynasty as a vassal. His forces were subsequently squeezed in by the troops led by Liu Yao and Shi Le, and, facing probable defeat, his followers assassinated him. Liu Yao then succeeded Jin Zhun to the Han throne. Jin Zhun was probably an ethnic Xiongnu, although some sources claim that he was of Han descent.

== During Liu Cong's reign ==
The first reference to Jin Zhun in history was in 315, when he was mentioned as a minor Han general, whose two beautiful daughters Jin Yueguang and Jin Yuehua were taken by the Han emperor Liu Cong (Emperor Zhaowu) as consorts. Liu Cong, who was then starting the highly unorthodox practice of creating multiple empresses, creating Jin Yueguang as "Upper Empress" and Jin Yuehua as "Right Empress." That same year, Upper Empress Jin was revealed by the official Chen Yuanda as having committed adultery, causing Liu Cong to feel compelled to depose her. Ashamed, she committed suicide.

It was also mentioned that another daughter of Jin Zhun married Liu Cong's son, Liu Can, but the year is unknown. As years went by, Jin Zhun became closely associated with the Liu Can and several eunuchs and servants trusted by Liu Cong and Liu Can, including Wang Chen (王沈), Xuan Huai (宣懷), and Guo Yi (郭漪). Jin and Guo were instrumental in persuading Liu Can that his uncle, Liu Ai (劉乂) the crown prince was conspiring against him and his father, and subsequently participated heavily in Liu Can's plot to have his uncle falsely accused of treason and removed as crown prince in 317. Jin also assassinated the former Crown Prince Ai, on Liu Can's orders. Liu Can became crown prince, and Princess Jin became crown princess.

== Coup against Liu Can ==
After Liu Cong died in summer 318, Liu Can succeeded to the throne, and proceeded to spend day and night committing adultery with his father's four surviving empresses—one of which was Jin Zhun's daughter Jin Yuehua. Jin hatched a plan to overthrow Liu Can, and managed to persuade Liu Can, with the help of his two daughters (Empress Dowager Jin and Empress Jin) that several imperial princes and high-level officials were conspiring against him. With Liu Can's approval, those imperial princes and high-level officials were executed. Jin Zhun became in control of government, and, after putting his cousins Jin Ming (靳明) and Jin Kang (靳康) in command of the armies, carried out a coup against Liu Can, capturing and executing him. He then massacred all members of the imperial Liu clan whom he could capture—regardless of gender or age. He also dug up the graves of Liu Cong and the founding emperor, Liu Yuan, and burned the Han imperial temple.

== After the coup ==
Jin claimed for himself the titles of supreme commander and (historical sources are in conflict) either "heavenly king" (天王) or "great king" (大王) of Han. He acted in the role of an emperor, and he sent messengers to Emperor Yuan of Jin, claiming that he was about to revert to the Jin dynasty's rule. The Jin emperor believed him, and sent out an army to try to support him.

Before that Jin army could come close to arriving, however, Jin Zhun was caught in a trap. The major Han generals Liu Yao, the Prince of Qin, who controlled the Chang'an region, and Shi Le, who controlled the eastern empire, both moved their troops against him. Shi Le, whose headquarters were closer at Xiangguo, quickly arrived near the capital Pingyang (平陽, in modern Linfen, Shanxi), but chose to not engage Jin Zhun immediately. In winter 318, Liu Yao, a cousin of Liu Cong, declared himself emperor, and advanced on Pingyang as well. Jin was caught between Liu Yao's and Shi's forces.

Jin sent imperial garments and wagons to Shi, seeking peace. Shi, however, sent those, along with Jin's messenger, over to Liu Yao. Liu Yao claimed that he admired Jin for carrying out the coup that allowed him to be emperor, because the government had become so corrupt late in Liu Cong's and in Liu Can's reigns, and offered not only to spare his life but to continue to allow him to be an important official. Jin, however, distrusted Liu Yao's offer, because he had killed Liu Yao's mother and brother in the massacre. However, as he hesitated, he was assassinated by cousins Jin Ming (靳明) and Jin Kang (靳康), Qiao Tai (喬泰), and Wang Teng (王騰), who then surrendered to Liu Yao, who then massacred the Jin clan.
