= Empress Guangxian =

Empress Guangxian may refer to:

- Empress Dowager Zhang (Former Zhao), empress dowager of Han Zhao
- Börte, wife of Genghis Khan of the Mongol Empire
