= Emperor Yin =

Emperor Yin (隱帝, Yindi) may refer to:

- Liu Can (died 318), Emperor Yin of Han Zhao
- Liu Chengyou (931–951), Emperor Yin of Later Han
