= Empress Jin (Yin) =

Empress Jin (Chinese: 靳皇后, personal name unknown) was briefly an empress of the Xiongnu-led Chinese Han-Zhao dynasty. Her husband was Liu Can (Emperor Yin).

She was Jin Zhun's daughter. It is not known what year she married Liu Can, but when he served as his father Liu Cong (Emperor Zhaowu)'s crown prince, she was crown princess. In 318, after Liu Cong died, Liu Can became emperor and named her empress. He also named his son Liu Yuangong (劉元公), likely her son, crown prince.

Jin Zhun, however, planned to overthrow Liu Can. He advised Liu Can to kill a number of his brothers and high-level officials under suspicion of treason, and when Liu Can initially would not, Empress Jin and her sister Jin Yuehua the empress dowager persuaded him that Jin Zhun was telling the truth. After those high-level officials were killed, Jin then killed Liu Can and massacred the imperial Liu clan. Later that year, Jin was assassinated and succeeded by his cousin Jin Ming (靳明), who, along with the rest of the Jin clan, were slaughtered by the succeeding emperor Liu Yao. It is not known what Empress Jin's fate was.

Chinese royalty
Preceded by Liu Cong's later empresses	Empress of Han-Zhao; 318	Succeeded by Yang Xianrong
