= Empress Huyan (Liu Cong's wife) =

Empress Huyan (呼延皇后, personal name unknown, died 312), formally Empress Wuyuan (武元皇后, literally "the martial and discerning empress") was an empress of the Xiongnu-led Han-Zhao dynasty of China. She was the first wife of Liu Cong (Emperor Zhaowu).

== Life ==
Her clan, the Huyans, were probably a noble clan of Xiongnu, as a large number of Han-Zhao officials were named Huyan. She was created empress in 310 after Liu Cong seized the throne from his brother Liu He (after Liu He tried to have him and his other brothers killed and successfully killed two). She was the cousin of Empress Huyan, the first empress of Liu Cong's father Liu Yuan. She bore Liu Cong at least one son – Liu Can, whom Liu Cong made Prince of He'nei and commissioned as a major general. However, he did not make Liu Can crown prince because he had promised to make Liu Ai, son of Liu Yuan's second wife Empress Shan, who had yielded the throne to him after Crown Prince Liu He's death. (He also had an affair with Empress Shan, and this affair was part of the reason.)

When Empress Dowager Shan died in 310, Empress Huyan began trying to secure the crown prince position for her son, telling him:

"You inherited the throne from your father. What does the Crown Prince have to do with it? After you die, Liu Can and his brothers will not even get to live."

Liu Cong did not follow her suggestion at this point, but the seeds were sown, and in 317, long after her death, he deposed Crown Prince Ai and made Liu Can crown prince.

Empress Huyan died in 312 and was given a posthumous name, appropriate for an empress.

Chinese royalty
Preceded by Empress Dan	Empress of Han-Zhao; 310–312	Succeeded by Empress Zhang Huiguang
Preceded by Empress Dan	Empress of China (Southern Shanxi); 310–312	Succeeded by Empress Zhang Huiguang
Preceded by Empress Liang Lanbi of Jin	Empress of China (Northern/Central); 311–312	Succeeded by Empress Zhang Huiguang
