= 284 =

284 in various calendars
Gregorian calendar	284; CCLXXXIV
Ab urbe condita	1037
Assyrian calendar	5034
Balinese saka calendar	205–206
Bengali calendar	−310 – −309
Berber calendar	1234
Buddhist calendar	828
Burmese calendar	−354
Byzantine calendar	5792–5793
Chinese calendar	癸卯年 (Water Rabbit); 2981 or 2774 — to — 甲辰年 (Wood Dragon); 2982 or 2775
Coptic calendar	0–1
Discordian calendar	1450
Ethiopian calendar	276–277
Hebrew calendar	4044–4045
- Hindu calendars
Vikram Samvat	340–341
Shaka Samvat	205–206
Kali Yuga	3384–3385
Holocene calendar	10284
Iranian calendar	338 BP – 337 BP
Islamic calendar	348 BH – 347 BH
Javanese calendar	163–165
Julian calendar	284; CCLXXXIV
Korean calendar	2617
Minguo calendar	1628 before ROC 民前1628年
Nanakshahi calendar	−1184
Seleucid era	595/596 AG
Thai solar calendar	826–827
Tibetan calendar	ཆུ་མོ་ཡོས་ལོ་ (female Water-Hare); 410 or 29 or −743 — to — ཤིང་ཕོ་འབྲུག་ལོ་ (male Wood-Dragon); 411 or 30 or −742

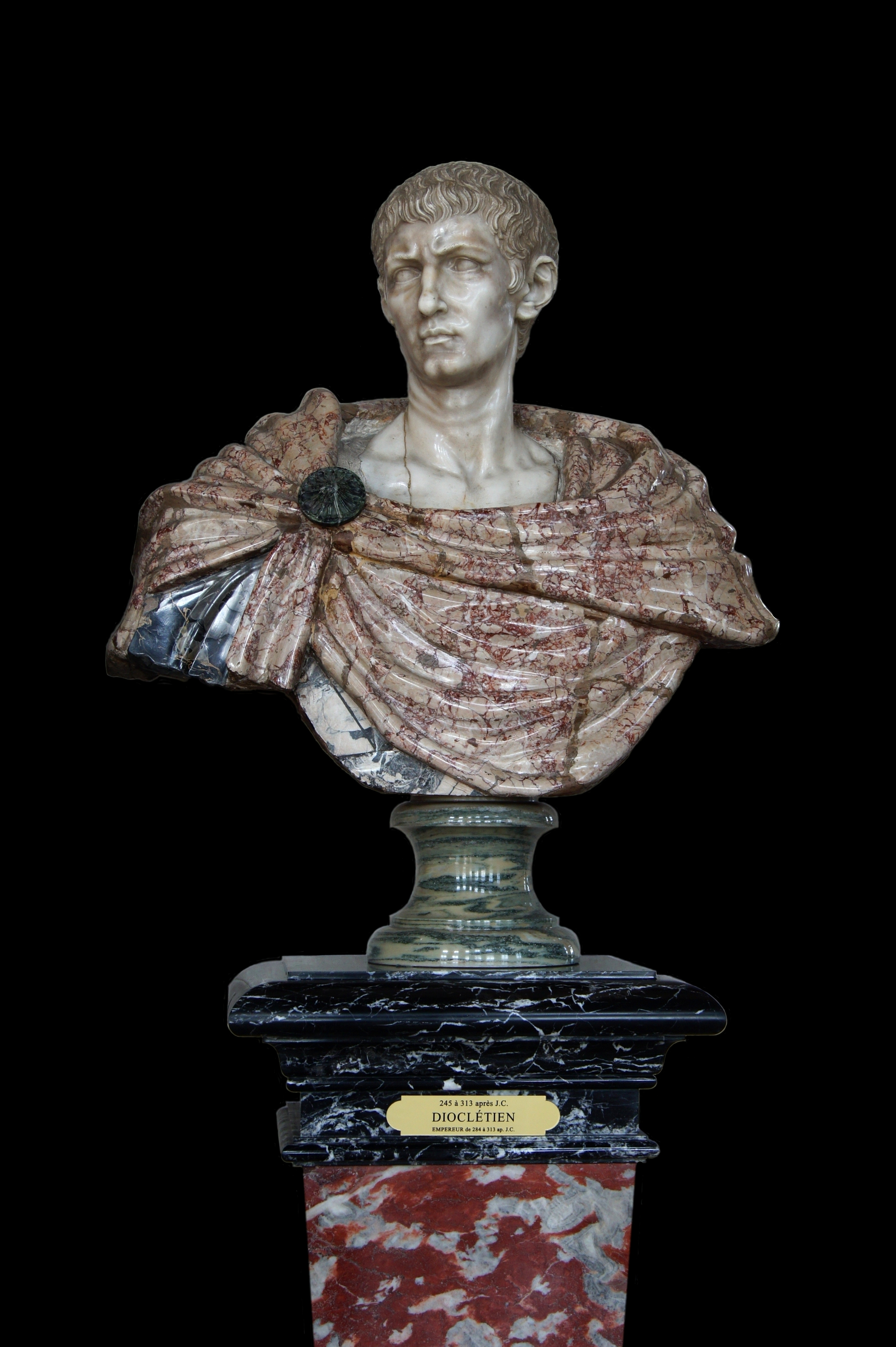
Emperor Diocletian

Year 284 (CCLXXXIV) was a leap year starting on Tuesday of the Julian calendar. At the time, it was known as the Year of the Consulship of Carinus and Numerianus (or, less frequently, year 1037 Ab urbe condita). The denomination 284 for this year has been used since the early medieval period, when the Anno Domini calendar era became the prevalent method in Europe for naming years.

== Events ==
=== By place ===
==== Roman Empire ====
- Emperor Numerian travels through Bithynia (Asia Minor) on his way home to Rome. Suffering from an inflammation of the eyes, he travels in a closed litter in which soldiers find his decaying corpse.
- November 17 – Diocletian becomes emperor of Rome
- November 20 – The commander of Numerian's domestici (household troops), Diocles, is chosen to be the new emperor. In a military assembly outside Nicomedia (modern İzmit, Turkey), Diocles claims that the praetorian prefect (and rival for the throne) Arrius Aper murdered Numerian, and he personally stabs and kills the prefect on the spot. The new emperor changes his name to the Latinised 'Diocletian'. Building on existing trends, Diocletian presents his rule as that of a god-like dominus or autocrat.
- Sabinus Julianus, the praetorian prefect of Emperor Carinus, exploits the instability and usurps the throne in northern Italy.

==== Persian Empire ====
- King of Kings Bahram II installs Mirian III, of the House of Mihran, on the throne of the Kingdom of Iberia. Mirian would rule the kingdom until his death in c. 361.

==== Korea ====
- Yurye becomes king of the Korean kingdom of Silla.

=== By topic ===
==== Religion ====
- Rufinus succeeds Dometius as Bishop of Byzantium.

== Births ==
- Fu Hong (or Pu Hong), Chinese general and prince (d. 350)
- Huai of Jin, Chinese emperor of the Jin Dynasty (d. 313)

== Deaths ==
- November 20 – Numerian, Roman emperor (b. 254)
- Lucius Flavius Aper, Roman general and praetorian prefect
- Sun Hao, Chinese emperor of the Eastern Wu state (b. 243)
