= Empress Shan =

Chinese empress

Empress Shan 單皇后
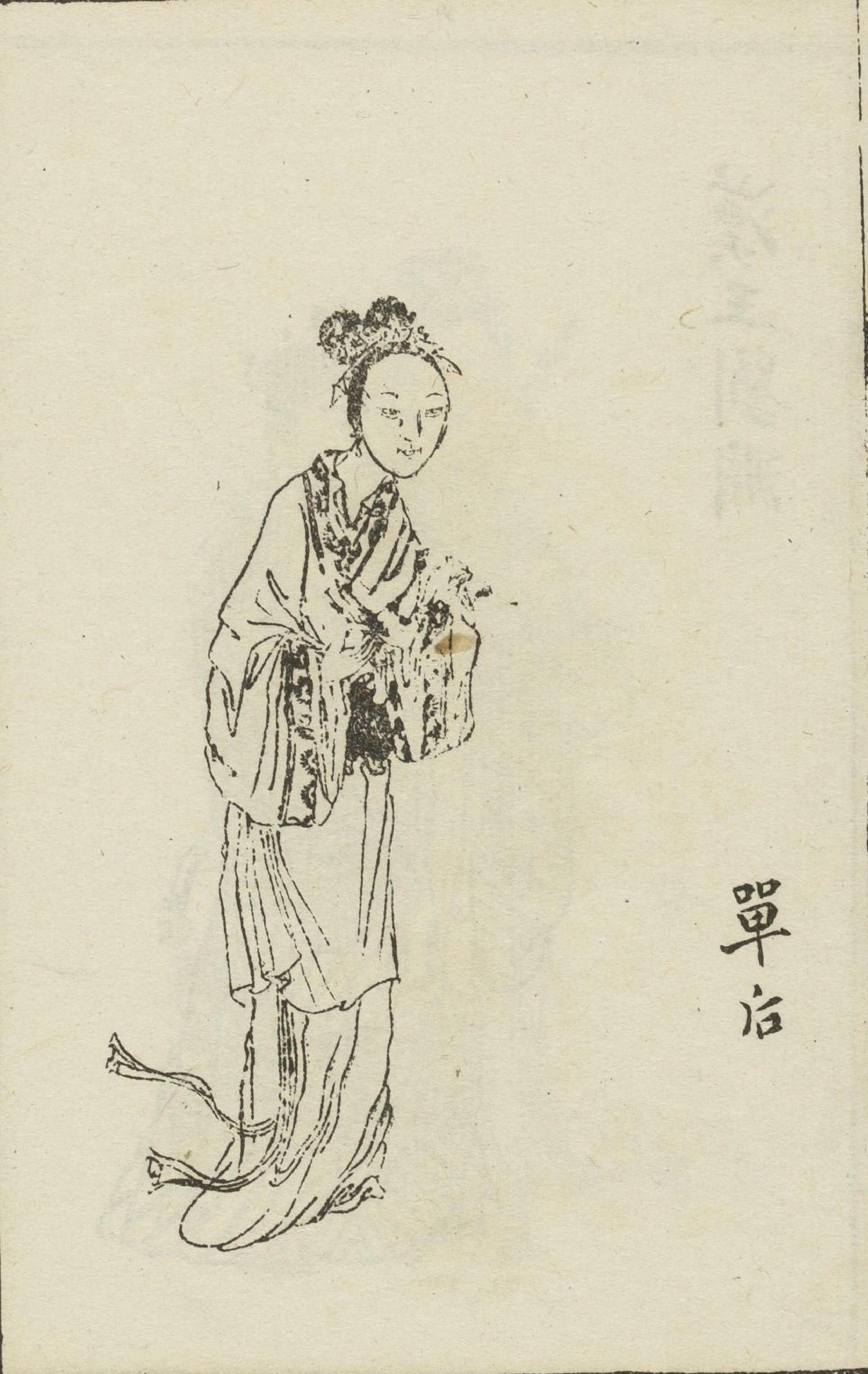
- Spouse: Liu Yuan
- Dynasty: Han-Zhao

Empress Shan (Chinese: 單皇后; personal name unknown; died 310) was an ethnic Di empress consort of the Xiongnu-led Chinese Han-Zhao dynasty. She was the second wife of the founding emperor Liu Yuan (Emperor Guangwen). Her name can be rendered as Empress Dan.

== Biography ==
Empress Shan's father Shan Zheng was a Di chieftain, who submitted to Han-Zhao in 308. It is not known when she married Liu Yuan, but he made her his wife and empress in early 310, while also creating his son Liu He, by his first wife Empress Huyan, crown prince. However, Empress Shan's son Liu Ai, while described as "young" in 310, was already capable of independent thinking, implying that he was an older child or young adult by that time. Liu Yuan died later that year and was succeeded by Liu He, who was however overthrown and killed by Liu Cong – another son of Liu Yuan, born to Consort Zhang – after a week as emperor. Liu Cong initially offered the throne to Liu Ai, but Liu Ai declined, and Liu Cong took the throne himself. He honored Empress Shan as empress dowager and named her son Liu Ai crown prince.

Empress Dowager Shan was described as still young and beautiful at that point, and she carried on an affair with Liu Cong, which was considered incest in Han culture. Crown Prince Ai became aware of the affair and tried to persuade her to end it. Knowing that her son knew about the affair, she died late in 310, described as having died "of her shame," implying that she might have committed suicide.

Chinese royalty
Preceded by Empress Huyan (Liu Yuan's wife)	Empress of Han-Zhao; 310	Succeeded by Empress Huyan (Liu Cong's wife)
