= Empress Dowager Zhang (Han-Zhao) =

Chinese empress dowager

Empress Dowager Zhang (Chinese: 張太后, personal name unknown; died 313), formally Empress Guangxian (Chinese: 光獻皇后, literally "the rebuilding and wise empress"), was an empress dowager of the Xiongnu-led Han-Zhao dynasty of China, during the reign of her son Liu Cong (Emperor Zhaowu).

She was the founding emperor Liu Yuan's concubine. Her son Liu Cong was Liu Yuan's fourth son, and it is not known if she bore other children for Liu Yuan. When Liu Cong seized the throne in 310 after overthrowing his older brother Liu He (after Liu He had tried to have him and the other brothers killed and successfully killed two), he honored both her and Liu Yuan's wife, Empress Shan, empresses dowager – Empress Shan with the greater title of Huangtaihou (皇太后) and her with the lesser title of Ditaihou (帝太后). When Empress Dowager Shan died later that year, she received the greater title of Huangtaihou.

She was known only for a few incidents during her time as empress dowager. In 312, at her insistence, Liu Cong took two daughters of his cousin Zhang Shi as his concubines. Later that year, when Liu Cong was wrongly punishing the official Wang Zhang for trying to persuade him to be milder in his temper and actions, Empress Dowager Zhang protested by fasting for three days, eventually helping to correct Liu Cong's behavior for a time. Later that year, when Liu Cong was set to create his concubine Liu Ying as empress, Empress Zhang insisted against it and for her grandniece Zhang Huiguang, whom Liu Cong then formally created empress in early 313. Three months later, Empress Dowager Zhang died and was honored with a posthumous empress title. Her grandniece, the empress, mourned her so greatly and was so depressed that she died as well.
