= Candidianus (son of Galerius) =

Son of Emperor Galerius

Candidianus (c. 296–313) was the son of the Roman Emperor Galerius and adoptive son of Galeria Valeria, the wife of Galerius and daughter of Diocletian and Prisca.

== Life and execution ==
Candidianus was the son of Galerius and a mistress whose name has not been recorded. He was later adopted by Galerius's legitimate wife, Galeria Valeria, who had no children of her own. Lactantius records that Galerius intended to make Candidianus a Caesar, or junior emperor, upon the celebration of his vicennalia in 312. However, Galerius perished in 311 while preparations for the celebration were underway and was succeeded by Maximinus Daza and Licinius.

Along with Severianus, son of the deceased emperor Severus II, Candidianus feared the intentions of Licinius and fled to the court of Maximinus Daza where he resided until 313. It was probably about this time that young Candidianus was betrothed to the daughter of Daza who was seven years old at the time.

Candidianus was captured in 313, after Licinius killed Daza in a civil war. According to Lactantius, Candidianus presented himself at the court of Licinius and was received with honor. However, as soon as the youth felt himself safe, Licinius had him executed. His unnamed betrothed and her brother, Maximus, also lost their lives.

== Sources ==
- Lactantius. Lord Hailes (transl.) (2021) On the Deaths of the Persecutors: A Translation of De Mortibus Persecutorum by Lucius Cæcilius Firmianus Lactantius Evolution Publishing, Merchantville, NJ ISBN 978-1-935228-20-2, p. 91
- Mackay, Christopher S. “Lactantius and the Succession to Diocletian.” Classical Philology, vol. 94, no. 2, 1999, pp. 198–209. JSTOR. Accessed 15 May 2021.
- Leadbetter, William Lewis. Galerius and the Will of Diocletian. United Kingdom, Taylor & Francis, 2009.
