= Zhang Huiguang =

Chinese Empress

Zhang Huiguang (Chinese: 張徽光); died 313), formally Empress Wuxiao (Chinese: 武孝皇后, literally "the martial and filial empress"), was an empress of the Xiongnu-led Chinese Han-Zhao dynasty. She was Liu Cong (Emperor Zhaowu)'s second wife.

Zhang Huiguang was the daughter of Zhang Shi, the nephew of Liu Cong's mother Empress Dowager Zhang. In 312, at Empress Dowager Zhang's insistence, Liu Cong took Zhang Huiguang and her sister to be his concubines. Later that year, he wanted to make another concubine, Liu Ying, empress, but Empress Zhang insisted that he make Zhang Huiguang empress. He did so in early 313. Three months later, Empress Dowager Zhang died. Empress Zhang mourned her so greatly and was so depressed that she died as well.

Chinese royalty
Preceded by Empress Huyan	Empress of Han-Zhao; 313	Succeeded by Empress Liu E
