= Flavius Severianus =

Son of Roman emperor Severus

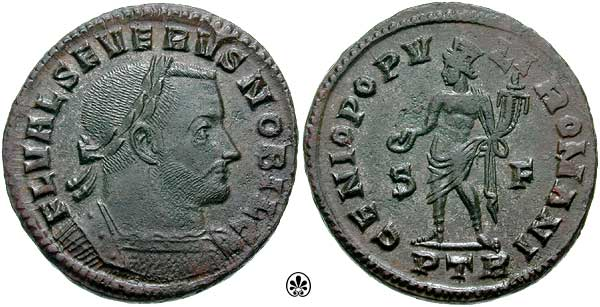
coin featuring Flavius Severianus' side profile

Flavius Severianus (died 313) was the son of the Roman Emperor Flavius Valerius Severus.

Practically all we know about Flavius Severianus comes from Lactantius.

== Biography ==
After his father died in 307 in Italy having surrendered to his rivals Maximian and Maxentius, Severus' young son, Flavius Severianus, sought refuge in the Eastern part of the empire under Galerius. When Galerius died in 311, Severianus suspected Licinius intended to harm him as a potential rival in his ambitions to rule the East and so he fled to Maximinus Daza in Asia who made him praeses (governor) of the province of Isauria.

In August 313, Maximinus Daza went to war against Licinius. Severianus accompanied him on this campaign which ended in defeat for Daza. Severianus was captured following the death of Daza, and Licinius had him executed under the pretense that Severianus intended to assume the imperial office himself.
