= Liu Yuan (Han-Zhao) =

Leader of Han-Zhao dynasty from 304 to 310

Emperor Guangwen of Han 漢光文帝
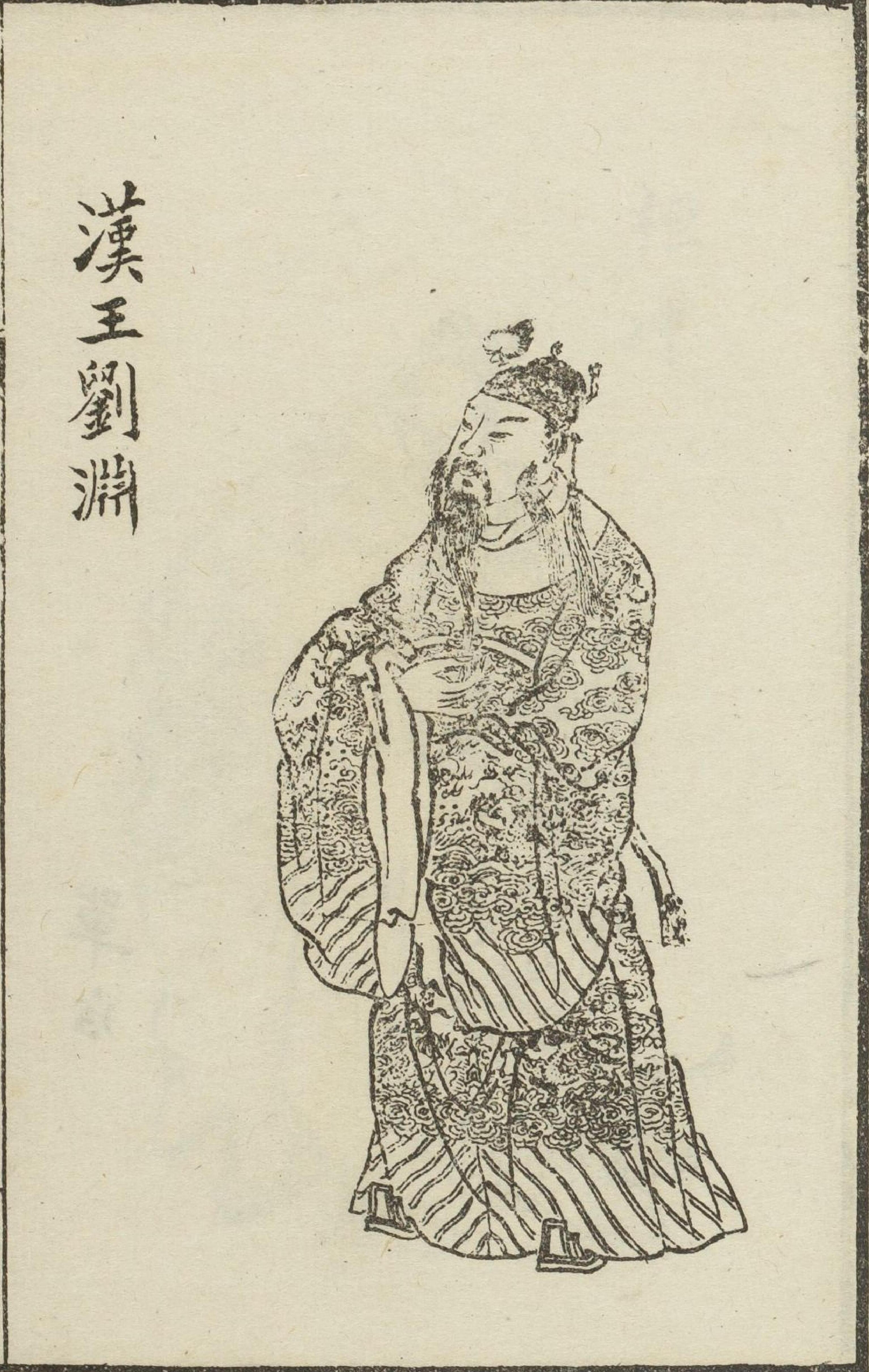

Emperor of Han-Zhao
- Reign: 2 November 308 (Note: jiaxu day of the 10th month of the 2nd year of the Yongjia era, per vol.86 of Zizhi Tongjian. In 304, Liu Yuan took on the title of "King of Han".) – 29 August 310
- Successor: Liu He
- Born: 252 or 253
- Died: 29 August 310 (aged around 58–59)
- Burial: Yongguang Mausoleum (永光陵)
- Spouse: Empress Huyan; Empress Dan; Consort Zhang
- Issue: see #Family
Names
- Family name: Liu (劉); Given name: Yuan (淵); Courtesy name: Yuanhai (元海)
Era dates
- Yuánxī (元熙): 304–308; Yǒngfèng (永鳳): 308–309; Héruì (河瑞): 309–310
Regnal name
- Grand Chanyu (大單于, 304); King of Han (漢王, 304–308); Emperor (since 308) (Note: These were titles Liu Yuan gave himself.)
Posthumous name
- Emperor Guangwen (光文皇帝)
Temple name
- Gaozu (高祖)
- House: Liu
- Dynasty: Han-Zhao
- Father: Liu Bao
- Mother: Lady Huyan

Liu Yuan (劉淵, 252/253 (Note: According to the Book of Jin, Lady Huyan had prayed for a son during the Jiaping Era (249–254) and gave birth to Liu Yuan thirteen months later. Lady Huyan died when Liu Yuan was seven years old (East Asian age reckoning), and it was said that the Minister of Works, Wang Chang sent his condolences to him. Wang Chang served as Minister of Works from 258 until his death in 259, which means that Liu Yuan may have been born sometime between 252 and 253.) – 29 August 310 (Note: jimao day of the 7th month of the 4th year of the Yong'jia era, per vol.87 of Zizhi Tongjian)), courtesy name Yuanhai (元海), also known by his posthumous name as the Emperor Guangwen of Han (Zhao) (漢(趙)光文帝) was the founding emperor of the Xiongnu-led Han-Zhao dynasty of China during the Sixteen Kingdoms period. Due to Tang dynasty naming taboo, he is referred to by his courtesy name as Liu Yuanhai (劉元海) in the Book of Jin. (Note: Liu Yuan (劉淵) shares the same given name as Emperor Gaozu of Tang, whose name is Li Yuan (李淵).)

Liu Yuan was born into the aristocracy of the Five Divisions and was sent to the Chinese capital, Luoyang as a hostage during his youth, where he became highly sinicized and later held several government offices under the Western Jin dynasty. As the War of the Eight Princes weakened Jin authority in northern China, Liu Yuan was called upon by the Five Divisions to lead their rebellion, and in late 304, (Note: Sima Guang noted that when Li Xiong and Liu Yuan declared themselves independent from Jin in 304 differed across various sources. Emperor Hui's biography in Book of Jin dated this event to the 11th month of that year (corresponding to 14 Dec 304 to 11 Jan 305 in the Julian calendar), after Emperor Hui had entered Chang'an; the Chronicles of Huayang recorded that Li Xiong declared independence in the 10th month (14 Nov to 13 Dec 304), with one version dating the event to the 12th month (12 Jan to 10 Feb 305) instead. The Zizhi Tongjian followed the Sanshi Guo Chunqiu, Shiliuguo Chunqiu and Jin Chunqiu in dating Li Xiong and Liu Yuan declaring themselves independent to the 10th month.) he declared independence from the Jin and founded the Han-Zhao dynasty, one of the first of the Sixteen Kingdoms. His declaration, along with the founding of the Cheng-Han dynasty by Li Xiong in Sichuan that same year, marked the formal end of the Western Jin's brief unification of China following the Three Kingdoms period.

His state of Han (renamed Zhao in 319) was initially depicted as a restoration of the Han dynasty; (Note: When declaring himself King of Han, Liu Yuan styled himself as a maternal nephew and younger brother of the Han emperors.) as more anti-Jin rebellions sprang up, Liu Yuan soon found himself leading a coalition of Han Chinese and ethnic minority rebels in northern China. Though he would not live to see it, his family and generals would eventually drive the Jin out of the north.

== Family background ==
According to official history, Liu Yuan was a member of the Luandi clan, a ruling nobility of the Xiongnu who changed their surname to Liu (劉). They are descendants of the first great chanyu in Xiongnu history, Modu Chanyu, who agreed to a détente with the Han dynasty through the practice of heqin. The Xiongnu were greatly weakened during the reign of Emperor Wu of Han, and they progressively lost their influence during the Eastern Han and its successor states Cao Wei and Jin.

In late Wei or early Jin times, the Southern Xiongnu nobles claimed that they also descended from the Han dynasty's ruling Liu clan — through a princess who had married Modu Chanyu – and therefore changed their family name to Liu. Liu Yuan's father, Liu Bao, was the son of one of the last Southern Xiongnu chanyus, Yufuluo, and the nephew of the last Southern Xiongnu chanyu Huchuquan.

With the dissolution of the Southern Xiongnu in 216, Cao Cao abolished the chanyu's title and divided the Southern Xiongnu into Five Divisions (五部) in Bing province around modern-day Shanxi. Liu Bao had the command of the Left Tribe (左部). Liu Yuan's mother Lady Huyan appeared to be from a noble family, and was in probability Liu Bao's wife, rather than a concubine. As the Five Divisions settled down in Bingzhou (Note: modern southern Shanxi), that was likely where Liu Yuan was born and raised.

== As a Jin subject ==
As powerful nobles from the Five Divisions were usually encouraged or pressured by Cao Wei and Jin authorities to send their sons to the capital Luoyang (Note: This was to encourage further sinicization, and to provide collateral for their loyalty.), Liu Yuan was sent to Luoyang to reside and to study traditional Chinese literature. He became well known for his studies, particularly of the Zou version of Confucius' Spring and Autumn Annals and of the military strategies of Sun Tzu and Wu Qi. The key Jin official Wang Hun became impressed with him, and Wang Hun's son Wang Ji became a close friend of Liu Yuan's. Wang Hun believed Liu to be general material and repeatedly recommended Liu Yuan to Emperor Wu, but Kong Xun and Empress Yang Zhi's uncle Yang Ji suspected Liu for his Xiongnu ancestry and persuaded Emperor Wu against giving Liu military commands during campaigns against Eastern Wu and the Xianbei rebel Tufa Shujineng. Eventually, even Emperor Wu's brother Sima You the Prince of Qi, impressed and fearful of Liu's abilities, encouraged Emperor Wu to have Liu executed, but Wang Hun persuaded Emperor Wu that it would be wrong. When Liu Bao died in 279, Emperor Wu permitted Liu Yuan to take over command of the Left Tribe. In 289, he was transferred to Commander of the North Tribe.

As the commander of the tribes, Liu became known for his fair administration of laws and willingness to listen to ideas, and also for his willingness to spread his wealth. This led the ambitious people in his region, not only of the Five Divisions but of many Han clans, to flock to him. After Emperor Wu's death and succession by Emperor Hui, the regent Yang Jun made Liu the commander of the Five Divisions, but toward the end of the subsequent regency of Emperor Hui's wife, Empress Jia Nanfeng, Liu was removed from that position due to his inability to stop one of his countrymen's rebellions. Later, when Sima Ying the Prince of Chengdu became the military commander at Yecheng, he invited Liu to be one of his subordinate military commanders, and Liu accepted the invitation.

== Independence from Jin ==
In the midst of the War of the Eight Princes, in 304, the Five Divisions nobles, led by the commander of the North Tribe, Liu Xuan, who was tired of misrule by the Jin, secretly plotted independence. They sent a messenger to secretly offer Liu Yuan the title of Grand Chanyu. Liu Yuan told Sima Ying, who was concerned about an attack from Wang Jun, whose troops were reinforced with Xianbei and Wuhuan soldiers, that he would be willing to mobilize the soldiers of the Five Divisions to support Sima Ying's cause. Sima Ying agreed and allowed Liu Yuan to return to the Five Divisions.

Once Liu Yuan returned to his people, he gathered 50,000 men quickly and was readying himself to rush to Sima Ying's aid, but he also publicly accepted the title of Grand Chanyu. (Note: Previously, Sima Ying had bestowed the title of North Chanyu on him.) However, he then heard that Sima Ying's forces had collapsed in fear of Wang's troops and that Sima Ying had, against his prior advice, fled to Luoyang. He then declared his people independent from the Jin, by establishing the state of "Han", often referred to as "Han-Zhao" or "Former Zhao". He further declared that, as a Han descendant, he would succeed to the Han throne, and claimed the title of King of Han—deliberately choosing a title that had been previously held by the Han dynasty's founder, Emperor Gaozu. He re-established the worship of eight Han emperors—Emperor Gaozu, Emperor Wen, Emperor Wu, Emperor Xuan, Emperor Guangwu, Emperor Ming, Emperor Zhang, and Liu Bei (Emperor Zhaolie).

== Reign ==
For those who had previously been impressed with Liu's abilities, his reign was somewhat of a let down. He spent great energy trying to restore the Han system of government, but was unable to quickly expand his sphere of influence. He set his capital at Lishi (Note: in modern Lüliang, Shanxi), but his control of territory became limited to that local region. His forces were often able to achieve victories over Jin forces but were unable to hold cities. In 305, after a famine, he relocated to Liting (Note: in modern Changzhi, Shanxi).

As years went by, however, the various agrarian rebel generals who were resisting Jin rule, whether ethnically Wu Hu or Han, often chose to come under Liu Yuan's Han banner. Chief among these were the Chinese general Wang Mi and the Jie general Shi Le (Note: both of whom declared loyalty to Han in 307), who generally only nominally submitted to Liu's orders while maintaining separate power structures but who also did appear to genuinely respect and fear Liu. Liu largely entrusted troops under his own control to his son Liu Cong, the Prince of Chu and his nephew Liu Yao, the Prince of Shi'an. The four generals, while not being able to hold cities, were generally able to rove throughout northern and central China unimpeded by Jin forces, defeating most Jin generals who opposed them.

In 308, Wang's troops advanced on the Jin capital, Luoyang, but was repelled. In November that year, after capturing more territory, Liu Yuan moved his capital to Puzi (Note: in modern Linfen, Shanxi) and declared himself emperor, signifying an even more complete break from the Jin. In 309, he moved the capital once more to Pingyang (also in modern Linfen). By this time, Liu Cong and Wang Mi controlled all of southern Shanxi for Han, and they attacked Luoyang again, but were repelled.

In 310, Liu Yuan grew ill, and he created his second wife Lady Shan empress and his oldest son Liu He (by his first wife Empress Huyan—who appeared to have died by this point) crown prince. When he died later that year, Liu He became emperor. However, a week later, he was overthrown and killed by Liu Cong, who then became emperor.

== Physical appearance ==
In the Book of Wei, Chinese author Wei Shou notes that Liu Yuan was over six feet tall and that he had strands of red hair in his long beard.

== Skepticism over lineage ==
Some modern Chinese academics, such as Tang Changru and Chen Yong, cast doubt on Liu Yuan's lineage from the Southern Xiongnu chanyus, with Tang in particular presenting three reasons. Firstly, Liu Bao's lifespan was unusually long: with the assumption that he was 20 years old when he became Tuqi King in 195 and dying during Tufa Shujineng's Rebellion sometime around 274, he would have been in his 70s when Liu Yuan was born in the 250s. Secondly, the Leader (or Commander) of the Left Tribe in 272 was Li Ke and not Liu Bao according to the annals of Emperor Wu in the Jin Shu, but Liu Yuan's biography states that he inherited the position from his father. Thirdly, Liu Yuan was from Xinxing Commandery (north of present-day Xinzhou, Shanxi), which would have placed him in the North Tribe rather than the Left Tribe. Furthermore, the Jin Shu states that after becoming Leader of the Left Tribe, he was later transferred to become Commander of the North Tribe, and when Sima Ying permitted him to return to the Xiongnu, he was given the title of North Chanyu rather than the vacant title of South Chanyu, which was held by his supposed ancestors.

Tang hypothesized that these discrepancies were due to Liu Yuan actually being from the Chuge people (also known as Xiuchuge), which is supported by the fact that he and his family members are referred to as "Chuge" in several passages from relevant records. The Chuge are theorized to be the descendants of King Xiutu's tribe, who surrendered to the Han dynasty in 121 BC, much earlier than the Southern Xiongnu. From the Hexi Corridor, the Chuge spread out throughout northern China and became the most powerful and prestigious tribe among the Xiongnu within China. In 188 AD, they killed the Southern Xiongnu chanyu, Qiangqu and exiled his son Yufuluo. After the Five Divisions were established in Bingzhou, they were all annexed by Liu Bao of the Chuge in the 250s. It is possible that Liu Yuan and Han-Zhao historians fabricated his ties to the Luandi clan for more legitimacy by presenting his rule as both a continuation of the Southern Xiongnu chanyus and a restoration of the Han dynasty.

However, another modern scholar, Zhou Weizhou, challenged Tang's hypothesis, asserting that the three discrepancies he pointed out could easily be explained and that the records clearly states that Liu Yuan was a descendant of the Southern Xiongnu Chanyu. Firstly, it is not beyond the realm of possibility that Liu Bao was a child when he was appointed Tuqi King and had Liu Yuan when he was in his 50s. Li Ke was also described as a "general of Liu Meng (Leader of the Central Tribe)" in Hu Fen's biography in the Book of Jin, so there is no consensus on whether he was the Leader (or Commander) of the Left Tribe or merely a general. For his last point, Zhou explains that the offices of the Southern Xiongnu, including that of the chanyu family, were mostly empty titles and that their positions could be easily changed by the Jin court as a method of divide and rule, though they could occasionally be sent back to their respective tribes to recruit and garrison soldiers. While Zhou agrees on the origins of the Chuge, he also believes that the reason for their prevalence was because there were no longer any "pureblooded Xiongnu" at the time, and that Chuge had become a blanket term particularly for the sinicized Xiongnu.

== Family ==
Consorts and their respective issue(s):

- Empress Huyan, of the Huyan clan (呼延皇后), daughter of Huyan Yi (呼延翼)
  - Liu He, Prince of Liang (劉和 梁王, d. 310), first son
- Empress Shan, of the Dan clan (單皇后), daughter of Dan Zheng (單徵)
  - Liu Ai Prince of Beihai (劉乂 北海王, d. 317), seventh son
- Furen, of the Zhang clan (张夫人)
  - Liu Cong (劉恭, d. 310), second son
  - Liu Cong, the Prince of Chu (劉聰 楚王, d. 31 August 318), fourth son
- Unknown
  - Third son
  - Liu Yu, the Prince of Qi (劉裕 齐王, d. 310), fifth son
  - Liu Long, the Prince of Lu (劉隆 鲁王, d. 310), sixth son

== Notes ==
Emperor Guangwen of Han (Zhao) House of Liu Died: 310
Regnal titles
Recreated Title last held by Emperor Gaozu of Han	King of Han; 304–308	Succeeded by Himself as Emperor of Han-Zhao
Preceded by Himself as King of Han	Emperor of Han-Zhao; 308–310	Succeeded by Liu He
Titles in pretence
Preceded by Emperor Hui of Jin	— TITULAR — Empire of China; Royal descent claimant 304–310; Reason for succession failure: Wu Hu uprising	Succeeded by Liu He
