= Liu Cong (Han-Zhao) =

Emperor Zhaowu of Han 漢昭武帝
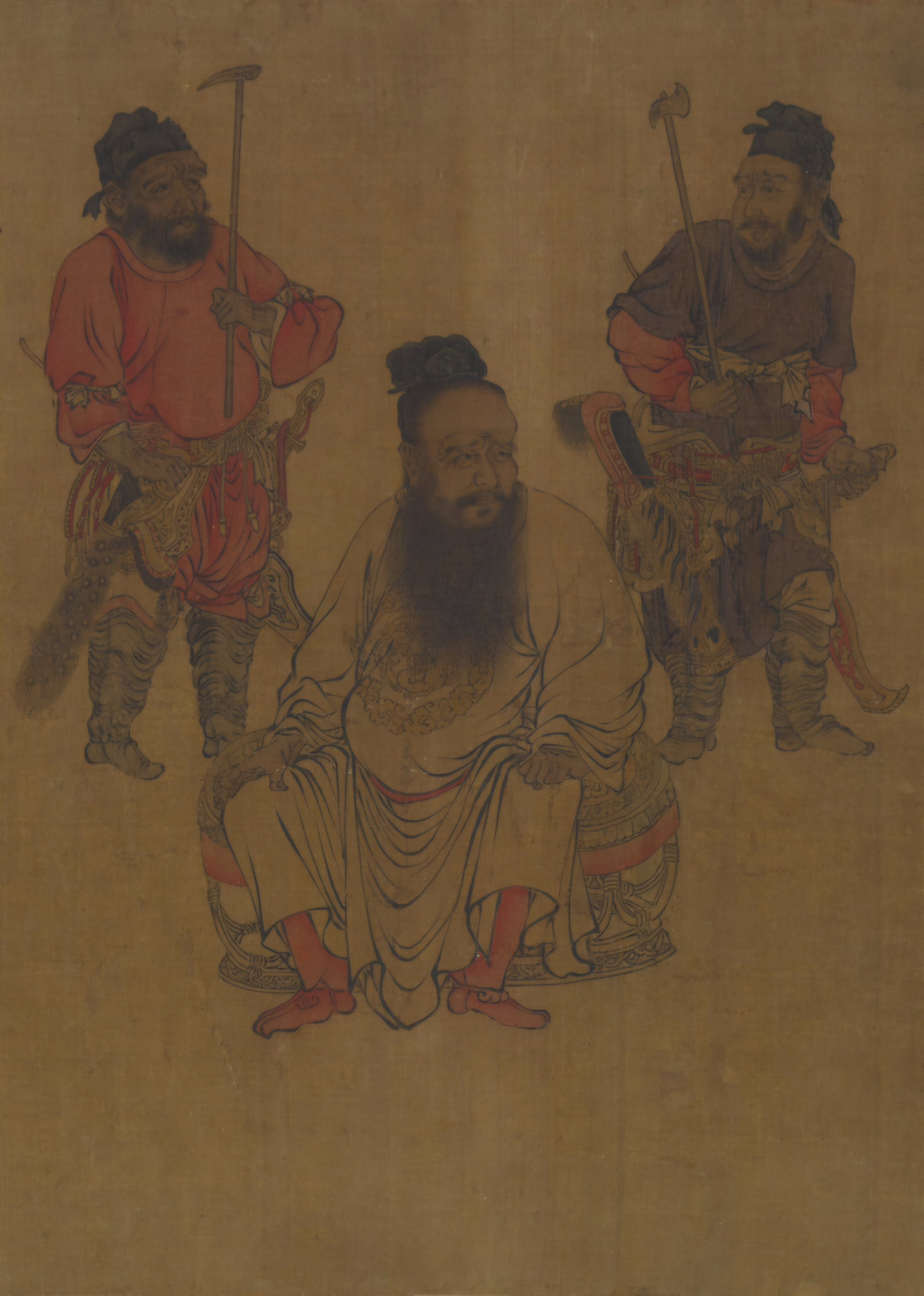
- Depiction of Liu Cong from "A Chained Remonstration" (鎖諫圖), attributed to the Tang dynasty painter, Yan Liben.

Emperor of Han-Zhao
- Reign: September 28, 310 – August 31, 318
- Predecessor: Liu He
- Successor: Liu Can
- Born: Unknown
- Died: 31 August 318
- Burial: Xuanguang Mausoleum (宣光陵)
- Spouse: Empress Huyan; Empress Zhang Huiguang; Liu E among others
- Issue: see #Personal information
Names
- Family name: Liu (劉); Given name: Cong (聰); Courtesy name: Xuanming (玄明); Nickname: Zai (載)
Era dates
- Guāngxīng (光興): 310–311; Jiāpíng (嘉平): 311–315; Jiànyuán (建元): 315–316; Línjiā (麟嘉): 316–318
Posthumous name
- Emperor Zhaowu (昭武皇帝)
Temple name
- Liezong (烈宗)
- House: Liu
- Dynasty: Han-Zhao
- Father: Liu Yuan
- Mother: Consort Zhang

Liu Cong (died 31 August 318), courtesy name Xuanming, nickname Zai, also known by his posthumous name as the Emperor Zhaowu of Han (Zhao), was an emperor of the Xiongnu-led Chinese Han-Zhao dynasty. During his reign, the Han-Zhao brought about the fall of the Western Jin dynasty, leading to its re-establishment in the south as the Eastern Jin dynasty at Jiankang in 318. His forces conquered the ancient Chinese capitals of Luoyang and Chang'an. He also captured Emperor Huai of Jin and Emperor Min of Jin, who he both had executed after forcing them to act as cupbearers.

Liu Cong's reign was filled with contradictions. He was a ruler who was considered intelligent and capable of logical reasoning, and during his father Liu Yuan's reign, he was a capable general. On the other hand, as his reign progressed, he became increasingly cruel, unstable, extravagant, and unable to listen to proper advice. Faced with opposition from his own ministers, he greatly empowered his eunuchs and consort kin, leading to political instability which ended in a bloody purge of the Han court. Meanwhile, the Han expanded from a small state occupying modern southern Shanxi to encompassing nearly all of modern Shanxi, Shaanxi, eastern Gansu, and significant portions of Shandong, Hebei, and Henan–although the eastern half of the empire was under the control of the warlord Shi Le, who Liu Cong had little to no power to restrain. After his death, his successor and family members in the capital were slaughtered by a consort kin, Jin Zhun, and not long after, the empire was split into two between his cousin, Liu Yao in the west and Shi Le in the east.

== Early life and career ==
Liu Cong was Liu Yuan's fourth son, by his concubine Consort Zhang. When he was young, he was considered both intelligent and strong, and when he studied in the Jin capital Luoyang, his knowledge was said to have impressed the Jin officials Le Guang and Zhang Hua. Eventually, he was invited by the ambitious Sima Yong, the Prince of Hejian, to be on his staff, but he was concerned that, since his father was on the staff of Sima Ying, the crown prince, he would be considered to have divided loyalties. He therefore fled to Sima Ying and served as a junior officer.

After Liu Yuan declared himself the Prince of Han –thus establishing Han-Zhao– in 304, he made Liu Cong one of his key generals and made him the Prince of Chu. In 309, in conjunction with Shi Le, he had a major victory over the Jin general Wang Kuang at Changping (in modern Jincheng, Shanxi). Upon the victory, however, he prematurely tried to advance on Luoyang and was defeated by the Jin general Huan Yan, who tricked him by pretending to surrender. However, several months later, he tried again to capture Luoyang in conjunction with Wang Mi, but as he besieged the city, the Jin regent Sima Yue, the Prince of Donghai made surprise attacks from inside the city, and Liu Cong suffered several repeated attacks. Liu Yuan then recalled him back to the capital Pingyang (in modern Linfen, Shanxi).

In mid 310, Liu Yuan grew ill. He made Liu Cong's older brother Liu He (by Empress Huyan) crown prince, and commissioned his other sons Liu Yu the Prince of Qi, Liu Long the Prince of Lu, and Liu Ai the Prince of Beihai with substantial troops at the capital, in addition to the large army that Liu Cong already had, with intent that they assist Liu He with governance and military matters. A group of officials, both Xiongnu and Han, were given various responsibilities in assisting Liu He. However, three officials were left out–Liu He's uncle Huyan You, Liu Cheng –who had prior grudges with Liu Cong– and Liu Rui, the Prince of Xichang. They were disgruntled, and persuaded the already suspicious Liu He that he could not be safe if his brothers maintained large forces in or near the capital. Three days after Liu Yuan's death, under Liu He's orders, these officials commenced surprise attacks on Liu He's four brothers–Liu Rui against Liu Chong, Huyan You against Liu Yu, Liu Cheng against Liu Long, and Tian Mi and Liu Gui against Liu Ai. When Tian and Liu Gui got on the way, however, they did not attack Liu Ai and instead escorted him to alert Liu Cong, who then prepared for the confrontation. Liu Rui withdrew his troops. Over the next two days, Liu Yu and Liu Long were defeated and killed. Two days later, Liu Cong besieged the palace and killed Liu He, Liu Cheng, Liu Rui, and Huyan. After initially offering the throne to Liu Ai, Liu Cong assumed the throne himself.

== Early reign ==
After Liu Cong took the throne, he made his brother Liu Ai crown prince, promising to eventually give Liu Ai the throne. He made his wife Princess Huyan empress, and made her son Liu Can the Prince of Jin, putting him in charge of much of his troops, along with his cousin Liu Yao, the Prince of Shi'an. Both Liu Yuan's empress Empress Shan and Liu Cong's own mother Consort Zhang were honored as empresses dowager.

In 310, Crown Prince Ai's mother, Empress Shan died–said to be from shame after her affair with Liu Cong was discovered by her son Liu Ai. After she died, Liu Cong's favor for his brother quickly waned, although he was said to still be keeping him as crown prince because of his love for her. Empress Huyan, however, began to try to persuade him to make Liu Can crown prince instead, and he began to consider the matter.

Liu Cong continued to put up pressure against Jin and its capital Luoyang. His generals Liu Yao, Liu Can, Shi Le, and Wang Mi continued to defeat Jin forces easily, capturing cities and killing Jin officials, but continued to have difficulty holding cities permanently. However, they rendered the Jin heartland stripped and barren. In early 311, Shi Le crushed the remaining major Jin force in central China, previously commanded by Sima Yue, which was trying to head east after his death. Shi had the Jin officials and generals he captured executed and burned Sima Yue's body. Luoyang was left defenseless, and in mid 311, at Liu Cong's orders Wang, Shi, Liu Yao, and Huyan Yan converged on Luoyang and captured it and the Emperor Huai of Jin, taking him to the Han capital Pingyang. This capture of the Jin capital is known as the Disaster of Yongjia. Wang suggested that the capital be moved to Luoyang, but Liu Yao opposed and burned much of Luoyang, and Liu Cong did not seriously consider Wang's suggestion afterwards. In late 311, Shi ambushed Wang at a feast and seized Wang's troops, and afterwards, while continuing to show outward loyalty to Han, became effectively independent. His intent from that point on appeared to be enlarging his own personal dominion.

In early 312, Empress Huyan died. Less than a month later, Liu Cong began to take a large number of his high-level officials' daughters and granddaughters as concubines, including a number of them with the family name Liu–daughters and granddaughters of his official Liu Yin – which Crown Prince Ai opposed due to the general prohibition against endogamy. However, Liu Cong rationalized that these Liu women were ethnically Han, and he himself was ethnically Xiongnu, and therefore could not have come from the same ancestry. From this point on, Liu Cong was said to have spent all his time with these women and rarely spent time to handle government matters.

Also in early 312, Liu Cong made the former Jin emperor the Duke of Kuaiji. Once, after inviting the Duke to a feast, Liu Cong commented on a meeting they had while the former emperor was still the Prince of Yuzhang, leading to a notable colloquy in which the duke skillfully flattered the Han emperor. The next day, Liu Cong gave one of his favorite concubines, one of Liu Yin's granddaughters, to the Duke as a gift, making her the Duchess of Kuaiji.

In mid 312, the first real signs of trouble in Liu Cong's reign came, as he executed a prince in charge of river matters and a duke in charge of construction on trivial matters–the prince for failing to supply his court with sufficient fish and crabs, and the duke for failing to complete two palaces on time. When the general Wang Zhang tried to persuade him to control his behavior, he became enraged and wanted Wang killed, but imprisoned Wang after Wang's daughter, a concubine of his, interceded. Later, he regretted his actions and released and promoted Wang, but this incident started a pattern of impulsive, often cruel, actions, that would plague the rest of his reign.

Later in mid 312, Liu Cong wanted to make Liu Yin's daughter Liu Ying empress to replace Empress Huyan, but at his mother Empress Dowager Zhang's insistence, he created another concubine, Empress Zhang Huiguang–a daughter of his cousin Zhang Shi (not to be confused with the contemporaneous Jin official of the same name, whose domain later evolved into Former Liang)– empress.

In late 312, Han forces, under Liu Can and Liu Yao, dealt a serious blow to the Jin general Liu Kun the governor of Bing Province (modern northern and central Shanxi), who had been a constant threat to the Han, capturing Liu Kun's headquarters at Jinyang (in modern Taiyuan, Shanxi) and killing Liu Kun's parents. While Liu Kun was able to recapture Jinyang with the assistance of the Xianbei chief Tuoba Yilu, he would not pose a serious threat to Han from that point on.

In early 313, at the imperial new year celebration, Liu Cong ordered the former Jin emperor, the Duke of Kuaiji him to serve the high-level officials wine, and former Jin officials Yu Min and Wang Juan could not control their emotions at seeing his humiliation, and cried out loud. This made Liu Cong angry, and he falsely accused Yu and Wang, along with a number of former Jin officials, of being ready to betray Pingyang and offer it to Liu Kun. He then executed those former Jin officials and poisoned the former emperor. He took the Duchess of Kuaiji, formerly awarded to the duke, back as a concubine.

Later in early 313, Liu Cong's mother Empress Dowager Zhang died. Her grandniece, Empress Zhang, was so depressed and mournful after the empress dowager's death that she died as well. Liu Cong replaced her with Liu Yin's daughter Liu E, and ordered that a palace be built for her. His minister Chen Yuanda tried to convince him that it was overly wasteful, and Liu Cong, in anger, ordered Chen's execution. However, the new empress interceded, and Chen was spared and further promoted. For the next year, under Empress Liu's and Chen's advice, Liu Cong was said to have corrected his behavior to some extent.

In mid 313, the nephew of the deceased Emperor Huai of Jin, Sima Ye, declared himself emperor (as Emperor Min of Jin) in Chang'an, but due to the weakness of his forces did not pose a serious threat to the Han. Still, this move drew Liu Cong's attention, and for the next several years, Chang'an would become a major target for Han forces.

In early 314, Empress Liu died, and it was said that from that point on, Liu Cong's palace would be thoroughly in a confused state, and Liu Cong's own personal behavior appeared to degenerate after this, without her counsel.

== Late reign ==
In 314, Liu Cong made his son Liu Can the prime minister, with paramount powers. This scared the crown prince Liu Ai, whose associates, in 315 suggested that he start a coup and overthrow Liu Cong. Liu Ai did not agree to the plot, but news leaked anyway. Liu Cong put Liu Ai under house arrest.

Later in 315, Liu Cong took two of his general Jin Zhun's daughters, Jin Yueguang and Jin Yuehua into his palace, and created three empresses–Jin Yueguang as Upper Empress, Jin Yuehua as Right Empress, and Consort Liu (might have been Liu Yin's granddaughter) Left Empress–against the custom that there should only be one empress for the emperor at one time. Later that year, Chen Yuanda revealed to him that the Upper Empress had been committing adultery, and Liu Cong was compelled to depose her; she committed suicide.

In late 315, Liu Cong, to appease the ever growing power of Shi Le, commissioned Shi with imperial powers in the eastern empire (which Shi controlled in any case).

Around this time, he also became extremely trusting of the eunuchs Wang Chen, Xuan Huai, and the servant Guo Yi, entrusting all government matters to them and cancelling regular meetings with officials, letting Wang, Xuan, and Guo serve as communicators between him and the officials. This led to Wang, Xuan, and Guo becoming free to act at their whim, and they became corrupt, in cooperation with Jin Zhun. A number of officials who spoke out against these men were executed. Both Guo and Jin had prior grudges against Crown Prince Ai, and they convinced Liu Can that Crown Prince Ai would try to depose Liu Cong and kill him, presenting Liu Can with false evidence of such a plot. Liu Can began to plot how to remove his uncle.

In late 316, Liu Cong sent Liu Yao to attack Chang'an, and Liu Yao captured it and the Jin emperor, sending him to Pingyang, thus ending the so-called Western Jin Dynasty. Liu Cong made the former Jin emperor the Marquess of Huai'an, and made Liu Yao the Prince of Qin and put him in charge of the western empire.

Around the start of 317, Shi Le defeated Liu Kun and took over his domain of Jin's Bing Province. While this finally ended a former threat against Han, Shi's power became even stronger and independent of Liu Cong's.

In early 317, Liu Can finally readied his plan to eliminate his uncle Crown Prince Ai. He falsely informed Crown Prince Ai that Pingyang was under attack and that his subordinates should arm themselves to prepare for the attack. Then, Liu Can informed his father that Crown Prince Ai was ready to attack–and when Liu Cong's messengers saw the Crown Prince's associates armed, they believed Liu Can's accusations and reported back to Liu Cong. Liu Can then further interrogated Crown Prince Ai's subordinate Di and Qiang chiefs (whom Crown Prince Ai commanded, based on his secondary title of Grand Chanyu) under torture, and the Di and Qiang chiefs were forced to falsely confess to a plot. Crown Prince Ai's associates and troops were all massacred–estimated at the cost of 15,000 men–and Crown Prince Ai was deposed and subsequently assassinated by Jin. When Di and Qiang tribes subsequently revolted due to the treatment of their chiefs, Liu Cong sent Jin to suppress them, and Jin was successful. In late 317, Liu Cong made Liu Can crown prince.

In early 318, at a feast, Liu Cong had the former Jin emperor, the Marquess of Huai'an serve as butler, and a number of former Jin officials could not control themselves and cried out loud at their former emperor's humiliation. Further, around this time, there were a number of uprisings against Han, each claiming to want to capture Liu Can to exchange him for the former Jin emperor. Liu Can therefore recommended that Sima Ye be executed, and Liu Cong agreed, executing him after receiving Liu Can's report.

In mid 318, an imperial meeting hall in Pingyang was destroyed by a great fire that killed 21 people, including Liu Cong's son Liu Kang the Prince of Kuaiji. Liu Cong was said to have greatly mourned his son, and this appeared to have a terrible effect on his health. He summoned Liu Yao and Shi Le to the capital to serve as regents, but both Liu Yao and Shi declined. He died soon after, and Liu Can became emperor.

== Consorts and issue ==
- Wives
  - Empress Wuyuan, of the Huyan clan (d. 312)
  - Empress Wuxiao, of the Zhang clan (d. 313), personal name Huiguang
  - Empress Liu (d. 314)
  - Multiple empresses after Empress Liu's death:
    - Upper Empress Jin (d. 315), personal name Yueguang (靳月光); daughter of Jin Zhun
    - Left Empress Liu; relative of Empress Liu
    - Right Empress Jin, personal name Yuehua (靳月華); daughter of Jin Zhun
    - Upper Empress Fan
    - Left Empress Wang; adopted daughter of Wang Chen (王沈)
    - Middle Empress Xuan; adopted daughter of Xuan Huai (宣懷)
- Major concubines
  - Consort Liu, personal name Ying (英), posthumously honored as Empress Wude; Empress Liu's sister and daughter of Liu Yin (劉殷)
  - Four nieces of Empress Liu and granddaughters of Liu Yin (may include Left Empress Liu)
  - Consort Zhang, Empress Wuxiao's sister
  - Consort Wang; daughter of Wang Yu (王育)
  - Consort Ren; daughter of Ren Yi (任顗)
  - Consort Wang; daughter of Wang Zhang (王彰)
  - Consort Fan; daughter of Fan Long (范隆)
  - Consort Ma; daughter of Ma Jing (馬景)
- Sons
  - Liu Can (劉粲), Emperor Yin
  - Liu Yi (劉易, note different character than his brother), Prince of Hejian (d. 316)
  - Liu Yi (劉翼, note different character than his brother), Prince of Pengcheng
  - Liu Li (劉悝), Prince of Gaoping
  - Liu Fu (劉敷), Prince of Bohai (d. 316)
  - Liu Ji (劉驥), Prince of Jinan (d. 318)
  - Liu Luan (劉鸞), Prince of Yan
  - LIu Hong (劉鴻), Prince of Chu
  - Liu Mai (劉勱), Prince of Qi (d. 318)
  - Liu Quan (劉權), Prince of Qin
  - Liu Cao (劉操), Prince of Wei
  - LIu Chi (劉持), Prince of Zhao
  - Liu Heng (劉恆), Prince of Dai
  - Liu Cheng (劉逞), Prince of Wu (d. 318)
  - Liu Lang (劉朗), Prince of Yingchuan
  - Liu Gao (劉皋), Prince of Lingling
  - Liu Xu (劉旭), Prince of Danyang
  - Liu Jing (劉京), Prince of Shu
  - Liu Tan (劉坦), Prince of Jiujiang
  - Liu Huang (劉晃), Prince of Linchuan
  - Liu Kang (劉康), Prince of Kuaiji (d. 318)
  - Liu Yue (劉約; d. 318?)

Emperor Zhaowu of Han (Zhao) House of Liu Died: 31 August 318
Regnal titles
Preceded by Liu He	Emperor of Han-Zhao; 310–318	Succeeded by Liu Can
Titles in pretence
Preceded by Liu He; Emperor Min of Jin	— TITULAR — Emperor of China; Royal descent claimant 310–318; Reason for succession failure: Wu Hu uprising Sixteen Kingdoms	Succeeded by Liu Can
