= Liu He (Han-Zhao) =

Liu He 劉和

Emperor of Han-Zhao
- Reign: 310
- Predecessor: Liu Yuan
- Successor: Liu Cong
- Born: Unknown
- Died: 310
Names
- Family name: Liu (劉); Given name: Yuan (和); Courtesy name: Xuantai (玄泰)
- House: Liu
- Dynasty: Han-Zhao
- Father: Liu Yuan
- Mother: Empress Huyan

Liu He (died 4 September 310), courtesy name Xuantai, was briefly the second emperor of the Xiongnu-led Chinese Han-Zhao dynasty. He reigned for seven days in August and September 310.

== Life ==
Liu He was the founding emperor Liu Yuan (Emperor Guangwen)'s son, likely oldest son, by his first wife Empress Huyan. According to the Book of Jin, Liu He was described as having an imposing, handsome and sturdy look, and was about 1.96 metres (6.4 ft) tall. He was studious, but suspicious and miserly. Liu He was made the Prince of Liang (梁王), a title that he was posthumously known by as well, in 308. In early 310, Liu Yuan made him crown prince.

Before Liu Yuan died later in August 310, he commissioned his sons and Liu He's brothers Liu Yu the Prince of Qi, Liu Long the Prince of Lu, and Liu Ai the Prince of Beihai with substantial troops at the capital, in addition to the large army that another son, Liu Cong the Prince of Chu, already had, with intent that they assist him with governance and military matters. A group of officials, both Xiongnu and Chinese, were given various responsibilities in assisting Liu He. However, three officials were left out—Liu He's uncle Huyan You, Liu Cheng – who had prior grudges with Liu Cong – and Liu Rui the Prince of Xichang. They were disgruntled, and they persuaded the already suspicious Liu He that he could not be safe if his brothers maintained large forces in or near the capital. Three days after Liu Yuan's death, under Liu He's orders, these officials carried out surprise attacks on Liu He's four brothers—Liu Rui against Liu Chong, Huyan You against Liu Yu, Liu Cheng against Liu Long, and Tian Mi and Liu Gui against Liu Ai. Once Tian and Liu Gui got on the way, however, they did not attack Liu Ai but instead escorted him to alert Liu Cong, who then prepared for the confrontation. Liu Rui withdrew his troops. Over the next two days, Liu Yu and Liu Long were defeated and killed. Two days later, Liu Cong besieged the palace and killed Liu He, Liu Cheng, Liu Rui, and Huyan. After initially offering the throne to Liu Ai, Liu Cong assumed the throne himself.

Prince of Liang House of Liu Died: 310
Regnal titles
| Preceded by Liu Yuan | Emperor of Han-Zhao; 310 | Succeeded by Liu Cong |
Titles in pretence
| Preceded by Liu Yuan | — TITULAR — Emperor of China; Royal descent claimant 310; Reason for succession failure: Wu Hu uprising | Succeeded by Liu Cong |
