= Han-Zhao =

Chuge-Xiongnu state (304–329) during the Sixteen Kingdoms period

Han-Zhao Former Zhao 漢 (304–319) 趙 (319–329)
- late 304 (Note: Sima Guang noted that when Li Xiong and Liu Yuan declared themselves independent from Jin in 304 differed across various sources. Emperor Hui's biography in Book of Jin dated this event to the 11th month of that year (corresponding to 14 Dec 304 to 11 Jan 305 in the Julian calendar), after Emperor Hui had entered Chang'an; the Chronicles of Huayang recorded that Li Xiong declared independence in the 10th month (14 Nov to 13 Dec 304), with one version dating the event to the 12th month (12 Jan to 10 Feb 305) instead. The Zizhi Tongjian followed the Sanshi Guo Chunqiu, Shiliuguo Chunqiu and Jin Chunqiu in dating Li Xiong and Liu Yuan declaring themselves independent to the 10th month.)–329
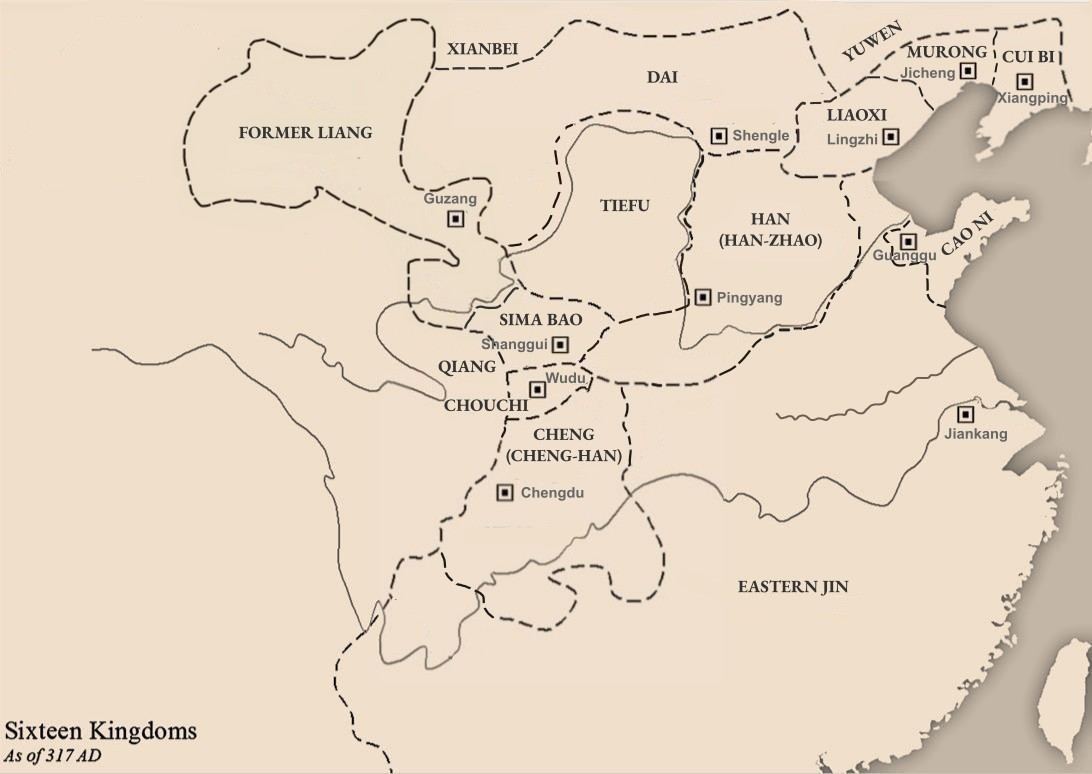
- Han-Zhao before split, c. 317, northern China

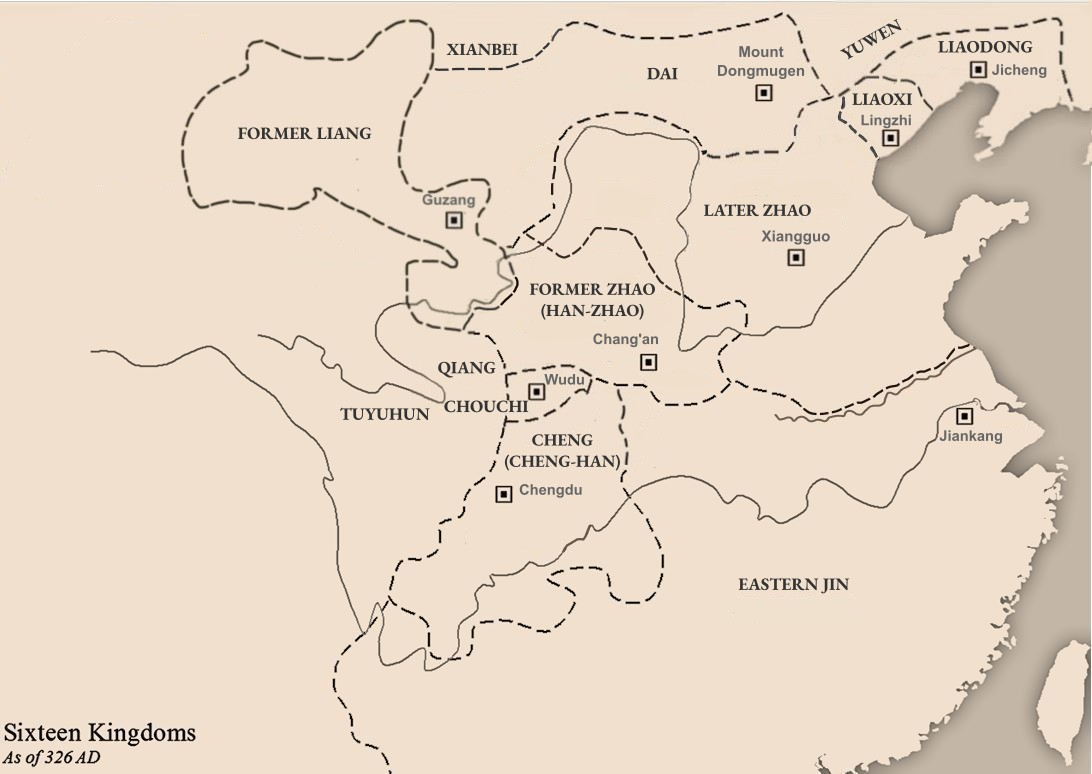
- Han-Zhao (Former Zhao) after split, c. 326
- Capital: Zuoguo (304); Lishi (304–305); Liting (305–308); Puzi (308–309); Pingyang (309–318); Chang'an (318–329); Shanggui (329)
- Religion: Tengriism, Buddhism
- Government: Monarchy
- Emperor
  - 304–310: Liu Yuan
  - 310: Liu He
  - 310–318: Liu Cong
  - 318: Liu Can
  - 318–329: Liu Yao
  - 329: Liu Xi
- History
  - Established: late 304 (Note: Sima Guang noted that when Li Xiong and Liu Yuan declared themselves independent from Jin in 304 differed across various sources. Emperor Hui's biography in Book of Jin dated this event to the 11th month of that year (corresponding to 14 Dec 304 to 11 Jan 305 in the Julian calendar), after Emperor Hui had entered Chang'an; the Chronicles of Huayang recorded that Li Xiong declared independence in the 10th month (14 Nov to 13 Dec 304), with one version dating the event to the 12th month (12 Jan to 10 Feb 305) instead. The Zizhi Tongjian followed the Sanshi Guo Chunqiu, Shiliuguo Chunqiu and Jin Chunqiu in dating Li Xiong and Liu Yuan declaring themselves independent to the 10th month.)
  - Liu Yuan's claim of imperial title: 2 November 308
  - Name change from Han to Zhao: 319
  - Liu Yao's capture by Shi Le: 21 January 329
  - Disestablished: 329

Area
- 316: 2,000,000 km^{2} (770,000 sq mi)
| Preceded by | Succeeded by |
| Western Jin | Later Zhao |
- Today part of: China

The Han-Zhao (simplified Chinese: 汉赵; traditional Chinese: 漢趙; pinyin: Hàn Zhào; 304–329 AD), or Former Zhao (simplified Chinese: 前赵; traditional Chinese: 前趙; pinyin: Qián Zhào), was a dynastic state of China ruled by the Liu (Luandi) clan of Chuge-Xiongnu ethnicity during the Sixteen Kingdoms period of Chinese history. In Chinese historiography, it was given two conditional state titles: the Northern Han (北漢; Běi Hàn), for the state proclaimed in 304 by Liu Yuan; and the Former Zhao (前趙; Qián Zhào), for the state proclaimed in 319 by Liu Yao. The reference to them as separate states can be misleading, given that when Liu Yao changed the name of the state from "Han" to "Zhao" in 319, he treated the state as having been continuous from when Liu Yuan founded it in 304; instead, he de-established his imperial lineage from the Han dynasty and claimed ancestry directly from Modu Chanyu.

The reason the Han-Zhao is also referred to as "Former Zhao" in historiography is to distinguish it from the Later Zhao founded by Shi Le in 319 (which was also known officially as "Zhao"). Since both the Former Zhao and Northern Han were ruled by the same family, Chinese scholars often conditionally combined them into a single Han-Zhao regime. Numerous Western texts refer to the two states separately; others referred to the Han state as the "Northern Han" (this is not to be confused with Northern Han of the Five Dynasties and Ten Kingdoms period).

During the Han period, the capital was frequently moved around Shanxi before finally settling in Pingyang. The Han was a driving force during the upheaval of the Five Barbarians, as they brought the Disaster of Yongjia and demise of the Western Jin dynasty by 317. At the height of its power, the Han ruled Shanxi, Shaanxi, eastern Gansu, and large parts of Shandong, Hebei, and Henan. After Jin Zhun's coup in 318, the empire, which renamed itself to (Former) Zhao in 319, was split into two between Liu Yao and the warlord, Shi Le. Liu Yao moved the capital to the west in Chang'an, retaining Shaanxi and eastern Gansu, while the eastern portion of the empire fell to Shi Le's Later Zhao dynasty.

== History ==
=== Five Divisions (216–304) ===
Following the split of the Xiongnu Empire in the 1st century, the Southern Xiongnu branch submitted to the Han dynasty and were resettled across the northern frontier province of Bing in 50 AD. Under the supervision of their chanyu, the Southern Xiongnu effectively acted as a buffer state for the Han and rendered military service by defending the borders from nomadic enemies. After helping defeat their rival Northern Xiongnu, however, relations between the Han and Southern Xiongnu deteriorated. The subsequent rise of the Xianbei people on the steppe and the restriction of the southern chanyu's authority by the Han imperial court saw many Xiongnu flee the frontier to join the Xianbei. The Chanyu's attempts to reassert his independence also received little to no support, and were swiftly crushed by the Han. Finally, in 188, just as the Han were experiencing their own collapse, dissenters within the Southern Xiongnu allied with the Xiuchuge people and expelled the chanyu family from their lands, effectively dissolving their government.

In 216, the warlord, Cao Cao had the exiled chanyu, Huchuquan detained as an honoured prisoner at Ye. With many of the frontier commanderies in Bing being lost to hostile tribes, Cao Cao had the remaining Xiongnu reorganized into the Five Divisions (五部; Left, Right, South, North and Centre) and confined them to the Fen River valley in modern-day Shanxi. By moving them inwards, the Chinese court could better monitor the Xiongnu and continue to use them as cavalry units. Each division was led by a commander, who were nobles from the tribes and were in turn supervised by a Chinese marshal. Huchuquan's uncle, Qubei was also sent to oversee the Five Divisions, while the position of chanyu was abolished.

Illustration of a seal with the imprint "Wei Chuge shuaishan baizhang" (魏屠各率善佰长). The imprint comes from a Cao Wei era (220–266) seal that was bestowed to a Chuge vassal chieftain.

The Five Divisions continued to serve under the Cao Wei and Western Jin courts, and by the 280s, their population was estimated at more than 29,000 encampments. Many of them took up agriculture and stockbreeding as they shifted towards a more sedentary lifestyle. Sinicization was especially evident among their ruling elites, who adopted Chinese surnames such as "Liu" (劉) due to the Xiongnu's past political marriages (heqin) with the ruling Liu clan of the Han dynasty. However, resentment also began to grow among their ranks. During the Jiaping era (249–254), a disturbance was reported whereby the Commander of the Left Divisions, Liu Bao, unified the Five Divisions and mobilized a great army. The Chinese court intervened, dividing them back into five and forcing their nobility to send their children as hostages to the capital at Luoyang. Among these hostages were Liu Bao's son, Liu Yuan, who was brought up on Confucian scholar culture and befriended members of the Chinese aristocracy, such as the Wang clan of Taiyuan. They were later allowed to hold office, but they remained under suspicion and only granted low ranks.

In traditional history, Liu Yuan is stated to be a member of the chanyu Luandi clan, being the grandson of the penultimate chanyu and Huchuquan's brother, Yufuluo, as well as a direct descendant of Modu Chanyu. However, modern scholars have questioned this claim. After the dissolution of the Southern Xiongnu, the Xiongnu as an identity declined as their former people began to intermarry with their surrounding ethnic groups. Within the Five Divisions, a new "Chuge" (屠各) identity had taken form by the time of Liu Yuan. The Chuge, or Xiuchuge, were a group believed to be descended from the people of King Xiutu, a Xiongnu vassal king in Gansu who surrendered in 121 BC. These people were resettled across Shaanxi and Shanxi much earlier than the other Xiongnu, also serving as auxiliaries for the Han. Historical records and excavated seals show that they were considered a separate group from the Southern Xiongnu, and likely only merged with them after the fall of Han. Various passages in text refer to Liu Yuan and his family as Chuge, which led some historians to believe that their genealogy had been forged for legitimacy purposes. Others suggest that his genealogy was authentic, but that the Chuge had become the dominant and general identity for the sinicized Xiongnu, including the Luandi clan.

=== Han (304–319) ===
At the start of the 4th century, the Western Jin descended into a series of civil wars as part of the War of the Eight Princes. By 304, the wars had severely weakened the Jin military in the north, and the princes sought help from their vassal tribes to revitalize their armies. At the time, Liu Yuan was serving as a general under the Prince of Chengdu, Sima Ying at Ye, who was facing military pressure from the Prince of Donghai, Sima Yue and his allies. Sensing an opportunity to breakaway, the Five Divisions contacted Liu Yuan and offered him the role of their leader. Liu Yuan agreed, and he soon left Ye after promising his prince that he would bring his people over as reinforcements. Once he arrived at the city of Zuoguo (左國; in present-day Lishi District, Shanxi), Liu Yuan was hailed by the rebels as the Grand Chanyu.

Despite his ethnic background, Liu Yuan later ascended as the King of Han that same year, proclaiming his intentions to restore the fallen Han dynasty. He cited the heqin marriages between his chanyu ancestors and the Han, styling himself as a "nephew" of the imperial Han clan and honouring the emperors of the Western, Eastern and Shu Han. With anti-Jin sentiment spreading throughout the North China Plain due to the ongoing wars and famines, Liu Yuan also accepted submissions from rebel forces of various ethnicities, Wang Mi and the Jie former slave, Shi Le. At the time, the Shanxi region was suffering from a severe famine that forced Liu Yuan to shift his capital multiple times. After twenty days at Zuoguo, Liu Yuan and his followers moved to Lishi city, then the following year to Liting (黎亭; in modern Changzhi, Shanxi). As his army struggled to take northern Shanxi, Liu Yuan turned his focus to the south to place pressure on Luoyang. In 308, after conquering Pingyang Commandery, Liu Yuan moved his capital to Puzi (in modern Linfen, Shanxi), and finally to Pingyang city (also in modern Linfen), which remained the Han capital for the next decade.

In 310, Liu Yuan died of natural causes, and a succession struggle soon ensued. Shortly after his ascension, Liu Yuan's eldest son, Liu He launched a purge against his half-brothers to eliminate his rival claimants. The purge came to an abrupt end when one of the brothers, Liu Cong retaliated with his soldiers and killed Liu He just a week into his reign. Liu Cong was Liu Yuan's fourth son through a concubine, which placed him relatively low in the line of succession. He initially offered the throne to his other half-brother, Liu Ai, the youngest but only surviving son of Liu Yuan's empress. When his offer was rejected, Liu Cong proclaimed himself emperor instead and appointed Liu Ai as his crown prince, but the ambiguity surrounding his succession became an issue that plagued Liu Cong for most of his reign.

Soon, Liu Cong intensified his attacks on Luoyang. The capital had also been affected by the widespread famine at the time, which caused the imperial army under Sima Yue to relocate themselves to the nearby city of Xuchang. In 311, shortly after Sima Yue died of illness, Shi Le led his followers to annihilate the imperial army at the Battle of Ningping. Han forces then descended onto Luoyang, sacking the defenseless city and capturing Emperor Huai of Jin in the Disaster of Yongjia. Remnants of Jin officials managed to reestablish their court at Chang'an in the northwest and installed Huai's nephew, Emperor Min as their figurehead. However, five years later, they too were crushed by forces led by Liu Cong's cousin, Liu Yao. Both Huai and Min suffered similar fates; they were forced to serve as cupbearers for Liu Cong before eventually being executed. The fall of Chang'an is often considered the end of the Western Jin dynasty. A distant relative of the emperor's family, Sima Rui survived at Jiankang to the south of the Yangtze River. In 318, with assent from his officials, he declared himself emperor and began the Eastern Jin dynasty.

Despite military success, the Han state was internally weak and unstable. In reality, their authority was limited to parts of Shanxi, while their generals outside of the region effectively acted as independent warlords. The most powerful of them was Shi Le, who quickly grew to control much of the North China Plain to the east of Pingyang. Once Chang'an was captured, Liu Cong immediately entrusted Liu Yao with guarding the Guanzhong Basin. Within the Han court, Liu Cong was also met with opposition from his own ministers. Records describe Liu Cong as a violent and wasteful ruler. He had an unusual practice of having three empresses at once, and he greatly empowered his consort kins and eunuchs as his counterweight against his officials. Furthermore, he fell out with Liu Ai and wanted to install his son, Liu Can as his new crown prince. The internal strife within the court culminated in a brutal purge, whereby Liu Cong had Liu Ai and thousands of his supporters put to death. In 318, Liu Cong died and was succeeded by Liu Can, but soon after, a powerful consort kin named Jin Zhun launched a coup, killing Liu Can and his family in Pingyang.

A 14th–17th century Ming dynasty copy of the painting, "A Chained Remonstration" (鎖諫圖), attributed to the Tang dynasty painter, Yan Liben (c. 600–673). The work depicts an episode during the reign of Liu Cong (seated centre) when he threatened to execute his minister, Chen Yuanda (tied to the tree on the right) for opposing his lavish palace projects. At the intervention of his empress, Liu E (left between the attendants with the red fans), Liu Cong was finally persuaded to spare Chen Yuanda.

=== Former Zhao (319–329) ===
When news of his coup got out, Liu Yao and Shi Le promptly formed an alliance to depose Jin Zhun. The Han loyalists that fled Pingyang acclaimed Liu Yao as their new emperor, and Jin Zhun's rebellion was soon extinguished in the following months. With much of Pingyang devastated, Liu Yao shifted the capital to his base in Chang'an. However, tension soon arose between Liu Yao and Shi Le, as Liu Yao suspected that Shi Le would use his immense influence to take advantage of Han's weakness and rebel. When Shi Le sent an envoy to congratulate him, Liu Yao had the envoy executed, causing Shi Le to declare independence. The empire was thus divided into two, with Liu Yao controlling the west and Shi Le controlling the east.

Liu Yao abandoned the state's initial positioning of Han restoration and appealed more towards his Xiongnu background to win over the various "barbarian" groups. The state was renamed to Zhao after the ancient kingdom based in Shanxi along the northern frontier, while Modu Chanyu was honoured in the ancestral temple. Invoking the Five Elements Cycle, he claimed the element of Water, generated from the Western Jin's Metal. At the same time, he also recognized Liu Yuan and Liu Cong as his predecessors, integrating their reigns into his new dynasty. Meanwhile, Shi Le also named his new regime as "Zhao"; Liu Yao's state was thus distinguished in history as the Former Zhao to Shi Le's Later Zhao.

During his early reign, Liu Yao expanded westwards while Shi Le dealt with his own matters in the east. In Longxi, he defeated the forces of Sima Bao, the last claimant to the Jin throne in the north, and later survived a major tribal rebellion by the Di and Qiang, leading to the relocation of nearly 200,000 of their people to Chang'an. Liu Yao then defeated Chen An, a warlord in Longxi who nominally submitted to Former Zhao, before going on to force the Former Liang into submission and invading Chouchi by 323. At their peak, the Former Zhao's army reportedly numbered at around 285,000 strong. Despite the state's new positioning, Liu Yao maintained interest in integrating with Chinese culture, as evident by his opening of an Imperial University in Chang'an taught by Confucian scholars.

War between the two Zhao states eventually broke out in 324. In 328, Liu Yao led his forces to secure the Henan region from Later Zhao. Liu Yao and Shi Le's forces came head to head at the Battle of Luoyang, and during the battle, Liu Yao, allegedly drunk, fell off his horse during a retreat and was captured by Later Zhao soldiers. He was then executed as his crown prince, Liu Xi, hastily succeeded him in Chang'an. In 329, Liu Xi was driven out of his capital and finally killed at Shanggui by Later Zhao forces. The Han-Zhao was destroyed, and the Later Zhao would rule most of northern China for the next 20 years.

== Government ==
For civil administration, the Han-Zhao regime adopted many central positions from the Chinese bureaucratic system such as chancellor and grand marshal. Meanwhile, they also introduced a traditional Xiongnu structure in regards to military organization and aristocratic governance. After elevating himself to King of Han, Liu Yuan deferred the role of Grand Chanyu to Liu Cong, creating a new administrative institution known as the Chanyu Platform (單于台; chanyu tai). The Chanyu Platform held military power and was tasked with managing the affairs of the minority ethnic tribes. Despite their authority, the Grand Chanyu was ultimately a subordinate role and was positioned lower than the emperor in the ruling hierarchy. The dual administration of the emperor and Chanyu Platform helped to reinforce the segregation between the Hu and Han people. The system was later adopted by many of the Sixteen Kingdoms, either as a permanent function or on a temporary basis, including the Later Zhao and Chinese regimes such as the Ran Wei and Northern Yan.

In 314, while reorganizing the government, Liu Cong created the offices of the Left and Right Director of Retainers to manage the 200,000 Chinese households along with the Left and Right Assistant Chanyu to govern the 100,000 tribes, who were collectively known as the "Six Yi" or "Six Barbarians". Modern scholars have noted that the Xiongnu from the Five Divisions and Chuge branches were not included among the "Six Yi"; they were instead administrated as part of the Han Chinese.

== Rulers of Han and Zhao ==
| Temple name | Posthumous name | Personal Name | Duration of reign | Era names |
|---|---|---|---|---|
Han 304–319
| Gaozu | Guangwen | Liu Yuan | 304–310 | Yuanxi (元熙) 304–308; Yongfeng (永鳳) 308–309; Herui (河瑞) 309–310 |
| – | | Liu He | 7 days in 310 | None |
| Liezong | Zhaowu | Liu Cong | 310–318 | Guangxing (光興) 310–311; Jiaping (嘉平) 311–315; Jianyuan (建元) 315–316; Linjia (麟嘉) 316–318 |
| – | Yin | Liu Can | a month and days in 318 | Hanchang (漢昌) 318 |
Former Zhao 319–329
| – | | Liu Yao | 318–329 | Guangchu (光初) 318–329 |
| – | | Liu Xi | 329 | None |

Note: Liu Xi was Liu Yao's crown prince who was thrust into the leadership role when Liu Yao was captured by Later Zhao's emperor Shi Le, but he never took the imperial title.

== Rulers' family tree ==
Han-Zhao emperors family tree

Han | (Former) Zhao
Liu Bao 劉豹 | Liu Lu 劉綠
Liu Yannian 刘延年 | Liu Yuan 劉淵 (d. 310); Guangwen 光文 (r. 304–310) | Liu Xiong 刘雄 | Liu Yao 劉曜 (d. 329; r. 318–329)
Liu He 劉和 (d./r. 310) | Liu Gong 刘恭 d. 310 | Liu Cong 劉聰 (d. 318); Zhāowǔdi 昭武皇帝 (r. 310–318) | Liu Yu 劉裕 (d. 310) | Liu Long 刘隆 (d. 310) | Liu Yi 刘乂 (d. 317) | Liu Yin 劉胤 (d./r. 329) | Liu Xi 劉熙 (d./r. 329)
Liu Can 劉粲 (d. 318); Yin 隱帝 (r. 318)
Liu Yuangong 劉元公 (d. 318)

== See also ==
- Xiongnu
- Chuge
- Disaster of Yongjia
- Fall of Chang'an
- Battle of Luoyang (328–329)
