= Timeline of the Xiongnu =

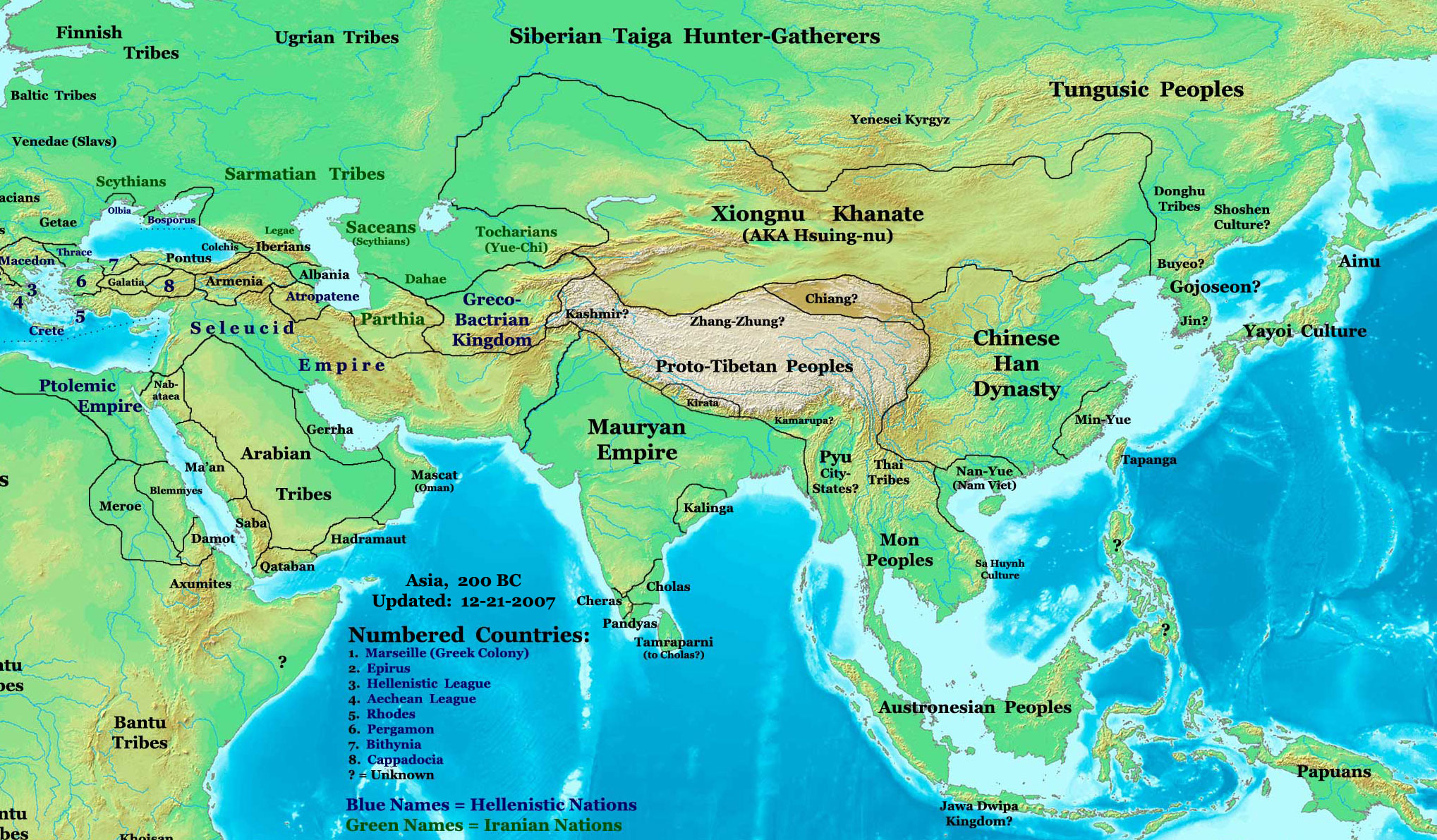
Xiongnu Empire in 200 BC

This is a timeline of the Xiongnu, a nomadic people that dominated the ancient eastern Eurasian steppes from 209 BC to 89 AD. The Xiongnu settled down in northern China during the late 3rd century AD following the Three Kingdoms period, and founded several states lasting until the Northern Liang was conquered by the Xianbei Northern Wei in 439 AD.

== 4th century BC ==
Year	Date	Event
318 BC		The Xiongnu attack Qin in conjunction with the other Warring States

== 3rd century BC ==
Year	Date	Event
265 BC		Zhao–Xiongnu War: Li Mu of Zhao draws the Xiongnu into an ambush and defeats them
214 BC		Qin's campaign against the Xiongnu: Meng Tian defeats the Xiongnu and conquers the Ordos region
209 BC		Modu Chanyu assumes power over the Xiongnu and defeats the Donghu people, who become the Wuhuan and Xianbei
203 BC		Modu Chanyu defeats the Yuezhi
201 BC		Battle of Baideng: Emperor Gaozu of Han's army is defeated by the Xiongnu
201 BC		Xin, King of Han defects to the Xiongnu

== 2nd century BC ==
Year	Date	Event
197 BC		The Xiongnu invade Dai Commandery with the help of Chen Xi and Han Xin
196 BC		The Xiongnu invade Dai Commandery with the help of Han Xin
195 BC		The Xiongnu invade You Province with the help of Lu Wan
182 BC		The Xiongnu invade Longxi Commandery and Tianshui
181 BC		The Xiongnu invade Longxi Commandery
179 BC		The Xiongnu invade Yunzhong Commandery
177 BC		The Xiongnu invade Ordos
176 BC		The Xiongnu evict the Yuezhi in the west and gain hegemony over the Western Regions as well as the Wusun
174 BC		Modu Chanyu dies and is succeeded by his son Laoshang
169 BC		The Xiongnu raid Han
166 BC		A 140,000 strong Xiongnu force invade near Chang'an
160 BC		Laoshang dies and is succeeded by his son Junchen
158 BC		A 30,000 strong Xiongnu force attacks Yunzhong Commandery and Dai Commandery
148 BC		The Xiongnu attack Yan Province
144 BC		The Xiongnu raid Yanmen Pass for horses
142 BC		The Xiongnu attack Yanmen Pass
133 BC	June	Battle of Mayi: The Han army fails to ambush the Xiongnu
129 BC		Han forces (40,000) under Wei Qing, Gongsun Ao, Gongsun He, and Li Guang engage in combat with the Xiongnu
128 BC		The Xiongnu attack Liaoxi and engage in combat with Han forces (40,000) under Wei Qing and Li Xi
127 BC		The Xiongnu raid Liaoxi and Yanmen
127 BC		Han forces under Wei Qing, Hao Xian, and Li Xi plunder the Xiongnu for livestock
126 BC		Junchen dies and is succeeded by his brother Yizhixie, who attacks Junchen's son Yudan, forcing him to flee to the Han
126 BC		The Xiongnu army (900,000) raids Han territory
124 BC		Han forces (100,000) under Wei Qing attack the Xiongnu
123 BC		Han forces (100,000) under Wei Qing attack the Xiongnu
122 BC		The Xiongnu raid Shanggu
121 BC		Han forces under Huo Qubing, Zhao Ponu, Zhang Qian, and Li Guang attack the Xiongnu
120 BC		The Xiongnu raid Youbeiping and Xingxiang, taking 1,000 captives
119 BC	June	Battle of Mobei: Han generals Huo Qubing and Wei Qing defeat the Xiongnu
116 BC		The Xiongnu raid Liang Province
114 BC		Yizhixie dies and is succeeded by his son Wuwei Chanyu
111 BC		Han forces (25,000)) under Gongsun He and Zhao Ponu try to attack the Xiongnu but can't find them
110 BC		Emperor Wu of Han personally leads Han forces (180,000) against the Xiongnu but their chanyu decides to retreat
105 BC		Wuwei Chanyu dies and is succeeded by his son Er Chanyu
103 BC		Han forces (20,000) under Zhao Ponu attack the Xiongnu but are defeated
102 BC		Er Chanyu dies and is succeeded by his uncle Xulihu
102 BC		The Xiongnu raid Jiuquan and Zhangye, capturing several thousand people
101 BC		Xulihu dies and is succeeded by his brother Chedihou Chanyu

== 1st century BC ==
Year	Date	Event
99 BC		Battle of Tian Shan: Han forces (35,000) under Li Guangli and Li Ling are defeated by the Xiongnu
97 BC		Han forces (140,000) under Li Guangli attack the Xiongnu without results
96 BC		Chedihou Chanyu dies and is succeeded by his son Hulugu
90 BC		Han forces (79,000) under Li Guangli are defeated by the Xiongnu but another Han army (30,000) under Shang Qiucheng manages to force the Xiongnu to flee
85 BC		Hulugu dies and is succeeded by his son Huyandi
78 BC		The Wuhuan pillage Xiongnu tombs
71 BC		The Han, Wusun, Dingling, and Wuhuan coalition defeats the Xiongnu
68 BC		Huyandi dies and is succeeded by his uncle Xulüquanqu
64 BC		The Xiongnu attack Jiaohe in the aftermath of the Battle of Jushi
60 BC		Xulüquanqu dies and is succeeded by a lesser noble Woyanqudi
58 BC		Woyanqudi upsets traditional customs, causing a rebellion that defeats his army, so he kills himself and the Xiongnu split up into five warring factions
55 BC		The Xiongnu coalesce into two groups, one under Zhizhi Chanyu and the other under his brother Huhanye
51 BC		Huhanye is defeated by Zhizhi Chanyu and flees to the Han
50 BC		Zhizhi Chanyu nominally submits to the Han
48 BC		Zhizhi Chanyu declares independence after seeing the Han favor his brother Huhanye, moves further west, and attacks Fergana and the Wusun
43 BC		Huhanye moves back to the north, starting the era of Western and Eastern Xiongnu.
36 BC		Battle of Zhizhi: Han forces defeat the Xiongnu and kill Zhizhi Chanyu
31 BC		Huhanye dies and is succeeded by his son Fuzhulei Ruodi
20 BC		Fuzhulei Ruodi dies and is succeeded by his brother Souxie
12 BC		Souxie dies and is succeeded by his half brother Juya
8 BC		Juya dies and is succeeded by his brother Wuzhuliu

== 1st century ==
Year	Date	Event
6		A petty king in the area of the former Jushi Kingdom defects to the Xiongnu, who turned him over to the Han
7		The Han convince the Wuhuan to stop sending tribute to the Xiongnu, who immediately attack and defeat the Wuhuan
10		Some officers of the Protector General Dan Qin kill him and flee to the Xiongnu
13		Wuzhuliu dies and is succeeded by his half brother Wulei
18		Wulei dies and is succeeded by his half brother Huduershidaogao
44		Han forces under Ma Yuan are defeated by Xiongnu
45		Xiongnu raid Changshan
46		Huduershidaogao dies and is succeeded by his son Wudadihou who dies the same year, dividing the Xiongnu into two factions between Punu Chanyu and Sutuhu
50		Sutuhu and the Southern Xiongnu settle in Bing Province
62		The Northern Xiongnu raid Han territory but are repelled
63		The Xiongnu gain control of the Western Regions and start raiding Han
73		Battle of Yiwulu: Han general Dou Gu defeats the Xiongnu and restores the Protectorate of the Western Regions
75		The Xiongnu attack Jushi and Chen Mu is killed by the locals
83		Punu Chanyu dies and is succeeded by Youliu; the Northern Xiongnu start disintegrating as tribes defect to the south and neighboring tribes invade
87		The Xianbei kill the Xiongnu Chanyu Youliu
89		Battle of the Altai Mountains: Han general Dou Xian defeats the Northern Chanyu and create Yuchujian as a puppet chanyu
93		The Xiongnu settle in southern Shaanxi
94		Northern Xiongnu refugees numbering 200,000 rebel and name Fenghou, son of Tuntuhe, as their chanyu - they fail to defeat the Southern Xiongnu and flee across the Yellow River to take refuge at Zhuoye Mountain (Gurvan Saikhan Mountains)
96		Ten thousand Northern Xiongnu defect to the Han

== 2nd century ==
Year	Date	Event
104		Fenghou offers to become a Han tributary but does not gain formal acceptance
105		Fenghou offers to become a Han tributary but is rejected
109		Southern Xiongnu rebel
118		Fenghou surrenders to the Han; his followers are resettled in Yingchuan Commandery
123		Qizhijian of the Xianbei defeats the Southern Xiongnu in Wuyuan Commandery
140		The Xiongnu overrun the Tiger's Teeth encampment near Chang'an
188		The Xiuchuge people ousts Qiangqu from power but their replacements fail to hold power; so ends the Southern Xiongnu
189		The wandering Xiongnu chanyu Yufuluo seeks aid from the Han dynasty unsuccessfully and becomes a mercenary
194		Yufuluo dies and is succeeded by his brother Huchuquan

== 3rd century ==
Year	Date	Event
202		Huchuquan is defeated by Cao Cao's officer Zhong Yao and his Xiongnu tribes are settled in Taiyuan Commandery
216		The remnant Xiongnu in the Ordos region is pacified by Cao Wei
284		30,000 Xiongnu submit and settle in Xihe in Shanxi
286		100,000 Xiongnu submit at Yongzhou
290		Liu Yuan is appointed area commander-in-chief of the Five Regions of Xiongnu

== 4th century ==
Year	Date	Event
304		Former Zhao: Liu Yuan of the Xiongnu declares himself Prince of Han (漢)
307		Former Zhao: Shi Le joins Liu Yuan
308		Former Zhao: Liu Yuan takes Pingyang and declares himself emperor
310		Former Zhao: Liu Yao, Shi Le and Wang Mi invade Luoyang, Xuzhou, Yuzhou, and Yanzhou
310		Former Zhao: Liu Yuan dies and his successor Liu He is killed by Liu Cong, who takes over
311		Former Zhao: Sima Yue dies and his funeral procession is ambushed by Shi Le, who annihilates the Jin army
311		Disaster of Yongjia: Liu Yao and Wang Mi sack Luoyang and capture Emperor Huai of Jin
311		Former Zhao: Liu Yao takes Chang'an
311		Former Zhao: Wang Mi is killed by Shi Le
312		Former Zhao: Jin retakes Chang'an after routing Liu Yao
312		Former Zhao: Shi Le captures Xiangguo (襄國) (Xingtai, Hebei)
312		Former Zhao: Liu Cong briefly takes Jinyang (southwest of Taiyuan, Shanxi) but is routed by Liu Kun
313		Emperor Huai of Jin is killed by Liu Cong and is succeeded by Sima Ye (Emperor Min of Jin)
316		Former Zhao: Emperor Min of Jin surrenders Chang'an to Liu Yao
318		Emperor Min of Jin is killed by Liu Cong and is succeeded by Sima Rui (Emperor Yuan of Jin)
318		Former Zhao: Liu Cong dies and his successor Liu Can is killed by Xiongnu general Jin Zhun, and is succeeded by Liu Yao
319		Former Zhao: Jin Zhun is killed
319		Former Zhao: Liu Yao moves to Chang'an and renames his state Zhao
319		Former Zhao: Fu Hong joins Former Zhao
319		Later Zhao: Shi Le defeats Jin general Zu Ti at Xunyi and declares himself Prince of [Later] Zhao
320		Former Zhao: Juqu Zhi rebels and is defeated

== 5th century ==
Year	Date	Event
401		Northern Liang: Juqu Mengxun kills Duan Ye and declares himself Duke of Zhangye
407		Xia: Helian Bobo declares himself Heavenly King
418		Xia (Sixteen Kingdoms): Helian Bobo takes Chang'an
419		Xia (Sixteen Kingdoms): Helian Bobo leaves Chang'an
421		Northern Liang: Juqu Mengxun conquers Western Liang
426		Northern Wei: Attacks Xia
427		Northern Wei: Takes Chang'an and sacks the Xia capital, Tongwan
428		Xia: Retakes Chang'an
431		Xia: Conquers Western Qin and are in turn conquered by the Tuyuhun
439		Northern Wei: Conquers Northern Liang; so ends the Sixteen Kingdoms

== Bibliography ==
- Barfield, Thomas (1989), The Perilous Frontier: Nomadic Empires and China, Basil Blackwell
- Barrett, Timothy Hugh (2008), The Woman Who Discovered Printing, Great Britain: Yale University Press, ISBN 978-0-300-12728-7 (alk. paper)
- Chang, Chun-shu (2007), The Rise of the Chinese Empire 1, The University of Michigan Press
- Cosmo, Nicola Di (2002), Ancient China and Its Enemies, Cambridge University Press
- Cosmo, Nicola di (2009), Military Culture in Imperial China, Harvard University Press
- Crespigny, Rafe (2007), A Biographical Dictionary of Later Han to the Three Kingdoms (23-220 AD), Brill
- Crespigny, Rafe de (2017), Fire Over Luoyang: A History of the Later Han Dynasty, 23-220 AD, Brill
- de Crespigny, Rafe (2010), Imperial Warlord, Brill
- Ebrey, Patricia Buckley; Walthall, Anne; Palais, James B. (2005), East Asia: A Cultural, Social, and Political History, Boston: Houghton Mifflin, ISBN 0-618-13384-4
- Knapp, Ronald G. (1980), China's Island Frontier: Studies in the Historical Geography of Taiwan, The University of Hawaii
- Shin, Michael D. (2014), Korean History in Maps, Cambridge University Press
- Twitchett, Denis (2008), The Cambridge History of China 1, Cambridge University Press
- Xiong, Victor Cunrui (2009), Historical Dictionary of Medieval China, United States of America: Scarecrow Press, Inc., ISBN 978-0810860537
- Whiting, Marvin C. (2002), Imperial Chinese Military History, Writers Club Press
