= Luandi =

Ruling clan of the ancient Xiongnu tribal confederation

The Luandi (simplified Chinese: 挛鞮; traditional Chinese: 攣鞮; pinyin: Luándī; Wade–Giles: Luan-ti; alternatively written as Xulianti simplified Chinese: 虚连题; traditional Chinese: 虛連題; pinyin: Xūliántí) was the ruling clan of the Xiongnu that flourished from the 3rd century BCE to 4th century CE. The form Luandi comes from the Book of Han, while the form Xulianti comes from the Book of Later Han.

== Etymology ==
Lanhai Wei and Hui Li reconstruct the Old Chinese pronunciation of 挛鞮 as *lyuan-tlïγ, evolving from an earlier 虚连题 (*Hala-yundluγ), as a result of a historical sound shift involving the initial dropping of *h- by demonstrating its occurrence in several historical sources. Furthermore, the conjugation of the roots *hala, meaning colorful; *yund meaning horse, *-luγ as the participle suffix would have resulted in the semantic meaning "tribe with skewbald horses" in an early Turkic dialect, allowing it to be further identified with the historical Ulayundluğ tribe. Moreover, the authors argue that the conquest of the same clan by the Xue in the 4th century CE eventually gave birth to the Xueyantuo.

Later, different branches of the Luandi clan adopted Chinese surnames to legitimize their rule. The branch that founded the Han-Zhao dynasty changed its surname to Liu (劉), aligning themselves with the imperial family of the Han dynasty. Conversely, the branch that founded the Hu Xia dynasty adopted the surname Helian (赫連).

Upon establishing the Xia state in 407 CE, the ruler Bobo renounced the Sinicized surname "Liu" in favor of "Helian" as the royal clan name. According to the Book of Jin, he selected these specific characters to construct a folk etymology meaning "connected directly to the heavens" (徽赫與天連), thereby asserting a divine link to his imperial majesty.

However, modern historical linguists generally reject this political wordplay as a secondary rationalization designed to legitimize his rule to Han-Chinese subjects. Instead, scholars identify "Helian" as a phonetic variant or dialectal transcription of Qilian (祁連), which ancient Chinese texts explicitly record as the native Xiongnu word for "sky" or "heaven". Linguists reconstruct this Xiongnu root as an Altaic or Proto-Turkic cognate related to *Kök (sky/blue) or *Kün (sun), directly aligning with the ideopraxis of Tengrism practiced by early Turkic steppe peoples.

Anna Dybo reconstructs the Old Chinese pronunciation of 攣鞮 as *r(h)wan-de and posits that the clan's name, among other lexemes, were borrowed from "one of the Eastern Middle Iranian languages which was similar to a kind of archaic Khotanese Saka", and thus comparable to Khotanese Saka runde, plural of rre from *rwant- "king".

== Status and relation ==
The Luandi held some of the highest positions in the Xiongnu society, including the title of chanyu within the Xiongnu confederacy. In the confederation, Luandi was a paternal dynastic tribe, Huyan was an initially maternal dynastic tribe, and Xubu was a subsequently maternal dynastic tribe. They were the three most prominent tribes ("Houses" in N. Bichurin) in the Xiongnu.

There were four other noble tribes: Huyan, Xubu, Qiulin and Lan. The Huyan belonged to the dominating left wing, and the Lan and the Xubu belonged to the right wing. A source also considered Lan and Luandi as two variants of the same word due to their phonetic similarity. This was also attributed to the way the name Lan was used to identify Xiongnu's supreme rulers.

== Rulers ==
The earliest prominent figure from the clan itself was perhaps their leader Touman. He would be succeeded by his son Modu Chanyu. Later on, the branch of the Luandi clan that founded the Han-Zhao dynasty changed their surname to Liu (劉), the surname of the Han dynasty emperors, while the branch that established the Hu Xia dynasty changed their surname to Helian (赫連).

=== List of rulers ===
- Touman
- Modu Chanyu
- Laoshang
- Junchen
- Yizhixie
- Wuwei Chanyu
- Er Chanyu
- Xulihu
- Qiedihou
- Hulugu
- Huyandi
- Xulüquanqu
- Woyanqudi
- Huhanye
- Fuzhulei Ruodi
- Souxie
- Juya
- Wuzhuliu
- Wulei
- Huduershidaogao
- Wudadihou
- Punu Chanyu
- Youliu
- Northern Chanyu
- Yuchujian

== See also ==
- Tuqi
- Jin Midi
