= Zhizhi =

Supreme ruler of the Xiongnu Empire (d. 36 BCE)

Hutuwusi
- Zhizhi Chanyu
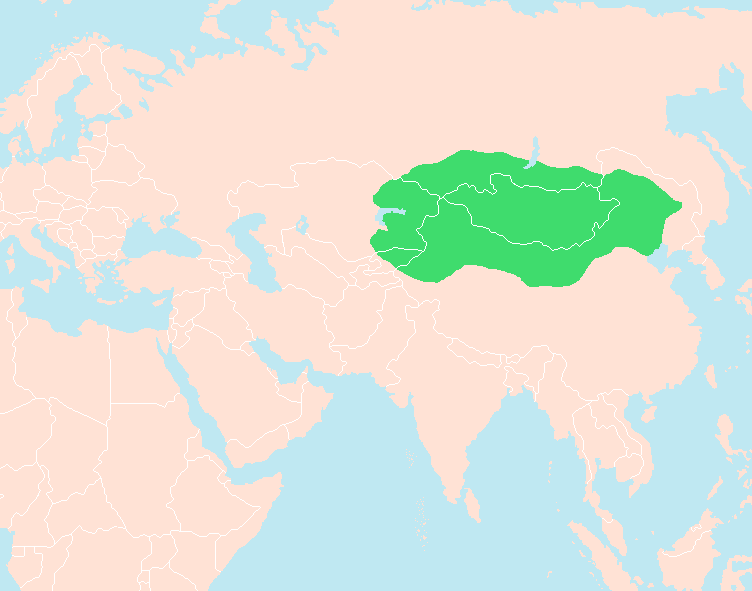
- Domain and influence of the Xiongnu
- Reign: c. 55–36 BCE
- Predecessor: Several claimants
- Successor: None
- Dynasty: Modu Chanyu
- Father: Xulüquanqu

Zhizhi or Chi-Chi (Chinese: 郅支; pinyin: Zhìzhī; Wade–Giles: Chih^{4}-chih^{1}, from Old Chinese (58 BCE): *tśit-kie < *tit-ke; died 36 BCE), also known as Jzh-jzh, was a chanyu (supreme ruler) of the Xiongnu Empire at the time of the first Xiongnu civil war. He held the north and west in contention with his younger brother Huhanye who held the south. His original name in Chinese transcription was Luandi Hutuwusi (Chinese: 攣鞮呼屠吾斯; pinyin: Luándī Hūtúwúsī), i.e. one of the Worthy Princes of the East (of the Luandi clan).

When Hutuwusi's father, Xulüquanqu Chanyu, died in 60 BCE, power was seized by a distant relative, Woyanqudi. In 58 BCE, Huhanye, a younger son of Xulüquanqu, revolted and made himself chanyu. Woyanqudi committed suicide soon after.

In 56 BCE Hutuwusi, elder brother of Huhanye, revolted, called himself Zhizhi Chanyu, and drove Huhanye out of the royal domain. As Zhizhi grew more powerful, Huhanye moved south and submitted to the Chinese in 53 BCE. Huhanye then used Chinese support to strengthen himself against his elder brother. Zhizhi tried to offer tribute to the Chinese and sent his son as hostage, but the Han dynasty favored Huhanye. Growing weaker, in 49 BCE Zhizhi began moving west in the hope of reconstituting his empire. In the same year, Yilimu, a brother of Woyuanqudi, declared himself chanyu and was killed by Zhizhi. He successfully fought the Wusun, gained control of the Dingling and made his capital in the lands of the Jiankun who may have been the Yenisei Kirghiz (these last two are on the southern edge of Siberia).

In 44 BCE he was reported to be on the north slope of the Tian Shan in modern Xinjiang. The Han court returned his hostage son. For unknown reasons, Zhizhi murdered the envoy who accompanied his son. He made a marriage alliance with the rulers of Kangju near Lake Balkhash and led his entire tribe westward. They suffered greatly from cold and only 3,000 people reached Kangju (it is not clear if this was the whole population or only fighting men).

In alliance with the Kangju he plundered the Wusun. Later he quarreled with the Kangju, killed several hundred of them and forced the Kangju people to build him a fortress on the Dulaishui River (possibly the Ili River or the Talas River). He also extracted tribute from Dayuan. It is not clear why Zhizhi wanted a fortress since the great advantage of the Xiongnu was their mobile cavalry. The Chinese commander of the Western Regions began to fear that Zhizhi was planning to build a large empire and launched a preemptive attack.

In 36 BCE, Han generals Chen Tang and Gan Yanshou led a force of 40,000 into battle against the Xiongnu and their Kangju allies. They reached Wusun territory and then advanced on Kangju. A Kangju raiding party attacked them and took their wagons, but a counterattack drove off their forces, and the Han army was able to recover their supply train. Upon reaching Kangju (around modern Taraz), the army started constructing a fortified camp, but the Xiongnu attacked them. After driving off the Xiongnu with crossbows, they secured their camp and advanced on the enemy city with a shield and spear formation in front and crossbowmen behind. The crossbowmen rained down on the defenders manning the walls until they fled, then the spearmen drained the moat and started stacking firewood against the palisade. A Kangju relief force made several attacks on the Han position at night, delaying the assault and allowing the defenders to repair their walls. When the Han army attacked, the city fell with ease and Zhizhi Chanyu was killed and decapitated. Zhizhi's head was then brought to Chang'an and presented to Emperor Yuan of Han.

During the battle, an infantry unit on the Kangju side used a formation described as having the appearance of fish scales, which has caused speculation that they were Greek Hoplites from the Kingdom of Dayuan. Evidence is inconclusive.

== See also ==
- Huyan
