= Diao Chan (film) =

1938 Chinese film by Bu Wancang

- American promotional film poster

Chinese name
- Traditional Chinese: 貂蟬
- Simplified Chinese: 貂蝉
Transcriptions
Standard Mandarin
- Hanyu Pinyin: Diāo Chán
- Directed by: Bu Wancang
- Written by: Chen Dabei; Bu Wancang
- Produced by: Zhang Shankun
- Starring: Gu Lanjun; Jin Shan
- Music by: Huang Yijun
- Production companies: Xinhua Film Company; Hsin Hwa Motion Picture Company
- Release date: June 15, 1938 (Hong Kong)
- Running time: 87 minutes
- Country: China
- Language: Mandarin

Diao Chan (traditional Chinese: 貂蟬; simplified Chinese: 貂蝉), also known as Sable Cicada, is a 1938 Chinese sound film directed by Bu Wancang and produced by Zhang Shankun's Xinhua Film Company. The film is a portrayal of one of the "Four Beauties" of ancient China, in this case the titular Diaochan, from the late Eastern Han dynasty era. Like Diaochan, the film is also known by the literal translation of her name, the Sable Cicada.

The film, a lavish historical costume drama, represented something of a revival of Chinese filmmaking in Shanghai following the occupation of the city by Japanese forces. Under the aegis of the Xinhua Film Company, Diao Chan's success allowed for significant output of wartime films from Chinese studios during the "Solitary Island" period of the late 1930s and early 1940s.

== Cast ==
- Gu Lanjun as Diaochan
- Jin Shan as Lü Bu
- Gu Eryi as Dong Zhuo
- Wei Heling as Wang Yun
- Tang Jie as Li Jue

== Production history ==
Production of Diao Chan, a historical epic based on the life of one of the legendary Four Beauties of China, began in January 1937 under director Bu Wancang for the Xinhua Film Company. Originally the film was to be part of an ambitious plan to release a film based on each beauty: Diao Chan, Xi Shi, Wang Zhaojun, and Yang Guifei, though only Diao Chan was ever made. With 90% of shooting complete, however, the production was shut down with the outbreak of the Second Sino-Japanese War. As a result of Japanese bombing of Shanghai, nearly all the film sets were destroyed, and most of the cast fled to the country's interior.

With the reopening of the Xinhua Film Company in late 1937, the company found itself in the center of Shanghai's "Solitary Island." The company's head, Zhang Shankun announced that despite the fact the film was incomplete (and Shanghai's film infrastructure in shambles), the release of Diao Chan would relaunch Shanghai's "Hollywood of the East." Zhang therefore moved production to Hong Kong, renting the Nanyue Studio in Hong Kong) a far more expensive undertaking than filming in Shanghai), and flying most of the cast to Hong Kong from the interior, not to mention transporting equipment from Shanghai.

Using the Hong Kong studio (and Hong Kong extras), the production was completed in April 1938.

== Reception ==
Zhang invested heavily in the film's publicity in both Shanghai and Hong Kong, declaring the film as China's first big-budget historical epic. Zhang's gamble in the expensive production and publicity would soon pay off, as Diao Chan became a commercial success in both Shanghai and Hong Kong, and was even screened in Shanghai's Grand Theater, which had heretofore been reserved for first-run American-made features.

Zhang then distributed the film to the United States, where it played mainly in the Chinatowns of New York City and San Francisco.

More importantly, the film renewed the fortunes of Zhang Shankun's Xinhua Film Company, which was able to sign on important talent in Shanghai. The success of the film also led to the production of one of the most important and most successful films of the Solitary Island period, Bu Wancang's Mulan Joins the Army.

== See also ==
- List of media adaptations of Romance of the Three Kingdoms
