= Qiulin =

Xiongnu royal tribe

Qiulin (Chinese: 丘林 < LHC: *kʰu-lim < *khwə-rəm) was the name of a royal tribe in Xiongnu from the Han dynasty to Northern Wei.

== History ==
Xiongnu contained five tribes: Luandi, Xubu, Huyan, Lan and Qiulin. Luandi produced the rulers of Xiongnu, while other tribes produced empresses.

During the Northern Wei, the Qiulin emigrated to Luyang, Henan. Following the Chinese assimilation policy of Emperor Xiaowen, the Xiongnu of Qiulin took the surname Lin (林). The family became a branch of Liu family of Han Zhao.

== See also ==
- Han-Zhao
