= Gan Yanshou =

Chinese military official

Gan Yanshou (甘延壽) was a governor and military commander of the Western Han dynasty (202 BC – 9 AD). He is best known for his governance and protection of the Western Regions, and his military efforts against Zhihzi, the chanyu (supreme ruler) of the Xiongnu Empire at the time of the first Xiongnu civil war, whom he and his deputy commander, Chen Tang, ultimately defeated at the Talas river in 36 BC, in what came to be known as the Battle Of Zhihzi.

== Life ==
Gan was from Beidi (modern Qingyang).

In his youth he practiced horse riding and archery, apparently becoming exceptionally skilled at both. He worked as a governor for many years before eventually retiring, only to be recommended to the emperor, and assigned protectorate of the Western regions. Following his success alongside Chen Tang at the Battle Of Zhihzi, he was appointed "Protector-General" and granted the title Marquis of Yicheng.
