= Huhanye =

Chanyu of the Xiongnu Empire from 59 to 31 BC

Jihoushan
- Huhanye Chanyu
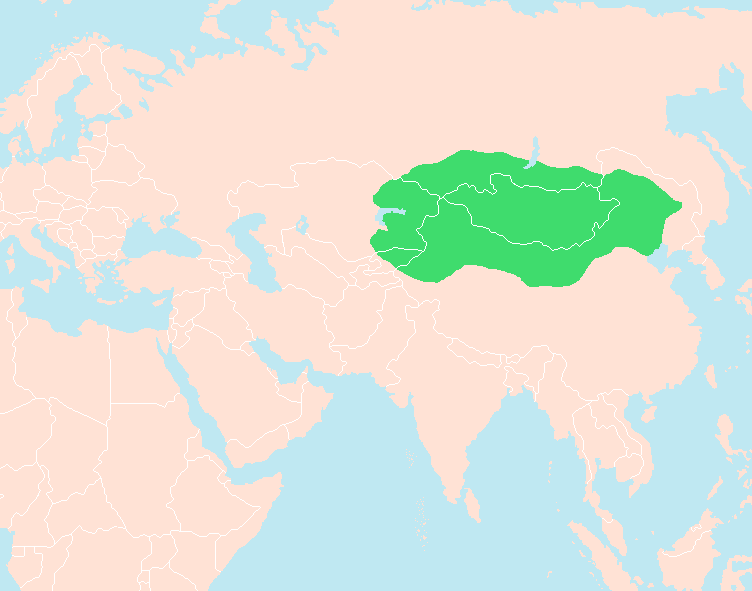
- Domain and influence of the Xiongnu
- Reign: c. 59–31 BC
- Predecessor: Woyanqudi Chanyu
- Successor: Fuzhulei Ruodi
- Spouse: Wang Zhaojun
- Dynasty: Modu Chanyu
- Father: Xulüquanqu Chanyu

Huhanye (Chinese: 呼韓邪), born Jihoushan (Chinese: 稽侯狦), was a chanyu of the Xiongnu Empire, the son of Xulüquanqu Chanyu. He rebelled in 59 BC with the aid of Wushanmu and Woyanqudi Chanyu soon committed suicide, leaving the Xiongnu torn apart by factional strife. By 55 BC, only Huhanye and his brother Zhizhi Chanyu were left.

== Biography ==
By the time that the tyrannical Woyanqudi Chanyu was killed in 58 BC, the already weakened Xiongnu confederacy had fragmented into several factions warring against each other, among them were the two sons of Woyanqudi's predecessor Huhanye and Zhizhi. The two brothers fought against each other, and Huhanye was defeated by Zhizhi in 51 BC. He fled south and submitted to the Han dynasty, travelled to Chang'an to visit Emperor Xuan, who allowed his tribe to settle in the Yinshan area. Zhizhi also submitted to the Han the following year, but declared independence in 48 BC once he saw that they favored Huhanye, and moved further west to attack Fergana and the Wusun. In 43 BC, Huhanye moved back north. Zhizhi was killed by the Han at the Battle of Zhizhi in 36 BC, leaving Huhanye the uncontested leader of the Xiongnu.

In 33 BC, Huhanye visited Chang'an as part of the tributary system that existed between the Han and Xiongnu governments. He took the opportunity to request to become an imperial son-in-law. Unwilling to honour Huhanye with a real princess, Emperor Yuan ordered that the plainest girl in the palace be selected. A lady-in-waiting named Wang Zhaojun volunteered and the Emperor approved. However, Wang Zhaojun was revealed to be exceedingly beautiful (and was portraited to be plain by the selection painter, whom she did not bribe) and is considered one of the Four Beauties of ancient China, alongside Xi Shi, Diaochan, and Yang Guifei.

Wang Zhaojun became a favorite of Huhanye Chanyu, giving birth to two sons. Only one, Yituzhiyashi, was recorded to have survived, and was involved in politics. They also had two daughters, Yun known as Subu Juci and Dangyu Juci. Yun was created Princess Yimuo and would later become a powerful figure in Xiongnu politics. Huhanye died in 31 BC and was succeeded by his son Diaotaomogao.

== Family ==
=== Wives ===
- Lady Da Yanzhi (大阏氏)
  - Fuzhulei Ruodi Chanyu (复株絫若鞮单于; r. 31–20 BC)
  - Souxie Chanyu (搜谐单于; r. 20–12 BC)
  - Wulei Chanyu (乌累若鞮单于; r. 13–18 AD)
  - Prince Xian of Zuo (左贤王)
- Lady Zhuanqu Yanzhi (颛渠阏氏)
  - Juya Chanyu (车牙单于; r. 12–8 BC)
  - Wuzhuliu Chanyu (乌珠留单; r. 8 BC–13 AD)
- Lady Tuqi Yanzhi (屠耆阏氏)
  - Prince Xian of You (右贤王)
- Lady Diwu Yanzhi (第五阏氏)
  - Huduershidaogao Chanyu (呼都而尸道皋若鞮单于)
- Lady Wang Zhaojun (王昭君)
  - Prince Yituzhiyashi (伊屠智牙師)
  - Another Prince

== Footnotes ==
Preceded by Woyanqudi	Chanyu of the Xiongnu Empire; 59–31 BC	Succeeded by Fuzhulei Ruodi
