= Lan (surname 兰) =

Chinese family name

Lan (兰/蘭)
- Pronunciation: Lán (Mandarin)
- Language: Chinese

Origin
- Language: Old Chinese
- Meaning: Orchid

Lan is the Mandarin pinyin and Wade–Giles romanization of the Chinese surname written 兰 in simplified Chinese and 蘭 in traditional Chinese. As of 2008, it is the 154th most common surname in China, shared by 840,000 people. Lan 蘭 is not listed in the Song dynasty classic text Hundred Family Surnames.

The people of the Xiongnu Lan (tribe) assimilated into Han Chinese culture and were given the surname Lan.

== Notable people surnamed Lan ==
This is a Chinese name, meaning the surname is stated before the given name, though Chinese persons living in Western countries will often put their surname after their given name.

- Consort Lan (兰淑仪; 4th century), mother of Murong Chui, founding emperor of Later Yan
- Lan Han (蘭汗; died 398), Later Yan official who briefly usurped the throne
- Princess Lan (蘭王妃; 4th–5th century), wife of Murong Sheng, emperor of Later Yan
- Lan Qin (蘭欽), Liang dynasty general
- Lan Jing (蘭京; died 549), son of Lan Qin, assassinated Gao Cheng, emperor of Northern Qi
- Lan Mao (蘭茂; 1397–1470) Ming dynasty poet and author on medicine, who is the namesake of the fungal genus Lanmaoa
- Lan Dixi (蘭第錫; 1736–1797), Qing dynasty Vice Minister of War
- Lan Pu (兰浦; 19th century), Qing dynasty author
- Lan Fu (兰馥; 1885–1964), general of the Yunnan clique
- Lan Xichun (兰锡纯; 1907–1995), pioneering surgeon
- Lan Lijun (兰立俊), Chinese ambassador to Indonesia, Canada, and Sweden
- Lan Shili (兰世立; born 1966), founder and former CEO of East Star Airlines
- Lan Xuan (蘭萱; born 1966), Taiwanese TV presenter
- Lan Wei (蘭衛; born 1968), Olympic diver
- Lan Boning (兰泊宁; born 1971), novelist
- Lan Ya Ming (兰雅明; 1972–2002), Chinese teacher and murder victim who was killed in Singapore
- Lan Xiaolong (兰晓龙; born 1973), screenwriter and novelist
- Lan Lixin (兰丽新; born 1979), middle-distance runner
- Lan Yu (兰玉; born 1986), fashion designer
- Lan Xing (兰兴; born 1990), Olympic shooter
- Lan Xiya (兰西雅; born 1998), Chinese actress and singer
