= Huyan Zan =

Chinese military general

- Family name: Hūyán (呼延); Given name: Zàn (贊)
- from one 1892 print of the novel Legends of Generals of the Yang Family (楊家將傳) (Note: Essentially the same novel, with slight modifications by publishers and editors, as the second half of Records of the Two Songs, South and North (兩宋南北志傳) written by Xiong Damu (熊大木) in the late 16th century.)
- Died: 1000; Kaifeng, Henan
- Occupation: Military general
- Children: Huyan Bixing (呼延必興), son; Huyan Bigai (呼延必改), son; Huyan Biqiu (呼延必求), son; Huyan Bixian (呼延必顯), son
- Parent(s): Huyan Cong (呼延琮), father

Huyan Zan
- Traditional Chinese: 呼延贊
- Simplified Chinese: 呼延赞
Transcriptions
Standard Mandarin
- Hanyu Pinyin: Hūyán Zàn
- Wade–Giles: Hu^{1}-yen^{2} Tsan^{4}
Yue: Cantonese
- Yale Romanization: Fu^{1}-yin^{4} Jaan^{3}
- Jyutping: Fu^{1}-jin^{4} Zaan^{3}

Huyan Zan (呼延贊) (died 1000) was a Chinese military general in the early years of the Northern Song dynasty. He participated in the Northern Song's conquest of the Later Shu in 964-965 and the Northern Han in 979. Later he helped defend Song's northern border against the Khitan-ruled Liao dynasty.

His surname Huyan suggests Xiongnu origins. A fierce warrior, Huyan Zan is known for tattooing the words "fervently kill the enemies" (赤心殺賊) all over his body, as well as on that of his wife and servants.

== Military career ==
Born in a military family, Huyan Zan started his career as a cavalryman in the Song dynasty army. Emperor Taizu of Song recognized Huyan's talent and promoted him to the rank of a commissioner of the imperial cavalry (驍雄軍使).

In 964, Huyan followed general Wang Quanbin (王全斌) to invade the Later Shu Kingdom as a vanguard general. He was wounded several times in battle and later promoted to deputy command commissioner (副指揮使) for his contributions in ending Later Shu.

During the reign of Emperor Taizong, Huyan was further promoted to a command commissioner of armoured cavalry (鐵騎軍指揮使). In the campaign to invade the Northern Han Kingdom in 979, Huyan charged ahead of his men and was among the first to climb the defensive wall of Northern Han's capital Taiyuan. He fell from the wall 4 times and was injured, but he continued attempting to scale the wall. For his bravery, Huyan was rewarded with gold and silk by Emperor Taizong in the imperial court.

In 982, Huyan assisted Cui Han (崔翰) in defending Dingzhou against the Liao dynasty. He demonstrated great courage, fully committed to die in battle.

At the recommendation of Cui, Huyan was appointed deputy armed leader of cavalry and infantry (馬步軍副都軍頭) in 987. During marches, he often presented self-drawn maps to the commander, while providing advice on setting up camp. He constantly expressed his desire to be sent to the frontier. Emperor Taizong summoned Huyan Zan and ordered him to perform his skills in front of him. Huyan Zan and his four sons - all with the words "forget family for the nation outside of home" (出門忘家為國) and "disregard death for the emperor in battle" (臨陣忘死為主) tattooed behind both ears - dressed up in full armour and performed martial arts in front of an audience. Emperor Taizong was very pleased and he rewarded them with gold and expensive garments.

In 989, Huyan Zan was appointed Governor (刺史) of Fuzhou (富州). After the Song army launched several disastrous campaigns against the Khitan-led Liao dynasty, in 992, Huyan Zan became Governor of Baozhou (保州) and Deputy Commander (副都部署) of Jizhou (冀州). However, Huyan Zan was not competent in managing logistics so he was reappointed Governor of Liaozhou (遼州刺史). Even after switching appointment, Huyan Zan showed that he was not good in governing a civilian population so he was reappointed Governor of Fuzhou (扶州) and Drill Instructor (團練使) of Kangzhou (康州). During his tenure (992–997) he reinvigorated the defense of the border region and held off numerous Liao attacks. In 997, he resigned from his post after the death of Emperor Taizong.

== Later life ==
In 999 Huyan Zan was appointed by Emperor Zhenzong as Inspector of the Palace Interior and Exterior (宮內外都巡檢). At that time, Emperor Zhenzong was seeking someone to be an army commander and many officials started fighting for the post. Huyan Zan said, "I draw a salary of thousands each month but my expenses are not even half of my salary, so I'm already very satisfied with my current pay. I questioned myself and felt that I haven't done anything to repay my country so I do not dare to seek any further promotions. I'm worried that I'll meet with a calamity one day if my fortune keeps increasing." Huyan Zan's humility impressed many people. The following year, Huyan Zan was tasked with guarding the garden of Empress Dowager Li, but died during service. One son, Huyan Bixian (呼延必顯), succeeded his father as deputy armed leader.

== In fiction ==
- Huyan Zan features as a supporting character in the Generals of the Yang Family legends, where he is described as a close friend of the Yang family. In these largely fictionalized stories, his weapons are a pair of clubs.
- The stories of Huyan Zan's descendants were compiled into a novel titled Shuo Hu Quan Zhuan (說呼全傳; Full Chronicles of the Tales of Hu). Alternative titles include Shuo Hu (說呼; Tales of Hu), Hu Jia Jiang (呼家將; Generals of the Hu Family), Hu Jia Hou Dai Quan Zhuan (呼家後代全傳; Full Chronicles of the Hu Family Descendants) and Jin Bian Ji (金鞭記; Story of the Golden Clubs). The novel is similar to, but not as popular as, other works on famous military generals of the Song dynasty, such as Generals of the Yang Family and Shuo Yue Quanzhuan (說岳全傳). Its story was adopted as a case in the 1994 Hong Kong Asia Television series Justice Pao titled "The Iron Hill Tomb" (鐵丘墳).
- Huyan Zhuo, a character in the Chinese classical novel Water Margin, is a fictitious descendant of Huyan Zan. He also wields two clubs.

== Sources ==
- (in Chinese) Toqto'a; et al. (1346). Song Shi (宋史) [History of Song].
- (in Chinese) Li Tao (1183). Xu Zizhi Tongjian Changbian (續資治通鑑長編) [Extended Continuation to Zizhi Tongjian].
