= Wang Zhaojun =

One of the Four Beauties of ancient China

Wang Zhaojun 王昭君
- First Lady of Hun Peace
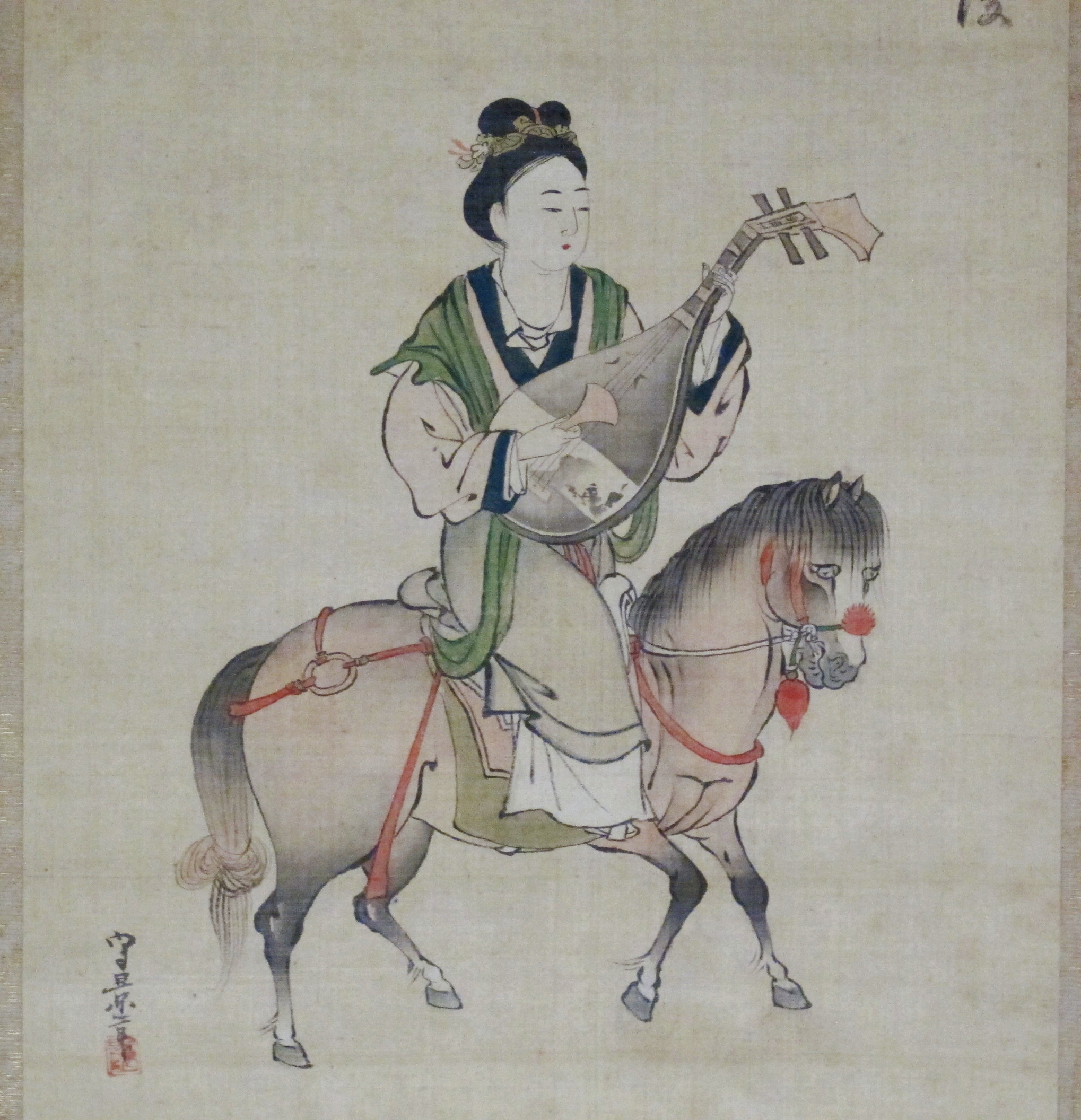
- Born: c. 51 BCE
- Died: 15 BCE (aged 35–36)
- Spouse: Emperor Yuan of Han; Huhanye; Fuzhulei Ruodi
- Issue: Prince Yituzhiyashi; 1 other son; 4 other daughters
Names
- Wang Qiang

Chinese name
- Traditional Chinese: 王嬙
- Simplified Chinese: 王嫱
Transcriptions
Standard Mandarin
- Wade–Giles: Wang^{1} Ch'ang^{2}

Courtesy name
- Chinese: 王昭君
Transcriptions
Standard Mandarin
- Hanyu Pinyin: Wáng Zhāojūn
- Wade–Giles: Wang^{1} Ch'ao^{2}-ch'un^{1}

Wang Qiang (c. 51–15 BCE), courtesy name Wang Zhaojun, was one of the Four Beauties of ancient China. Born in Baoping Village, Zigui County (modern-day Hubei Province) in the Western Han dynasty, she was sent by Emperor Yuan to marry Chanyu Huhanye of the Xiongnu Empire in order to establish friendly relations with the Han dynasty through marriage.

In the most prevalent version of the "Four Beauties" legend, it is said that Wang Zhaojun left her hometown on horseback on a bright autumn morning and began a journey northward. Along the way, the horse neighed, making Zhaojun extremely sad and unable to control her emotions. As she sat on the saddle, she began to play sorrowful melodies on a pipa (a Chinese lute). A flock of geese flying southward heard the music, and saw the beautiful young woman riding the horse; they immediately forgot to flap their wings, and fell to the ground. From then on, Zhaojun acquired the nickname "fells geese" or "drops birds".

== Life ==
=== Entering the harem ===
Wang was born to a prominent family of Baopin Village, Zigui County (now Zhaojun Village, Xingshan County, Hubei) in the south of the Western Han empire. As she was born when her father was very old, he regarded her as "a pearl in the palm". Wang Zhaojun was endowed with dazzling beauty with an extremely intelligent mind. She was adept at playing the pipa and also mastered the ancient "Four Arts of the Chinese Scholar" – the guqin, go, calligraphy and Chinese painting.

In 36 BC, Emperor Yuan of Han chose his concubines from the whole state. Because of Wang's fame in the county, she was his first choice as concubine Nan County. Emperor Yuan issued an edict that Wang should enter his harem soon. Wang's father said that his daughter was too young to enter the harem, but could not violate the decree. Wang left her hometown and entered the harem of Emperor Yuan in early summer. According to the custom in the palace, when choosing a new wife, the Emperor was first presented with portraits of all the candidate women. It is said that because of Wang's confidence of beauty and temperament, she refused to bribe the artist Mao Yanshou as the other maids did. As a reprisal, Mao Yanshou painted a mole of widowed tears on Wang's portrait. As a result, during her time in the Lateral Courts, Wang Zhaojun was never visited by the Emperor and remained as a palace lady-in-waiting. Wang Zhaojun's portrait was either never viewed by the Emperor or was inaccurate, and therefore the Emperor overlooked her.

=== Departing for the frontier ===
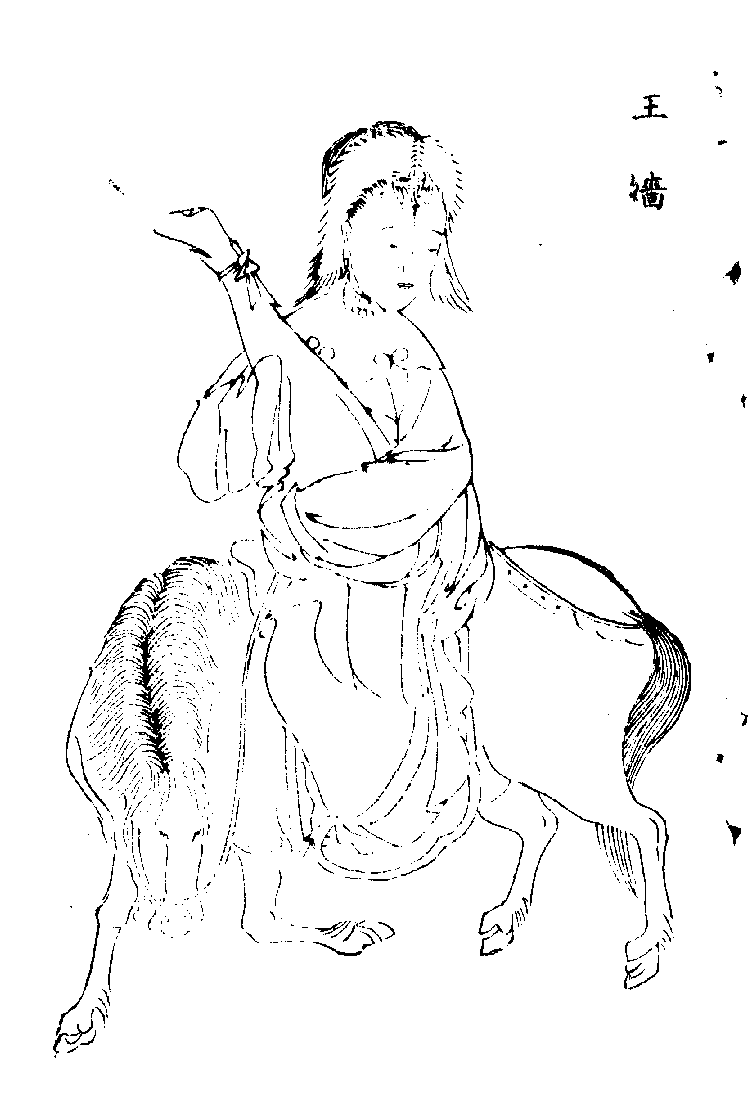
1772 image of Wang Zhaojun

In 33 BC, Huhanye visited Chang'an as part of the tributary system that existed between the Han and Xiongnu governments. He took the opportunity to request to become an imperial son-in-law, which is recorded by Lou Jingde.

Typically the daughter of a concubine would then be offered, but unwilling to honour Huhanye with a real princess, Emperor Yuan ordered that the plainest girl in the harem be selected. He asked for volunteers and promised to present her as his own daughter. The idea of leaving their homeland and comfortable life at court for the grasslands of the far and unknown north was abhorrent to most of the young women, but Wang Zhaojun accepted. When the matron of the harem sent her unflattering portrait to the Emperor, he merely glanced at it and nodded his approval. Only when summoned to court was Wang Zhaojun's beauty revealed.

The Emperor considered retracting his decision, but it was too late by then, and he regretfully presented Wang Zhaojun to Huhanye, who was delighted. Relations with the Xiongnu subsequently improved, and artist Mao Yanshou was subsequently executed for deceiving the Emperor.

=== Life with the Xiongnu ===
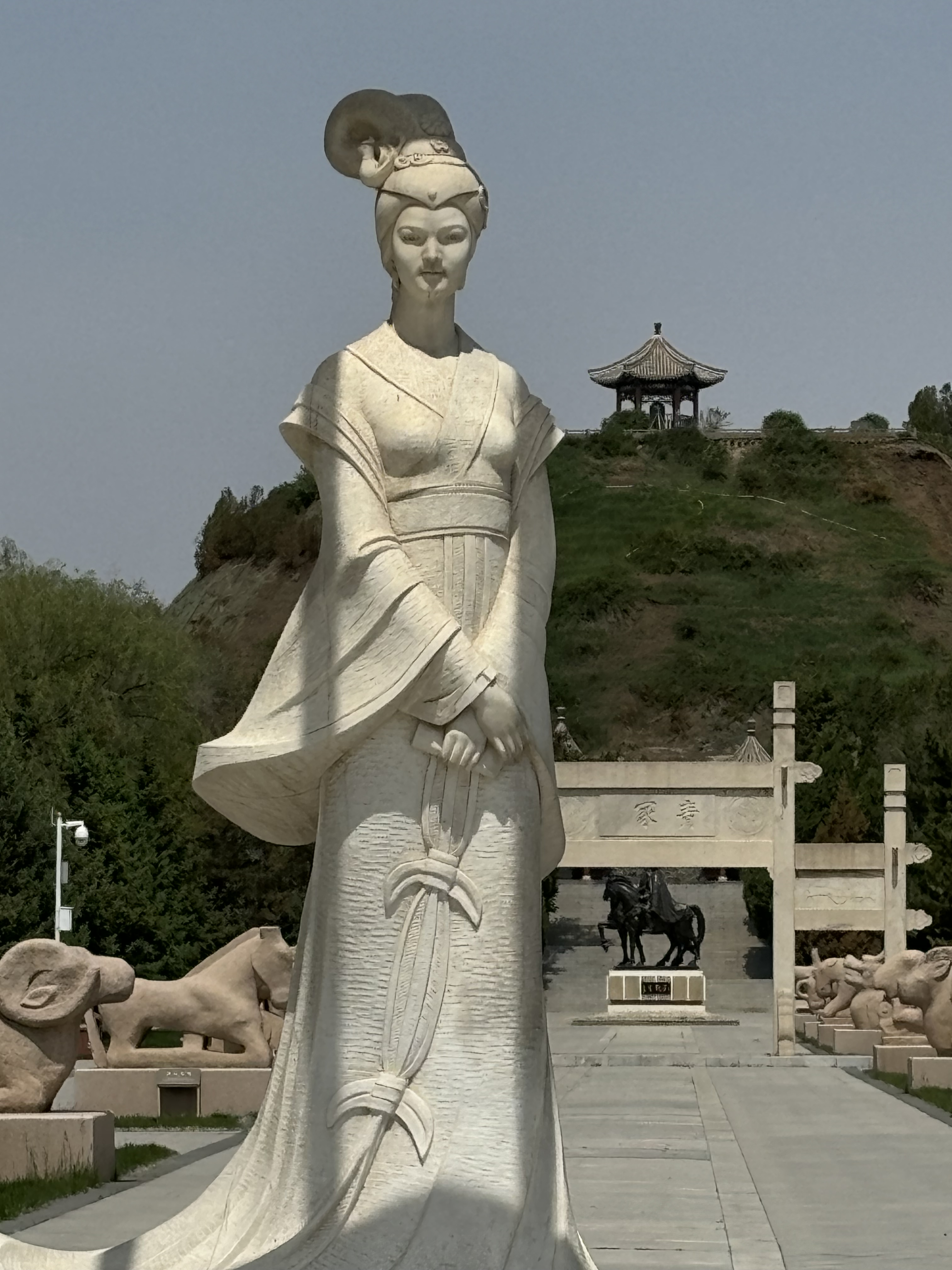
Zhaojun Tomb

Wang Zhaojun became a favourite of Huhanye Chanyu, giving birth to two sons. Only one, Yituzhiyashi (伊屠智牙師), seems to have survived. They also had two daughters, Yun (雲) known as Subu Juci (须卜居次) and Dangyu Juci (当于居次). Yun was created Princess Yimuo and would later become a powerful figure in Xiongnu politics.

When Huhanye died in 31 BC, Wang Zhaojun requested to return to China. Emperor Cheng, however, ordered that she follow Xiongnu levirate custom and become the wife of the next Chanyu, the eldest son (or her stepson, born by her husband's first wife) of her husband. In her new marriage, she had two daughters. Wang was honoured as Ninghu Yanzhi (寧胡閼氏; 'Hu-Pacifying Chief-Consort').

== Cultural legacy ==
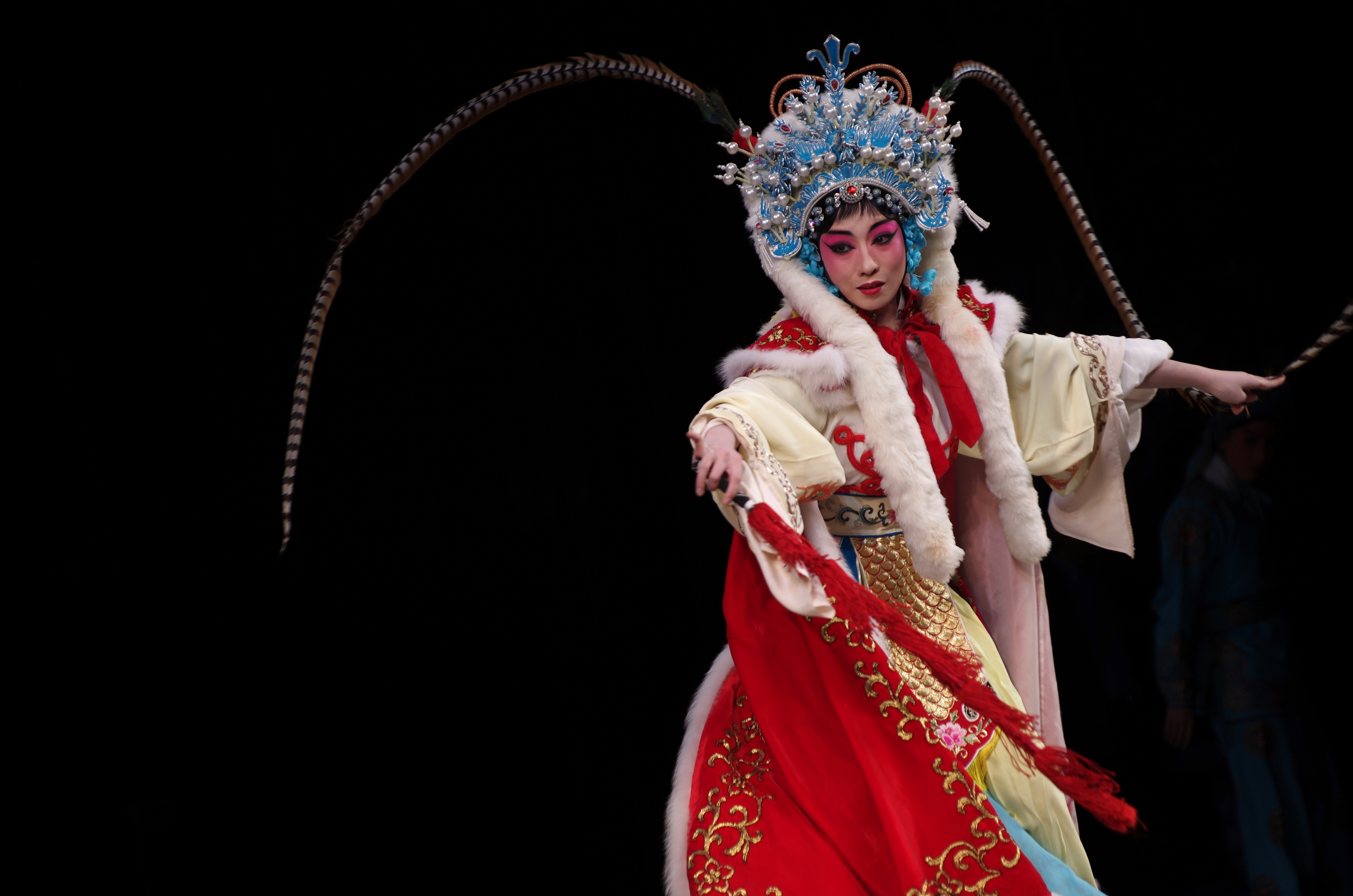
A Peking opera actress portrays Wang Zhaojun during a performance by Shanghai Jingju Theatre Company on December 20, 2014, in Tianchan Theatre, Shanghai, China.

Statistics show that there are about 700 poems and songs and 40 kinds of stories and folktales about Wang Zhaojun from more than 500 famous writers, both ancient (Shi Chong, Li Bai, Du Fu, Bai Juyi, Li Shangyin, Zhang Zhongsu, Cai Yong, Wang Anshi, Yelü Chucai) and modern (Guo Moruo, Cao Yu, Tian Han, Jian Bozan, Fei Xiaotong, Lao She, Chen Zhisui).

=== Literature ===
- Chapter novel: You Feng Qi Yuan
- Variety Plays (known as Zaju in China) in Yuan Dynasty: Han Gong Qiu
- Biography in Ming Dynasty: He Rong Ji
- Han Shu, Xiongnu Zhuan (first known account of Wang Zhaojun)
- Qin Cao ("Principle of the Lute") by Cai Yong (c. 2nd century)
- Xijing Zaji ("Sundry Accounts of the Western Capital") (c. 3rd century)
- Han Gong Qiu ("The Autumn in the Palace of Han") by Ma Zhiyuan (c. 13th century)
- Wang Zhaojun by Guo Moruo (1923)
- Wang Zhaojun by Cao Yu (1978)
- Imperial Lady by Andre Norton and Susan Schwartz (1990)
- Chapter 3, "Naturalizing National Unity: Political Romance and the Chinese Nation," of The Mongols at China's Edge by Uradyn E. Bulag (2002) contains a detailed discussion of variants of the Wang Zhaojun legend.

=== Film, television and music ===
- Beyond The Great Wall (1964), Hong Kong film produced by Shaw Brothers. Linda Lin Dai played Wang Zhaojun.
- Wang Zhaojun (1984), Hong Kong TV series on Asia Television, starring Bonnie Ngai (Wei Qiuhua 魏秋樺) and produced by Amy Wong (Wang Xinwei 王心慰).
- Wang Zhaojun (1988), Taiwanese TV series on CTV, directed by Zhou You. Song Gangling played Wang Zhaojun.
- Wang Zhaojun (2005), TV series by China Central Television (CCTV) and China Television Media, Ltd. Yang Mi played Wang Zhaojun.
- Zhaojun Chu Sai (2006), TV series by China Central Television (CCTV). Li Caihua played Wang Zhaojun.
- "Wang Zhaojun", song by Yang Yang

== See also ==
- Xi Shi
- Diaochan
- Yang Guifei
