= Lan (tribe) =

The Lan (Chinese: 蘭) tribe was one of the five member tribes of the Xiongnu people who lived during the Han dynasty in Northern Wei.

== History ==
The Xiongnu people had five tribes: Luandi, Xubu, Huyan, Lan, and Qiulin. According to the Chinese assimilation policy of Xiaowen, the Xiongnu of Lan get the surname Lan (蘭). Their families are part of the Liu family of Han-Zhao.

== See also ==
- Lan (surname 兰)
