= Xubu =

One of the ruling clans of the ancient Xiongnu confederation

The Xubu (Chinese: 須卜; pinyin: Xūbǔ; Wade–Giles: Hsü-pu; LHC: *sio-pok) was a tribe of the Xiongnu that flourished between 3rd century BCE and the 4th century CE. Chinese annals noted that the Xubu tribe replaced the Huyan tribe, which was an earlier maternal dynastic tribe of the dynastic union with the paternal dynastic tribe Luandi. The traditional system of conjugal unions is a form of the nomadic exogamic society. The male members of the maternal dynastic line were not eligible to be chanyu, only the male members of the Luandi line, whose father was a Luanti Chanyu, and mother was a Xubu Khatun (Queen) were eligible to be chanyu. A Xubu could only become a chanyu after a palace coup.

The Huyan tribe moved from the Right (Western) Wing, where the maternal dynastic tribe is traditionally assigned, to the Left (Eastern) Wing. The Book of the Later Han (chapter 89, l. 7b) stated that of the noble tribes other than Luanti, Huyan, Xubu, Qiulin and Lan, Huyan already belonged to the dominating Left Wing, and Lan and Xubu belonged to the Right Wing. The Book of the Later Han also names the dynastic Luandi tribe with a composite name Xulianti, implying a merger of the two dynastic lines.

Xubu was a tribe that held some of the highest positions in the Eastern Xiongnu society, including the position of Khatun within the tribal confederacy, and the State Judge. A male head of the Xubu tribe held the third highest position in the state, Right Tuqi-prince. In that position, the Right Tuqi-prince managed the daily affairs of the state, headed a considerable division of the army, was a first adviser to the chanyu, and managed foreign relations. Frequently, the Right Tuqi-prince was sent as a personal envoy of the chanyu to resolve difficult international problems, the Chinese annals often mention the Right Tuqi-prince in that capacity.

The earliest annalistic record that mentioned a Xiongnu prince by name refers to the events of 121 BCE, when Yuli Prince Hunxie killed Prince Xiutu and led 40,000 cavalry to surrender to the Han Empire, establishing a 200,000 Xubu population in Northern China.

== See also ==
- Chunwei
- Zubu
