= Huyan =

Chinese noble house

- Huyan in regular script
- Pronunciation: Hūyǎn (Pinyin)
- Language: Chinese

Origin
- Language: Xiongnu language
- Derivation: name of the earliest matrilineal ancestor of the Huyan clan

The Huyan (Chinese: 呼延; Wade–Giles: Hu-yen; LHC: *ha^{(C)}-jan < Old Chinese (~200 BCE): *hɑ-jan^{H/B}) was a noble house that led the last remnants of the Northern Xiongnu to Dzungaria in the second century after the Battle of the Altai Mountains.

The House of Huyan emerged during the political organization that came under Modu's reign which saw the Xiongnu reach its apogee. It is an earlier maternal lineage name subsequently replaced by Xubu, much as the Ashina and Yujiulu. The Mongol Khiyad tribe's name is probably derived from Huyan.

By the 3rd century BCE, the upper stratum of the Xiongnu was made up of five aristocratic houses, Luandi (house of the chanyu and the tuqi king of the east and west), Huyan, Xubu, Qiulin and Lan. Both the Huyan and Xubu settled in the east, Qiulin and Lan in the west and Luandi in modern-day central Mongolia.

Around the first century BCE, a supreme administrative council dominated the upper Xiongnu hierarchy and this was composed of six top-ranking nobles, which included the "Rizhu kings" of the Left and Right. These titles were later transferred to the Huyan clan, which became influential due its close relationship with the royal family by way of marriage.

Historical record also cited a Huyan tribe called Barkol, which attacked and demolished the Yiwu garrison of the Han dynasty in 151.

== Prominent people with family name Huyan ==
- Empress Huyan, wife of Han-Zhao's founding emperor, Liu Yuan
- Empress Huyan, wife of Liu Yuan's son, Liu Cong, the fourth emperor of Han-Zhao
- Empress Huyan, wife of Murong Chao, emperor of the Southern Yan
- Huyan Yan, general and minister of Han-Zhao
- Huyan Zan, general of the Song dynasty (d. 1000)
- Huyan Zhuo, fictitious descendant of Huyan Zan in Water Margin, one of the Four Great Classical Novels
