= Chen Tang (general) =

Chinese military general

Chen Tang (Chinese: 陳湯), born in Jining, Shandong, was a Chinese military general of the Western Han dynasty. He was famous for his battle against Zhizhi in 36 BC during the Han–Xiongnu War.

== Battle of Zhizhi ==
At approximately 36 BC, the governor of the Western Regions was Gan Yanshou. His deputy commander, Chen Tang claimed that Zhizhi was planning to build up a great empire and proposed a pre-emptive attack. Gan Yanshou objected; but he soon fell ill, and while he was incapacitated Chen Tang forged an edict in Yanshou's name and mobilized the army. Gan Yanshou was forced to yield. All this was done without the Emperor's permission. An army of 40,000 Han and Hu troops (''Hu" here is a loose term for non-Chinese) assembled. It marched west on both sides of the Tarim Basin, reunited near Kashgar and moved across Kangju territory reaching the western shore of Lake Balkhash. At this point a party of several thousand Kangju cavalrymen, returning from a raid on Wusun, stumbled onto the rear of the Chinese army, attacked it, and made off with a large quantity of food and weapons. Chen Tang sent his Hu troops back and defeated the Kangju, killing 460 of them and freeing 470 Wusun captives.

1,518 Xiongnu died, including Zhizhi and Zhizhi's wives. 145 were captured and well over 1,000 surrendered. The soldiers were allowed to keep their booty and the surrendered Xiongnu were distributed to the fifteen kingdoms that participated in the battle. The following spring Gan Yanshou and Chen Tang arrived at Chang'an and presented Emperor Yuan of Han with Zhizhi's severed head. It was displayed on the city wall for ten days and then buried. Zhizhi was the only Xiongnu Chanyu killed by the Chinese.

== Quotes ==
He is famous for the quotes:

"夫胡兵五而当汉兵一". A single soldier of Han is equivalent to five Northern barbarian soldiers.

"宜县头槁街蛮夷邸间，以示万里。明犯强汉者，虽远必诛". We have decapitated the king of the barbarians in the battle. His head should be hung up high in between the buildings where the barbarians live in order to display Han Empire’s power, to show them that no matter how far away, whoever dares to violate the mighty Han will be put to death.
