= Four Beauties =

Famous beautiful women in Chinese history

Four Great Beauties
- Chinese: 四大美女
Transcriptions
Standard Mandarin
- Hanyu Pinyin: sì dà měi nǚ
Yue: Cantonese
- Jyutping: sei3 daai6 mei5 neoi5
Southern Min
- Hokkien POJ: sì tāi bí-lú

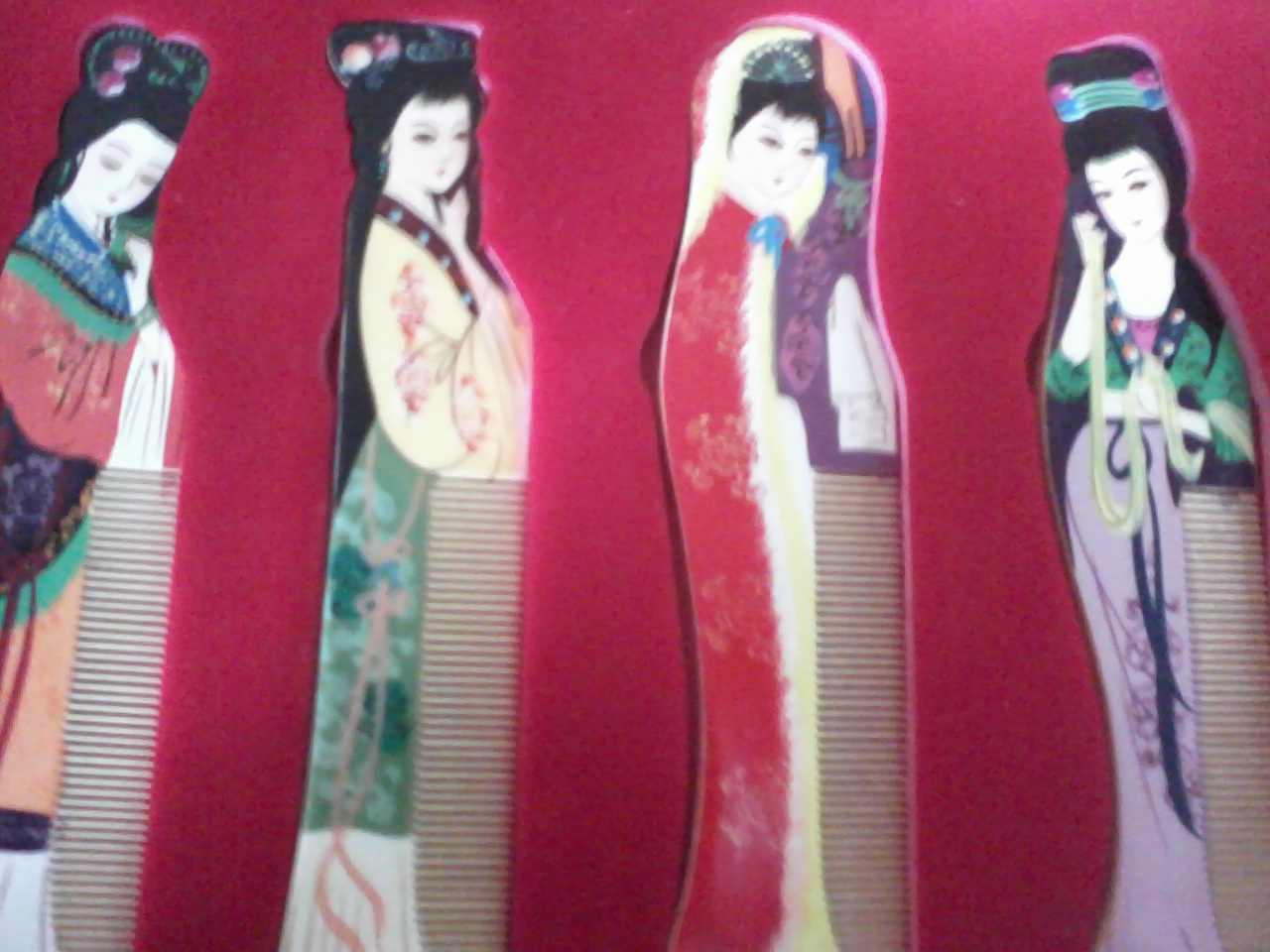
Changzhou combs

The Four Beauties or Four Great Beauties are four Chinese women who are renowned for their beauty and their impact on Chinese history through the influence they exercised over powerful men. The four are usually identified as Xi Shi, Wang Zhaojun, Diaochan, and Yang Guifei. Among them, Diaochan is a fictional character while the rest have been greatly embellished by legend.

== Background ==
One of the earliest references to qualities later associated with the canonical Four Great Beauties appears in the Zhuangzi. In one chapter, the women Mao Qiang and Lady Li are described as "great beauties" who "when fish see them they dart into the depths, when birds see them they soar into the skies, when deer see them they bolt away without looking back". This passage is the source of the well-known Chinese idiom "to make fish sink and birds fall", which refers to feminine beauty (see 沉魚落雁).

== Biographies ==
=== Xi Shi ===
Xi Shi lived around the 7th to the 6th centuries BCE, during the Spring and Autumn period. Similar to the story in the Zhuangzi, she was said to be so entrancingly beautiful that fishes would forget how to swim and sink below the surface upon seeing her reflection in the water.

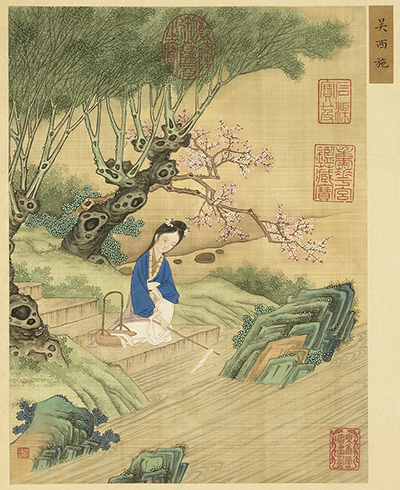
Xi Shi

Xi Shi was from Zhuji, the capital of the Ancient Yue Kingdom. Goujian, the King of Yue, had surrendered to the rival state of Wu, with the aim of biding his time before enacting his revenge. Part of his plan was to dispatch Xi Shi as a gift to Fuchai, the King of Wu, in the hope that Fuchai would become infatuated with her and become distracted from his official duties. The plan was successful, with Fuchai spending all his time entertaining Xi Shi and not attending to military matters. In part due to his distraction, Goujian was able to defeat an unprepared Fuchai in battle. Fuchai, full of regret, committed suicide.

There are two accounts of what then happened to Xi Shi. The first is that Goujian killed her by drowning her because he was afraid that he too would be mesmerized by her beauty. The second was that she eventually came together with her lover Fan Li and they lived in seclusion together.

=== Wang Zhaojun ===
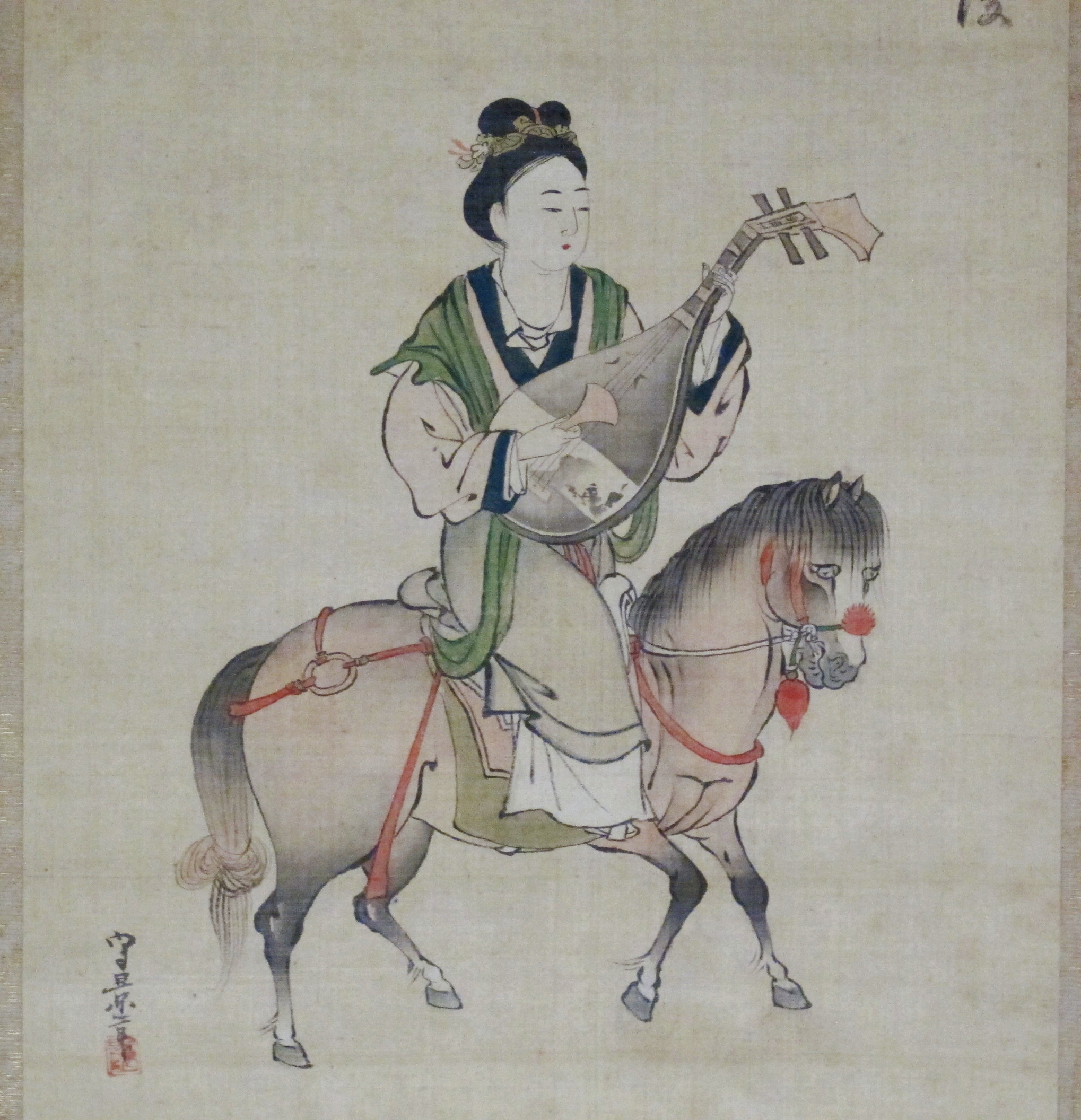
Wang Zhaojun

Wang Zhaojun was born around 50 BCE, during the Western Han dynasty. Again reflecting the Zhuangzi, she was said to be so beautiful that her appearance would entice birds in flight to fall from the sky. Locally renowned for her beauty and skill at playing the pipa, she was chosen to be admitted into the harem of Emperor Yuan, despite her young age. Despite her beauty, the emperor never visited her, as she had refused to bribe the official portraitists, who had then painted an unflattering portrait of her.

In 33 BCE, the Xiongnu Chanyu Huhanye came to the Han capital Chang'an on an official visit, and asked for a Han beauty as his wife as part of the marriage alliance system between the Han dynasty and the Xiongnu. The new emperor, Emperor Huan, ordered that the plainest woman from the harem be given to Huhanye, and so Wang Zhaojun was chosen, based on her unflattering portrait. The artist Mao Yanshou was subsequently executed for deceiving the Emperor.

=== Diaochan ===
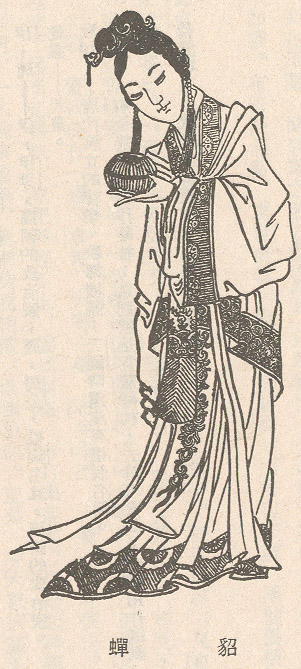
Diao Chan

Diaochan is a fictional character in the Ming novel Romance of the Three Kingdoms. Set in the waning years of the Eastern Han and the subsequent Three Kingdoms period, she was said to be so luminously lovely that the moon itself would shy away in embarrassment when compared to her face.

Chinese historical records indicate that the warrior Lü Bu had a secret affair with one of the warlord Dong Zhuo's maids and he constantly feared that Dong Zhuo would find out. This was one of the reasons why he betrayed and assassinated Dong Zhuo in 192. The maid's name was not recorded in history, but it is believed the story partly inspired the character of Diaochan. In Romance of the Three Kingdoms, Diaochan, a geji of Wang Yun, assists her master in his plot to bring down Dong Zhuo. She seduces both Lü Bu and Dong Zhuo and thus drives a wedge between the two, eventually having Lü kill his foster father Dong Zhuo. She then becomes a concubine of Lü. The fictional details about her life were added over the centuries.

=== Yang Guifei ===
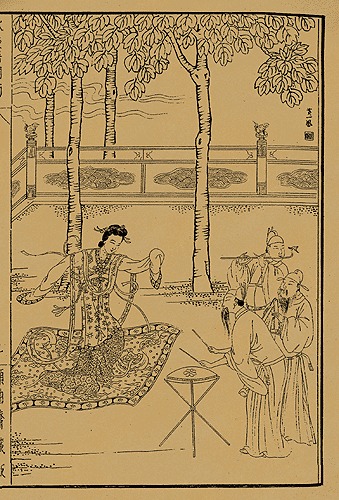
Yang Guifei

Yang Guifei lived in the 8th century and was the beloved consort of Emperor Xuanzong of Tang. She was said to have had a face that put all flowers to shame. Emperor Xuanzong doted on her so much that she was able to persuade him to make her cousin, Yang Guozhong, leading chancellor.

During the An Lushan Rebellion, as Emperor Xuanzong and his cortege were fleeing from the capital Chang'an to Chengdu, the emperor's guards demanded that he put Yang Guifei to death because they blamed the rebellion on her cousin Yang Guozhong and the rest of her family. The emperor capitulated and reluctantly ordered his attendant Gao Lishi to strangle Yang to death. Yang Guifei became a tragic figure in later depictions. Particularly influential was the Tang poet Bai Juyi's long poem, "Chang hen ge" ("Song of Everlasting Sorrow").

== Idioms ==
Well-known idioms describe the Four Beauties. The exact origin of these idioms is debated.

Chinese	English
西施沉魚	Xi Shi sinks fish
貂蟬閉月	Diaochan eclipses the moon
昭君落雁	Wang Zhaojun entices birds into falling
貴妃羞花	Yang Guifei shames flowers

These separate idioms are sometimes merged to describe especially beautiful women or simply to refer to the Four Beauties' legendary good looks. The merged idiom is 沉魚落雁，閉月羞花 (sinks fish and entices birds to fall, eclipses the moon and shames flowers). The two parts are often used separately as chengyu.

- During the Spring and Autumn period, as Xi Shi washed silk by the banks of the Puyang River in the state of Yue, the fish in the water caught sight of her beauty. So entranced were they that they forgot how to swim and sank to the riverbed.
- During the Western Han dynasty, as Wang Zhaojun journeyed through the vast desert on her way to the frontier, she sat atop her horse, lost in melancholy and weighed down by the sorrow of leaving her homeland. To ease her sorrow, she played a haunting tune. Overhead, wild geese flying across the sky were so captivated by the mournful melody—and the beauty of the musician—that they forgot to flap their wings and fell from the heavens.
- In the waning years of the Eastern Han dynasty, Diao Chan was seen in the garden offering prayers to the moon. Just then, a cloud drifted across the sky, veiling the moonlight. Witnessing this, Wang Yun later remarked to others that Diao Chan's beauty surpassed even that of the moon—so much so that the moon, ashamed by the comparison, had no choice but to retreat behind the clouds.
- During the Tianbao era of the Tang dynasty, Yang Guifei was strolling through the imperial garden, admiring the blossoms. As she gently reached out to touch a flower, its petals curled inward and its leaves drooped, as if shy in her presence. A palace maid witnessed the scene, and from then on, people would say that Yang Guifei's beauty outshone the flowers themselves—so much so that even the blooms bowed their heads in shame.

== Other claims and controversies ==
Because Diao Chan was likely a fictional name given to a maid of Dong Zhuo in later literary works rather than her actual historical name, many versions of the "Four Beauties" omit her entirely.

One variation replaces her with Zhao Feiyan, listing the Four Great Beauties as: Xi Shi, Wang Zhaojun, Zhao Feiyan, and Yang Guifei.

Another interpretation uses the phrase: "the smiling Bao Si, the ailing Xi Shi, the ruthless Daji, and the drunken Yang Guifei." This version—Bao Si, Xi Shi, Daji, and Yang Guifei—emphasizes that all four women were seen as having brought about the downfall of empires. A different version cites Yang Guifei, Consort Zheng, Consort Dong'e, and Chen Yuanyuan—four women whose beauty was said to have disrupted the affairs of state.

In 1909, a Southern Song woodblock print titled "Beauties of the Sui Dynasty Presenting Their Peerless Charms" was discovered in Pingyang, Gansu. Also known as "Portrait of the Four Beauties," it depicts, from right to left: Lüzhu, Wang Zhaojun, Zhao Feiyan, and Ban Jieyu—four renowned women of ancient China.

In the Ming dynasty, poet Zhang Yuankai wrote a series titled "Verses on the Four Beauties" in his collection The Timber-Hewing Studio, praising four classical figures: “Mingfei” (Wang Zhaojun), Zhao Feiyan, Zhuo Wenjun, and Lüzhu.

In Dream of the Red Chamber, Chapter 64, titled “The Gentlewoman Mourns with Her Five Beauties Lament; The Libertine Leaves Behind His Nine-Dragon Pendant”, Lin Daiyu composed five quatrains for five legendary beauties: Xi Shi, Yu Ji, Mingfei (Wang Zhaojun), Lüzhu, and Hongfu. Jia Baoyu later named the set "The Lament of the Five Beauties." Of these, only Xi Shi and Wang Zhaojun are included in the commonly known Four Beauties, indicating that in Cao Xueqin's time, the standard version of the “Four Beauties” had yet to be firmly established.

== See also ==
- Bao Si
