= Luyang =

Luyang may refer to:

- Luyang, Hefei, district in Hefei, Anhui, China
- Luyang, Rucheng, town in Rucheng County, Hunan, China
- Luyang (state constituency), Malaysian state constituency
- Luyang station, subway station under construction in Tongzhou District, Beijing, China

== See also ==
- Lu Yang
