= Huduershidaogao =

Chanyu

Yu
- Huduershidaogao Chanyu
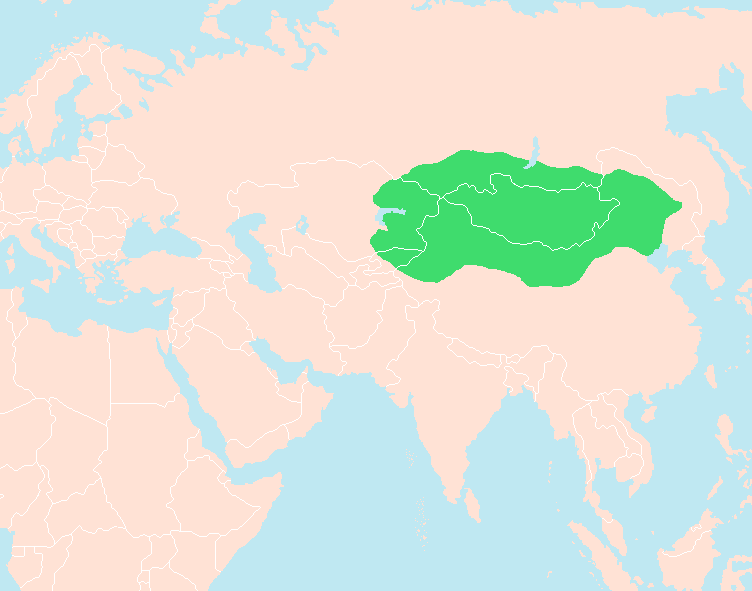
- Domain and influence of the Xiongnu
- Reign: c. 18–46 AD
- Predecessor: Wulei Chanyu
- Successor: Wudadihou
- Born: 34 BC
- Died: 46 AD (aged c. 80)
- Issue: Wudadihou
- Dynasty: Modu Chanyu
- Father: Huhanye
- Mother: Diwu Yanzhi

Huduershidaogao (Chinese: 呼都而尸道皋; 34 BC – 46 AD), born Yu, was a chanyu of the Xiongnu Empire. The brother and successor of Wuzhuliu Chanyu, he reigned from 18 to 46 AD.

== Biography ==
Yu was the eldest surviving brother of Wuzhuliu Chanyu upon his death in 13 AD, but Yu was passed over in succession in favor of his half-brother, the Wulei Chanyu. When Wulei died in 18 AD, Yu succeeded him as Huduershidaogao Chanyu.

In 19 AD, Wang Mang set up Xubu Chanyu as a rival to Huduershidaogao and stationed a large army on the frontier. Xubu died soon after and the army never set out.

Huduershidaogao killed his half-brother Yituzhiyashi who was next in line to the throne and pro-Chinese.

In 24 AD, the Gengshi Emperor sent an embassy to the Xiongnu, but Huduershidaogao felt that they did not pay him proper respect.

In 28 AD, Huduershidaogao attacked Emperor Guangwu of Han but was defeated.

In 35 AD, the Xiongnu forced the Han to withdraw from Shuofang Commandery.

In 37 AD, the warlord Lu Fang was defeated and fled to the Xiongnu court.

In 44 AD, Xiongnu raiding parties reached as far as Tianshui, Youfufeng, and Shangdang commanderies.

In 45 AD, a Xiongnu raid attacked Zhongshan Commandery.

In 46 AD, Huduershidaogao died at the age of 80 and was succeeded by his son Wudadihou.

== Footnotes ==
Preceded by Wulei	Chanyu of the Xiongnu Empire; 19 – 46 AD	Succeeded by Wudadihou
