= Juya =

Chanyu of the Xiongnu Empire

Qiemoju
- Juya Chanyu
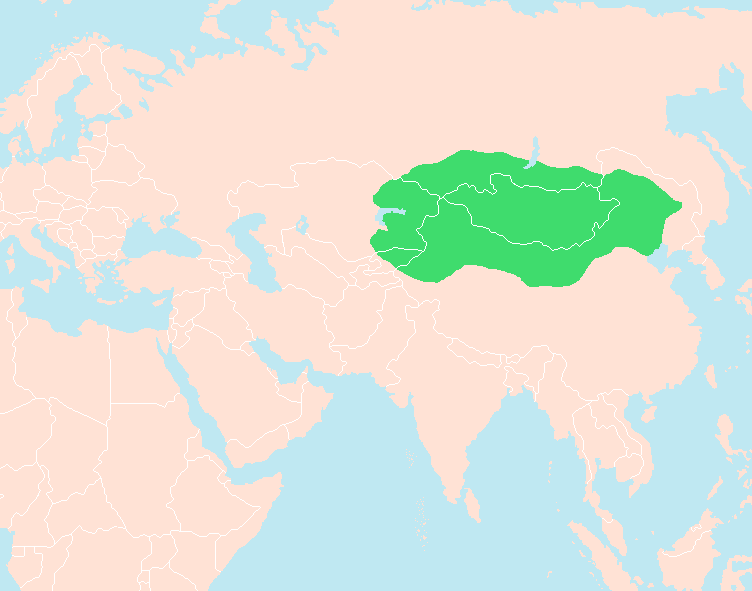
- Domain and influence of the Xiongnu
- Reign: c. 12–8 BC
- Predecessor: Souxie Chanyu
- Successor: Wuzhuliu Chanyu
- Died: 8 BC
- Dynasty: Modu Chanyu
- Father: Huhanye Chanyu
- Mother: Zhuanqu Yanzhi

Juya (Chinese: 車牙; fl. 12 BC, died 8 BC), born Qiemoju, was a chanyu of the Xiongnu Empire. The brother and successor of Souxie, he reigned from 12 to 8 BC. Juya sent his son Wuyidang to Chang'an. Juya died in 8 BC and was succeeded by his brother, Wuzhuliu.

== Footnotes ==
Preceded by Souxie	Chanyu of the Xiongnu Empire; 12–8 BC	Succeeded by Wuzhuliu
