= Wulei =

1st century Chanyu of the Xiongnu Empire

Xian
- Wulei Chanyu
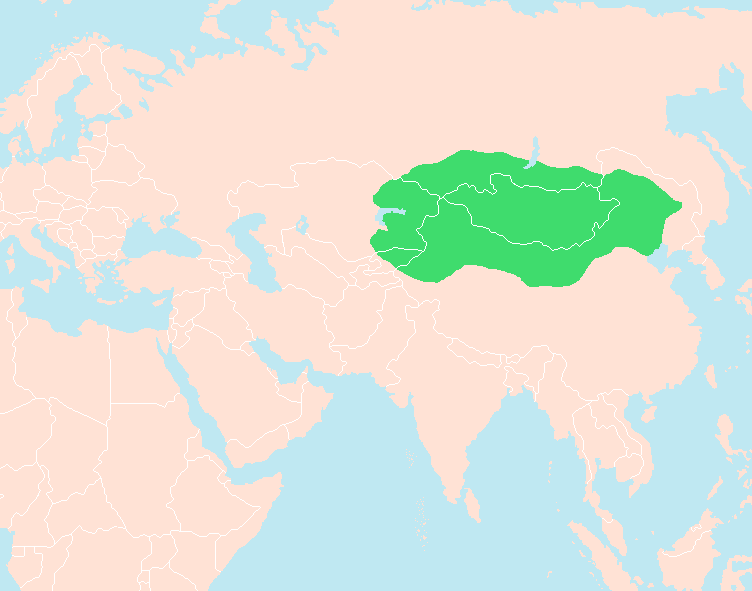
- Domain and influence of the Xiongnu
- Reign: c. 13–18 AD
- Predecessor: Wuzhuliu Chanyu
- Successor: Huduershidaogao Chanyu
- Died: 18 AD
- Dynasty: Modu Chanyu
- Father: Huhanye

Wulei (Chinese: 烏累; fl. 13 AD - died 18 AD), born Xian, was a chanyu of the Xiongnu Empire. The brother and successor of Wuzhuliu, he reigned from 13 to 18 AD. Xian took part in subjugating Wuhuan lands and as a result upset the Han dynasty. Han envoys attempted to split up the Xiongnu by creating 15 different chanyus. Xian was one of them, the Xiao Chanyu. He sent his two sons to be educated in Chang'an. When Wuzhuliu died in 13 AD, the Xiongnu Princess Xubu Juci Yun wished to maintain good relations with the Han, so she arranged for the succession to go to Xian, who became Wulei Chanyu. Wulei initially acquiesced to Han demands to return fugitives who had fled to the Xiongnu, but changed his mind when he realized his son, Deng, had died while still living in Chang'an. Xiongnu raiding on Han territory resumed once more. In 15 AD, Wang Mang sent to Wulei the body of his son together with presents, however Wulei continued to allow raiding into Han territory. Wulei died in 18 AD and was succeeded by his half-brother Huduershidaogao Chanyu.

== Footnotes ==
Preceded by Wuzhuliu	Chanyu of the Xiongnu Empire; 13 – 18 AD	Succeeded by Huduershidaogao
