= Huyandi =

Chanyu of the Xiongnu Empire

- Huyandi Chanyu
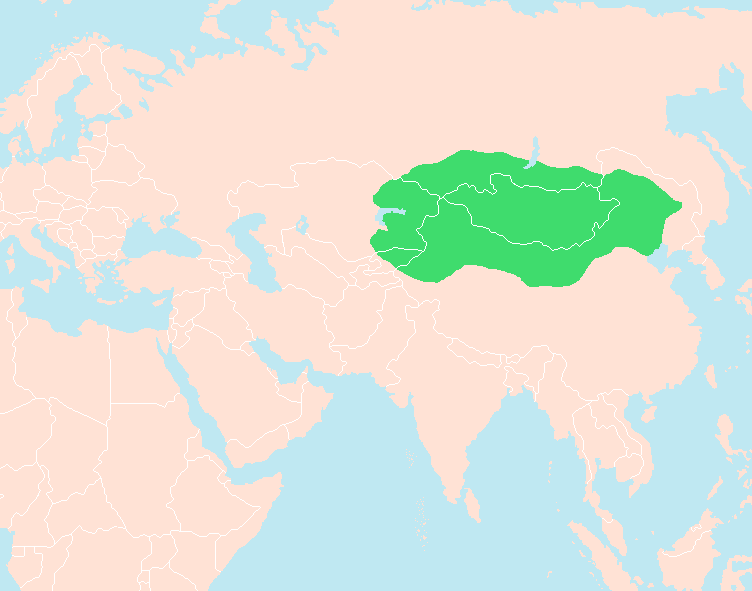
- Domain and influence of the Xiongnu
- Reign: c. 85–68 BC
- Predecessor: Hulugu Chanyu
- Successor: Xulüquanqu Chanyu
- Dynasty: Modu Chanyu
- Father: Hulugu Chanyu
- Mother: Zhuanqu Yanzhi

Huyandi (Chinese: 壺衍鞮) was the son and successor of Hulugu Chanyu. He ruled as the Chanyu of the Xiongnu Empire from 85 to 68 BC.

Huyandi was not first in the line of succession and only became chanyu, due to a plot by his mother Zhuanqu Yanzhi and the Han defector Wei Lü. He came to power in 85 BC.

In 71 BC, Chang Hui and two other generals led a force of 100,000 to aid the Wusun against the Xiongnu. The majority of the forces failed to find any Xiongnu, but Chang Hui successfully aided the Wusun in defeating a Xiongnu invasion. However, the Xiongnu came back in winter and took many captives. On the way back across the Altai Mountains, the Xiongnu suffered heavy casualties from a sudden blizzard, devastating their army. The next year the Xiongnu were attacked on all sides by Wusun, Wuhuan, and the Han. One-third of all Xiongnu died.

Huyandi died in 68 BC and was succeeded by his brother, Xulüquanqu.

== Footnotes ==
Preceded by Hulugu	Chanyu of the Xiongnu Empire; 85–68 BC	Succeeded by Xulüquanqu
