= Diaochan =

One of the Four Beauties of ancient China

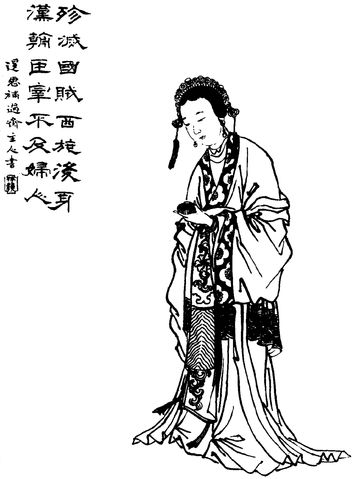
- Qing dynasty's Romance of the Three Kingdoms illustration of Diaochan
- First appearance: "Romance of the Three Kingdoms"
- Created by: Luo Guanzhong
- Based on: an unnamed maidservant of Dong Zhuo mentioned in historical records

In-universe information
- Significant others: Dong Zhuo; Lü Bu

Diaochan
- Traditional Chinese: 貂蟬
- Simplified Chinese: 貂蝉
Transcriptions
Standard Mandarin
- Hanyu Pinyin: Diāochán
- Wade–Giles: Tiao^{1}-ch'an^{2}
- IPA: [tjáʊ.ʈʂʰǎn]
Yue: Cantonese
- Yale Romanization: Diū-sìhm
- Jyutping: Diu^{1}-sim^{4}
- IPA: [tiw˥ sim˩]

Diaochan was one of the Four Beauties of ancient China. Largely a fictional character, she is best known for her role in the 14th-century historical novel Romance of the Three Kingdoms, in which she becomes a key instrument in a scheme devised by Wang Yun, seducing Lü Bu and thereby provoking the formidable warrior to betray and kill his adoptive father, the tyrannical warlord Dong Zhuo. Diaochan is often portrayed as an admirable and resourceful character; however, in some tales, she is presented as a femme fatale and executed by Guan Yu following Lü Bu’s downfall.

== Name and basis ==
The Records of the Three Kingdoms indicates that Lü Bu had a secret affair with one of Dong Zhuo's maids and he constantly feared that Dong Zhuo would find out. This was one of the reasons why he betrayed and assassinated Dong Zhuo in May 192. However, the maid's name was not recorded. The name "Diaochan" first appeared in Sanguozhi Pinghua as the courtesy name of Lü Bu's wife. A Yuan zaju (now lost) explained the name, which literally means "sable cicada", as derived from the sable tails and jade decorations in the shape of cicadas which adorned the hats of high-ranking officials in the Eastern Han dynasty.

== In folk tales ==
In earlier stories, Diaochan was described as Lü Bu's wife who had been accidentally separated from Lü Bu during the political disorder and was unaware of the conspiracy against Dong Zhuo. Later stories removed this background and had her more actively participating in the scheme. Narrations about Diaochan's ultimate fate appeared in Yuan dynasty zaju. The titles of these lost works suggest Diaochan, viewed as a femme fatale, was decapitated by Guan Yu after Lü Bu's death, which was inherited by some of later Ming or Qing operas featuring Diaochan.

In the Yuan dynasty play Lianhuan Ji (連環計), Diaochan is said to be the daughter of Ren Ang (任昂), and her real name is Ren Hongchang (任紅昌). She is in charge of taking care of the Sable Cicada Hat (貂蟬冠), so she becomes known as "Diaochan" (literally "sable cicada"). She is introduced to Guan Yu by Zhang Fei after Lü Bu's death. Instead of accepting her as the spoils of war, Guan Yu decapitates her with his sword. This event is not mentioned in historical records or the historical novel Romance of the Three Kingdoms, but is propagated through mass media such as operas and storytelling.

Diaochan's eventual fate differs in various accounts, but mainly along the following types:

- First, she is killed by Dong Zhuo's followers, along with Wang Yun, after Lü Bu escapes;
- Second, she follows Lü Bu while he roams around with his forces, but is executed along with Lü Bu after the latter's defeat at the Battle of Xiapi or killed herself after Cao Cao took possession of her;
- Third, Diaochan is captured by Cao Cao after the Battle of Xiapi but saved by Zhao Yun, whom she later marries;
- Fourth, as told in some traditional operas, Cao Cao presents Diaochan after the Battle of Xiapi to Guan Yu in the hope of winning Guan Yu's loyalty. Guan Yu, however, sees her as a femme fatale in light of her role in the undoing of Lü Bu and Dong Zhuo. He kills her to avoid her influence on him or his sworn brothers Liu Bei and Zhang Fei;
- Fifth, Guan Yu, impressed by Diaochan's sacrifice in bringing down Lü Bu and Dong Zhuo, saves her from Cao Cao at the Battle of Xiapi and sends her away. Diaochan becomes a nun and writes down her stories for posterity.

== In the Romance of the Three Kingdoms ==
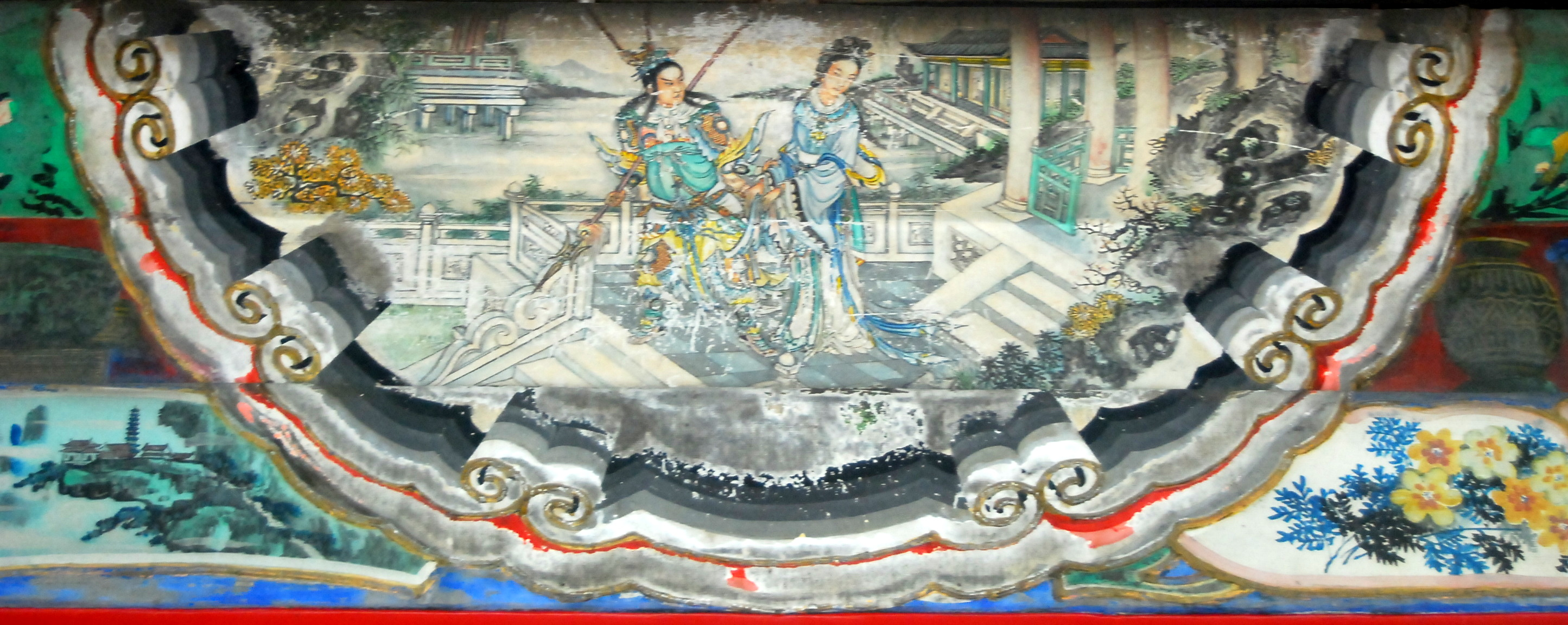
Depiction of Diaochan in the artwork at the Long Corridor, Summer Palace.

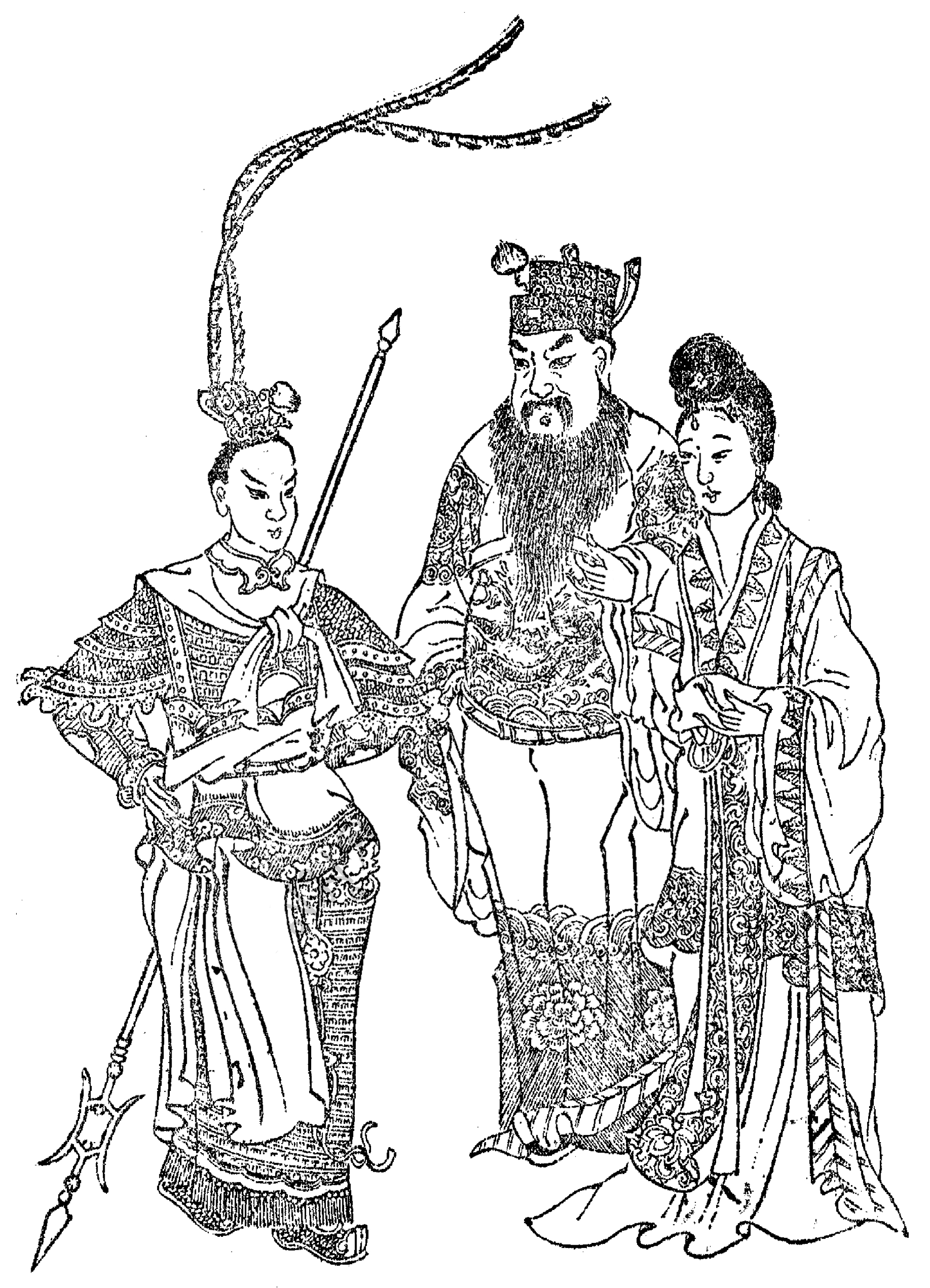
A picture of Qing dynasty era, depicting the characters in Romance of the Three Kingdoms (from left to right): Lǚ Bù, Dǒng Zhuó, and Diāochán.

In the 14th-century historical novel Romance of the Three Kingdoms, Diaochan assists the official Wang Yun in a plot to persuade Lü Bu to kill his foster father, the tyrannical warlord Dong Zhuo. Wang Yun presents her to Dong Zhuo as a concubine, but also betrothes her to Lü Bu at the same time. Diaochan uses her beauty to turn Dong Zhuo and Lü Bu against each other by inciting jealousy between them.

While Dong Zhuo is out one day, Lü Bu sneaks into his bedroom in the hope of seeing Diaochan. Diaochan pretends to be very upset and attempts suicide by throwing herself into the pond, saying that she is ashamed to see Lü Bu because she had been violated by Dong Zhuo. Lü Bu is heartbroken and promises that he will not let her suffer further at the hands of Dong Zhuo. Just then, Dong Zhuo returns and sees them embracing each other. As Lü Bu flees, Dong Zhuo chases him and hurls a spear at him, but misses. On the way, Dong Zhuo meets his adviser, Li Ru, who suggests to him to let Lü Bu have Diaochan, so as to win Lü Bu's trust. Dong Zhuo goes back to Diaochan later and accuses her of betraying his love, saying that he intends to present her to Lü Bu. Diaochan replies indignantly that Lü Bu embraced her against her will and attempts suicide to "prove her love" for Dong Zhuo. Dong Zhuo is moved and dismisses the idea of relinquishing her.

Lü Bu is outraged and goes to Wang Yun's house to vent his frustration. Wang Yun then uses the opportunity to instigate Lü Bu to join the plot to kill Dong Zhuo. Lü Bu kills Dong Zhuo when the latter shows up at a ceremony for Emperor Xian to abdicate the throne to him; the ceremony is actually a trap set by Wang Yun and Lü Bu. After Dong Zhuo's death, Lü Bu marries Diaochan and flees Chang'an with her when he is defeated by Dong Zhuo's former followers.

Later in the novel, Diaochan has only a cameo in the Battle of Xiapi, and is not mentioned again thereafter.

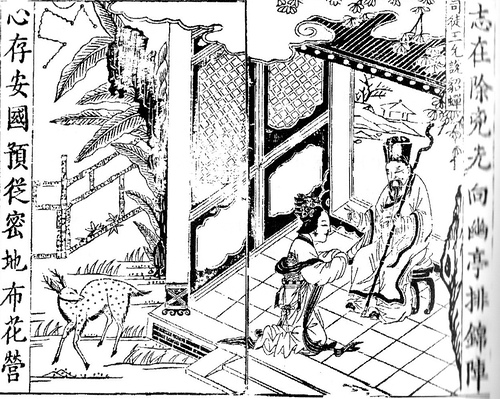
A Qing dynasty illustration showing Diaochan and Wang Yun discussing their plan to make Lü Bu kill Dong Zhuo.

== In modern popular culture ==
Diaochan appears a playable character in Koei's Dynasty Warriors and Warriors Orochi video game series. In the video game Wo Long: Fallen Dynasty, Diao Chan is the fake identity of sorceress Hong Jing. She also appears in the manga series Sōten Kōro. In the card game Magic: The Gathering, there is a Legendary Creature card called "Diaochan, Artful Beauty". Similarly, Diaochan appears as an alternate skin for the rogue class in the card game Hearthstone, titled Diao Chan Valeera. She also appears as a character in Total War: Three Kingdoms.

Notable actresses who have portrayed Diaochan in films and television series include: Violet Koo in Diao Chan (1938); Lin Dai in Diao Chan (1958); Nina Li in The Beauty Diu Sim (1987); Chen Hong in Romance of the Three Kingdoms (1994) and Diao Chan and Lü Bu (2001); Irene Chiu in Guan Gong (1996); Sharla Cheung in Diao Chan (2002); Chen Hao in Three Kingdoms (2010); Liu Yifei in The Assassins (2012); Gulnazar in God of War, Zhao Yun (2016) and Dynasty Warriors (2019); Naomi Watanabe and Suzu Hirose in The Untold Tale of the Three Kingdoms (2020).

== See also ==
- Lists of people of the Three Kingdoms
- List of fictional people of the Three Kingdoms

== Sources ==
- Chen, Shou (3rd century). Records of the Three Kingdoms (Sanguozhi).
- Fan, Ye (5th century). Book of the Later Han (Houhanshu).
- Harris, Rachel (2004). Singing the village: music, memory, and ritual among the Sibe of Xinjiang. Oxford, New York: British Academy by Oxford University Press. ISBN 978-0-19-726297-9. OCLC 56539097.
- Hua, Gu (1996). Virgin Widows. Translated by Goldblatt, Howard. Honolulu: University of Hawaii Press. pp. 104, 105. ISBN 978-0-8248-1770-1. OCLC 33407434.
- Luo, Guanzhong (14th century). Romance of the Three Kingdoms (Sanguo Yanyi).
- Off, Greg (2005). Dynasty Warriors 5: Prima Official Game Guide. Roseville, Ontario: Prima Games. ISBN 978-0-7615-5141-6. OCLC 62162042.
