= Souxie =

Chanyu of the Xiongnu Empire from 20 to 12 BC

Jumixu
- Souxie Chanyu
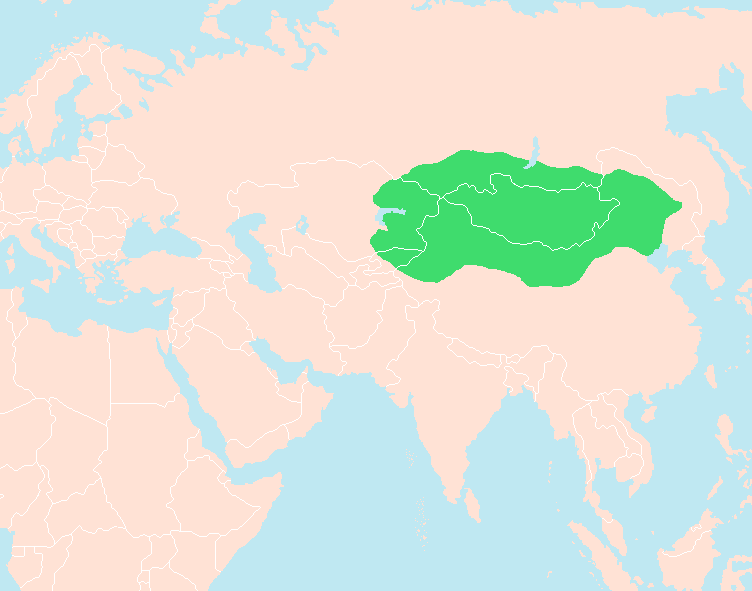
- Domain and influence of the Xiongnu
- Reign: c. 20–12 BC
- Predecessor: Fuzhulei Ruoti Chanyu
- Successor: Juya Chanyu
- Died: 12 BC
- Dynasty: Modu Chanyu
- Father: Huhanye Chanyu
- Mother: Da Yanzhi

Souxie (Chinese: 搜諧; fl. 20 BC, died 12 BC), born Jumixu, was a chanyu of the Xiongnu Empire. The brother and successor of Fuzhulei Ruoti, he reigned from 20 to 12 BC. Souxie died on his way to Chang'an in 12 BC and was succeeded by his brother Juya Chanyu.

== Footnotes ==
| Preceded by Fuzhulei Ruoti | Chanyu of the Xiongnu Empire; 20–12 BC | Succeeded by Juya Chanyu |
