= Tuqi King =

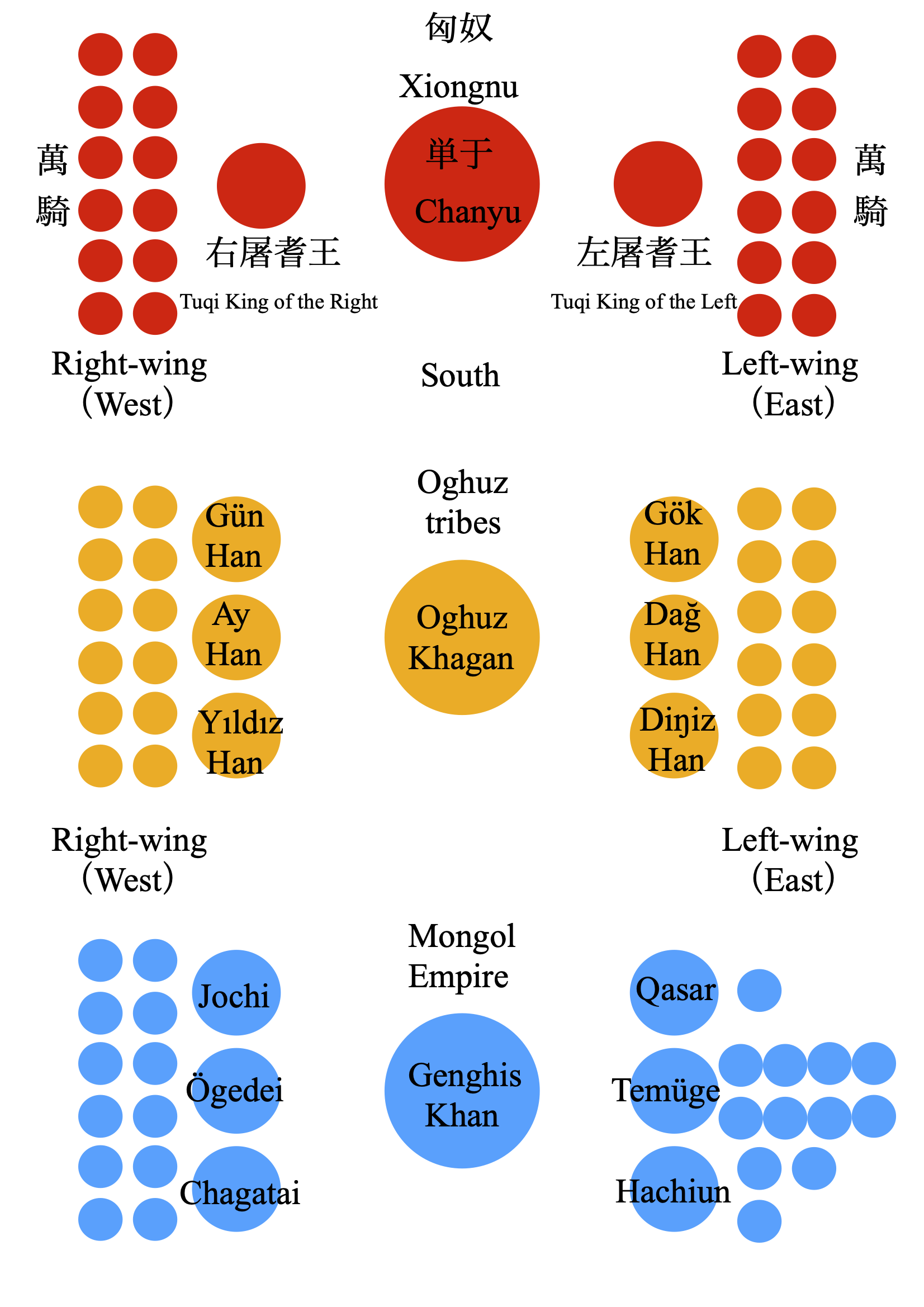
Basic forms of nomadic state from Xiongnu to Mongol

The Tuqi King (Chinese: 屠耆王; pinyin: Túqí wáng; Wade–Giles: T'u-ch'i wang) was a high office of the Xiongnu, a title also known to the Chinese as "worthy/wise prince/king". In the 6th to 8th centuries, Chinese annalists used the expression 贤王 (Xian wang) only in reference to the Eastern Turkic Khaganate.

The Tuqi King of the Left was generally designated as the successor of the chanyu. Two titles were awarded with each of them a commander-in-chief who derived his power from the eastern and western territories respectively. These served as two wings alongside the chanyu's main domain. The Chinese annalistic explanation was a "Worthy Prince of the Left (East)" and "Worthy Prince of the Right (West)". This organization of the state was traditional for the Eurasian nomadic states from the Huns to the Turkic Khanates.

== Etymology ==
Scholars, using the pronunciation of the Qing dynasty, phoneticized 屠耆 as chjuki (Russian: Чжуки), which is a direct rendering of the Turkic (j)ükü "wise", making it a literal translation of the Chinese annalistic expression "wise prince". However, Anna Dybo restored the Western Han period's Old Chinese pronunciation of 屠耆 as dā-grjəj, which traditional philologists interpret with some reservations as transcribing Turkic tegin "prince". Philologists also noted a close phonetical resemblance with another ancient Turkic title, togrul, which is homophonic with the Turkic word togrul "falcon". Other philologists interpret the dā-grjəj as representing Old Turkic toğ(u)ru, toğrï (< toğur-), Turkish, Azeri, Turkmen, Gagauz doğru, Tuvinian doora, etc., all meaning "overt, honest, just". This interpretation had initially been suggested by Friedrich von Schlegel (1772–1829) as direct semantical and phonetical correspondence.

== Social function ==
The Left Wise Prince belonged to the chanyu's clan, and in accordance with the lateral succession order, was an heir apparent to the reigning chanyu; on the death of the reigning chanyu, he was raised to the throne, and every member in the hierarchy of the Left Wing advanced one step up. Unlike the Left Wing, the members of the Right Wing belonged to the Khatun clan Huyan or later Xubu, were traditionally not eligible for the throne, and could be raised to the throne only as a result of a court coup. Accordingly, the Left Wise Prince commanded a larger contingent of the army, and during military actions in the absence of the Chanyu held a post of a Supreme Commander. Unlike the Right Wing Wise Prince, who held a position akin to a supreme judge and prime minister, and was involved in the daily rule of the country, the Left Wise Prince was detached from the daily operations, and his main function was to control the army. Being a Luanti by birth, with a Suibi Khatun mother, the Left Wise Prince was always a prime target for his younger siblings with the same pedigree. Both Left and Right Wise Princes were fairly autonomous in their actions, had a right to appoint their subordinates, were free to conduct their own local wars and retaliatory raids, and were in charge of the various tribes assigned to their respective wings. The two dynastic clans formed a permanent dynastic union of the state, ensuring its stability, and being an object of political games by their southern neighbour. The reason for the establishment of the Tuqi King by the ruler of the Xiongnu is currently unknown. It might been to keep a watchful eye on the Donghu tribe in case they tried to reclaim their land or rebel after having submitting to the chanyu and becoming a vassal for over eight decades. Until Huo Qubing defeated the Nomadic Worthy Prince of the East, Xianbei, the successor of the Donghu people was able to reclaimed back their own land and break apart from Xiongnu to establish their own confederacy to declared independence.
