= Fuzhulei Ruodi =

Chanyu of Xiongnu Empire from 31 to 20 BC

Diaotaomogao
- Fuzhulei Ruodi Chanyu
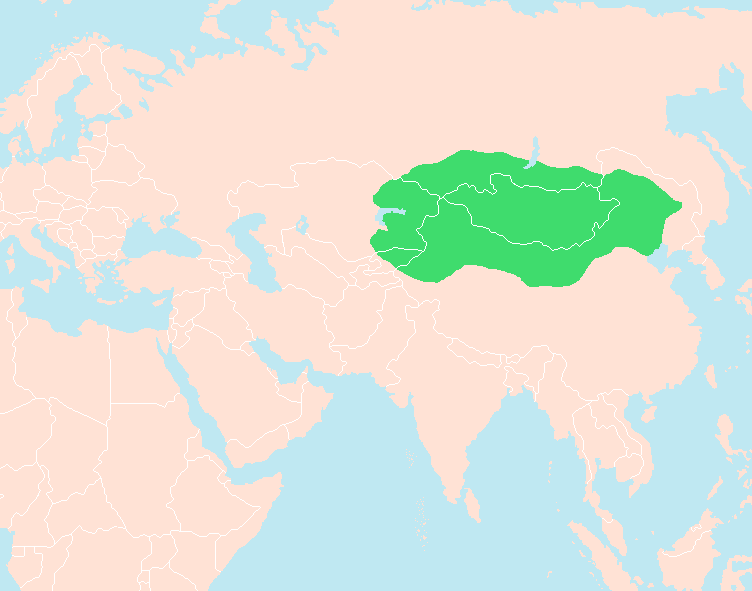
- Domain and influence of the Xiongnu
- Reign: c. 31–20 BC
- Predecessor: Huhanye Chanyu
- Successor: Souxie Chanyu
- Died: 20 BC
- Spouse: Ninghu Yanzhi
- Issue: Subu Juci (须卜居次); Dangyu Juci (当于居次)
- Dynasty: Modu Chanyu
- Father: Huhanye Chanyu
- Mother: Da Yanzhi

Fuzhulei Ruodi (Chinese: 復株絫若鞮; fl. 31 BC, died 20 BC), born Diaotaomogao, was a chanyu of the Xiongnu Empire, the son and successor of Huhanye. He ruled the Xiongnu Empire from 31 to 20 BC. Fuzhulei kept the peace with the Han dynasty and visited Chang'an in 25 BC. He died in 20 BC and was succeeded by his brother Jumixu, the Souxie Chanyu.

== Footnotes ==
Preceded by Huhanye	Chanyu of the Xiongnu Empire; 31–20 BC	Succeeded by Souxie
