= Battle of Zhizhi =

Hunnu-China war

- Part of the Han–Xiongnu War
Date	October–December, 36 BC
Location	Taraz, Kazakhstan
Result	Han victory

Belligerents
Xiongnu; Kangju allies	Han dynasty Wusun; Tarim Basin city-states

Commanders and leaders
Zhizhi Chanyu †	Chen Tang; Gan Yanshou

Strength
3,000 Xiongnu cavalry and infantry with 10,000 cavalry reinforcement from Kangju	40,000

Casualties and losses
Heavy losses, with 1,518 killed, over 1,000 surrendered and 145 captured	Minimal or not reported

The Battle of Zhizhi (郅支之戰) was fought in 36 BC between the Han dynasty and the Xiongnu chieftain Zhizhi Chanyu. Zhizhi was defeated and killed. The battle was probably fought near Talas on the Talas River on the Kazakhstan–Kyrgyzstan border, which makes it one of the westernmost points reached by a Chinese army. The Battle of Talas in 751 AD was fought in the same area.

== Background ==
In 56 BC Zhizhi revolted against his brother. As his brother grew more powerful, Zhizhi retreated westward. Around 44 BC he made a close alliance with the Kangju near Lake Balkhash. Later he quarrelled with the Kangju, killed several hundred of them and forced them to build him a fortress. The fort required 500 men and two years to build. It was probably located near Taraz.

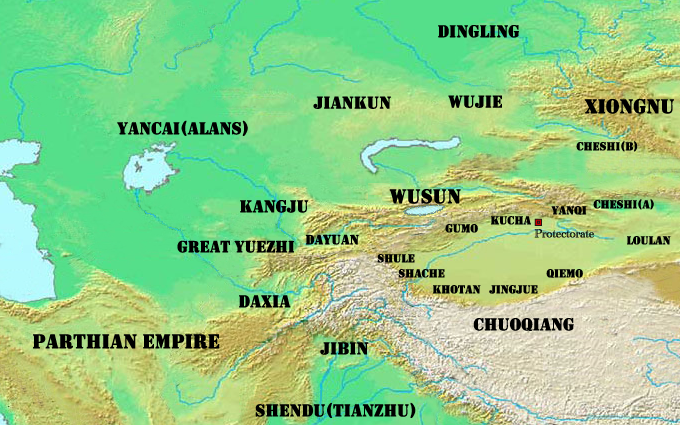
Approximate location of Kangju

== Battle ==
=== Assembly and march of Han forces ===
Around 36 BC, the governor of the Western Regions was Gan Yanshou. His deputy commander, Chen Tang, claimed that Zhizhi was planning to build up a great empire and proposed a pre-emptive attack. Gan Yanshou objected; but he soon fell ill, and while he was incapacitated Chen Tang forged an edict in Yanshou's name and mobilized the army. Gan Yanshou was forced to yield. All this was done without the Emperor's permission. An army of 40,000 Han and Hu troops (''Hu" is a loose term for non-Chinese) assembled. It marched west on both sides of the Tarim Basin, reunited near Kashgar, and moved across Kangju territory reaching the western shore of Lake Balkhash. At this point a party of several thousand Kangju cavalrymen, returning from a raid on Wusun, stumbled onto the rear of the Chinese army, attacked it, and made off with a large quantity of food and weapons. Chen Tang sent his Hu troops back and defeated the Kangju, killing 460 of them and freeing 470 Wusun captives.

=== Battle at Zhizhi's Fortress ===
Several Kangju nobles defected to the Chinese and provided information and guides. The Chinese encamped about 30 li from Zhizhi's fortress and the two sides exchanged rather hypocritical messages. The Chinese then moved to within three li of Zhizhi and fortified themselves. The Xiongnu sent out several hundred cavalry and infantry, but were driven back into the fort. The Chinese followed and attacked the fort and burned part of the wall. That night several hundred Xiongnu horsemen tried to escape but all were killed. Zhizhi himself thought of escape but decided to remain because he knew that he had too many enemies in the surrounding country, and fighting continued. Zhizhi's queen and concubines shot arrows from the ramparts. Zhizhi was wounded in the nose by an arrow.

Shortly after midnight the outer walls were breached and the Xiongnu retreated to the inner citadel. At this point several thousand Kangju horsemen appeared and attacked the Chinese in the darkness but were unable to accomplish anything. When dawn broke parts of the inner citadel were on fire. The Chinese piled dirt on the citadel walls and clambered into the citadel. Zhizhi and a hundred or so warriors retreated into the palace. The palace was set on fire and attacked from all directions and Zhizhi was mortally wounded.

== Aftermath ==
1,518 Xiongnu died, including Zhizhi and Zhizhi's wives. 145 were captured and well over 1,000 surrendered. The soldiers were allowed to keep their booty and the surrendered Xiongnu were distributed to the fifteen kingdoms that participated in the battle. The following spring Gan Yanshou and Chen Tang arrived at Chang'an and presented Emperor Yuan of Han with Zhizhi's severed head. It was displayed on the city wall for ten days and then buried. Zhizhi was the only Xiongnu chanyu killed by the Chinese.

== Hypothetical Sino-Roman contact ==
In 1941 Sinologist Homer H. Dubs proposed that Roman legionaries clashed with Han troops during the battle and were resettled afterwards in a Chinese village named Liqian. This theory was supported by Lev Gumilev. However, this has been rejected by modern historians and geneticists on the grounds of a critical appraisal of the ancient sources and recent DNA testings of the village people.

In 2011 Dr Christopher Anthony Matthew from the Australian Catholic University suggested that these strange warriors were not Roman legionaries, but hoplites from the Kingdom of Fergana also known as Alexandria Eschate or Dayuan which was one of the successor states of Alexander the Great's Macedonian Empire.
