= Woyanqudi =

Chanyu of the Xiongnu Empire

Tuqitang
- Woyanqudi Chanyu
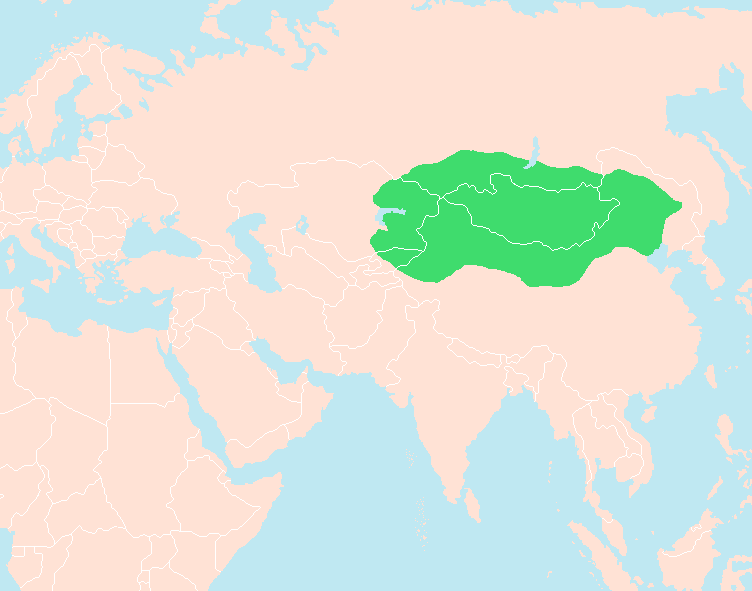
- Domain and influence of the Xiongnu
- Reign: c. 60–58 BC
- Predecessor: Xulüquanqu Chanyu
- Successor: Huhanye Chanyu
- Dynasty: Modu Chanyu

Woyanqudi (Chinese: 握衍朐鞮), born Tuqitang (Chinese: 屠耆堂), was a chanyu of the Xiongnu Empire. The successor to Xulüquanqu Chanyu, he reigned from 60 to 58 BC.

Woyanqudi was a tyrannical ruler. He killed his predecessor's supporters and dismissed his own kinsfolk. He killed himself in 58 BC and the Xiongnu split into several warring factions. By 55 BC, the two dominant factions were the sons of his predecessor; Huhanye Chanyu and Zhizhi Chanyu.

== Footnotes ==
Preceded by Xulüquanqu	Chanyu of the Xiongnu Empire; 60–58 BC	Succeeded by Huhanye
