= Xulüquanqu =

Chanyu of the Xiongnu Empire

- Xulüquanqu Chanyu
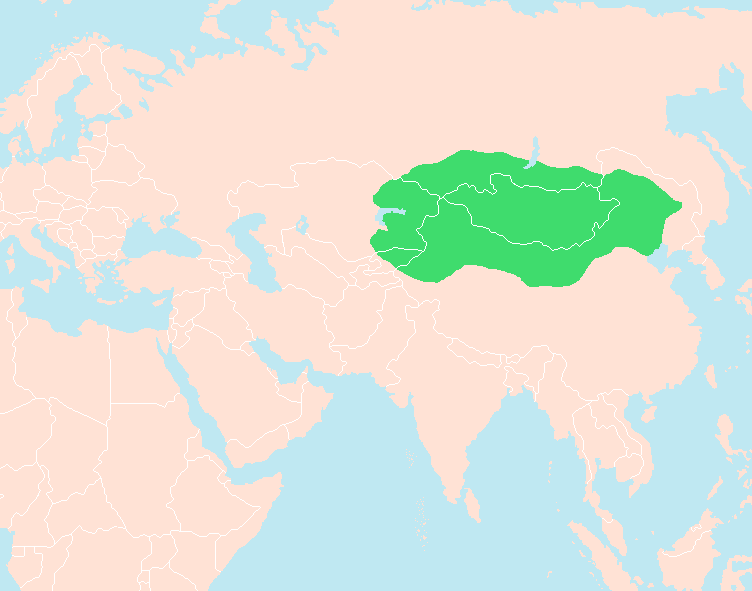
- Domain and influence of the Xiongnu
- Reign: c. 68–60 BC
- Predecessor: Huyandi Chanyu
- Successor: Woyanqudi Chanyu
- Dynasty: Modu Chanyu
- Father: Hulugu Chanyu

Xulüquanqu (Chinese: 虛閭權渠) was a chanyu of the Xiongnu Empire. He was the brother and successor of the Huyandi Chanyu, and he reigned from 68 to 60 BC.

In 64 BC, the Xiongnu raided Jiaohe.

Xulüquanqu died in 60 BC and was succeeded by Woyanqudi.

== Footnotes ==
Preceded by Huyandi	Chanyu of the Xiongnu Empire; 68–60 BC	Succeeded by Woyanqudi
