= Hulugu =

Chanyu of the Xiongnu Empire

- Hulugu Chanyu
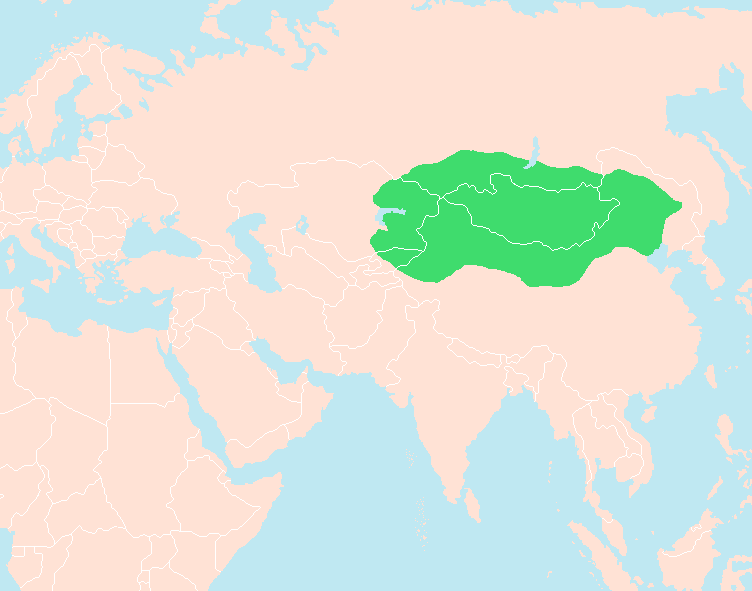
- Domain and influence of the Xiongnu
- Reign: c. 96–85 BC
- Predecessor: Qiedihou
- Successor: Huyandi
- Dynasty: Modu Chanyu
- Father: Qiedihou

Hulugu (Chinese: 狐鹿姑) was a chanyu of the Xiongnu Empire. He was the son and successor of Qiedihou and reigned from 96 to 85 BC.

Hulugu originally did not want to become chanyu but was convinced to take the title by his brother.

In early 90 BC, Li Guangli and two other generals led a force of 79,000 against the Xiongnu. Li defeated a Xiongnu detachment 5,000 strong and another one 20,000 strong, but he overextended and his supplies ran out, exhausting his men and horses. The Xiongnu outpaced them and dug ditches across their line of retreat. When they tried to cross the ditches, the Xiongnu fell on them, routing the entire army. Li Guangli surrendered. The other Han generals Shang Qiucheng and Ma Tong managed to return safely.

Li Guangli married Hulugu's daughter. About a year later, he was executed after having a conflict with Wei Lü, another Han defector who was favoured by Hulugu.

Hulugu died in 85 BC and was succeeded by his son Huyandi.

== Footnotes ==
Preceded by Qiedihou	Chanyu of the Xiongnu Empire; 96–85 BC	Succeeded by Huyandi
