= Wuzhuliu =

Chanyu of the Xiongnu Empire (8 BC - 13 AD)

Nangzhiyasi
- Wuzhuliu Chanyu
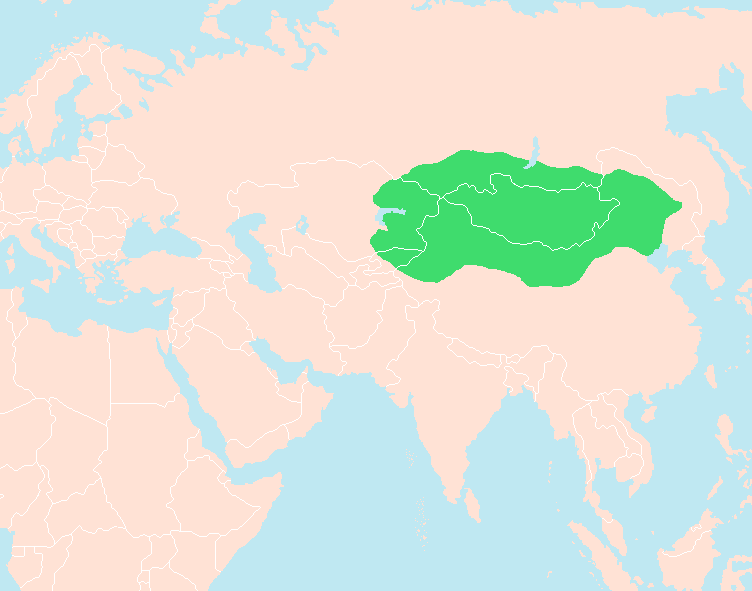
- Domain and influence of the Xiongnu
- Reign: c. 8 BC–13 AD
- Predecessor: Juya Chanyu
- Successor: Wulei Chanyu
- Died: 13 AD
- Dynasty: Modu Chanyu
- Father: Huhanye
- Mother: Zhuanqu Yanzhi

Wuzhuliu (Chinese: 烏珠留) or Wuzhuliuruodi (Chinese: 烏珠留若鞮), born Nangzhiyasi (Chinese: 囊知牙斯; fl. 8 BC, died 13 AD), was a chanyu of the Xiongnu Empire. The brother and successor of Juya Chanyu, he reigned from 8 BC to 13 AD. Wuzhuliu sent his son Wududiyasi to the Western Han imperial court upon his accession and arranged for his son Jiliukun to go to the Western Han court upon his death. Wuzhuliu died in 13 AD and was succeeded by his brother, Wulei Chanyu.

During the life of Wuzhuliu, the Han dynasty dominated the steppe politically. For a generous reward by the Han, he changed his personal name Nanchjiyasy to Chji. On ascending to the throne, he confirmed the standing agreement between the Han and the Xiongnu: "Henceforth the Han and Hun will be one House, from generation to generation they will not deceive each other, nor attack each other. If a larceny happens, they will mutually inform and execute and compensate, in the event of raids by enemies they will help each other with troops. He of them who is first to breach the agreement, he will be penalized by the Sky, and his posterity from generation to generation would suffer under I this oath".

Despite this agreement, during Wuzhuliu's reign relations with the Han dynasty went from cordial to antagonistic when a usurper, Wang Mang, came to power, which ended the Western Han dynasty, and established the short-lived Xin dynasty. Assembling a 300,000-strong army, Wang Mang began military actions, but his attempts ended in futility. Wuzhuliu died in AD 13, before the end of the war. His successor was Wulei Chanyu of the Süybu clan.

Wuzhuliu refused to return land to the Wusun but returned hostages to them.

In 3 BC, Wuzhuliu proposed a visit to the Han court. The Han were initially reluctant but eventually agreed after Yang Xiong advised Emperor Ai of Han that it would be unwise to rebuff such a gesture. Wuzhuliu visited Chang'an in 1 BC.

In 6 AD, two kings of the Jushi, Gugou and Tangdou, fled to the Xiongnu. However, Wuzhuliu turned them over to the Han due to the convention of four clauses, whereby he would not harbour fugitives from the Han dynasty, the Wusun, the Wuhuan, or the city states of the Western Regions. In return the Han sent gifts to the Chanyu. However, among the gifts was a seal which aroused suspicions from Wuzhuliu that the text it bore implied a degradation of his status. The Han envoys smashed the seal but it was too late.

The Xiongnu came into conflict with the Wuhuan and took territory from them. They were criticized for this by the Han as it contravened the terms of their convention. In response Wuzhuliu sent a large force under Puhuluzi to show his strength near Shuofang Commandery.

In 10 AD, Hulanzhi, elder brother of the king of Jushi, fled to the Xiongnu. Four Han officials also defected to the Xiongnu.

Wang Mang attempted to split the Xiongnu among 15 chanyus and named two, Xiao Chanyu and Shun Chanyu, which angered Wuzhuliu. In 11 AD, Wuzhuliu retaliated by sending an armed expedition to Yunzhong, Yanmen, and Shuofang commanderies, slaughtering a number of civilians.

In 13 AD, Wuzhuliu died and was succeeded by his brother, Wulei Chanyu, who had previously been named Xiao Chanyu by the Han.

== Footnotes ==
| Preceded by Juya | Chanyu of the Xiongnu Empire; 8 BC – 13 AD | Succeeded by Wulei |
