= Battle of Xiangguo (312) =

Battle between the Han-Zhao and Western Jin (312)

- Part of Upheaval of the Five Barbarians
| Date | December 312 AD |
| Location | Xingtai, Hebei |
| Result | Han victory |

Belligerents
| Han-Zhao | Western Jin |

Commanders and leaders
| Shi Le | Wang Jun; Duan Jilujuan |

Strength
| Unknown | 50,000 |

Casualties and losses
| Unknown | Heavy |

The Battle of Xiangguo was fought between forces of the Han-Zhao general, Shi Le and the Western Jin governor, Wang Jun in December 312. The battle concluded in a decisive victory for Shi Le and resulted in the collapse of Wang Jun's long-standing alliance with the Duan-Xianbei tribe of Liaoxi.

== Prelude ==
Following a disastrous bid to conquer the southlands, Shi Le, through the advice of Zhang Bin, brought his followers to establish a capital at the city of Xiangguo, ending his years of leading a roving army. His new base was in close proximity to two of his rival warlords from the Western Jin; the Inspector of Bing province, Liu Kun and the Inspector of You province, Wang Jun. Soon after occupying Xiangguo, Zhang Bin warned his lord to anticipate an attack from either one of the two men, and that he should begin fortifying the city and stockpiling his grains. Shi Le did so by sending out his generals to attack Ji province, where many of the local forts and ramparts submitted to him and allowed him to transport their grains to Xiangguo.

At the time, Wang Jun was one the most powerful Jin vassals remaining in northern China, partly due to his alliances with the Duan-Xianbei and Wuhuan tribes who provided him with elite cavalry units. Shi Le was unable to overcome his forces at first, losing to him on four separate occasions between 308 and 310. Wang Jun maintained strong ties with the Duan, marrying his daughter to their chieftain, Duan Wuwuchen and successfully petitioning the court to grant them a dukely fief over Liaoxi Commandery. After the fall of Luoyang and the capture of Emperor Huai of Jin, his influence was so immense that he began having ambitions to claim the imperial throne for himself.

In December 312, two natives of Guangping Commandery, Zhang Chai and You Lun (游綸), brought severals thousands people to occupy the city of Yuanxiang (苑鄕, in present-day Hebei and Beijing), where they submitted to Wang Jun. Shi Le sent seven of his generals, including Kui An and Zhi Xiong, to attack them, and they were able to break through the outer walls.

== The battle ==
To support Zhang Chai and You Lun, Wang Jun dispatched his Protector, Wang Chang (王昌) and the Duan tribe with 50,000 soldiers to attack Shi Le at Xiangguo. Leading the Duan was their chieftain, Duan Jilujuan, his younger brothers, Duan Pidi and Duan Wenyang, as well as his cousin, Duan Mobo. When Jilujuan arrived and camped at Zhuyang (渚陽; also in modern-day Xingtai), Shi Le had several of his generals attack him, but they were all defeated. Jilujuan then began building siege weapons to breach Xiangguo's walls, which unsettled Shi Le's men.

Shi Le felt that his defenses were not ready and that he did not have enough food to survive a siege. He held an emergency council with his generals, who nearly all suggested that he keep to their defenses. However, Zhang Bin and the general, Kong Chang, disagreed. Instead, they proposed:

Among the Xianbei, the Duan are the bravest, and none more so than Duan Mopei, who commands their strongest soldiers. Word is that Jilujuan will soon be attacking the northern part of the city. Their main force has come a long way and been fighting for days. They think that we are weak and isolated with no intention to fight, so they must be feeling complacent. It is best that we refrain from engaging first to feign cowardice. For now, we should carve twenty postern gates onto the northern city wall. Then, we wait for their arrival, and as they settle into their formations, we attack them when they least expect and charge towards Mopei's canopy. The enemies will be so shocked that they would have no time to formulate a plan, sealing their defeat. Once Mopei is dealt with, the rest will falter without a fight.

Shi Le followed their advice and built the postern gates. As predicted, Jilujuan prepared his army to carry out an assault on the northern part of the city, so Shi Le climbed to the top of the walls to observe their movements. He eventually found his opening when he saw that some of the Duan officers and soldiers had laid down their weapons to rest. Kong Chang rushed out of the postern gates with elite troops to attack Duan Mobo while Shi Le's men atop the walls beat their drums to boost their morale. They were able to reach Mobo's canopy, but unable to defeat, they retreated back into the city, enticing Mobo to pursue them. As Mobo entered the rampart gates, Shi Le's men had him captured.

With Mobo's capture, Jilujuan and the rest of his army retreated. Kong Chang chased after and inflicted them a great defeat, killing many of their soldiers and capturing 5,000 of their armoured horses. Jilujuan gathered his remaining troops before falling back to Zhuyang.

Shi Le used Mobo as a hostage to negotiate for peace with Jilujuan. Despite Wenyang's objection, Jilujuan was desperate to have his cousin released, even sending armoured horses, gold, silver and three of Mobo's younger brothers in exchange for him. Many of Shi Le's generals wanted Mobo killed instead, but Shi Le insisted that on winnng the goodwill of the Duan, so he returned Jilujuan's gold and silver while sending Shi Hu to swear an oath of brotherhood with him at Zhuyang. Satisfied with his conduct, Jilujuan and his army withdrew, forcing Wang Chang to also return to Wang Jun's base at Jicheng. Shi Le treated Mobo courteously with feasts and even swore an oath of father and son before returning him to Liaoxi.

== Aftermath ==
As the crisis at Xiangguo was averted, Zhang Chai and You Lun soon surrendered to Shi Le. From then on, the Duan tribe began distancing themselves from Wang Jun in favour of Shi Le. In April or May 313, Wang Jun sent his son-in-law, Zao Song (棗嵩) with his armies to camp at the Yi river (易水; in present-day Yi County, Hebei), intending to campaign against Shi Le with the Duan tribe again. However, when he realized that the Duan were deliberately ignoring his summons, he angrily allied with the rival Tuoba and Murong Xianbei tribes to attack them, but failed.

The battle at Xiangguo was a turning point for Shi Le; with Wang Jun deprived of his Xianbei cavalry, Shi Le was able defeat his forces with relative ease. The following year, Shi Le carried several deadly and successful attacks on Wang Jun's appointed provincial governors. He started capturing more commanderies and counties in the north, while many of the Wuhuan tribes also secretly defected to him from Wang Jun. These circumstances finally allowed Shi Le to launch his final campaign and finish off Wang Jun in the spring of 314.

== Sources ==
- Killigrew, John W. (2013), "The Role of the Moushi 谋士 in the Jin Shu and Wei Shu During the Northern Kingdoms Period, 309–450 AD", Journal of Asian History, vol. 47, no. 2, JSTOR, pp. 151–96, doi:10.13173/jasiahist.47.2.0151
- Book of Jin, vol.104
- Book of Wei, vol.103
- Zizhi Tongjian, vol.88
