= Duan Wenyang =

Duan Wenyang (段文鴦) (fl.310–321) was a Xianbei military general of the Duan tribe during the Jin dynasty (266–420) and Sixteen Kingdoms period. He was the younger brother of Duan Pidi who became one of his most key generals in his war against the Han-Zhao general and later King of Later Zhao, Shi Le. When their forces were finally cornered by Shi Le at Yanci (厭次, around present-day Dezhou, Shandong) in 321, Duan Wenyang mounted a last stand, with records alleging that he fought on his own for several hours against enemies surrounding him from all sides, but was eventually captured.

== Life ==
=== Early career ===
Duan Wenyang was a son of the Duan chieftain, Duan Wuwuchen and the younger brother of Duan Jilujuan and Duan Pidi. He first appeared in history in 310, serving as a general under his father when their tribe was allied with the Jin Inspector of You province, Wang Jun. That year, the Han-Zhao general, Shi Le led an attack on the city of Wancheng. Wang Jun dispatched Duan Wenyang to rescue the city, forcing Shi Le to retreat to Wenshi Crossing (文石津, around present-day Yanjin County, Henan), where he was defeated by another general of Wang, Wang Shenshi (王申始).

In 312, after Duan Jilujuan succeeded their father as chieftain, Duan Wenyang followed his brother to besiege Shi Le at Xiangguo with Wang Jun's general, Wang Chang (王昌). During the siege, their cousin, Duan Mobo was captured, and their forces suffered a rout. Jilujuan decided to negotiate peace with Shi Le for Mobo's return, but Duan Wenyang warned him, "You are letting a wounded enemy run free for the sake of a single man! Would this not incur the wrath of Wang Pengzu (Wang Jun's courtesy name) and invite future troubles?" However, Jilujuan ignored him, and during the negotiations, he ordered Wenyang to swear a brotherly oath with Shi Le's nephew and adopted brother, Shi Hu. After Mobo was returned, the Duan withdrew and broke off relations with Wang Jun.

=== Supporting Duan Pidi ===
In 314, Shi Le captured Wang Jun at his base in Ji and later executed him. He then appointed Liu Han (劉翰) to guard the city as he returned to his own capital at Xiangguo, but in his absence, Liu Han surrendered the city to Duan Pidi, who reaffirmed his loyalty to the Jin court and proclaimed himself the new Inspector of You province. He was joined by Duan Wenyang, while Jilujuan neither punished or supported his brothers' actions.

Soon after, the Administrator of Pingyuan, Shao Xu also declared his allegiance to Jin and opposition to Shi Le at Yanci. Enraged, Shi Le brought 8,000 soldiers to besiege Shao Xu. Duan Pidi sent Duan Wenyang to reinforce the city, and when Shi Le saw his forces approaching, he abandoned his siege equipment and retreated eastward. Wenyang and Shao Xu pursued him all the way to Anling (安陵; north of present-day Yanling County, Henan), where they captured his officials and relocated more than 3,000 families before returning. Wenyang also sent cavalry to harass Shi Le's northern border and invade Changshan, seizing over 2,000 households.

In 316, the Jin Inspector of Yan Province, Liu Yan was attacked by Shi Hu at Linqiu (廩丘, in modern Puyang, Henan). Duan Pidi instructed Duan Wenyang to lead reinforcements. However, Shi Hu reinforced Luguan Crossing (盧關津; south of present-day Fan County, Henan) and prevented Wenyang's forces from advancing. In the end, Liu Yan abandoned Linqiu and managed to escape to Duan Wenyang.

In 318, civil war broke out among the Duan between Pidi and Duan Mobo after the latter forcibly seized control of the chieftaincy following the death of Duan Jilujuan. Duan Wenyang sided with Pidi, but Pidi soon lost the support of the people after he killed his ally, the popular Inspector of Bing province, Liu Kun. Later that year, with the help of Shao Xu, Duan Wenyang led his brother's soldiers to scour for food in Pingyuan, but they were defeated by Shi Hu instead. Their defeat prompted the Qing province warlord, Cao Ni to plunder Shao Xu's military colonies, but Shao Xu was able to retaliate and had Duan Wenyang and his nephew, Shao Cun (邵存) garrisoned at Huangjingu (黃巾固; northwest of present-day Zhangqiu, Shandong) to pressure Cao Ni into peace.

In 319, Shi Le's forces finally drove Duan Pidi and Duan Wenyang out of Ji, forcing them to seek refuge with Shao Xu at Yanci. In 319, Duan Wenyang participated in the Prince of Langya, Sima Rui's attack on the bandit, Xu Kan at Taishan Commandery, forcing him into submission.

=== Battle of Yanci ===
In 320, Duan Wenyang joined his brother on his campaign to recapture Ji. However, while they were away, Shi Le (now King of the Later Zhao) seized the opportunity to send Shi Hu to besiege Shao Xu at Yanci. Shao Xu led a sortie out of his city but was captured in an ambush, leaving the rest of his family members to fend off the invaders. Hearing the news back home, Duan Pidi rushed back home and attempted to enter Yanci but was blocked by Shi Hu's army. Duan Wenyang led several hundred of his personal soldiers to fight their way through, allowing Pidi to barely make his way back. Pidi and Shao Xu's family held out in the city. During the defense, Duan Wenyang observed that Shi Hu had sent out his cavalry to plunder the surrounding towns and requested his brother to launch an attack. However, Pidi suspected an ambush and refused.

Later in the year, the Later Zhao general, Kong Chang captured more than ten of Duan Wenyang's camps, becoming complacent and neglecting his own defenses. When Duan Wenyang learned of this, he launched a night attack on Kong Chang's camp, greatly routing him and forcing him to retreat.

In early 321, Shi Hu resumed his attack on Yanci while Kong Chang captured several cities in Duan Pidi's territory. Duan Wenyang said to his brother, "I am renowned for my courage, and the people rely upon. How cowardly it is that we stand by and do nothing while our people suffer. If the people have all lost their hope, then who will be willing to die for us?" Wenyang then led several dozen stalwart soldiers into battle. Duan Wenyang managed to kill many of the Later Zhao soldiers, and when their cavalry retreated, he pursued them, inciting Pidi to join him with his infantry. However, they fell into Shi Hu's ambush, but Wenyang and Pidi fought fiercely and killed several dozen men. Afterward, Wenyang tried to reunite with Pidi, but his brother had already retreated, and Wenyang's horse was tired and unable to move.

According to records, Shi Hu then shouted to Wenyang, "Brother, you and I are barbarians, and my only desire is for both of us to be one family. Now, just as I had wished, we meet again, so why should we resume fighting? Please lay down your weapons." Wenyang angrily replied, "You are nothing but a bandit, destined to die soon. We have only come to this because my brother (Duan Jilujuan) refused to heed my words. I would rather die in battle than surrender to you!" Wenyang then dismounted and continued fighting. When his spear broke, he took up a sword and reportedly fought from early morning to late afternoon. Eventually, the Later Zhao soldiers managed to surround him using their horse cloaks, and Wenyang, now exhausted, was finally captured.

=== Defeat and death ===
With Duan Wenyang's capture, morale in Yanci plummeted, and Shao Xu's younger brother, Shao Ji (邵洎) arrested Duan Pidi and surrendered the city to Shi Hu. Shi Le appointed Wenyang as General of the Household Gentlemen of the Left and awarded him with the gold seal and purple ribbon. Around a year or so later, a rebellious plot against Later Zhao was discovered that sought to acclaim Duan Pidi as their leader. As a result, Pidi was executed, and Duan Wenyang was also poisoned to death.
