= Kong Chang =

Later Zhao general

- 孔萇

Personal details
- Born: Unknown
- Died: Unknown
- Occupation: General

Kong Chang (fl. 309–321) was a military general of China's Later Zhao dynasty during the Sixteen Kingdoms period. He was one of Shi Le (Emperor Ming)'s more active generals during Shi's career in the Han-Zhao dynasty as well as his early reign as Prince of Zhao. Kong participated in many battles against the northern vassals of the Eastern Jin dynasty, usually leading the vanguard with consistent success.

== Life ==
According to the Sinologist Paul Pelliot's transcript of the Jin Ji (晉紀), collected in Luo Zhenyu's Mingsha Shishi Yushu (鳴沙石室佚書), it is likely that Kong Chang was a "Hu" person. In the transcript, he is not grouped in the list of Han Chinese that served Zhao such as Xu Guang and Cheng Xia. He may also be the same person as one of Shi Le's Eighteen Riders (十八騎), Kong Tun (孔豚), as tún (豚) used to be phonetically similar to cháng (萇). In 309, after Shi Le's conquered the commanderies of Julu and Changshan, Kong Chang was appointed as Shi's "talon and teeth" (爪牙) along with Zhi Xiong, Kui An, Tao Bao and Lu Ming (逯明).

In 311, Shi Le captured the Jin minister, Wang Yan and many other officials who were preparing Sima Yue's funeral. Before Shi Le decided to execute them all, he noticed the prince Sima Fan (司馬範) who was the only one who kept a calm expression. Shi Le asked Kong Chang for his advice, whether he should recruit Fan into his ranks. Kong Chang disagreed, telling him, "They are princes and nobles of Jin, one and all. They will be no use to you in the end." Although Shi Le took his advice, he also decided not to kill the prisoners by the sword, but rather by having his men push down a wall on them to crush them.

The following year, Kong Chang participated in Shi Le's attack on Sima Rui's base in Jianye. However, the campaign was struck by disaster early on when a storm broke out and half of Shi Le's army died of hunger. He gathered his generals to plan out his next move as Sima Rui's army approached. Kong Chang and Zhi Xiong recommended that they launch a night raid on Shouchun before breaking through Danyang. Shi Le considered it but at the advice of Zhang Bin, he decided to abandon the campaign to shift his focus to Yecheng, although he did carry out an attack on Shouchun to demoralize the Jin army.

As Shi Le returned north, his army continued to suffer from hunger, with many in the ranks even resorting to cannibalism. To make matter worse, Jin's Inspector of Jizhou, Xiang Bing (向冰), was defending Fangtou (枋頭, in modern Hebi, Henan), and Shi Le feared that they would be attacked if he tries to cross the Yellow River. Once more through Zhang Bin's advice, Shi Le ordered Kong Chang and Zhi Xiong to capture Xiang Bing's ships at Wenshi Crossing (文石津, around present-day Yanji County, Henan) to use them against him. Xiang Bing was captured, and Shi Le continued his advance to Yecheng. Shi Le's attack on Yecheng saw a promising start, but he later shifted his focus and occupied Xiangguo instead.

Later that year, Shi Le attacked the city of Yuanxiang (苑鄕, in present-day Hebei and Beijing), The Youzhou warlord, Wang Jun sent his general and chieftain of the Xianbei Duan tribe Duan Jilujuan to repel him. Duan laid siege on Shi Le's capital Xiangguo which worried Shi as his generals failed to rout the chieftain. Most of his generals recommend that they wait for them to retreat before attacking, but Kong Chang and Zhang Bin proposed that they carry out a swift and surprise attack on the enemy's prized general, Duan Mobo. Kong Chang led troops against Mobo and retreated back to the city where Mobo was tricked into pursuing and was captured. Duan Jilujuan retreated and Kong struck a successful counter-attack as they fled, ending the siege.

In 313, Kong Chang was sent to capture Dingling (定陵縣) in Yingchuan Commandery which was under Wang Jun. Kong successfully did so and killed the Inspector of Yanzhou, Tian Hui (田徽). Many of the populace of the province under Bao Sheng (薄盛) surrendered to Shi Le soon after.

During Shi Le's siege of Tiancheng (坫城, around present-day Shanxi) in 316, the Inspector of Bingzhou, Liu Kun, sent his recently acquired army under Ji Dan (箕澹) to relief the city. Shi Le made Kong Chang his Vanguard General and Kong greatly routed Ji Dan's army, forcing him to abandon Liu Kun and flee to Dai commandery. Kong Chang pursued Ji Dan and killed him at Dai. Kong Chang's victory caused Liu Kun's army to collapse and prompted his Chief Clerk, Li Hong (李弘) to hand over Bingzhou to Shi Le. Shortly after, Kong Chang campaigned against the bandits Ma Yan (馬嚴) and Feng Zhu (馮䐗) but was recalled after Shi Le decided to wait for their surrender instead.

Between 319 and 321, he participated in the campaign against Duan Pidi and Shao Xu. In 319, Kong Chang conquered all of Pidi's territory in Youzhou, forcing him to join the Jin loyalist Shao Xu at Laoling (樂陵郡; around present-day Yangxin County, Shandong). The next year, he and Shi Hu attacked the exposed Shao Xu at Yanci (厭次, around present-day Dezhou, Shandong) after Pidi decided to pursue Duan Mobo in Jicheng. Kong Chang took 11 of Shao Xu's camps while Shi Hu besieged and later captured Shao Xu. Duan Pidi managed to fight his way back to Yanci, so Kong Chang campaigned against him. However, Kong had been complacent with his recent victories and did not prepare his defences. As a result, he was taken by surprise and driven back by Pidi's brother, Duan Wenyang. His final mention in history comes in 321, during the final assault on Duan Pidi in Yanci where he seized many of his cities. Pidi was finally defeated and captured later that year. Kong Chang would cease to appear in records from this point on.
