= Qi Hong (Jin dynasty) =

Western Jin dynasty general (died 312)

- 祁弘
- Born: Unknown
- Died: 312; Guangzong County, Hebei
- Occupation: Military general

Qi Hong (died 312) was a military general of the Jin dynasty (266–420). He served under the Inspector of Youzhou, Wang Jun, and during the War of the Eight Princes, he was instrumental in the defeat of the Prince of Chengdu, Sima Ying and the Prince of Hejian, Sima Yong. He also defeated the Han-Zhao general and future founder of the Later Zhao, Shi Le on one occasion, but was killed in their second encounter.

== Life ==
Virtually nothing is known about Qi Hong's background, but by 304, he was serving as a registrar under the Inspector of Youzhou, Wang Jun. In August 304, Wang Jun and the Duke of Dongying, Sima Teng began a campaign against the Prince of Chengdu, Sima Ying. Qi Hong was made the vanguard general, and at Pingji (平棘, in modern day Zhao County, Hebei), he defeated Sima Ying's general, Shi Chao. Qi Hong and the rest of Wang Jun's forces captured Sima Ying's base in Yecheng and proceeded to carry out a sack.

In 305, Wang Jun joined a coalition led by the Prince of Donghai, Sima Yue, to retrieve Emperor Hui of Jin, who had been forcibly relocated to Chang'an by the Prince of Hejian, Sima Yong. Wang Jun sent Qi Hong with Xianbei and Wuhuan "charging cavalry" to serve in Sima Yue's vanguard. In June 306, Qi Hong and his allies attack Sima Yong's generals, Peng Sui (彭隨) and Diao Mo (刁默) and defeated them. They then defeated Ma Zhan (馬瞻) and Guo Wei (郭偉) at the Ba River (霸水; in present-day Xi'an, Shaanxi), causing Sima Yong to flee alone in a panic. Finally, they captured Chang'an, where Qi Hong allowed his Xianbei troops to sack the city, this time killing more than 20,000 people. Qi Hong and the others escorted Emperor Hui on an oxcart east to Luoyang.

In 309, the Han-Zhao general, Shi Le, attacked Changshan Commandery. Qi Hong and the Xianbei chieftain, Duan Wuwuchen, led more than 10,000 cavalry to subdue him. The two faced Shi Le at Mount Feilong (飛龍山), where they greatly routed him. Shi Le was forced to retreat to Liyang County (黎陽縣; present-day Xun County, Henan). In 310, Qi Hong campaigned against Han's Grand General Who Conquers the North and Inspector of Jizhou, Liu Ling (劉靈) at Guangzong County and killed him. In 312, Wang Jun sent Qi Hong to attack Shi Le again at Guangzong. However, his army was met with a thick fog when they arrived at the area. Qi Hong attempted to withdraw, but accidentally encountered Shi Le. This time, he was defeated and killed.
