= Duan Pidi =

Duan-Xianbei chieftain and Jin dynasty vassal

- 段匹磾

Inspector of Youzhou (幽州刺史)
- In office 314–321
- Monarch: Emperor Min of Jin/Emperor Yuan of Jin

Champion General (冠軍將軍)
- In office 321–321
- Monarch: Shi Le

Personal details
- Born: Unknown
- Died: c.320s
- Relations: Duan Jilujuan (brother); Duan Wenyang (brother); Duan Shujun (brother)
- Parent: Duan Wuwuchen (father)

Duan Pidi (fl. 312–321) was a Duan-Xianbei chieftain during the Jin dynasty (266–420) and Sixteen Kingdoms period. He was the brother of chieftain Duan Jilujuan, and served as his general in the Jin's war with the Han-Zhao state. After Jilujuan made peace with Han in 313, Pidi led his branch of the tribe to continue fighting Han from Ji. Pidi became the most powerful Jin vassal in the north, but his decision to kill his ally, Liu Kun and a civil war with his cousin, Duan Mobo severely weakened him. In 319, he was forced to flee to another Jin vassal, Shao Xu. He was eventually captured by the Later Zhao in 321, and despite receiving favourable treatment from its ruler, Shi Le, he would later be executed in fear he would rebel.

== Early life and career ==
Duan Pidi was a member of the Xianbei Duan clan of Liaoxi. His father, Duan Wuwuchen was the head of the clan between 303 and 311. At the start of the 4th century, the Duan clan allied with the Youzhou warlord, Wang Jun and played an important role in Wang's campaign against the Prince of Chengdu, Sima Ying, during the War of the Eight Princes. The Duan tribe and Wang Jun continued their association after the war, combining their efforts to stop the new and growing state of Han-Zhao. Some time around 310, Pidi's elder brother, Duan Jilujuan, succeeded Wuwuchen as chieftain following his death.

Duan Pidi participated during Jilujuan's attack on Xiangguo in 312, as part of Wang Jun's plan to divert the Han general, Shi Le, away from the rebelling city of Yuanxiang (苑鄕, in present-day Hebei and Beijing). The Duan forces fought Shi Le at Xiangguo but their star general, Pidi's cousin, Duan Mobo, was captured in battle. Despite being a prisoner, Mobo was treated with courtesy by Shi Le, which pleased Jilujuan. Because of this, the Duan tribe ceased their enmity with Shi Le and distanced themselves from Wang Jun.

Wang Jun was captured and executed by Shi Le in 314. After Wang's defeat, Shi Le appointed a man named Liu Han (劉翰) to be acting Inspector of Youzhou based in Ji. However, Liu Han instead fled to Duan Pidi, who he offered control over Ji. Pidi accepted on his own accord before occupying the city and submitting himself to Sima Rui, the paramount leader of the Jin in the south. For this, Sima Rui made Pidi Jin's new Inspector of Youzhou. Pidi also urged Shi Le's Administrator of Leling, Shao Xu, to submit to the Jin prince as well. Shao Xu did so, and Shi Le immediately responded by sending his army to besiege him. However, Pidi sent his younger brother, Duan Wenyang to reinforce Shao Xu, causing Shi Le to retreat.

== As Inspector of Youzhou ==
=== Alliance with Liu Kun ===
In 316, Shi Le sent his nephew Shi Hu to attack the Administrator of Wei Commandery, Liu Yan. Pidi sent Wenyang to rescue Liu Yan, and while the commandery fell, Liu Yan was safely retrieved. Later that year, the Inspector of Bingzhou, Liu Kun lost his province to Shi Le. Liu Kun was left with nowhere to go, so Pidi sent a letter to invite him to his base. Liu Kun took what was left of his army to meet with Pidi and the two men quickly became friends. Forming a brotherly bond, Pidi and Liu Kun arranged their relatives to marry one another to further cement their friendship.

The next year, Pidi and Liu Kun swore an oath of alliance by smearing their lips with blood. Afterwards, they sent their respective envoys to deliver a joint petition urging Sima Rui to claim the imperial title. Liu Kun chose his nephew Wen Jiao to deliver the petition, while Pidi chose his Chief Clerk of the Left, Rong Shao (榮卲). After their envoys reached the southern capital, Pidi proclaimed Liu Kun as Grand Commander. In 317, he and Liu Kun planned to launch a campaign against Shi Le from Gu'an (固安; southwest of present-day Langfang, Hebei) and attempted to persuade Jilujuan into joining forces. However, at the advice of Duan Mobo, Jilujuan did not respond, and so the campaign was aborted.

=== Arrest and execution of Liu Kun ===
Jilujuan died in early 318 and was succeeded by his uncle, Duan Shefuchen. Pidi left Ji to attend his funeral but without his knowledge, Duan Mobo manipulated Shefuchen into believing that Pidi was about to usurp his power. At Zuobeiping, Shefuchen attacked Pidi but was betrayed by Mobo who assassinated him while his and Pidi's forces were fighting. Mobo then took command of the assault and routed Pidi. During this, Mobo capturing Liu Kun's son Liu Qun (劉群), who was escorting Pidi to the funeral.

Mobo treated Liu Qun well and considered supporting Liu Kun into becoming the new Inspector of Youzhou. He had Liu Qun write a letter to his father asking him to work as an agent within Pidi's camp, but his envoy was caught by Pidi's scouts along the way. Liu Kun knew nothing of the letter when Pidi confronted him with it. Pidi did not suspect Liu Kun, and Liu Kun himself assured him that he had no intentions to betray Pidi. Pidi let him off at first, but his younger brother, Duan Shujun (段叔軍), was able to get his brother to reconsider his actions.

Pidi quickly had Liu Kun arrested. Liu Kun's son, Liu Zun (劉遵), upon hearing his father's arrest, mounted a defence in his camp but was defeated by Pidi. Two of Liu Kun's generals, Pilü Song (辟閭嵩) and Han Ju (韓據), also planned to retaliate, but Pidi had the conspirators executed after their plot leaked. On 22 June, with consent from Sima Rui's general, Wang Dun, Pidi claimed that he had received an imperial edict to arrest Liu Kun and subsequently executed him along with his four sons and nephews via strangulation.

Although Liu Kun had long helped the Jin in attempting to restore its authority in the north, Sima Rui refused to punish Duan Pidi and forbid anyone from mourning Liu Kun, as he and most of the court saw Pidi as a powerful and valuable asset. Despite Sima Rui's leniency, Pidi had underestimated Liu Kun's popularity, and the breaking of his oath caused many of the Han Chinese and Hu people to lose their trust in him.

== Alliance with Shao Xu ==
=== Fleeing to Shao Xu ===
Not long after, Duan Mobo seized the opportunity to lead his cavalry against Duan Pidi. Pidi tried to flee to Shao Xu at Leling (樂陵; around present-day Yangxin County, Shandong), but along the way, he was routed by Shi Le's general, Shi Yue (石越; not to be confused with the Former Qin general of the same name, Shi Yue) at Mount Yan. Pidi retreated back to Ji while Mobo declared himself the new Inspector of Youzhou.

Duan Pidi's domain also began to suffer from famine. When Shao Xu sent his nephew, Shao Cun (邵存) to search for food supplies in Pingyuan, Pidi sent Duan Wenyang to assist them, but they were defeated by Shi Hu. By 319, many of Pidi's followers scattered due to lack of food, while Shi Le's general Kong Chang invaded and conquered all of Youzhou's commanderies. Pidi initially abandoned Ji for Shanggu, but when the Prince of Dai, Tuoba Yulü, attacked him there, he abandoned his wife and children and made another attempt to flee to Shao Xu, this time successfully doing so.

=== Battle of Yanci ===
In 320, Pidi's army was once again harassed by Mobo. Pidi pleaded to Shao Xu to assist him in getting revenge on Mobo, so the two men headed out and routed Mobo. Pidi followed up his victory by attacking Ji together with Duan Wenyang to reclaim his old base. This proved a fatal mistake as Shao Xu was left exposed to Shi Le. Shi Hu attacked Yanci (厭次, around present-day Dezhou, Shandong) and captured Shao Xu. News of Shao Xu's defeat reached Pidi, causing him to rush back to save the city. Duan Wenyang helped the army fight their way back into the city, where Pidi commanded the defence together with Shao Xu's family. In the middle of the year, Wenyang defeated Kong Chang, but it was not enough to completely repel the Zhao army.

Fighting continued into 321. Shi Hu attacked Pidi at Yanci again, while Kong Chang occupied the inner cities. Duan Wenyang volunteered himself to lead a daring charge with his cavalry to drive back the invaders. Wenyang fought and killed dozens of Shi Hu's soldiers. Supposedly, even after his horse had collapsed, Wenyang fought with his spear, and when his spear snapped, he fought with his blade. This lasted for a day but Wenyang was eventually captured by Shi Hu. His capture lowered the morale of the city's defenders.

== Defeat and death ==
Faced with imminent defeat, Pidi planned to flee alone to the south to serve Sima Rui. However, Shao Xu's brother, Shao Ji (邵洎) detained him and handed over Sima Rui's envoy, Wang Ying (王英) to Shi Hu. Shortly after, Shao Ji and his sons bound themselves to coffins and went out to surrender. When Pidi met with Shi Hu, he said to him, "I have received the favor of the Jin, and my ambition was to destroy you. It is unfortunate that things have come to this, but I cannot respect you." Shi Le and Shi Hu had always respected Pidi, so much so that after his capture, Shi Hu lifted him up in the air and had him saluted as a gesture of companionship. Pidi was made Champion General, while Wenyang was made General of the Household Gentlemen of the Left.

Despite Shi Le's favour, Pidi remained loyal to the Jin. Pidi often dressed himself in clothing used in the Jin court and held the imperial staff of authority that Sima Rui gave him. Shi Le was worried that Pidi's attitude foreboded a future revolt. After some time, Shi Le had Pidi put to death along with Wenyang and Shao Xu.

== Descendants ==
According to the Book of Zhou, Duan Pidi was the ancestor of the Kudi (庫狄) family. The record claims that his descendants changed their family name from Duan to avoid misfortune.

Duan Pidi Duan tribe Born: ? Died: c. 321
Regnal titles
Preceded by Duan Shefuchen	Chieftain of the Duan; 318–321	Succeeded by Duan Mobo
