= Duan Ya =

Chieftain of the Duan (325)

Duan Ya (段牙) (died 325) was a chieftain of the Duan tribe during the Sixteen Kingdoms period.

== Life ==
Nothing is known about Duan Ya's early life, except that he was the younger brother of the chieftain, Duan Mobo. He succeeded to the chieftaincy following the death of his brother in 325.

Under his brief leadership, the Duan tribe maintained good relations with the Murong tribe in the east. Their chieftain, Murong Hui suggested to Duan Ya that he should relocate his capital. Duan Ya agreed and left his former base of Lingzhi, but many of his tribesmen opposed the decision. A grandson of Duan Jilujuan, Duan Liao took advantage of the people's resentment to usurp Duan Ya's position. By the end of the year, Duan Ya was killed, and Duan Liao proclaimed himself the new chieftain.

Duan Ya Duan Born: ? Died: 325
Regnal titles
Preceded by Duan Mobo	Chieftain of the Duan; 325–325	Succeeded by Duan Liao
