= Rilujuan =

Duan-Xianbei founder and chieftain

- Traditional Chinese: 日陸眷
- Simplified Chinese: 日陆眷
Transcriptions
Standard Mandarin
- Hanyu Pinyin: Rìlùjuàn
- Wade–Giles: Jih-lu-chüan

Rilujuan (fl. 3rd century), also known as Jiulujuan (就陸眷), was a Xianbei chieftain and founder of the Duan tribe.

== Life ==
At a young age, Rilujuan was sold as a slave to a Wuhuan family in Yuyang Commandery, the Kunuguan (庫傉官) during a period of unrest. According to the Book of Wei, there was once a gathering of the chieftains from the various tribes in You province. The chieftains brought their own spittoons to the event, all except for the Kunuguan, who instead spat inside Rilujuan's mouth. Swallowing his spit, Rilujuan looked up to the sky towards the west and said, "May my lord's wisdom and fortune be transferred to my belly."

Later, a great famine broke out in Yuyang. Due to his strength, the Kunuguan ordered Rilujuan to scour for food in Liaoxi Commandery, but he never returned. Instead, he got together a number of exiles and formed a powerful group in Liaoxi. They occupied the abandoned Han dynasty city of Lingzhi (令支, in present-day Qian'an, Hebei), which became the base of the Duan tribe.

Rilujuan died in an unknown year and was succeeded by his younger brother, Qizhen. Though the chieftaincy was passed over to his brother, Rilujuan had at least one son, as evident from his grandson, Duan Liao, who was also the tribe's last chieftain.

Rilujuan Duan Born: ? Died: ?
Regnal titles
Preceded by Position established	Chieftain of the Duan; 3rd century	Succeeded by Qizhen
