= Duan Shefuchen =

Chieftain of the Duan (318)

Duan Shefuchen (段涉復辰) (died 318), also known as Jiefuzhen (截附真) and Duan Chen (段辰) was a chieftain of the Duan tribe during the Jin dynasty (266–420) and Sixteen Kingdoms period.

== Life ==
Duan Shefuchen was the younger brother of the chieftain, Duan Wuwuchen. When Wuwuchen died in 310 or 311, the chieftaincy was passed over to Wuwuchen's son, Duan Jilujuan. Under his nephew, Shefuchen was bestowed the position of Chanyu and the title of Duke of Guangning by the Jin dynasty.

In 317, Shefuchen's nephew, Duan Pidi and the exiled Western Jin Inspector of Bing province, Liu Kun called upon his Shefuchen, Duan Jilujuan, Duan Mobo and others to join in his campaign against the Han-Zhao general, Shi Le at Gu'an. However, at the advice of Duan Mobo, who was secretly working with Shi Le, both Shefuchen and Jilujuan ignored his call, as Pidi was a junior kinsman and would most probably claim full credit if the campaign turned out successful. With no support, Duan Pidi and Liu Kun aborted their campaign.

In 318, Duan Jilujuan died of illness, and as his son was still young at the time, Duan Shefuchen was therefore chosen as the new chieftain of the Duan. Upon hearing his brother's death, Duan Pidi left his base at Jicheng for the Duan capital of Lingzhi (令支, in present-day Qian'an, Hebei) to attend the funeral. However, Duan Mobo warned Shefuchen that Pidi had intentions to take control of the chieftaincy. Heeding Mobo's words, Shefuchen sent his troops to intercept Pidi when he entered Youbeiping. With his uncle's guard lowered, Mobo killed Shefuchen along with his children, brothers and partisans before proclaiming himself the new Chanyu.

Duan Shefuchen Duan tribe Born: ? Died: 318
Regnal titles
Preceded by Duan Jilujuan	Chieftain of the Duan; 318–318	Succeeded by Duan Mobo
Preceded by Duan Jilujuan	Chieftain of the Duan; 318–318	Succeeded by Duan Pidi
