= Qizhen =

Chieftain of the Duan

Qizhen (Chinese: 乞珍; pinyin: Qǐzhēn) (fl. 3rd century) was a Xianbei chieftain of the Duan tribe.

== Life ==
Qizhen was the younger brother of Rilujian, the first chieftain of the Duan tribe in the Liaoxi Commandery. After Rilujian's death, which occurred in an unknown year, Qizhen succeeded him as chieftain. According to the Zizhi Tongjian, in 289, Duan Jie (段階), a Duan chieftain, married his daughter, Lady Duan, to Murong Hui, the chieftain of the Murong tribe. Lady Duan later gave birth to Murong Huang, Murong Ren and Murong Zhao (慕容昭). Duan Jie is not mentioned in either the Book of Jin or Book of Wei, and it is speculated by modern scholars that he was actually Qizhen. It is not known when Qizhen died, but his son, Duan Wuwuchen was recorded as leading the tribe in 303.

Qizhen Duan Born: ? Died: Before 303
Regnal titles
Preceded by Rilujuan	Chieftain of the Duan late 3rd century	Succeeded by Duan Wuwuchen
