= Duan Jilujuan =

Chieftain of the Duan (310–318)

Duan Jilujuan (段疾陸眷) (died 318) was a chieftain of the Duan-Xianbei tribe during the Jin dynasty (266–420) and Sixteen Kingdoms period. Succeeding his father as the Duke of Liaoxi, he initially maintained the Duan's alliance with the Inspector of You province, Wang Jun, but following the Battle of Xiangguo in 312, he reached an agreement with the Han-Zhao general, Shi Le to break off the alliance and withdraw from the conflict. Jilujuan remained neutral for the remainder of his reign, although his brother, Duan Pidi led a branch of their tribe on his own to continue resisting Shi Le.

== Life ==
=== Early reign ===
Duan Jilujuan was the son of Duan Wuwuchen, the head chief of the Duan tribe and the Duke of Liaoxi. It is not known when he succeeded his father, but the last known historical record on his father was dated to November 310; by December 311, Jilujuan was serving as the tribe's head chief. In December 311, the Inspector of Bing Province, Liu Kun sent his kinsman, Liu Xi (劉希) to Zhongshan to accept the surrender of 30,000 people from Dai, Shanggu and Guangning (廣寧郡; in present-day Zhangjiakou, Hebei) commanderies in You province. The Inspector of You and Jilujuan's ally, Wang Jun was furious, so he sent his general, Hu Ju (胡矩) and Jilujuan to attack Liu Xi. They killed Liu Xi and returned the people to their commanderies.

=== Battle of Xiangguo (312) ===
In 312, Wang Jun raised an army to attack the Han-Zhao general, Shi Le at Xiangguo. Jilujuan joined with Wang Jun's general, Wang Chang (王昌) for the campaign, bringing along his brothers, Duan Pidi and Duan Wenyang, and his cousin, Duan Mobo. When their forces arrived at Xiangguo, Jilujuan camped at Zhuyang (渚陽; in present-day Xingtai, Hebei). He defeated several generals sent by Shi Le before constructing siege weapons to attack Xiangguo. Jilujuan then led his troops to assault the northern wall, but while their guards were down, Shi Le's general, Kong Chang suddenly led a sortie to attack Duan Mobo. He was unable to overcome Mobo and fell back into the city, and Mobo gave chase. After Mobo entered the rampart gate, he was captured by Shi Le's army. Jilujuan ordered a retreat, but Kong Chang pursued them, killing and capturing many of their soldiers.

With Mobo held hostage, Shi Le sent a messenger to Jilujuan requesting peace. Jilujuan agreed despite Wenyang's objection, and he sent armoured horses, gold and silver to Shi Le as gifts. In exchange for Mobo, he also sent three of Mobo's younger brother as hostages to Shi Le. Shi Le sent his adopted brother, Shi Hu to Zhuyang, where he swore an oath of brotherhood with Jilujuan. Finally, Jilujuan ordered his army to withdraw, and without the Duan to support him, Wang Chang also retreated, thus lifting the siege of Xiangguo.

=== Later reign ===
In 313, Wang Jun summoned Jilujuan to participate in another campaign against Shi Le, but this time, Jilujuan did not respond. In anger, Wang Jun bribed the Tuoba tribe to campaign against the Duan and called the Murong tribe and other local commanders to join in as well. The head of the Tuoba, Tuoba Yilu sent his son, Tuoba Liuxiu to join Wang Jun's forces, but Jilujuan defeated him. Meanwhile, the head of the Murong, Murong Hui ordered his son, Murong Han to attack the Duan. Murong Han captured Tuhe and Xincheng (新城; northeast of present-day Shenyang, Liaoning) commanderies, but when he reached Yangle (陽樂; southwest of present-day Yi County, Liaoning), he was informed of Liuxiu's defeat, so he retreated to Tuhe.

In 314, Shi Le annexed You province after he defeated and executed Wang Jun. Around this time, Wang Jun's official, Yang Yu fled to Lingzhi (令支, in present-day Qian'an, Hebei), the base of the Duan. Jilujuan, having heard of his fame, summoned him and treated him well, appointing him as a minister. While Jilujuan continued to uphold his neutrality, his brother Duan Pidi was offered by the rebel general, Liu Han (劉翰) control over Wang Jun's former base in Jicheng. Pidi accepted and affirmed his loyalty to Jin by opposing Shi Le, which Jilujuan appears to neither condoned nor condemned.

In 317, Jilujuan was one of the many officials to submit a memorial to the Prince of Langye, Sima Rui to take the imperial throne at Jiankang. That same year, Duan Pidi and Liu Kun were planning to campaign against Shi Le, and they asked Jilujuan, Duan Mobo and Duan Shefuchen to join them at Gu'an. While Jilujuan and Shefuchen initially obliged, Mobo refused to follow as he strongly supported Shi Le. He even told Jilujuan and Shefuchen that it would be shameful to be accepting orders from a junior kinsman, and that Pidi would likely claim full credit for the campaign if it were successful. In the end, Jilujuan and Shefuchen withdrew, and Pidi was forced to drop the campaign.

Jilujuan died of illness in 318. His son was too young to succeed him at the time, so he was instead succeeded by his uncle, Shefuchen.

Duan Jilujuan Duan Born: ? Died: 318
Regnal titles
Preceded by Duan Wuwuchen	Chieftain of the Duan; 310 or 311–318	Succeeded by Duan Shefuchen
