= Duan Wuwuchen =

Chieftain of the Duan

Duan Wuwuchen (段務勿塵) (died December 310 or 311), also known as Duan Wumuchen (段務目塵), was a chieftain of the Duan-Xianbei during the Jin dynasty (266–420) and Sixteen Kingdoms period. A vassal of the Western Jin, his leadership saw the Duan begin actively providing military assistance to the Jin through his alliance with the Inspector of You Province, Wang Jun. For his merits, he was named the Duke of Liaoxi, a title that was passed down to his successors.

== Life ==
Duan Wuwuchen was the son of the Duan chieftain, Qizhen. Succeeding his father as chieftain, Wuwuchen was based in Liaoxi Commandery and was a vassal to the Western Jin dynasty. He had over 30,000 families under his leadership, and commanded a force of between 40,000 and 50,000 cavalry units.

In 303, the Chief Controller of You province, Wang Jun sought to protect himself in light of the Jin civil wars by allying with the surrounding Xianbei and Wuhuan tribes. Wang Jun formed an alliance with the Duan by marrying his daughter to Wuwuchen, the two sides then began working closely with one another. In 304, Wuwuchen participated in Wang Jun's campaign against the Prince of Chengdu, Sima Ying. Their forces captured Ying's base in Ye, during which the Xianbei troops pillaged and abducted many of the women in the city. As punishment, Wang Jun had 8,000 of them involved in the abductions drowned in the Yi River.

Wang Jun continued to employ the Xianbei when he joined the Prince of Donghai, Sima Yue in his war against the Prince of Hejian, Sima Yong from 305 to 306. The Xianbei cavalry played an important role in securing Sima Yue's victory, but they also participated in the sack of Chang'an which killed more than 20,000 people. In 307, after Emperor Huai of Jin's ascension, Wang Jun, now Inspector of You Province, petitioned for the imperial court to grant Duan Wuwuchen the title of Duke of Liaoxi. Dapiaohua (大飄滑), a collateral member of the Duan, and his brother, Datuweng (大屠甕), a member of the Wuhuan tribe led by Jiezhu (渴末), were also appointed as pro-Jin kings.

In 309, Shi Le, a general of the Han-Zhao dynasty, attacked Changshan Commandery. Wang Jun sent his subordinate, Qi Hong and Wuwuchen with over 10,000 cavalry to suppress Shi Le. They fought at Mount Feilong (飛龍山) and won a victory over Shi Le, reportedly killing more than 10,000 of his soldiers and forcing him to retreat to Liyang (黎陽縣; present-day Xun County, Henan).

On 30 November 310, Wuwuchen was bestowed the title of Grand Chanyu. Wuwuchen died not long after, although the exact date of his death is unknown. He was succeeded by his son, Duan Jilujuan, who first appears as Duke of Liaoxi in 311, so Wuwuchen must have died some time between late 310 and 311. Wuwuchen's brother, Duan Shefuchen succeeded Jilujuan in 318.

Duan Wuwuchen Duan Born: ? Died: 310 or 311
Regnal titles
Preceded by Qizhen	Chieftain of the Duan ?–310 or 311	Succeeded by Duan Jilujuan
