= Wang Jun (Pengzu) =

Jin dynasty general and warlord (252–314)

- 王浚

Inspector of Youzhou (幽州刺史)
- In office c. September 306 – April 314
- Monarch: Emperor Hui of Jin/Emperor Huai of Jin/Emperor Min of Jin
- Preceded by: Wang Bin
- Succeeded by: Duan Pidi

Personal details
- Born: 252
- Died: 4 April 314 (aged 62)
- Spouses: Wen Can; Wei Xiu (Note: niece of Wei Guan); Hua Fang; Lady Cui (Note: sister of Cui Bi)
- Children: Wang Zhou; Wang Yi; Wang Ze; Wang Shao; Wang Li
- Parents: Wang Chen (father); Lady Zhao (趙氏) (mother)
- Courtesy name: Pengzu (彭祖)
- Peerage: Duke of Boling (博陵公)

Wang Jun (252 – 4 April 314), courtesy name Pengzu, was a military general and warlord of the Western Jin dynasty of China. By the time of Sima Lun's usurpation of the Western Jin throne, he was established as a military commander in You Province. Although he became a target of Sima Ying as the War of the Eight Princes unfolded, he survived the chaos, ultimately supporting Sima Yue's faction. At the time of the Disaster of Yongjia which saw the collapse of Jin control in northern China, he was one of Jin's few remaining provincial powers in the north. However among claims of imperial ambitions and corruption, he clashed not only with northern tribal powers but also his Jin dynasty rival Liu Kun the Inspector of Bingzhou, before his final defeat and death at the hands of Shi Le, who had previously won Wang Jun's trust.

== Early life and career ==
Wang Jun was born to a concubine of Wang Chen of the prominent Wang clan of Jinyang County (晉陽; southwest of present-day Taiyuan, Shanxi) in Taiyuan commandery. His mother was from a poor commoner family, so Wang Chen refused to acknowledge Wang Jun as his son. Only Wang Jun's uncle, Wang Hun, saw potential in him and believed he would one day be a part of the Three Excellencies in times of chaos. In 266, Wang Chen died without a legitimate son, so his relatives established Wang Jun, then aged 14, as his heir. Wang Jun inherited Wang Chen's title of Duke of Boling and was appointed Chief Commandant of Escorting Cavalry by the court.

Wang Jun became a Regular Mounted Attendant in 282. In 291, the court transferred him to serve as a Regular Attendant and later moved him to Commandant of the Surpassing Riders and General of the Right. Soon, Wang Jun became the Imperial Corps Commander and guarded Xuchang.

== War of the Eight Princes ==
=== Consolidating Youzhou ===
In 299, during Empress Jia's rule behind the curtains, she had the Crown Prince, Sima Yu, under house arrest in Xuchang. The following year, Wang Jun and the eunuch Sun Lü (孫慮) assisted her in poisoning Sima Yu. Wang Jun received the title General Who Pacifies The North and Imperial Inspector of Qingzhou. After a while, the court moved him to General Who Calms The Northern Frontiers and Chief Controller of Youzhou. While in Youzhou, Wang Jun sensed that civil war would soon ensue in northern China. Thus, he began initiating alliances with the neighbouring barbarian tribes to secure his position. He married his two daughters; one to the chieftain of the Xianbei Duan tribe, Duan Wuwuchen and another to a general of the Xianbei Yuwen tribe, Sunuyan (素怒延).

In 301, Emperor Hui of Jin's regent, Sima Lun, deposed Hui and declared himself emperor. The three princes, Sima Ying, Sima Yong and Sima Jiong, promptly began an alliance to restore Emperor Hui. Wang Jun remained neutral throughout the war and refused the send out his troops. He even confiscated letters from the coalition calling to arms in Youzhou to prevent anyone from joining them. Sima Ying was particularly frustrated at Wang Jun's actions and considered attacking him but decided not to due to more pressing issues. After overthrowing Sima Lun, Wang Jun received the office of General Who Secures the North.

=== War with Sima Ying ===
In 304, Sima Ying and Sima Yong became Jin's paramount leaders after killing the Prince of Changsha, Sima Ai. While in power, Sima Ying sought to eliminate Wang Jun, still begrudging him for his conduct in 301. Wang Jun himself was also not pleased with the outcome of Sima Ying and Sima Ai's war. Sima Ying appointed his trusted subordinate, He Yan (和演), as Inspector of Youzhou with orders to assassinate Wang Jun. He Yan colluded with the Wuhuan Chanyu, Shen Deng (審登), and when the two travelled with Wang Jun to Qingquan (清泉; south of present-day Beijing), they agreed to have him killed there. However, a heavy storm drenched their troops' equipment and foiled their plans on the day of their attempt.

Shen Deng perceived the storm as a sign that the Heavens favoured Wang Jun, so he defected to Wang Jun and revealed the plot. In response, Wang Jun and Shen Deng besieged He Yan and forced him to surrender. After executing He Yan, Wang Jun assumed total control over Youzhou. Sima Ying tried summoning Wang Jun to court, but Wang Jun camped at Jizhou instead. Wang Jun brought along Duan Wuwuchen and a Wuhuan chieftain, Jiezhu (羯朱), and allied with the Inspector of Bingzhou, Sima Teng. They defeated Sima Ying's general, Wang Bin (王斌), and as they approached Sima Ying's base in Yecheng, Wang Jun's vanguard general, Qi Hong, also defeated Shi Chao. Sima Ying panicked and fled to Luoyang, allowing Wang Jun to occupy his city. The Xianbei had Yecheng sacked and abducted many women from the city. After Wang Jun returned to Jicheng, he executed many of the Xianbei soldiers who partook in the abductions, and around 8,000 bodies reportedly filled the Yi River (易水; in present-day Yi County, Hebei).

=== Sima Yue's coalition ===
In 305, Wang Jun was one of the many governors east of Luoyang to acclaim the Prince of Donghai, Sima Yue, as coalition leader to overthrow Sima Yong and bring Emperor Hui back to Luoyang from Chang'an. Wang Jun lent his Xianbei troops to the Prince of Fanyang, Sima Xiao (司馬虓), which proved vital to defeating Sima Yong's powerful ally, Liu Qiao. Wang Jun later had Qi Hong lead his elite Xianbei and Wuhuan charging cavalry to serve in Sima Yue's vanguard. In June 306, Qi Hong and others entered Chang'an, and Wang Jun's Xianbei troops sacked the city, leaving 20,000 dead in their wake.

After Emperor Hui returned to Luoyang, Wang Jun became Grand General of Agile Cavalry, Commander over the eastern tribes and the military affairs of Hebei, and acting Inspector of Youzhou for his contributions. The court also merged the state of Yan into Wang Jun's fief. In 307, Emperor Huai of Jin ascended the throne. He appointed Wang Jun Minister of Works and Protector of the Wuhuan.

== Conflicts with Shi Le and Liu Kun ==
=== Early success against Shi Le ===
While the civil war was raging in 304, Liu Yuan, a nobleman of the Five Divisions in Bing province, rebelled and founded the Han-Zhao dynasty. Though Sima Yue had won the war by 307, northern China was now faced with the growing Han threat. On 2 April 308, Wang Jun had his first encounter with the Han general, Shi Le, who invaded Changshan Commandery. He dispatched Duan Wenyang of the Duan tribe and drove Shi Le out, forcing him to retreat south to Nanyang Commandery.

In September or October 309, Shi Le invaded Changshan again and sent his generals to Zhongshan, Boling and Gaoyang commanderies to receive the surrender of the local populace. Wang Jun thus sent his general, Qi Hong and Duan Wuwuchen to deal with Shi Le. Their forces fought at Mount Feilong (飛龍山, south of present-day Luquan, Shijiazhuang), where Shi Le was greatly routed and had to retreat to Liyang (黎陽; northeast of present-day Xun County, Henan). Later that year, Shi Le attacked Xindu and killed the Inspector of Jizhou, Wang Bin, so Wang Jun took advantage by assuming control over Jizhou as acting Inspector.

In October or November 310, Shi Le captured Xiangcheng County and killed the local prefect, Cui Lu (崔曠). As Shi Le advanced onto Wancheng, Wang Jun sent Duan Wenyang to fight Shi Le, prompting him to retreat. Wang Jun soon ordered his general, Wang Shenshi (王申始), to attack Shi Le at Wenshi Crossing (文石津, around present-day Yanjin County, Henan), where his forces were once again victorious.

=== Conflict with Liu Kun ===
Despite serving the same state, Wang Jun soon entered a rivalry with the Inspector of Bingzhou, Liu Kun. Liu Kun had allied with the Tuoba-Xianbei chieftain, Tuoba Yilu, and in 310, petitioned to make Yilu the Duke of Dai Commandery. However, at the time, Dai Commandery was a part of Wang Jun's domain in Youzhou. When Yilu received Dai Commandery, Wang Jun refused to cede the territory, so he attacked Yilu but was routed. Because of this incident, Wang Jun bore a grudge against Liu Kun.

In 311, Emperor Huai of Jin gave out numerous promotions to his officials, including Wang Jun, whom he promoted to Grand Marshal, Palace Attendant, Grand Commander, and Chief Controller of Youzhou and Jizhou. However, before his envoys could arrive, the emperor and Luoyang were captured by Liu Yao during the Disaster of Yongjia. After the emperor's capture, Wang Jun set up an altar and chose an unknown candidate as the new Crown Prince. He then claimed that he received an imperial edict to grant appointments. Wang Jun appointed two men, Tian Hui (田徽) and Li Yun (李惲), as Inspector of Yanzhou and Inspector of Qingzhou, respectively. He made himself acting Prefect of the Masters of Writings and then appointed his subordinate, Pei Xian, and his son-in-law, Zao Song (棗嵩), Masters of Writing.

As Bingzhou's population declined, Liu Kun sent his clansman Liu Xi (劉希) to gather people from Wang Jun's territory in the commanderies of Dai, Shanggu and Guangning (廣寧郡, in present-day Hebei and Beijing). Wang Jun saw Liu Kun's action as an intrusion, so he sent his general Hu Ju (胡矩) and the new Duan chieftain, Duan Jilujuan, to attack Liu Xi. Wang Jun's forces killed Liu Xi and returned the people to their commanderies.

== Downfall and death ==
=== Decline in power ===
In 312, Han's city of Yuanxiang (苑鄕, in present-day Hebei and Beijing) surrendered to Wang Jun, prompting Shi Le to lay siege on it. In response, Wang Jun sent Wang Chang (王昌) and Duan Jilujuan to attack Shi Le's base at Xiangguo. However, Duan Jilujuan's cousin, Duan Mobo, was captured in battle, and Shi Le used him as a hostage to negotiate peace with Jilujuan. The negotiations was a turning point for Shi Le; he was able to reach a mutual understanding with the Duan, who then withdrew from Xiangguo and began distancing themselves from Wang Jun. After the Duan left, Wang Chang also retreated, and Yuanxiang fell back to the Han.

Shortly after his victory, Shi Le attacked Xindu again and killed the Inspector of Jizhou, Wang Xiang (王象), so Wang Jun replaced him with Shao Ju (邵舉). In April or May 313, Shi Le invaded Shangbai (上白; in present-day Guangzong County, Hebei) and killed Li Yun, so Wang Jun appointed Bao Sheng (薄盛) as the new Inspector of Qingzhou. In light of this recent attack, Shi le planned to send Zao Song and Duan Jilujuan on a campaign against Shi Le. However, he soon realized that the Duan had deserted him when they refused to answer his summons. Furious, Wang Jun allied with the Xianbei chiefs, Tuoba Yilu and Murong Hui, to punish them, but Jilujuan defeated the Tuoba while the Murong withdrew upon hearing their ally's defeat.

Shi Le later attacked Dingling (定陵; in present-day Xiangcheng County, Henan) and killed Tian Hui. Bao Sheng also surrendered to Shi Le, and Shi Le continued to capture more counties and commanderies in the east. As Wang Jun's influence continued to diminish, the Wuhuan leaders, Shen Guang (審廣), Jian Shang (漸裳) and Hao Xi (郝襲), all secretly defected to Shi Le's side.

=== Capture by Shi Le ===
Despite his decline, Wang Jun still had ambitions to declare himself emperor, even more so after Emperor Huai was executed in 313 by Han. He subscribed to a prophecy stating that the one to replace the Han bears the name 'High Road'. (Note: This prophecy (代漢者，當塗高也) had existed since the time of Emperor Wu of Han. The warlords Gongsun Shu and Yuan Shu had used this prophecy to justify their claim to the imperial title during the Eastern Han Dynasty. Wang Jun's father had the style name 'Chudao' (處道) which roughly translates to 'place road'.) His officials criticized him for his imperial ambitions, but Wang Jun had them executed. The gentry was disturbed by Wang Jun's violent impulses and distanced themselves from him. Wang Jun also began to neglect political affairs, leaving them in the hands of his corrupted officials such as Zao Song, Zhu Shuo (朱碩) and Tan Heng (貪橫). The three men's policies were so troublesome that many of Wang Jun's people fled to Murong Hui in Liaodong.

Hearing his situation, Shi Le contemplated attacking him. At the advice of Zhang Bin, he pretended to appear weak, sending gifts and offering his submission to Wang Jun through a letter in 313. As Wang Jun was in need of a great general after his strongest allies had abandoned, he was delighted and promptly accepted his surrender. To show his loyalty, Shi Le outwardly rejected an offer from Wang Jun's general, You Tong (游統), to rebel by killing his messenger and sending his head to Wang Jun. In early 314, Wang Jun dispatched envoys to his headquarters at Xiangguo to present him with a deer tail. Shi Le pretended to be afraid to grasp it and instead hung it on a wall to show his respect for him. Finally, he sent a petition to visit Wang Jun in the spring, intending to submit and hail him as emperor.

When spring arrived, Wang Jun was ready to accept Shi Le into his ranks. As he drew closer, Wang Jun's generals and advisers insisted he attack Shi Le, but Wang Jun threatened to execute anyone who disobeyed him. Once he arrived, the gatekeepers allowed Shi Le in, and he flooded the city with cattle and sheep seemingly as offerings to Wang Jun. However, his true intention was to block the streets and alleys for Wang Jun's soldiers. Wang Jun began to panic when he realized what was being done. Shi Le then entered the city, where he let loose his soldiers and sacked the place.

Wang Jun retreated to his chambers but was eventually arrested along with his wife by Shi Le's men. When brought face to face with Shi Le, Wang Jun scolded him and accused him of being treacherous. Shi Le responded by chastising Wang Jun for his disloyalty to the Jin imperial family and ignoring the suffering of his subjects. Shi Le even stated that Wang Jun had abundant food in his granary but refused to distribute it to those affected by natural disasters.

=== Death ===
Shi Le sent Wang Jun to Xiangguo to be executed. On the way, Wang Jun attempted suicide by drowning in a river, but the guards managed to restrain him. Once at Xiangguo, Shi Le ordered Wang Jun beheaded in the marketplace, and Wang Jun reportedly continued to curse Shi Le up to his death. Shi Le gifted Wang Jun's head to the Han emperor, Liu Cong, and also had many of Wang Jun's soldiers and aides killed.

== Hua Fang's epitaph ==
Hua Fang (華芳) was the third wife of Wang Jun who died on 17 April 307 at the age of 36. In July 1965, her tombstone was discovered in Babaoshan Cemetery inscribed with an epitaph written by her husband. The stone which the epitaph is inscribed on measures 130 x 56 cm, and it is the largest excavated inscription from Wang Jun's period so far. Apart from details of Hua Fang, the epitaph also contains information of Wang Jun and his life, casting them in a positive light that contrasts the presentation of him in historical records.
