= Liu Kun (Jin dynasty) =

Jin dynasty general, writer and poet (271-318)

- 劉琨
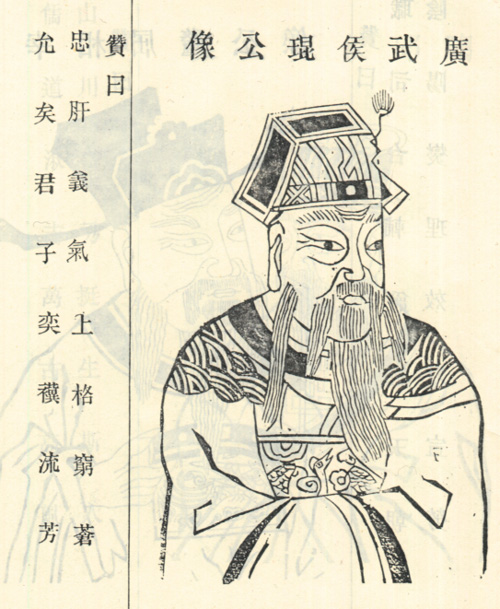

Inspector of Bing Province (幷州刺史)
- In office 306 – 316
- Monarch: Emperor Hui of Jin / Emperor Huai of Jin / Emperor Min of Jin

Personal details
- Born: 271
- Died: 22 June 318
- Spouse(s): Lady Cui (daughter of Cui Can, sister of Lu Zhi's wife and maternal aunt of Wen Jiao) (Note: Liu Qun's biography in Book of Jin recorded that Wen Jiao wrote in memorials that Liu Qun was his yidi, while Cui Yue and Lu Chen were his maternal cousins. The term yidi is ambiguous as it can mean the younger brother or son of one's maternal aunt or one's wife.) (Note: A Wen Shi Pu annotation in A New Account of the Tales of the World recorded that Wen Jiao's father Wen Dan married a daughter of Cui Can.) (Note: Lu Chen's (Lu Zhi's son) biography in Book of Jin recorded that his maternal aunt was Liu Kun's wife, while Cui Yue's biography in the same volume recorded that he was a great-grandson of Cui Lin and a paternal nephew of Liu Kun's wife.)
- Relations: Liu Yu (elder brother; c.265 - c.311); Sima Lun's daughter-in-law (elder sister)
- Children: Liu Zun; Liu Qun
- Parents: Liu Fan (father); Lady Guo (sister of Guo Yi and niece of Guo Huai) (Note: Liu Yu's biography in Book of Jin recorded that both he and Liu Kun were maternal nephews of Guo Yi.) (mother)
- Occupation: Military general, poet
- Courtesy name: Yueshi (越石)
- Posthumous name: Min (愍)
- Peerage: Marquis of Guangwu (廣武侯)

Liu Kun (271 – 22 June 318), courtesy name Yueshi, was a Chinese military general and poet of the Jin dynasty. An esteemed writer during the early years of his career, he was also known for his time as the Inspector of Bing province, during which he spearheaded Jin's efforts in fighting back against the Han-Zhao dynasty. Despite his determination and active role in the war against Han, he lacked the sufficient military and administrative skills to quash the growing Han threat, suffering repeated defeats and having to heavily rely on his alliance with the Tuoba-Xianbei. He was eventually driven out from Bing following a decisive defeat to Shi Le in 316 and fled to You province, where he allied with the chieftain, Duan Pidi. After Pidi suspected him of betrayal, he was arrested and executed via strangulation in 318.

== Early life and career ==
Liu Kun was born in Weichang county, Zhongshan commandery and it was said that he was a descendant of the Han prince, Liu Sheng. Both his father Liu Fan (劉蕃) and grandfather Liu Mai (劉邁) had both served as government officials. Together with his elder brother Liu Yu, Liu Kun achieved celebrity status for his talent in writing whilst working in the Jin capital in Luoyang. The two brothers earned the epithet junlang (儁朗), which meant "outstanding and bright" and were part of Shi Chong's inner circle called the "Twenty-Four Friends of Jingu (二十四友)”, a group of celebrities who were close associates with Empress Jia’s nephew, Jia Mi. Unfortunately, none of Liu Kun's works during his time with the group survived.

== War of the Eight Princes ==
=== Service under Sima Lun and Sima Jiong ===
A civil war broke out in 301 when Emperor Hui of Jin's regent, Sima Lun deposed him and declared himself emperor. Liu Kun’s family sided with Sima Lun against the coalition of Sima Jiong, Sima Ying and Sima Yong, since his elder sister was married to Sima Lun’s heir Sima Fu. (Note: This Sima Fu is not the same person as the brother of Sima Yi.) Liu Kun commanded an army at the Battle of Huangqiao (黃橋, in present-day Wen County, Henan) but he and his allies retreated after being decisively defeated. By the middle of the year, Sima Lun was overthrown and forced to commit suicide while Sima Jiong becomes Emperor Hui’s new regent. Jiong had many of Lun’s partisans executed but he was impressed with the talents possessed by Liu Kun’s family, so he gave them appointments in his new government. After Jiong was killed in battle against Sima Ai in January 303, the Liu family went to serve the Prince of Fanyang, Sima Xiao.

=== Service under Sima Xiao ===
In 305, after Sima Yong had forcibly relocated Emperor Hui from Luoyang to Chang'an, Sima Xiao joined a coalition led by his cousin the Prince of Donghai, Sima Yue, to retrieve the emperor back to Luoyang. Shortly after declaring the coalition, Sima Yue gave out a number of appointments on his own accord, which Liu Kun and his family benefitted from. Liu Fan was appointed Army Protector of Huaibei, Liu Yu was appointed Administrator of Yingchuan while Liu Kun was made a Marshal by Sima Xiao. Meanwhile, the Inspector of Yu province, Liu Qiao, was transferred to Inspector of Ji province, with his old position being given to Sima Xiao.

Although Liu Qiao was a member of the coalition, he became angry at Sima Yue for acting beyond his discretion without the emperor's approval, and he extended his anger to Liu Kun and Liu Yu. As a result, he defected to Sima Yong and sent a letter to his court in which he denounced Liu Kun and Liu Yu for their crimes while stating his intention in attacking Sima Xiao’s base in Xuchang. Due to Xuchang’s poor defences, Liu Qiao easily captured the city along with Liu Kun's parents. Liu Kun tried leading soldiers to save the city but was unable to arrive in time, so he, Liu Yu and Sima Xiao fled north to Ji province.

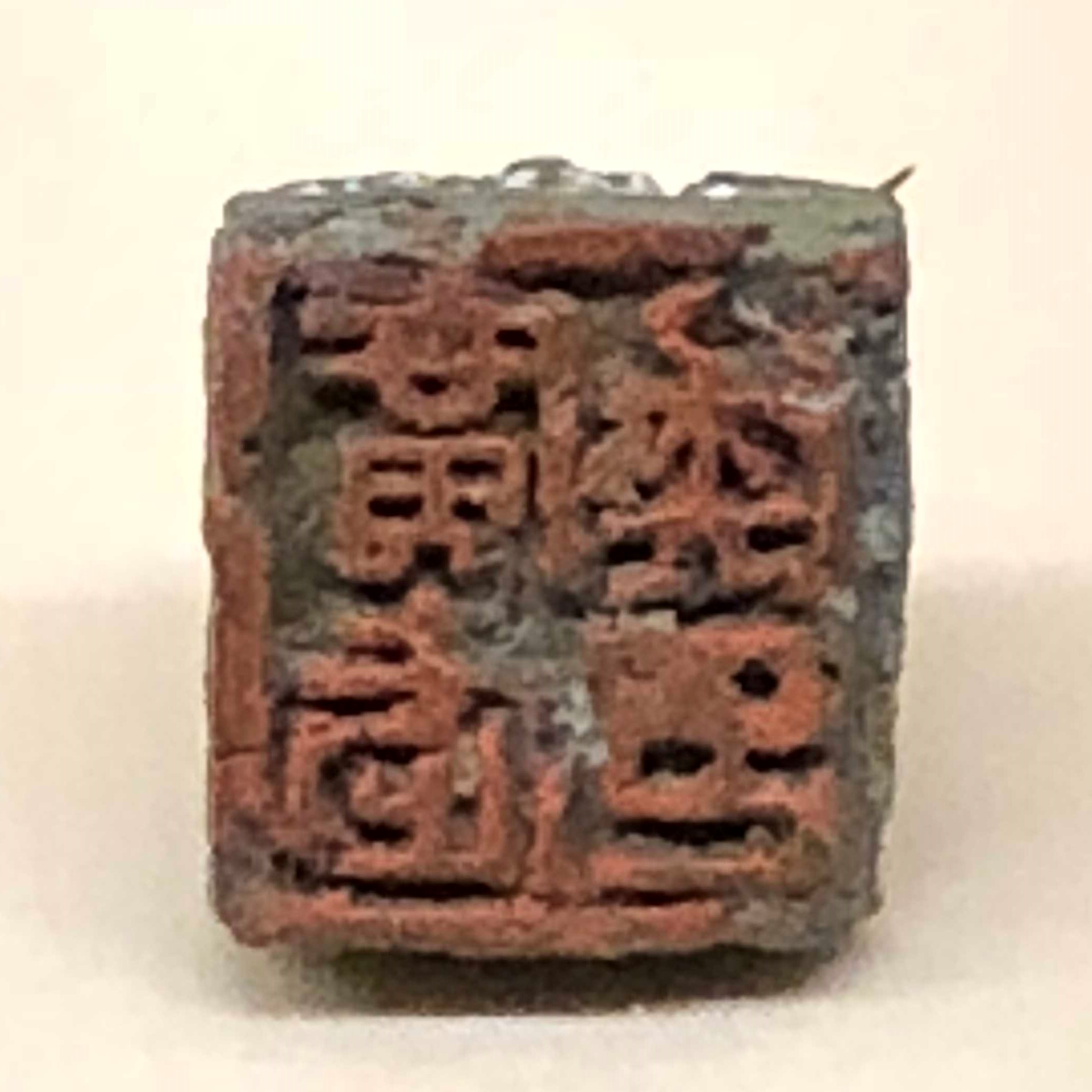
Seal of the Marquis of Guangwu, possibly used by Liu Kun.

At Ji, Liu Kun managed to convince its inspector, Wen Xian (溫羨), who happened to be a relative of his, to give up his post to Sima Xiao. With a province at hand, Liu Kun was sent to You province to request assistance from the commander of the province, Wang Jun. With the help of Wang Jun's Xianbei and Wuhuan "charging cavalries", Liu Kun and Sima Xiao attacked Liu Qiao's forces north of the Yellow River and killed the general, Wang Chan (王闡). They later crossed the river and attacked Xingyang, where they also killed Shi Chao.

As Liu Qiao fell back to Kaocheng (考城, in modern Shangqiu, Henan), Liu Kun and another general, Tian Hui (田徽), routed his ally, Sima Mao at Linqiu (廩丘, in present-day Heze, Shandong). Liu Kun then divided his troops and advanced to Xuchang, whereupon its inhabitants welcomed him without a fight. Finally, Liu Kun marched to Xiao County to link up with Sima Yue, whose army had been blocked from marching into the Guanzhong region by Liu Qiao's son, Liu You (劉祐). Liu Kun defeated and killed Liu You, causing Liu Qiao's army to scatter.

Liu Qiao’s defeat caused Sima Yong to panic, and he tried to sue for peace with Sima Yue. He beheaded his Grand Commander Zhang Fang and delivered the head to Yue, but the offer was rejected. Instead, the head was given to Liu Kun, who used it to convince Lü Lang (呂朗) and Sima Yong’s other generals to surrender. After Sima Yue's forces captured Chang'an, Liu Kun was awarded the title of Marquis of Guangwu.

== Inspector of Bing province ==
=== Restoring Bing province ===
While the War of the Eight Princes was happening, the tribes of the Five Divisions in Bing province, led by Liu Yuan, broke away from Jin and established the Han-Zhao in 304. (Note: Liu Yuan's title at this point was "King of Han" (汉王).) In addition to an ongoing famine, the new Han state brought instability to the province and was becoming a growing threat to Jin. Sima Yue, at the advice of Liu Yu, appointed Liu Kun as the Inspector of Bing to guard the northern borders, replacing Sima Teng.

When Sima Teng left, Han forces and bandits had occupied most of the roads in Bing, forcing Liu Kun to fight his way to his capital in Jinyang (晉陽縣; present-day Jinyuan District, Taiyuan, Shanxi). Liu Yuan sent his general Liu Jing (劉景) to intercept Liu Kun, but Liu Kun defeated him and eventually reached Jinyang. At Jinyang, Liu Kun found that the government buildings were all burnt down and the surrounding towns and countrysides were desolated. Liu Kun managed to restore some order in the province and attracted refugees to his domain.

The following year, Liu Yuan sent Liu Cong, Wang Mi and Shi Le to conquer Huguan county. Liu Kun sent his subordinate Huang Su (黃肅) and Han Shu (韓述) to reinforce the county but Liu Cong killed the two of them in battle while reinforcements sent by Sima Yue were routed by Wang Mi. In the end, his Administrator of Shangdang, Pang Chun (龐淳), surrendered Huguan to Han.

=== Alliance with Tuoba Yilu and conflict with Wang Jun ===
Shortly after this defeat, Liu Kun campaigned against the Tiefu tribe, led by Liu Hu, and the Xianbei Bai tribe (白部) who had sided with Liu Yuan. In 310, (Note: the 3rd year of Liu Yuan's reign as Emperor of Han-Zhao) Liu Kun allied himself with Tuoba Yilu, chieftain of the Tuoba Xianbei, and routed Liu Hu and his allies. Soon after, Liu Kun formed a brotherly bond with Tuoba Yilu. As a reward for his assistance, Liu Kun sent a petition to the court, demanding that Yilu be appointed Grand Chanyu and receive Dai commandery as a fief. The petition was accepted but it also angered Liu Kun’s colleague, Wang Jun, as Dai was under his administration in You province. Wang Jun sent his forces to attack the Tuoba but was unsuccessful.

In 311, Liu Kun discovered that the mother and nephew of Han’s general, Shi Le were wandering in his territory. Liu Kun delivered Lady Wang (王氏) and Shi Hu to Shi Le, along with a letter convincing him to side with Jin. Shi Le rejected his letter but still sent him gifts for returning him his mother.

At the same time, Liu Kun's population was dwindling, as although he attracted refugees to his territory, many of them soon left for safer refuges further north. He had to rely on the Tuoba for their elite cavalry, and knowing his circumstances, the Tuoba pressured him into granting them territory north of Gouzhu Pass (句注, northwest of present-day Dai County, Shanxi). Liu Kun sent his kinsman, Liu Xi (劉希) to gather more followers from Wang Jun's domain, but upon discovering his intrusion, Wang Jun dispatched his forces and killed Liu Xi. Tuoba Yilu sent his son, Tuoba Liuxiu (拓跋六脩) to help Liu Kun against Wang Jun, but Liuxiu entered into a dispute with Liu Kun's officer, Xing Yan (邢延), leading to Xing Yan surrendering Xinxing commandery (新興, in present-day Xinzhou, Shanxi) to Han.

=== Battle of Jinyang ===
In February 312, the Han sent their generals, Jin Chong (靳沖) and Bo Ku (卜珝) to attack Liu Kun and besiege Jinyang, but they were repelled by reinforcements from Tuoba Yilu the following month. Soon after, Liu Kun sent his nephew, Liu Yan to occupy the city of Ye, which had been abandoned a few years prior due to the war. At the time, the Han generals, Zhao Gu and Wang Sang (王桑), were making their way towards the Han capital, Pingyang. Fearing that Liu Yan would intercept them, they feigned surrender to him, so Liu Kun appointed Zhao Gu the Inspector of Yong province and Wang Sang the Inspector of Yu province. When the two generals surrendered back to Han, however, many of their followers rebelled and joined Liu Yan at Ye.

Later that year, Liu Kun assigned the office of Prefect of Jinyang to a man named Xu Run after he won him over with his musical talents. However, Xu Run's administration soon highlighted his cruelty and corruption. The Army Protector, Linghu Sheng (令狐盛) urged Liu Kun to get rid off him but his advice fell on deaf ears. Hearing these complaints, Xu Run slandered Linghu Sheng to the point that Liu Kun decided to execute him.

Liu Kun had planned to campaign against the Han in October or November that year, but after Linghu Sheng's death, his son, Linghu Ni (令狐泥) fled to Han and informed the now emperor Liu Cong of his situation. Liu Cong sent Liu Yao and Liu Can with Linghu Ni as a guide to conquer Bing, and the Han forces managed to oust Liu Kun out of Jinyang while Linghu Ni killed both of his parents. Liu Kun managed to recapture Jinyang with Tuoba Yilu’s assistance but by the time he did, the city had been sacked by Liu Yao. Liu Kun regathered his scattered forces and made way to his new capital in Yangqu.

=== Fall of Bing province ===
In 313, Liu Yan was driven out of Ye by Shi Le's forces led by Shi Hu and fled to Linqiu, so Liu Kun appointed him the Inspector of Yan province. That same year, Liu Kun and Tuoba Yilu poised to attack Xiping commandery, but learning that the Han had promptly set up defence in anticipation of their attack, they soon withdrew.

In spring 314, Liu Kun and Yilu were planning to invade Han again when the former received a letter from Shi Le appearing weak and offering to repent for his crimes by campaigning against Wang Jun. Liu Kun believed the letter and was delighted at first, even going as far as to spread proclamations of Shi Le's submission throughout his domain. However, he soon realized his mistake when Shi Le captured Wang Jun and annexed most of his territory in one fell swoop, cutting him off from the rest of his Jin allies. The victory also prompted many of the tribes in Tuoba Yilu’s domain to defect, forcing Yilu to purge them and undermine his state.

For the next two years, Liu Kun was unable to carry out a major campaign against Han. When Chang'an came under attack from Han later in 314, he sent 500 Xianbei cavalry to reinforce the city. The cavalry were forced to turn back when they found that the roads to Chang'an were all blocked, but on their way back, they managed to assist Jin forces led by Guo Mo and Li Ju at Huaicheng (懷城; in present-day Wuzhi County, Henan) by scaring off Liu Yao's forces.

In April 315, Emperor Min of Jin appointed Liu Kun the Minister of Works and Chief Controller of Bing, You and Ji provinces, but he declined the role of Minister of Works. In September, Liu Yao invaded Shangdang and defeated Liu Kun's forces at Xiangyuan. He was about to attack Yangqu as well before Liu Cong ordered him to withdraw and campaign against Chang'an instead.

In 316, Tuoba Yilu was assassinated by Tuoba Liuxiu, throwing Dai into civil war. Yilu’s generals, Ji Dan (箕澹) and Wei Xiong (衞雄) decided to flee the chaos by joining Liu Kun with thousands of families and livestock. Liu Kun's military strength was thus restored, but a few months later, Shi Le besieged the Administrator of Leping, Han Ju (韓據) at Diancheng (坫城; southwest of present-day Xiyang County, Shanxi). Liu Kun accepted Han Ju’s call for aid and insisted on using his new troops. Ji Dan and Wei Xiong advised against this decision, but he ignored them and ordered Ji Dan with the whole army to attack Shi Le. Shi Le greatly routed Ji Dan, causing him and Wei Xiong to flee back to Dai. Han Ju soon abandoned Diancheng, and with Liu Kun’s army on the brink of destruction, his Chief Clerk, Li Hong (李弘), handed over Bing to Shi Le.

== Final years and death ==
=== Alliance with Duan Pidi ===
After the loss of Bing Province, Liu Kun was left with nothing and nowhere to go. Hearing this, Inspector of You and a head of the Duan tribe, Duan Pidi, sent a letter to Liu Kun inviting him to his headquarters in Jicheng. Liu Kun met him, and the two men started a mutual relationship, arranging a marriage between their relatives. In 317, they swore an oath with each other and sent a joint petition to Sima Rui in Jiankang insisting he claim the imperial title. Liu Kun's envoy was Wen Jiao, whose aunt was married to Liu Kun. The same year, both men planned an attack against Shi Le with Duan Pidi's brothers, but the plan was cancelled as Pidi's brothers refused to take orders from him. The following year, after Sima Rui ascended the throne as Emperor Yuan of Jin, Liu Kun was appointed Palace Attendant and Defender-in-Chief and was presented a famous sword.

=== Accusation of betrayal and death ===
Despite his newfound ally and base, Liu Kun would soon meet his end at the hands of Duan Pidi. Duan Pidi's brother and chieftain of the Duan, Duan Jilujuan died. His cousin Duan Mobo took advantage of his death to usurp the tribe's power. After killing his uncle and cousin's successor, Duan Shefuchen, Mobo attacked Duan Pidi who was travelling to attend the funeral, causing him to retreat. In the assault, Liu Kun's eldest son, Liu Qun (劉群) was captured by Mobo. Mobo treated him with respect and even convinced him to write a letter to his father inviting him over to his side. The letter, however, was intercepted by Duan Pidi's scouts.

Duan Pidi showed the letter to Liu Kun, who at the time had not known of the events that happened. Liu Kun assured Pidi that he would not betray him, even if the letter was indeed from his son. Duan Pidi initially let him off but his younger brother, Duan Shujun (段叔軍), told him: "We are tribesmen, after all, and anyone who can retain the loyalty of the Jin people will fear our own forces. Now there is this strife within our family, splitting apart the flesh and the bones, and Liu Kun must have planned for this day all along. If you allow Liu Kun to rise, it will mean the end of all our clan." Duan Pidi heeded his advice and arrested Liu Kun.

When news of Liu Kun's arrest came out, Kun's son, Liu Zun mounted a defence in his camp but was quickly defeated by Duan Pidi. Two of Liu Kun's generals Pilü Song (辟閭嵩) and Han Ju, also planned to do the same, but their plot was leaked, so Pidi captured and executed them along with their other collaborators. Sima Rui's powerful general in the south, Wang Dun, had always despised Liu Kun. Upon hearing his arrest, Wang secretly sent a messenger to Duan Pidi asking him to kill Liu Kun. On the 22nd of June, while claiming that he had received an imperial edict, Duan Pidi had Liu Kun strangled along with four of his sons and nephews.

=== Aftermath ===
Some of Liu Kun's followers, including Lu Chen and Cui Yue (崔悅), fled to Duan Mobo, where they acclaimed Liu Qun as their leader while others went to serve with Shi Le. Because he killed Liu Kun and broke his oath, Duan Pidi lost the trust of both the Han Chinese and tribal people. Although Sima Rui permitted no one to hold mourning for him to ensure Duan Pidi's allegiance to Jin, both Wen Jiao and Duan Mobo petitioned that Liu Kun be honored posthumously as he had been a loyal Jin subject. Some years later, Liu Kun was posthumously appointed as Grand Commandant and Palace Attendant and given the posthumous name "Min (愍)" or "the Lamented".

== Children ==
Liu Kun had at least two sons, Liu Zun (劉遵, who was a son to his father's concubine) and Liu Qun.

=== Liu Zun ===
When Liu Kun first allied himself with Tuoba Yilu, Liu Zun was sent to Dai to serve as a hostage to ensure Liu Kun's loyalty. He was returned to his father in 316 by Ji Dan and Wei Xiong when they fled to him to escape Dai. After Duan Pidi arrested Liu Kun in 318, Zun mounted a defense in his own camp against Pidi but was swiftly defeated and captured. His final fate is not recorded but it is most likely he was one of the four sons and nephews executed alongside his father.

=== Liu Qun ===
Liu Kun's other son, Liu Qun, courtesy name Gongdu (公度), was described as cautious and good at passing judgement. Prior to his capture by Duan Mobo in 318, he followed his father and fought during his march to Jinyang in 307, helping him secure the provincial capital. After Qun was acclaimed as his father's successor, he remained with the Duan clan for roughly two decades, eventually becoming one of Duan Liao's Chief Clerks of the Left and Right. In 338, amidst the Later Zhao and Former Yan joint campaign on the Duan clan, Liu Qun together with Lu Chen and Cui Yue surrendered to the Zhao forces, and Shi Hu, now ruler of Zhao, appointed Liu Qun the Inspector of Qin province. In 349, Shi Hu's Han Chinese grandson, Shi Min took over the government and installed his uncle Shi Jian as a puppet emperor. Liu Qun appears to have supported Shi Min, as he was made Supervisor of the Left of the Masters of Writing by Min himself. Shi Min eventually formed the state of Ran Wei in 350, changing his name to Ran Min in the process, and Liu Qun became his Deputy Director. Liu was later killed by invading Former Yan forces in May 352.

== Poetry ==
Although Liu Kun only has three surviving poems, he was famous for his works as a poet, his most known being the "Song of Fufeng (扶風歌)". The poem is written during Liu Kun's trip from Luoyang to Jinyang between 306 and 307 and centres around his reluctance in leaving the capital. The poem is unique for its time as it contains elements of poems from the Jian'an and early Cao Wei period. His other two poems are from two letters he exchanged with his wife's nephew, Lu Chen (Note: Lu Chen was also Lu Zhi's eldest son.) between 317 and 318. They are known as "Poem for Lu Chen (贈盧諶詩)" and "Response to Lu Chen (答盧諶詩)". His poems were compiled in a Liang Dynasty catalog as the "Liu Kun Ji (劉琨集)".

== Anecdotes ==
=== "Rising at Cockcrow to Practice the Sword" ===
During his time as Registrar in Si province in the 290s, Liu Kun befriended a colleague named Zu Ti, who would later become one of Western Jin's most famous generals. When they were sleeping in the same bed one night, they heard a rooster's crow at midnight. As this was a bad omen, Zu Ti kicked Liu Kun awake, telling him "This is no evil sound!" The two men got up and performed a sword dance. This event inspired the Chinese chengyu "rising at cockcrow to practice the sword (聞雞起舞; "wén jī qǐ wǔ")".

=== Lifting a siege by playing a flute ===
Another anecdote tells of how Liu Kun drove back an army of hu people by playing the nomad flute. His headquarters in Jinyang was constantly besieged by the hu. In one of these sieges, Liu Kun took advantage of the moonlight to climb a tall building, where he began to whistle cleanly. This caught the attention of the invaders, who went heart-sore and made long sighs because of Liu Kun's whistling. Liu Kun then began playing the nomad flute with his men. The songs that Liu Kun played reminded the barbarians of their homelands and how much they miss it. Towards dawn, Liu Kun played the flute again, this time convincing the invaders to leave and abandon the siege.
