= Zhang Bin (Later Zhao) =

Chinese general born in the 3rd century

- 張賓

Chief Clerk of the Right (右長史)
- In office 312 – 323
- Monarch: Liu Cong/Liu Can/Shi Le

Personal details
- Born: Unknown Neiqiu County, Hebei
- Died: c.February 323
- Parent: Zhang Yao (father)
- Courtesy name: Mengsun (孟孫)
- Peerage: Marquis of Puyang (濮陽侯)
- Posthumous name: Jing (景)

Zhang Bin (died c.February 323), courtesy name Mengsun, formally Marquess Jing of Puyang (濮陽景侯), was a key strategist for Shi Le (Emperor Ming), the founder of China's Later Zhao dynasty.

== Biography ==
Zhang Bin's father Zhang Yao (張瑤) was the Administrator of Zhongshan Commandery during the early Jin dynasty (266–420). Zhang Bin was studious in his youth, and once, comparing himself to the great strategist Zhang Liang, said, "I believe my intelligence and judgment to be no less than Zhang Liang's, but I have not met Gaozu (Liu Bang, the founder of the Han dynasty)." He served on the staff of the Prince of Zhongqiu, but was not trusted, and so he resigned his post.

Later, after various agrarian rebellions started against Jin rule during the late reign of Emperor Hui of Jin, Zhang happened to meet Shi, and believed that Shi was the most capable general he met, and so he joined Shi's army. Initially, Shi did not consider him important, but after they became more acquainted, Shi began to value his advice more and more. In 311, when Shi, who was then a Han-Zhao general who was winning many battles but failing to hold territory, considered capturing the region between the Yangtze River and the Han River, it was Zhang who advised him against the plan, apparently reasoning that Shi's army was suitable for mobility on the plains, not the river- and lake-filled region near the Yangtze. In 312, when Shi's army was facing a food shortage and worried about an attack from the Jin general Sima Rui (later Emperor Yuan), Shi's other main strategist Diao Ying (刁膺) suggested offering to declare loyalty for Jin, which Zhang told Shi would be impossible, given the great enmity that Jin forces had for Shi after his participation in capturing and pillaging Sima Yue's funeral procession and then the capital Luoyang in 311—and that if he tried to retreat, Jin forces would not dare to engage him. Agreeing with Zhang, Shi retreated north without being attacked by Jin forces, and he made Zhang his right secretary—but referred to him as Right Marquess (右侯), a title that he would use to address Zhang for the rest of Zhang's life, in lieu of name, thus showing greater respect for Zhang than for other subordinates.

In summer 312, it was at Zhang's suggestion that Shi finally occupied Xiangguo and held it permanently as his headquarters. For the next few years, while he was ostensibly a Han-Zhao general, with Zhang's assistance he expanded the territory he held to most of the area north of the Yellow River. By 316, Shi had (presumably under authority granted by the Han-Zhao emperor Liu Cong) created Zhang the Marquess of Puyang. In 319, after Shi declared independence from Han-Zhao and its new emperor Liu Yao, thus creating Later Zhao, Zhang served as the prime minister. Zhang died in early 323, and upon his death, Shi mourned him greatly and exclaimed, "Is it that heaven does not wish me to complete great things? Why was the Right Marquess robbed from me?" After Cheng Xia, a capable administrator but not the strategist that Zhang was (and the brother of Shi's concubine Consort Cheng), succeeded Zhang, Shi often sighed, "The Right Marquess abandoned me and let me work with this man. Was it not cruel for him to do so?"
