= Duan Mobo =

Chieftain of the Duan (318–325)

Duan Mobo (段末波) (died 325), also known as Duan Mopei (段末柸) or Duan Mobei (段末杯), was a chieftain of the Duan tribe during the Jin dynasty (266–420) and Sixteen Kingdoms period. Following the death of his cousin, Duan Jilujuan, he forcibly took control over the tribe and fought a civil war against the pro-Jin, Duan Pidi. Duan Mobo maintained ties with Shi Le and the Later Zhao dynasty, who allowed him and his tribe to retain their dominion over the Liaoxi region.

== Life ==
Duan Mobo was a cousin of Duan Jilujuan, the chieftain of the Duan tribe of Liaoxi. He was renowned for being the bravest among his kinsmen and was often entrusted with leading elite troops into battle.

In December 312, the Western Jin Inspector of You province, Wang Jun launched a campaign against the Han-Zhao general, Shi Le at his base in Xiangguo. Duan Jilujuan, who was allied with Wang, responded by leading 50,000 cavalry, bringing with him Duan Mobo as one of his generals. The Duan set camp at Zhuyang (渚陽; in modern-day Xingtai, Hebei) where they built siege weapons to besiege Xiangguo. Meanwhile, Shi Le laid an ambush by building postern gates in the northern part of the city. With the Duan unprepared, Shi's general, Kong Chang carried out a surprise attack on Duan Mobo's canopy. Mobo got the best of Kong and immediately pursued his forces back to Xiangguo, breaking through the ramparts. However, he fell into Shi Le's ambush and was captured alive. The rest of the Duan army were shocked and soon routed by Kong Chang, causing Jilujuan to withdraw back to Zhuyang.

Duan Jilujuan sent envoys to Shi Le offering gifts and three of Duan Mobo's younger brothers as hostages in exchange for peace and the return of his cousin. Shi Le's generals all urged him to kill Mobo, but Shi Le refused, intending to use Mobo as a way to destroy the Duan tribe's alliance with Wang Jun. He then summoned Mobo to a banquet, where they an oath of father and son. Mobo was appointed General Who Pacifies the North and entitled the Duke of Beiping before he was released. With Mobo's return, Duan Jilujuan withdrew his forces from Xiangguo and broke ties with Wang Jun. Mobo was so grateful to Shi Le that on his way back to Liaoxi, he would bow south three times each day. He also reportedly never urinated facing south from then on, and when asked why, he replied, "My father is in the south."

Shi Le eventually defeated Wang Jun, but in 314, a branch of the Duan led by Jilujuan's younger brother, Duan Pidi professed their loyal to the Western Jin and seized the major city of Ji from Shi Le. In 317, Pidi and the exiled Inspector of Bing province, Liu Kun planned to campaign against Shi Le from Gu'an (固安; southwest of present-day Langfang, Hebei) and called upon Duan Jilujuan to join them. However, Shi Le promptly sent his official, Wang Xu to visit Duan Mobo with bribes to sow discord among the Duan. Mobo, seeking to repay his debt to Shi Le, advised Jilujuan that it was shameful to take orders from a younger kinsman like Pidi, who would no doubt claim all the credit if the campaign was a success. As a result, Jilujuan and the rest disbanded their troops, forcing Pidi and Liu Kun to abort their mission.

In 318, Duan Jilujuan died of illness, and because his son was still young, the chieftaincy was passed over to his uncle, Duan Shefuchen instead. Pidi made a journey back to his brother's capital at Lingzhi (令支, in present-day Qian'an, Hebei) to attend his funeral while secretly planning to assassinate Duan Mobo and another prominent uncle, Duan Yulin (段羽鱗) to seize control of the Duan domain. However, one of his aides betrayed him and revealed his plot to Mobo. Mobo relayed the information to Shefuchen, who sent troops to block Pidi when he entered Youbeiping. With his uncle defenseless, Mobo killed Shefuchen along with his children, younger brothers and partisans before declaring himself Chanyu. He then attacked Pidi and nearly wiped out his entourage.

Duan Pidi barely escaped back to Ji, but Liu Kun's eldest son, Liu Qun (劉群) who accompanied him was captured by Mobo's forces. Mobo hoped to win Liu Kun over to his side against Pidi, so he treated Liu Qun with great courtesy and offered to hand over the office of Inspector of You province from Pidi to Liu Kun. He later sent a messenger with a secret letter written by Liu Qun asking Liu Kun to act as an informant within Pidi's camp, but the messenger was intercepted by Pidi en route. The secret letter made Pidi deeply suspicious of Liu Kun, and not long after, he had Liu Kun killed by strangulation. Liu Kun's subordinates, Lu Chen and Cui Yue, brough Liu Qun and the rest of their followers to surrender to Mobo in Liaoxi. Mobo later had Lu Chen and Cui Yue send a petition to Emperor Yuan of Jin at Jiankang to attest Liu Kun's innocence.

Duan Pidi began to lose power and support after his killing of Liu Kun. A few months later, Duan Mobo sent his younger brother with cavalry to attack Duan Pidi, who tried to flee with his soldiers to the Inspector of Ji province, Shao Xu at Yanci (厭次, around present-day Dezhou, Shandong), but was forced back to Ji after suffering a defeat to Shi Le's general, Shi Yue (石越) at Mount Yan. After this victory, Duan Mobo proclaimed himself the Inspector of You province.

In 319, the Inspector of Ping province, Cui Bi formed an alliance with the Duan, Yuwen and Goguryeo to attack the Murong tribe at Jicheng (棘城, in modern Jinzhou, Liaoning). Duan Mopei initially sent his forces to join the Yuwen and Goguryeo to besiege Jicheng, but the chieftain of the Murong, Murong Hui openly sent gifts to the Yuwen camp to drive a wedge between the enemy forces. When the Duan heard about they gifts, they suspected that the Yuwen and Murong were secretly colluding with each other and so withdrew.

In 320, Duan Mobo continued his attacks on Duan Pidi, who by then had abandoned Ji and found asylum under Shao Xu. Mobo defeated his cousin in the initial bout, but soon, with the support of Shao Xu, Pidi counterattacked and badly routed Mobo. Pidi followed up his victory by attempting to reclaim Ji from Shi Le, but Shi responded by attacking Yanci. After a year long siege, Yanci fell, and Shao Xu and Duan Pidi were all captured in 321.

With Duan Pidi's defeat, Duan Mobo became the undisputed chieftain of the Duan tribe at Lingzhi. The Later Zhao court under Shi Le recognized his sovereignty and appointed him the Inspector of You province. The rest of Duan Mobo's reign proved uneventful, except for an incident in 322, when Murong Hui's son, Murong Huang led a raid on Lingzhi and relocated over a thousand families back to his territory. In 325, Duan Mobo died and was succeeded by his younger brother, Duan Ya, who was quickly overthrown by a grandson of Duan Jilujuan, Duan Liao that same year.

Duan Mobo Duan Born: ? Died: 325
Regnal titles
Preceded by Duan Shefuchen	Chieftain of the Duan; 318–325	Succeeded by Duan Ya
