= Shi Le =

Emperor of Later Zhao from 330 to 333

Emperor Ming of Later Zhao 後趙明帝
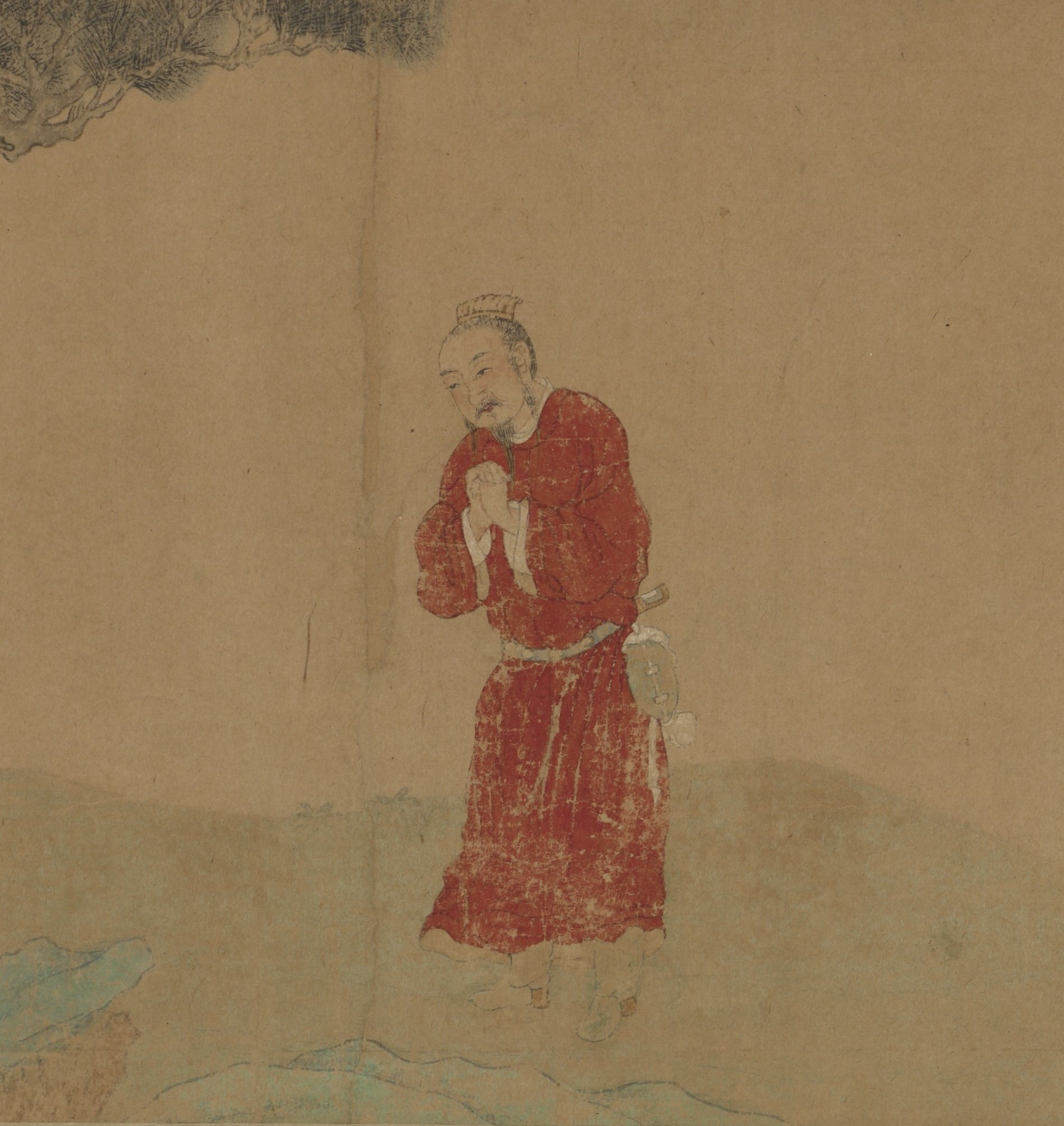
- Ming dynasty depiction of Shi Le from "Shi Le Reverencing a Buddhist Monk" (石勒問道圖), formerly attributed to Qian Xuan.

Emperor of Later Zhao
- Reign: c.March 330 – 333
- Successor: Shi Hong
- Born: 274
- Died: 17 August 333 (aged 59)
- Burial: Gaoping Mausoleum (高平陵)
- Spouse: Empress Liu; Consort Cheng
- Issue: Shi Xing; Shi Daya; Shi Hong; Shi Hui
Names
- Family name: Shí (石); Given name: Lè (勒); Courtesy name: Shìlóng (世龍)
Era dates
- Tàihé (太和): 328–330; Jiànpíng (建平): 330–333
Regnal name
- Grand General, Grand Chanyu, Governor of Ji Province, Prince of Zhao (大將軍 大單于 領冀州牧 趙王, 319–330); Heavenly King of Great Zhao (大趙天王, 330); Emperor (since c.March 330)
Posthumous name
- Emperor Ming (明皇帝)
Temple name
- Gāozǔ (高祖)
- House: Shi
- Dynasty: Later Zhao
- Father: Zhouhezhu
- Mother: Lady Wang

Shi Le (Chinese: 石勒; 274 –17 August 333), courtesy name Shilong, also known by his posthumous name as the Emperor Ming of Later Zhao, was the founding emperor of the Jie-led Later Zhao dynasty of China. He was initially sold as a slave by Western Jin officials, but after attaining freedom, he helped start a rebellion and eventually became a powerful general for the Han-Zhao dynasty, conquering most of northern China in Han-Zhao's name but holding the territory under his own control. In 319, after a dispute with the Han-Zhao emperor Liu Yao, he broke away from Han and formed his own state, Later Zhao (named as such due to Liu Yao changing his state's name from Han to Zhao, which is distinguished as the Former Zhao). In 321, he defeated Duan Pidi, the last remaining Jin power in northern China besides Murong Hui, and in 329 he captured Liu Yao and conquered the Han-Zhao, adding western China to his empire as well. For the next 21 years, the Later Zhao would dominate northern China.

Shi Le is notably the only emperor in Chinese history to have risen from the status of slave. He was known as a brilliant general, but was criticized by historians for excessive cruelty during his campaigns. He also put too much power in the hands of his ambitious and even more ferocious nephew and adopted brother, Shi Hu, who, after Shi Le's death, seized power from his son Shi Daya. Additionally, Shi Le was an important figure in the rise of Buddhism in 4th-century China, as he allowed the Kuchan monk, Fotudeng to wield considerable influence in his court.

== Early life ==
Shi Le was born in 274—but was not named as such, and certainly did not have the family name "Shi", as it appeared that the Jie did not use family names at the time. His likely original name is Bèi (㔨); one other possible original name was Fule (匐勒). His grandfather, named Yeyiyu (耶奕于), and his father, named Zhouhezhu (周曷朱), were minor Jie chiefs, and their tribe traditionally lived in Bing Province (并州, modern Shanxi). Shi grew up in Wuxiang (武鄉, in modern Jinzhong, Shanxi).

In 302 or 303, Bing Province suffered a major famine, and the Jie tribes were seriously affected. Shi Le's tribe spread out and became refugees. Shi and many other Jie and hu people were captured by Jin officials and sold as slaves. Eventually, he was sold to a man named Shi Huan (師懽), but Shi Huan freed him after becoming impressed with his talents. Eventually, he became a leader of bandits, and at one point he befriended Ji Sang, one of Sima Ying the Prince of Chengdu's military commanders. Sima Ying was then stationed at Yecheng and was the most powerful of the Jin imperial princes.

After Sima Ying briefly served as crown prince in 304, he was forced to flee with his brother Emperor Hui to the capital Luoyang and was deposed by Sima Yong the Prince of Hejian. Many of his subordinates, including Ji and Gongsun Fan (公孫藩), deserted, and Gongsun eventually started a rebellion with the stated goal of restoring Sima Ying. Ji and Shi both joined the rebellion—and it was only at that time that Ji gave his friend the family name "Shi" and personal name "Le." After Gongsun was subsequently defeated and killed, Ji became leader of the rebellion and made Shi his key general—now with the goal of avenging Sima Ying, who was forced to commit suicide in late 306. However, their rebellion, while briefly successful in capturing Yecheng in 307 and killing Sima Teng (司馬騰) (Note: Shi Le was sold as a slave during Sima Teng's tenure as Inspector of Bing Province.) the Prince of Xincai, ultimately was defeated in the winter of that year, and Shi instead joined Liu Yuan, an ethnically Xiongnu former Sima Ying subordinate who had by now declared independence from Jin and established his own state Han-Zhao. Liu Yuan made him a general.

== As Han-Zhao general ==
=== As commander of a roving army ===
For the next few years, Shi led his roving band, which he appeared to have largely recruited himself, throughout central China, losing few battles but largely interested in pillaging and not in holding territory. From the beginning, though, Shi showed willingness to accept learned men into his army to serve as advisors and officers, unlike many other agrarian revolt leaders, and he gained many followers, mostly from the Jie and other non-Han ethnicities, but including some Han as well. After Liu Yuan's death in 310, Shi continued to submit to the authority of Liu Yuan's son and successor Liu Cong.

In summer 311, Shi's prestige and power increased greatly when he was able to utterly defeat the largest Jin force remaining in central China. The Jin regent Sima Yue the Prince of Donghai had died in April that year, and the large force that he commanded was trying to escort his funeral train back to his principality of Donghai (roughly modern Linyi, Shandong). Shi Le intercepted them at Ku (苦縣, in modern Zhoukou, Henan), and while the Jin force was much larger than his, Shi's force was mostly cavalry, and it surrounded and disrupted the procession of the Jin force so that it stampeded itself into oblivion. The many Jin princes and officials were captured by Shi, and Shi executed them all. Shi, from that point on, became a feared general.

In July 311, several major Han generals, including Shi, Huyan Yan, Liu Yao, and Wang Mi, converged on the Jin capital Luoyang, which had been left defenseless by Sima Yue. Without major resistance, the capital fell in the Disaster of Yongjia, and Emperor Huai of Jin was captured and later executed in 313. Later that year, Shi captured the powerful Jin general Gou Xi and assassinated fellow Han general Wang, merging their forces with his own. As Shi's army grew, he increasingly trusted his young distant nephew Shi Hu as a general, and under the violent but talented Shi Hu, Shi Le's army became known for its cruel treatment of civilians but was also whipped into shape, rarely losing battles.

In spring 312, though, Shi Le, preparing to have his army cross the Yangtze River to attack Jianye, then under the control of the Jin general Sima Rui the Prince of Langye, encountered difficulties as his army was trapped in the rain. Fearful that Jin forces were going to attack, Shi's key advisor Diao Ying (刁膺) suggested promising to submit to Sima Rui. Another advisor Zhang Bin disagreed, noting that Shi had dealt Jin too much damage previously to be able to submit to them. Instead, he advised Shi to retreat north—noting that Jin forces were so fearful of him that they would not likely attack—and that he should capture a defensible city to serve as headquarters so that he could start to hold and increase his territory. Under Zhang's advice, Shi, later that year, captured Xiangguo and made it his headquarters. He became increasingly reliant on Zhang for advice, and he respected Zhang so much that he no longer referred to him by name.

It was also during this time when Shi Le was introduced to the Kuchan Buddhist monk, Fotudeng, by one of his generals. Fotudeng supposedly impressed Shi Le with his supernatural abilities and predictions, so Shi Le recruited him as one of his advisors.

=== After settlement in Xiangguo ===
In early 313, Wang Jun, the Jin governor of Youzhou (modern Beijing, Tianjin, and northern Hebei), allied with the Xianbei Duan chief Duan Jilujuan (段疾陸眷) the Duke of Liaoxi, made a major assault on Xiangguo, the defense of which had not yet been completed. Shi's general Kong Chang, however, made a surprise attack against Duan forces, capturing Duan Jilujuan's cousin Duan Mobo. Most of Shi's generals wanted to execute Duan Mobo, but instead Shi treated Duan Mobo with courtesy and returned him to Duan forces. The Duan then withdrew and began to disassociate themselves from Wang. Subsequent to this battle, Shi began to use Xiangguo as a base of operations and gradually took increasingly larger pieces of territory under his control—still under Han's name, but acting independently. As it became increasingly clear that Liu Cong, who was talented but violent and wasteful, had become distracted by sensual pleasures and was not able to make Han into an efficient state, Shi began to act even more independently.

In early 314, Shi considered plans to destroy the still powerful Wang. Knowing that Wang long had dreams of becoming an emperor, since he believed that his name was prophesied as one for an emperor, Shi pretended to be ready to submit to him and offered him the imperial throne. Wang, trusting Shi's intentions, no longer defended against him. Several months later, Shi, under the guise of offering tribute, made a surprise attack on Wang's headquarters in Ji (薊, in modern Beijing), capturing and executing Wang. (Note: However, at this time Shi was unable to hold You Province permanently, and it fell into the hand of the Duan chief Duan Pidi, still loyal to Jin.) In fall 315, Liu Cong officially granted Shi imperial authority in the eastern empire, formalizing Shi's hold on his domain.

In early 317, Shi defeated the Jin governor of Bing Province, Liu Kun, who had previously posed a major threat to Han, and took Bing Province under his control, forcing Liu to flee to You Province to join Duan.

In 318, Liu Cong died and was succeeded by his son Liu Can. Shortly after, however, Liu Can was killed by his father-in-law Jin Zhun in a coup, and Jin slaughtered all members of the imperial Liu household in the capital Pingyang (平陽, in modern Linfen, Shanxi). Both Shi and Liu Yao, a cousin of Liu Cong, led their armies against Jin Zhun. Liu Yao declared himself emperor, and Shi decided, at that time, to submit to Liu Yao's authority. Liu Yao created him the Duke of Zhao. Subsequently, Jin Zhun, with his forces under pressure from two sides, was assassinated and succeeded by his cousin Jin Ming (靳明), who abandoned Pingyang and surrendered to Liu Yao. Shi entered the capital but did not occupy it. Shi Le burned palaces in Pingyang. With the capital heavily damaged by the coup and the subsequent battles, Liu Yao moved the capital to Chang'an.

In early 319, Shi sent a delegation to pay tribute to Liu Yao. Liu Yao was very pleased, and made Shi the Prince of Zhao. However, subsequently, Liu Yao became suspicious that Shi was about to rebel, so killed Shi's lead delegate. Shi became angry, and later that year declared independence under the title of Prince of Zhao. (Note: Because Liu Yao, also in 319, changed the formal name of his state from Han to Zhao, Shi's state became known as Later Zhao, while Liu Yao's state became known as Former Zhao.)

== Independence and reign as Prince of Zhao ==
For the first several years of his independence, Shi concentrated on annexing remaining pockets of Jin power in northern and central China. Later in 319, he attacked and defeated Duan Pidi, seizing You Province, and Duan was forced to flee to join Shao Xu the Jin governor of Ji Province (冀州, normally referring to central Hebei, but now only with control of northwestern Shandong). In 320, Shi Le sent Shi Hu and Kong Chang against Shao, capturing him. For a while longer, Duan served as the leader of the Jin forces remaining in Ji Province, but in 321, Shi Hu captured him as well. The only remaining point of Jin power north of the Yellow River became the Xianbei chief Murong Hui the Duke of Liaodong, who claimed Jin vassal status but was acting fairly independently in controlling the modern Liaoning. Shi, however, reached a stalemate to the south with the Jin governor of Yu Province (豫州, modern eastern Henan and northwestern Anhui) Zu Ti, and eventually the sides reached an informal détente with the Yellow River serving as the border, leading to peace and trade relations. After Zu's death in 321, however, Later Zhao forces began to again attack Jin, gradually capturing Jin territory between the Yellow River and the Huai River.

In 322, Zhang Bin died—and Shi lamented at the time that Zhang's death might prevent him from completing greater things. Later that year, Shi Hu attacked and captured Xu Kan, a minor warlord based in Taishan Commandery who vacillated between allegiance to Jin and Later Zhao.

In 323, Shi Hu attacked Cao Ni—a general occupying modern Shandong who vacillated between being a Jin vassal and a Former Zhao vassal but acting independently—capturing him and annexing his domain into Later Zhao control.

In 324, Later Zhao and Former Zhao began actively engaging each other, and for the next several years, they would wage war against each other bitterly, fighting over both their border territory and the parts of territory near the Yellow River still under Jin control. In 325, Shi Hu would defeat the Former Zhao general Liu Yue (劉岳), seizing the entire Luoyang region, which had previously been under split Jin and Former Zhao control, for Later Zhao.

In 328, however, Former Zhao fought back, and forces under Liu Yao's personal command defeated Shi Hu's forces and surrounded Luoyang. Shi Le personally led his force to aid Luoyang, engaging Liu Yao in battle and capturing him. He initially treated Liu Yao with some respect and ordered Liu Yao to order his crown prince Liu Xi to surrender, but when Liu Yao refused, Shi executed him. Liu Xi, in fear of Later Zhao forces, abandoned the Former Zhao capital Chang'an and retreated to Shanggui (上邽, in modern Tianshui, Gansu) with his brother Liu Yin. In fall 328, Liu Yin tried to lead Former Zhao forces to recapture Chang'an, but Shi Hu defeated him, and subsequently marched on Shanggui, capturing it and killing Liu Xi, Liu Yin, and the other Former Zhao nobles, ending Han-Zhao. The former Former Zhao territory became Later Zhao possessions.

== As emperor ==
In 330, Shi Le assumed the title "Heavenly King" (Tian Wang) and made his wife Lady Liu the queen and his son Shi Daya the crown prince; he granted another son, Shi Hong (石宏) the Prince of Qin the title "Grand Chanyu," as official leader of the five nomadic tribes (Note: collectively called in Chinese as Wu Hu) under his rule. This drew secret ire from Shi Hu, who felt that as the general who had contributed the most to Shi Le's campaign successes, he should have been the crown prince or at least Grand Chanyu and was not satisfied with his title as the Prince of Zhongshan. Later that year, Shi assumed the title of emperor and made Princess Liu the empress.

Shi Le, not realizing Shi Hu's intentions, still trusted Shi Hu greatly, despite warnings from his advisors Cheng Xia (Note: the brother of Crown Prince Hong's mother Consort Cheng) and Xu Guang, who advised him to gradually strip Shi Hu's powers and transfer them to Shi Hong. In 332, Shi Le did transfer some of Shi Hu's authority to Shi Hong and the eunuch Yan Zhen (嚴震), but this only served to aggravate Shi Hu.

In 333, Shi Le grew ill, and Shi Hu, during Shi Le's illness, began to put his sons in command of armies, preparing for a coup. When Shi Le died in the fall, Shi Hu immediately seized power in a coup, killing Cheng and Xu. Apparently pursuant to Shi Le's directions, he was secretly buried at a location unknown publicly, and an empty casket was instead buried in a grand ceremony at an imperial tomb. Shi Hu made Shi Hong take the throne, but would depose Shi Hong in 334 and seize the throne himself. Shi Le's descendants would eventually all die at Shi Hu's hands.

== Personal information ==
- Father
  - Zhouhezhu (周曷朱), also named Qiyijia (乞翼加), minor Jie tribal chief.
- Mother
  - Lady Wang.
- Wife
  - Empress Liu (became the Empress in 330, deposed and killed by Shi Hu 333).
- Major Concubines
  - Consort Cheng, sister of Cheng Xia (程遐), mother of Crown Prince Hong.
- Children
  - Shi Xing (石興), the original heir apparent, died sometime before 319
  - Shi Hong (石弘, note the different character from his brother's name), the Crown Prince (330), later emperor
  - Shi Hong (石宏, note the different character from his brother's name), the Prince of Qin (330, executed by Shi Hu 335)
  - Shi Hui (石恢), the Prince of Nanyang (330, executed by Shi Hu 335)

== Notes ==
Emperor Ming of (Later) Zhao House of Shi Born: 274 Died: 333
Regnal titles
| Unknown Last known title holder: Sima Lun as Prince of Zhao | King of Zhao; 319–330 | Succeeded by Himself as Emperor of Later Zhao |
| Preceded by Himself as King of Zhao | Emperor of Later Zhao; 330–333 | Succeeded by Shi Hong |
Titles in pretence
| Preceded by Liu Xi | — TITULAR — Emperor of China; 319–333; Reason for succession failure: Sixteen Kingdoms | Succeeded by Shi Hong |
