= Duan tribe =

4th-century Xianbei tribe of China

The Duan (Chinese: 段; pinyin: Duàn) was a tribe of Xianbei ethnicity during the Sixteen Kingdoms period in China. They were a powerful tribe in the Liaoxi region and played a key role during the fall of the Western Jin dynasty. Unlike the Xianbei tribes of the steppe, the Duan were unique in that they were established within the borders of China. They ruled over their dukedom of Liaoxi and later established the Duan Qi state, although neither were considered part of the Sixteen Kingdoms. The tribe was conquered by the Murong-led Former Yan in 338, but remained politically influential as maternal relatives of the Murong.

== History ==
=== Background ===
The Duan tribe was founded within the Great Wall at Liaoxi Commandery, where the Wuhuan tribes once resided as vassals to the Han dynasty. Following their defeat at the Battle of White Wolf Mountain in 207, the power of the Wuhuan gradually declined as they were scattered and assimilated with the surrounding Han Chinese and Xianbei.

The founder of the Duan tribe was said to be Rilujuan (or Jiulujuan), a Xianbei slave of a Wuhuan family in Yuyang Commandery, the Kunuguan (庫辱官). When a famine broke out in Yuyang, the Kunuguan sent him to Liaoxi to scour for food, but he instead took the opportunity to escape. He gathered a group of exiles and rebels to establish a base at Lingzhi (令支, in present-day Qian'an, Hebei), a city that had been abandoned during the Han dynasty. They adopted the Han Chinese family name of "Duan" (段) as their tribe's name. Rilujuan was succeeded by his younger brother Qizhen, who was then succeeded by his son, Duan Wuwuchen. By the Western Jin dynasty, the tribe had grown to 30,000 families and had around 45,000 cavalry under their wing. The Duan under Wuwuchen were recognized as a vassal by the Jin court.

=== Liaoxi dukedom (303–338) ===
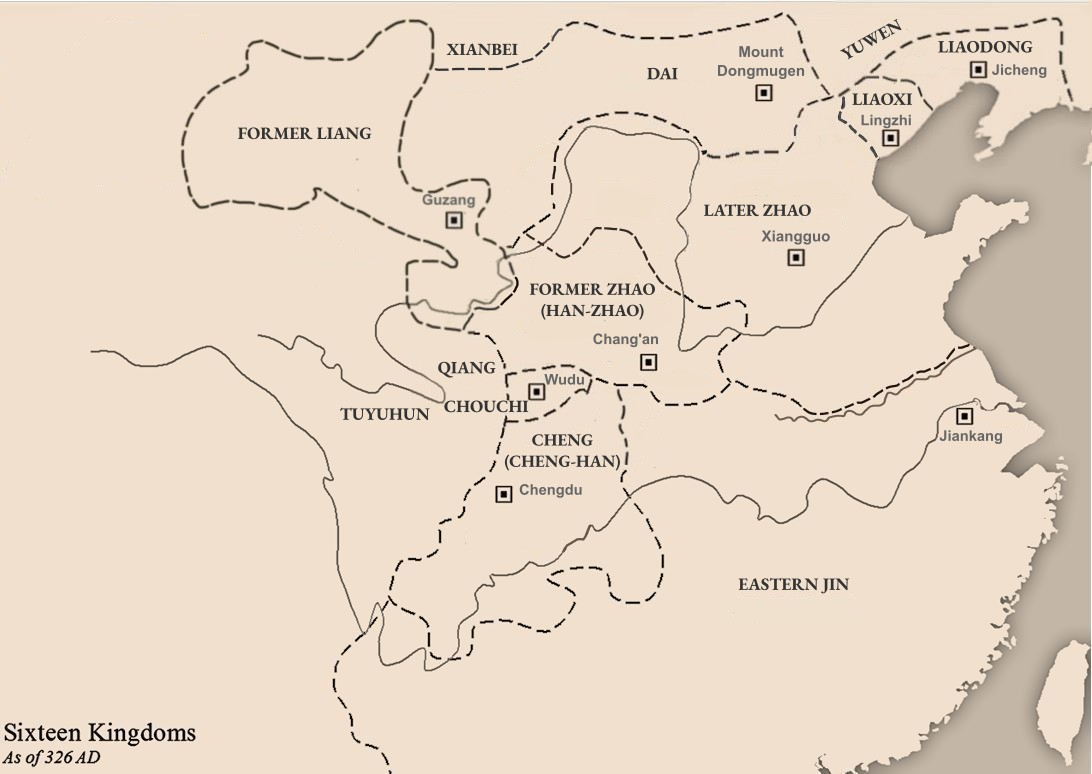
Duan territory in Liaoxi, c. 326.

During the War of the Eight Princes, the Jin Chief Controller of You province, Wang Jun sought to secure his position by allying with the surrounding Xianbei and Wuhuan people. He entered a marriage alliance with Duan Wuwuchen, offering him a fiefdom as the "Duke of Liaoxi" in return for his tribe's military service. Wang Jun's barbarian auxiliaries were a deciding factor in the civil wars, with the Duan playing a role in his victory against the Prince of Chengdu, Sima Ying in 304. The Duan continued to support Wang Jun in his war against the Xiongnu state of Han-Zhao, battling the Jie warlord, Shi Le with much success. Wuwuchen died around 310, and was succeeded by his son, Duan Jilujuan.

In 313, after some negotiations, Jilujuan agreed with Shi Le to break off relations with Wang Jun and withdraw from the conflict. Wang Jun was defeated by Shi Le in 314, but soon after, Jilujuan's brother, Duan Pidi, led a branch of the Duan loyal to Jin and seized control of Wang Jun's old capital in Jicheng. The Duan was effectively split into two, but civil war only broke out following the death of Jilujuan in 318. That year, Jilujuan's cousin, Duan Mobo, seized power from his uncle, Duan Shefuchen, and fought with Pidi over full control of the tribe.

In 321, Pidi was captured and later killed by Shi Le's state of Later Zhao, making Mopei the sole leader of the Duan. At this point, the Duan's state of Liaoxi stretched from Yuyang Commandery to the Liao River. After Mopei died in 325, his brother and successor, Duan Ya was quickly overthrown by his cousin, Duan Liao after he attempted to move the capital. Throughout his reign, Duan Liao fought with the rival Murong-Xianbei tribe in Liaodong, but suffered repeated losses. In 338, the Murong, who by now had established the Former Yan, allied with the Later Zhao to destroy the Duan. Duan Liao was defeated and surrendered to Former Yan, thus ending the Duan's independent state.

=== Later history ===
While Duan Liao was killed for rebelling in 339, the Duan remained a prominent family within the Former Yan and their successors states of Later Yan, Western Yan and Southern Yan as maternal relatives due to a number of their women such as Duan Yuanfei and Duan Jifei marrying into the Murong family. Other Duan members fled to Later Zhao where they became generals, including Duan Lan and Duan Qin. During the collapse of the Later Zhao, Duan Lan's son, Duan Kan, founded the short-lived Duan Qi state in Shandong in 350, while Duan Qin declared himself the Emperor of Zhao in 352; both were eventually captured and executed by the Former Yan. According to the Book of Zhou, Duan Pidi's ancestors changed their family name from Duan to Kudi (庫狄), later sinicized to Di (狄).

== Chieftains of the Duan ==
Name	Duration of reign
Chinese convention: use family name and given name
日陸眷 Rìlùjuàn	Unknown
乞珍 Qǐzhēn	Unknown
段務勿塵 Duàn Wùwùchen	?–310 or 311
段疾陸眷 Duàn Jílùjuàn	310 or 311–318
段涉復辰 Duàn Shèfùchén	318
段匹磾 Duàn Pǐdī	318–321
段末波 Duàn Mòbō	318–325
段牙 Duàn Yá	325
段遼 Duàn Liáo	325 or 326 – 338

== Language ==
Tuan
- Duan
- Native to: China
- Region: Liaoxi
- Ethnicity: Duan
- Extinct: after 356
- Language family: Serbi–Mongolic?: Para-Mongolic?; Tuan

Language codes
- ISO 639-3: None (mis)
- Glottolog: None

Shimunek classifies Duan as a "Serbi" (i.e., para-Mongolic) language. Shimunek's "Serbi" linguistic branch also includes Taghbach, Tuyuhun, and Khitan.

== See also ==
- Xianbei
- List of past Chinese ethnic groups
- Five Barbarians
- Conquest of the Duan
- Duan Qi
