= Youzhou (ancient China) =

Ancient Chinese province

- Chinese: 幽州
- Literal meaning: Secluded Province or Prefecture
Transcriptions
Standard Mandarin
- Hanyu Pinyin: Yōuzhōu
- Wade–Giles: Yu-chou

Map of Chinese provinces in Eastern Han dynasty (23-220 AD)

Youzhou (Chinese: 幽州), You Prefecture or You Province, also known sometimes as Yanzhou (燕州) or Yan Prefecture, was a historical prefecture (zhou) (Note: A prefecture as a political subdivision in Chinese history was at various times either the size of a province or sub-provincial unit known as commandery.) in northern China during the Imperial era.

"You Province" was cited in some ancient sources as one of the nine or twelve original provinces of China around the 22nd century BC, but You Prefecture was used in actual administration from 106 BC to the tenth century. As is standard in Chinese, the same name "Youzhou" was also often used to describe the prefectural seat or provincial capital from which the area was administered.

You was founded in 106 BC as a province-sized prefecture during the Western Han dynasty to administer a large swath of the dynasty's northern frontier that stretched from modern-day Shanxi Province in the west and Shandong Province in the south, through northeastern Hebei Province, southern Liaoning Province and southern Inner Mongolia to Korea. The prefectural capital was the City of Ji in modern Beijing. This prefecture continued to be centered in northern Hebei through the Three Kingdoms and Western Jin dynasty.

In the Sixteen Kingdoms period, several of the kingdoms that ruled northern China used "You" to name commandery-sized prefectures in their domain. When northern China was unified under a single sovereign during the Northern dynasties, You became a commandery-sized prefecture based in modern Beijing. During the Sui dynasty, prefectures were not used as a level of administration, and You was renamed Zhuo Commandery (Zhuojun). You was revived during the Tang dynasty as a smaller, commandery prefecture; its capital Youzhou was within present-day Beijing. In the Five Dynasties period, You was one of Sixteen Prefectures ceded to the Khitans of Manchuria. Thereafter, the name You Prefecture was no longer used.

== History ==
=== Prehistory ===
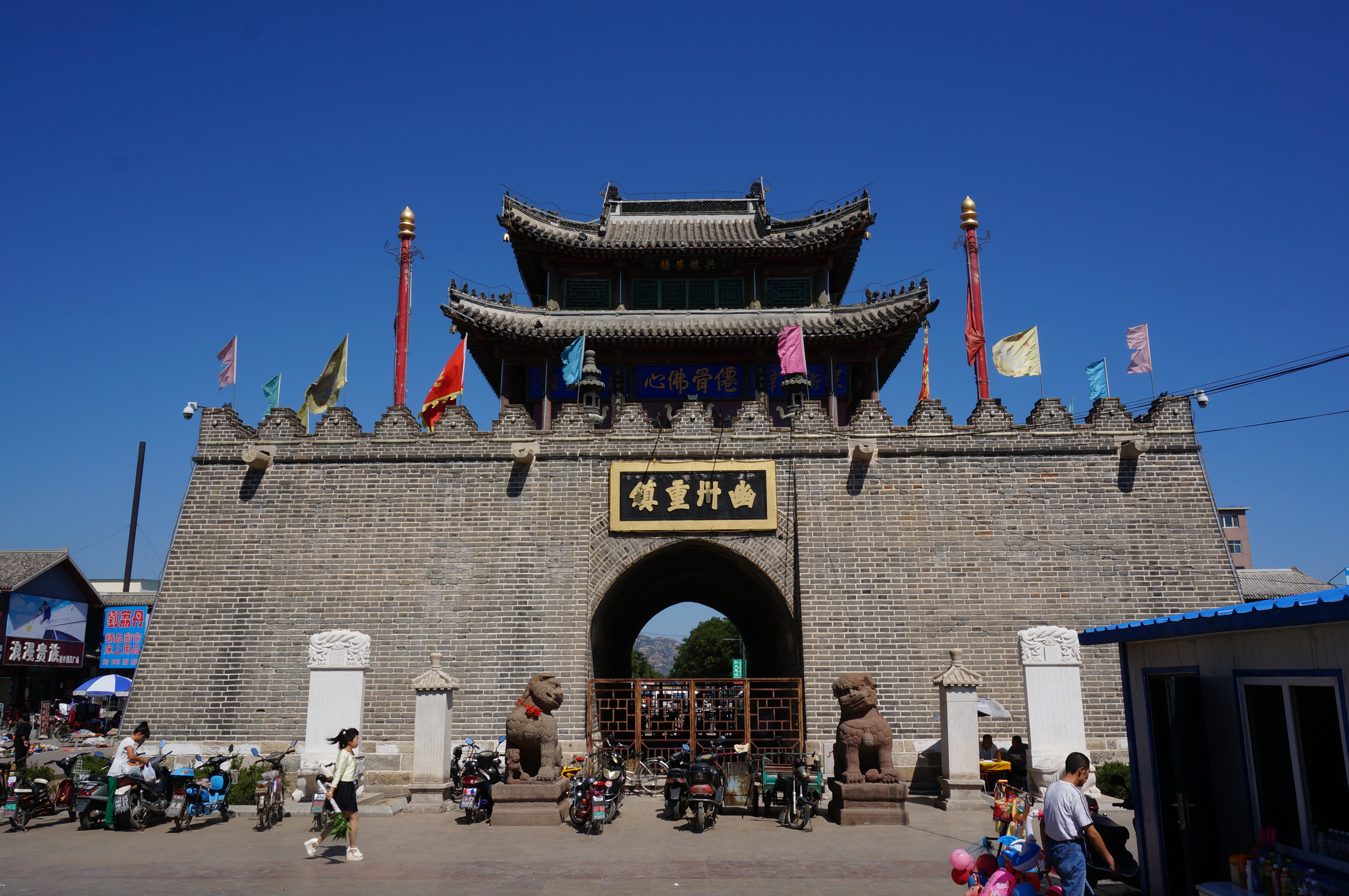
The Drum Tower at Beizhen, Jinzhou, Liaoning, with the inscription "Stronghold of Youzhou". Beizhen was part of You Prefecture during the Han dynasty, when it was the size of a province.

According to several ancient texts from the Warring States period (475–221 BC), You was one of the Nine Provinces of ancient China. Ancient Chinese histories use the Nine Provinces to describe the geographic division of China during the two earliest Chinese dynasties, the Xia (2070–1600 BC) and the Shang (1600–1046 BC). The "Book of Xia" in the Classic of History from the earlier Spring and Autumn period (771–476 BC) states that Yu the Great, founder of the Xia dynasty, divided China into Nine Provinces—Jizhou, Yanzhou, Qingzhou, Xuzhou, Yangzhou, Jingzhou, Yuzhou, Liangzhou and Yongzhou—and does not mention Youzhou as one of the nine. But the Erya from about the third century BC includes Youzhou and Yingzhou instead of Qingzhou and Liangzhou; the Lü's Annals of the Spring and Autumn Annals, compiled in 239 BC, includes Youzhou instead of Liangzhou; and the Rites of Zhou from the middle of the second century BC includes Youzhou and Bingzhou in place of Xuzhou and Liangzhou.

Subsequent texts describe as Youzhou as one of the Twelve Provinces of Ancient China. Sima Qian in the Records of the Grand Historian, written from 109 to 91 BC explains that Shun, sovereign who relinquished power to Yu the Great, felt the domain in north was too vast and created three new prefectures including Youzhou from Yanzhou. The Book of Han, completed in AD 111, also lists Youzhou as one of the Twelve Ancient Provinces.

All of these texts described Youzhou as essentially equivalent to the State of Yan, one of the seven powers of the Warring States era.

=== Han dynasty ===
Youzhou was first instituted as an administrative unit in 106 BC during the Han dynasty. In 106 BC, Emperor Wu of Han organized the Western Han dynasty into 13 province-sized prefectures, each administered by a cishi (刺史) or inspector. You Prefecture comprised the Shanggu, Zhuo, Guangyang, Dai, Bohai, Yuyang, Right Beiping, Liaoxi, Liaodong, Xuantu and Lelang Commanderies. Altogether the eleven commanderies contained 173 counties. The prefectural seat was the City of Ji in Guangyang Commandery, which is part of modern Beijing Municipality. Youzhou was bordered by Bingzhou (present-day eastern and northern Shanxi) in the west, Jizhou (southern Hebei) and Qingzhou (northern Shandong) in the south, Korea in the east and the steppes in the north.

Nomadic peoples on
You's frontier

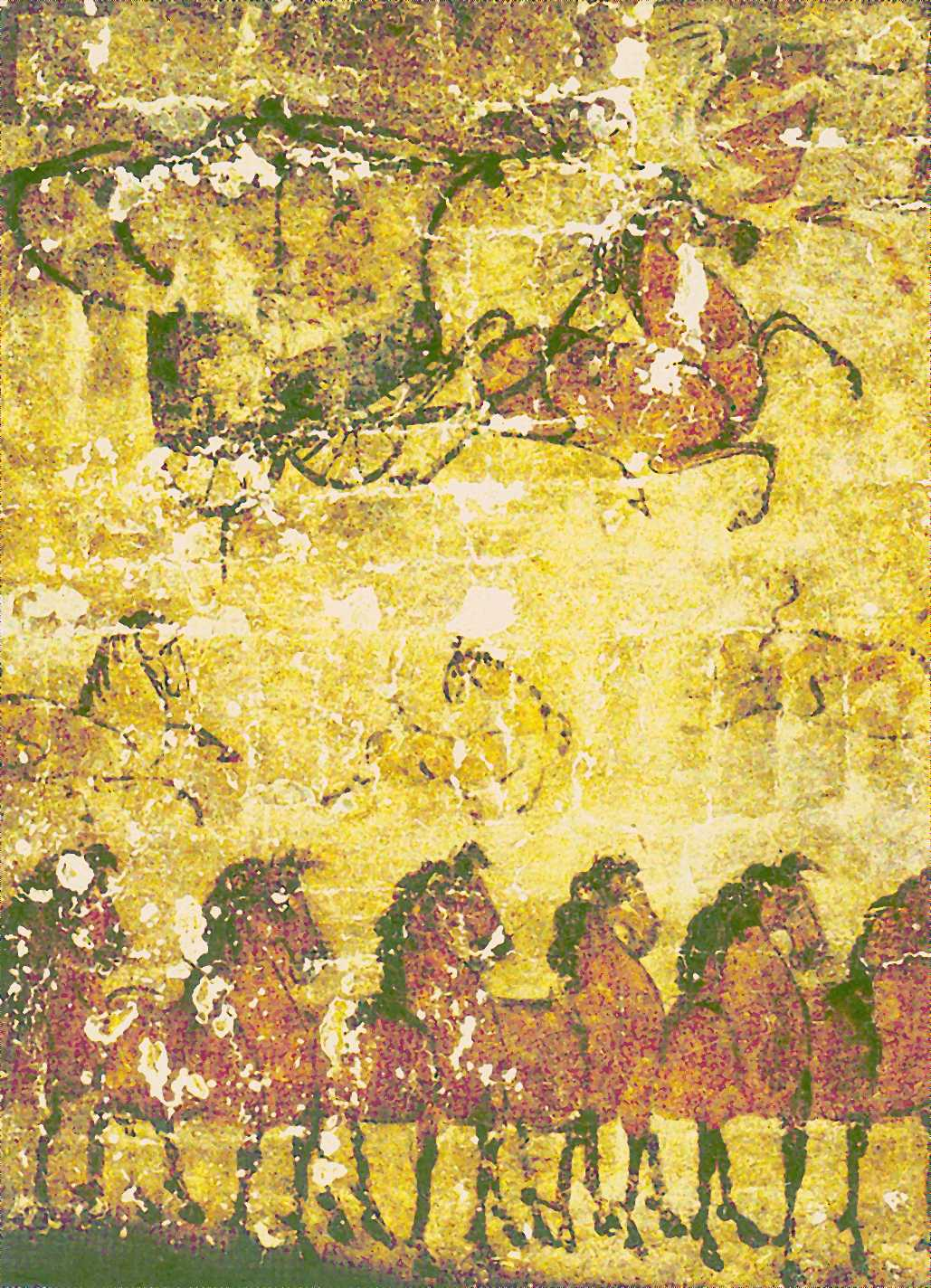
Mural depicting horses and chariots from the tomb of a Wuhuan official and military commander. The Wei Kingdom (220 - 265) of the Three Kingdoms instituted an office in You Prefecture to manage relations with the Wuhuan.

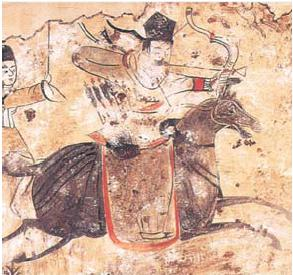
Painting of a Murong Xianbei archer. The Murong Xianbei ruled You Prefecture at the beginning and end of the 4th century through the Former Yan and Later Yan Kingdoms.

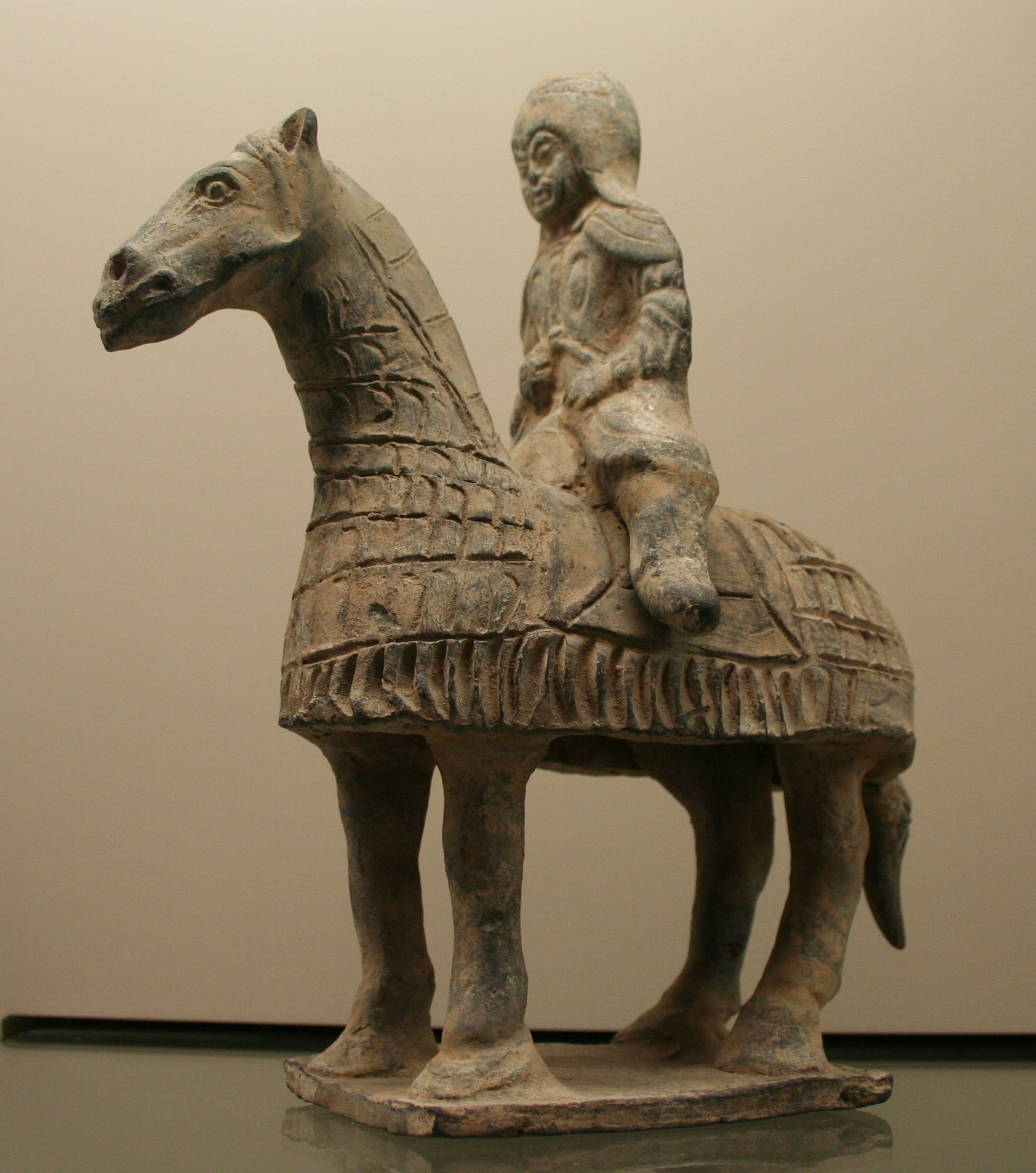
Mounted warrior of the Northern Wei dynasty. The Northern Wei was founded by the Tuoba Xianbei who ruled You Prefecture in the 5th and 6th centuries.

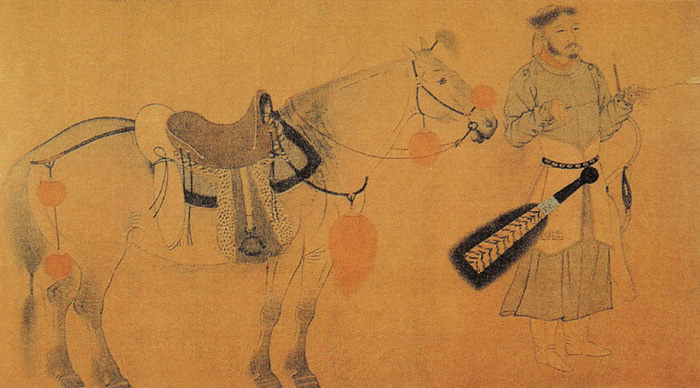
The "Mounted Archer" by Khitan painter Yelü Bei in the collection of the National Palace Museum. The Tang dynasty used You Prefecture as a garrison to protect the northern frontier against the Khitan, who expanded south in the 10th century and incorporated You Prefecture into the southern frontier of the Liao dynasty.

In the Eastern Han dynasty, You Prefecture had ten commanderies—Zhuo, Dai, Shangu, Yuyang, Right Beiping, Liaoxi, Liaoning, Xuantu, Lelang and Guangyang, as well as the Principality of Liaodong. Collectively, You Prefecture had 90 counties. The City of Ji in Yan Principality, continued to serve as prefectural capital.

Toward the end of the Han dynasty, Yellow Turban Rebellion erupted in Hebei in AD 184 and briefly seized You Prefecture's administrative seat at Ji. The court relied on regional militaries to put down the rebellion and You Prefecture was controlled successively by warlords Liu Yu, Gongsun Zan, Yuan Shao, Yuan Xi and Cao Cao. In 192, Liu Yu was overthrown by his subordinate Gongsun Zan. Two years later, Gongsun Zan was driven out of Ji by Yuan Shao with the help of Wuhuan and Xianbei allies from the steppes. After Yuan Shao lost supremacy of North China to Cao Cao in the Battle of Guandu in AD 200, his son Yuan Xi held You Prefecture until 204 before fleeing to the Wuhuan. Cao Cao eventually defeated the Wuhuan in AD 207 and pacified North China.

=== Three Kingdoms ===
During the Three Kingdoms, the Kingdom of Wei founded by Cao Cao's son, controlled ten of the Han dynasty's prefectures including You Prefecture and its capital Ji. Within the jurisdiction of You Prefecture were eleven commanderies, Fanyang, Yan Principality, Beiping, Shanggu, Dai, Liaoxi, Liaodong, Xuantu, Lelang, Changli and Daifang, which collectively ruled 60 counties. In 238, Sima Yi's Liaodong campaign against Gongsun Yuan extended the eastern reach of You to Liaodong. In 244–45, Guanqiu Jian launched the Goguryeo–Wei Wars against Goguryeo from Xuantu Commandery (modern-day Shenyang).

The Wei court instituted offices in You Prefecture to manage relations with the Wuhuan and Xianbei. To help sustain the troops garrisoned in Youzhou, the governor in AD 250 built the Lilingyan, an irrigation system that greatly improved agricultural output in the plains around Ji.

=== Jin dynasty ===
In the Western Jin dynasty (265–316), You Prefecture had seven commanderies and 34 counties. The capital was moved from the City of Ji to Fanyang Commandery in what is today Zhuozhou. The Western Jin expanded the number of counties from 19 in 265 to 31 in 291. Five commanderies and 26 counties in modern Liaoning that used to belong to You Prefecture were carved out to create Pingzhou.

You remained an important prefecture on the northern frontier. In AD 270, the imperial court appointed Wei Guan as the governor of the prefecture. Wei Guan was succeeded by Tang Bin (appointed 282) and Zhang Hua (appointed 291). By the time of the Rebellion of the Eight Princes, You Prefecture was controlled by Wang Jun, who secured alliances with nomadic tribes north of it by arranging marriages of his daughters to tribal chieftains of the Xianbei and Wuhuan.

Wang Jun's support for Emperor Sima Lun against other princes earned the enmity of Sima Ying, who in 304, arranged to appoint He Yan as the governor of You Prefecture and instructed He Yan to eliminate Wang Jun. He Yan then conspired with a Wuhuan chieftain, Shen Deng, to assassinate Wang Jun during a field trip to the Qingquan River just south of Ji. However, during their trip, the travelers encountered a rainstorm and their weapons rusted. Shen Deng believed the rain storm was divine intervention in favor of Wang Jun and disclosed the plot. Wang Jun then killed He Yan and regained control of You. He and his allies Sima Teng, Duan Wuwuchen of the Duan Xianbei clan, and the Wuhuan then attacked Sima Ying in southern Hebei. Sima Ying permitted Liu Yuan, an ethnic Xiongnu commander to leave Ye in southern Hebei and return to Shanxi to mobilize the Xiongnu folk for this war.

Back in Shanxi, Liu Yuan built a multi-ethnic army and broke free from the Jin dynasty. In 308, he declared himself emperor of the Han, a kingdom later named Zhao and known to historians as the Former Zhao. In 316, Liu Yuan's adopted son Liu Yao captured Emperor Min of Jin in Luoyang, ending the Western Jin dynasty. Sima Rui resurrected the dynasty in Jiankang (modern-day Nanjing), known as the Eastern Jin, which continued to rule southern China. Northern China was divided into a series of kingdoms, mostly founded by ethnic minorities.

Wang Jun in Youzhou remained loyal to the Eastern Jin regime in Jiankang and repelled several attacks by one of Liu Yuan's subordinates, Shi Le, an ethnic Jie. Shi Le then used wealth to buy off Wang Jun's ally, Duan Jilujuan and Duan Mobo. This angered Wang Jun, who arranged for the Tuoba Xianbei from the west to attack the Duan Xianbei, but the latter prevailed. In 314, Shi Le pretended to surrender to Wang Jun, who fell for the ruse and lowered his guard. Shi Le then captured and killed Wang Jun, but You Prefecture fell to the control of Duan Pidi, of the Xianbei Duan clan. In 319, Shi Le, founded his own kingdom, the Later Zhao, in Xiangguo (modern day Xingtai, Hebei Province), defeated Duan Pidi and captured You Prefecture.

In 349, the Later Zhao regime was subverted by Ran Min, which founded the Ran Wei regime in southern Hebei. During this turmoil, the Murong clan of the Xianbei from the Liaodong region launched a southern invasion. The Murong clan had founded the Kingdom of Yan (Former Yan) in 337 but remained a vassal of the Eastern Jin dynasty. In 350, Murong Jun, the Prince of Yan, at the suggestion of his half brother Murong Chui, attacked the Later Zhao and Ran Wei in the name of restoring northern China to Jin rule. They quickly captured You. In 352, Murong Jun declared himself emperor and moved the capital from Jicheng (棘城) in modern Liaoning to Jicheng (蓟城) in You Prefecture. Five years later the capital of this kingdom moved south to Ye.

In 370, the Former Yan Kingdom was conquered by the Former Qin Kingdom, led by Fu Jiān an ethnic Di and his general, Wang Meng. They were assisted by Murong Chui, who defected from the Former Yan due to court intrigue. In 383, after the Former Qin was defeated by the Eastern Jin in the Battle of Feishui, Murong Chui founded the Kingdom of Later Yan, which occupied much of the territories of the Former Yan, including You. To the west, the Tuoba Xianbei founded the Kingdom of Northern Wei in 386 and invaded the Northern Yan in 396, capturing Yuyang, Ji and other cities in You Prefecture. By 439, the Northern Wei extinguished the last of the Sixteen Kingdoms and unified northern China.

==== Other Youzhous during the Sixteen Kingdoms ====
During the Sixteen Kingdoms period (304-439), in addition to the You Prefecture in northern Hebei, which was successively controlled by the Later Zhao, Former Yan, Former Qin, Later Zhao and Northern Wei, several other kingdoms in other parts of China also named administrative divisions within their domain "Youzhou". When Liu Yuan ruled the kingdom of Former Zhao, the You Prefecture of Former Zhao was based in present-day Lishi, Shanxi. When Liu Yao ruled the kingdom, the You Prefecture of Later Zhao was moved to present-day Beidi, Yao County, Shaanxi. The You Prefecture of Southern Yan was based in present-day Liaocheng, Shandong, and the You Prefecture of Xia was based in present-day Hanggin Banner of Inner Mongolia. At one time in the fourth century, there were four You Prefectures in northern China, in Northern Yan, Southern Yan, Xia and Northern Wei.

=== Northern dynasties ===
In 497, You was one of about 41 prefectures of the Northern Wei dynasty, which at the time ruled much of north and central China. You Prefecture's territories was largely confined to the southern part of modern-day Beijing Municipality. Its capital remained at Ji.

During the late Northern Wei, many groups rose in rebellion against the dynasty in and around Youzhou. Wang Huiding's rebellion of 494 lasted one month. In 514, Shramana Liu Shaozeng led a Buddhist rebellion in You Prefecture. In 524, Xianbei military families in the Six Frontier Towns rebelled against the Northern Wei and were crushed with the assistance of Rouran chieftain Yujiulü Anagui. The Northern Wei resettled 200,000 residents from the frontier towns to Hebei, where a local famine quickly prompted the migrants to rebel again under the leadership of Du Luozhou in 525. Du Luozhou led the rebels from Shanggu (modern-day Huailai) south through the Juyong Pass and defeated Wei troops north of Youzhou and eventually captured the city. In 528 Wei troops under Erzhu Rong's subordinate, Hou Yuan, retook the city from rebel leader Han Lou.

In 534, the Northern Wei split in half along the Yellow River into the Western Wei and Eastern Wei, which controlled You Prefecture. The Eastern Wei continued for 16 years before it was replaced by the Northern Qi. Though Northern Qi held only half the territory of the Northern Wei, it had 105 prefectures.

=== Sui and Tang dynasty ===
Zhuo Commandery
- Chinese: 涿郡
Transcriptions
Standard Mandarin
- Hanyu Pinyin: Zhuōjùn
- Wade–Giles: Cho-chün

The Sui dynasty united China in 589 and did not use prefecture as a unit of administration. All prefectures were converted to commanderies. You Prefecture was renamed Zhuo Commandery or Zhuojun, one of 190 commanderies in Sui China.

The Tang dynasty re-adopted the prefecture but used it as replacement for commandery. Zhuojun reverted to You, which in 640 was one of 360 prefectures of the dynasty. The capital of You Prefecture remained in Ji. The Tang also instituted 10 frontier command garrisons called jiedushi. The Fanyang Jiedushi was based in Ji and became one of the "three revolting garrisons of Hebei" after the Anshi Rebellion. After the war, the Lulong Jiedushi retained semi-independence from Tang.

=== Five Dynasties and Ten Kingdoms period to Liao dynasty ===
In the Five Dynasties and Ten Kingdoms period (907–960), the warlord Liu Rengong established his base in Youzhou and declared himself "King of Yan" (燕王). His regime was ultimately toppled by the Later Tang (923–936). Shi Jingtang, founder of the Later Jin (936–947), submitted to the Khitans of the Liao dynasty (907–1125) and ceded the Sixteen Prefectures (You was one of the sixteen) to them. In 938 the Khitans established a secondary capital in You Prefecture and named it Nanjing Youdu Prefecture (南京幽都府). In 1012 it was renamed Xijin Prefecture (析津府) and later renamed to Yanjing (燕京). The name "Youzhou" was never used again.

== See also ==
- Yan State
- History of Beijing
- Jicheng (Beijing)
