= 349 =

349 in various calendars
- Gregorian calendar: 349; CCCXLIX
- Ab urbe condita: 1102
- Assyrian calendar: 5099
- Balinese saka calendar: 270–271
- Bengali calendar: −245 – −244
- Berber calendar: 1299
- Buddhist calendar: 893
- Burmese calendar: −289
- Byzantine calendar: 5857–5858
- Chinese calendar: 戊申年 (Earth Monkey); 3046 or 2839 — to — 己酉年 (Earth Rooster); 3047 or 2840
- Coptic calendar: 65–66
- Discordian calendar: 1515
- Ethiopian calendar: 341–342
- Hebrew calendar: 4109–4110
- Hindu calendars
- Vikram Samvat: 405–406
- Shaka Samvat: 270–271
- Kali Yuga: 3449–3450
- Holocene calendar: 10349
- Iranian calendar: 273 BP – 272 BP
- Islamic calendar: 281 BH – 280 BH
- Javanese calendar: 230–232
- Julian calendar: 349; CCCXLIX
- Korean calendar: 2682
- Minguo calendar: 1563 before ROC 民前1563年
- Nanakshahi calendar: −1119
- Seleucid era: 660/661 AG
- Thai solar calendar: 891–892
- Tibetan calendar: ས་ཕོ་སྤྲེ་ལོ་ (male Earth-Monkey); 475 or 94 or −678 — to — ས་མོ་བྱ་ལོ་ (female Earth-Bird); 476 or 95 or −677

Year 349 (CCCXLIX) was a common year starting on Sunday of the Julian calendar. At the time, it was known as the Year of the Consulship of Limenius and Catullinus (or, less frequently, year 1102 Ab urbe condita). The denomination 349 for this year has been used since the early medieval period, when the Anno Domini calendar era became the prevalent method in Europe for naming years.

== Events ==
=== By place ===
==== Asia ====
- Shi Hu, emperor of the Jie state Later Zhao since 334, dies. The state plunges into turmoil with his sons Shi Shi, Shi Zun, Shi Jian and Shi Zhi plotting against each other and holding the emperorship in rapid succession, before ethnic Han Ran Min establishes the short-lived Ran Wei dynasty in 350, bringing the Later Zhao dynasty to an end in 351 before it is itself conquered and divided by the Former Yan and Former Qin dynasties in 351.
- Shi Shi, youngest of Shi Hui's sons, reigns for 33 days before being deposed and executed at age 10 by Shi Zun. After a brief reign of 183 days, Emperor Shi Zun and his mother Empress Zheng Yingtao are executed; his brother Shi Jian succeeds him, only to be toppled after 103 days in early 350 by Shi Zhi,

== Births ==
- John Chrysostom, archbishop of Constantinople (approximate date)

== Deaths ==
- Empress Liu, wife of Emperor Shi Hu (b. 318)
- Shi Hu, emperor of the Jie state Later Zhao (b. 295)
- Shi Shi, emperor and brother of Shi Zun (b. 339)
- Shi Zun, emperor of the Jie state Later Zhao
- Wei Shuo, calligrapher of the Jin Dynasty (b. 272)
- Empress Zhang, wife of emperor Shi Zun
- Empress Zheng Yingtao, mother of emperor Shi Zun
