= Taining =

Taining may refer to:

== Places ==
- Taining County, a county in Fujian, China

== Historical eras ==
- Taining (太寧, 323–326), era name used by Emperor Ming of Jin
- Taining (太寧, 349), era name used by Later Zhao emperors Shi Hu, Shi Shi, Shi Zun and (briefly) Shi Jian
- Taining (太寧, 561–562), era name used by Emperor Wucheng of Northern Qi

== People ==
- Cheng Taining Chinese architect
