= Zhang Chai =

Later Zhao minister and regent

- 張豺

General Who Awes the Rong (戎昭將軍)
- In office ? – 349
- Monarch: Shi Hu

Grand Guardian (太保)
- In office 349 – 349
- Monarch: Shi Shi

Personal details
- Born: Unknown Guangping County, Hebei
- Died: 16 June 349
- Relations: Zhang Xiong (brother)

Zhang Chai was a minister and regent of China's Later Zhao dynasty during the Sixteen Kingdoms period. He was a close ally to Shi Hu (Emperor Wu)'s empress, Empress Liu, who helped her establish themselves as the paramount leaders of Zhao through her son Shi Shi following the death of Shi Hu in 349. The pair attempted to centralize their power and eliminate their rivals, but a popular coup led by Shi Zun saw their reign barely lasting a month as they were removed and subsequently executed. Despite the coup, it would soon be known as the beginning of a bigger power struggle within the Shi family over the throne that led to the destruction of Later Zhao in 351 in the hands of Ran Min.

== Early life and career ==
Zhang Chai was a man from Guangping County in Julu Commandery. In 312, Zhang Chai and a fellow townsman named You Lun (游綸) gathered a large host of people and staged a revolt in the city of Yuanxiang (苑鄕, in present-day Hebei and Beijing), which was at the time under Han-Zhao. Zhang Chai and You Lun surrendered to the Youzhou warlord and Jin general Wang Jun and in response, the Han general Shi Le sent his army to besiege Yuanxiang. Wang Jun directed his army to attack Shi Le's capital in Xiangguo, forcing Shi Le to take his focus away from Yuanxiang. However, Shi Le managed to turn back Wang Jun's army, so Zhang Chai and You Lun surrendered back to Han that same year.

Shi Le broke away from Han-Zhao in 319 and established his own state of Later Zhao. Zhang Chai appears to have followed Shi Le during the split. In 329, he participated in Shi Hu's campaign against Liu Yin and Liu Xi in Shanggui. The campaign was a victory for Shi Hu and resulted in the complete destruction of Han-Zhao. During the campaign, Zhang Chai captured the Han-Zhao emperor Liu Yao's daughter, the Princess of Anding, who was only twelve years old at the time. Zhang introduced her to Shi Hu, who made her one of his concubines and eventually grew to be one of Shi Hu's favourite wives. She had a son with Shi Hu, who they named Shi Shi.

== Supporting Shi Shi to the throne ==
In 348, Shi Hu was troubled with a succession issue. He had just executed his heir, Shi Xuan (石宣), who plotted to assassinate him before he was discovered. At the suggestion of Zhang Ju, Shi Hu considered making either Shi Bin (石斌) or Shi Zun as his new heir. Zhang Chai, who was serving as the General Who Awes the Rong at the time, proposed against it, stating, "The Duke of Yan (Shi Bin) had a lowborn mother, and he has already committed a transgression. The Duke of Pengcheng’s (Shi Zun) mother (Zheng Yingtao) had been demoted before due to the incident with your original Crown Prince (Shi Sui (石邃), who was also executed by Shi Hu). If she becomes Empress again, I fear she might still hold a grudge. I pray Your Majesty reconsider."

Under the guise of concern, Zhang Chai actually wanted Shi Shi installed because he was still a child. Zhang Chai was confident that Shi Hu was about to die soon, and supporting Shi Shi would greatly increase his personal power. He further adds, "When Your Majesty chose your heirs before, their mothers were all of common blood, and that was why disasters happened one after another. So this time, you should choose as your crown prince a son who is both filial and born of noble blood." Shi Hu agreed and made Shi Shi his Crown Prince and Lady Liu as his Empress. When a petition was published to have the ministers support Shi Shi to the throne, one minister, Cao Mo (曹莫), refused to sign the petition. When Shi Hu sent Zhang Chai to ask why, he expressed his belief that it was not proper to have a child be emperor.

The following year in 349, Zhang Chai's instincts proved to be correct, as Shi Hu became deathly ill. Shi Hu started appointing regents to guide Shi Shi, them being Shi Bin, Shi Zun and Zhang Chai. Zhang Chai was appointed Grand General Who Guards And Protects, General Who Leads The Army, and Supervisor of the Masters of Writing. Both Zhang and Empress Liu saw Shi Bin as a potential rival for them once Shi Hu dies. They sent a messenger to Shi Bin falsely informing him to enjoy himself in Xianngguo, stating that Shi Hu was now recovering from his illness. Once Shi Bin started participating in excessively indulgent activities, Empress Liu and Zhang Chai forged an edict denouncing him as an unfilial son and had him confined in his home, where Zhang had his brother Zhang Xiong (張雄) watch the prince with his soldiers. Zhang Chai later sent a false edict to his brother telling him to kill Shi Bin.

Another false edict was forged by the Empress, this time solidifying Zhang Chai's power over the court. The Empress made Zhang Chai Grand Guardian and Commander of all military affairs, and chief of affairs of the Masters of Writing. He was to hold so much power that it was comparable to that of Huo Guang during the Han dynasty.

== Brief control over the government ==
Shi Hu died on 26 May 349 and Empress Dowager Liu took control of affairs, making Zhang Chai the Prime Minister. However, Zhang Chai objected and instead suggested that Shi Zun and the Prince of Yiyang, Shi Jian be made Prime Ministers of the Left and Right respectively to appease them, which she agreed.

One of Zhang Chai's first goal was to eliminate the Minister of Works, Li Nong. He planned to execute him but one of the conspirators, Zhang Ju was a friend of Li Nong, so he leaked the plot to him, giving Li ample time to flee to Guangzong. Li Nong then fled to Shangbai (上白, in modern-day Guangzong County, Hebei) where he defended himself with soldiers from the Qihuo, so the Empress Dowager ordered Zhang Ju to besiege Li Nong with capital troops. Meanwhile, Zhang Chai appointed Zhang Li (張離) as Grand General Who Guards The Army and Chief of all military affairs to act as his adjutant.

Shi Hu's generals and ministers all despised Zhang Chai and the Empress Dowager for their grasp over the court, and the attack on Li Nong only assured their resentment. A group of powerful generals, including Pu Hong, Yao Yizhong and Shi Min, were returning from quelling Liang Du's rebellion in the west when they came across Shi Zun on their way back home. They convinced him to lead them in deposing Shi Shi, the Empress Dowager and Zhang Chai in exchange that they support him in becoming the new emperor. Shi Zun agreed and raised he troops in Licheng (李城, in modern-day Pingyi County, Shandong) to march over to Yecheng. He then sent out a proclamation calling out Zhang Chai's crimes, sending Zhang Chai into panic and causing him to recall the troops from Shangbai.

Shi Zun and his army reached Tangyin on June 12 with Shi Min serving the vanguard. Zhang Chai intended to march out and face him, but many of his troops defected in support of the prince as they thought he had come to mourn his late father. Zhang Chai tried to kill as many defectors that he can but most of them escaped to the opposing side. Even his adjutant Zhang Li decided to defect and opened the gates for Shi Zun to enter. The Empress Dowager was distressed and urged Zhang to grant him high-ranking offices. An edict was made appointing Shi Zun as Prime Minister along with many other offices, but he continued his advance into Ye.

Shi Zun reached Anyang Point on June 15, and Zhang Chai fearfully went out to welcome him but was arrested by Shi Zun instead. On June 16, Shi Zun reached the palace and carried out the mourning ceremony. Zhang Chai was executed at the Pingle (平樂) market square in Ye along with his family members to the third degree. After Shi Zun ascended the throne, Shi Shi and the now-deposed Lady Liu were also executed. Despite their removal, Later Zhao was thrown into civil war between Shi Zun and his brothers who supposedly sought to avenge Shi Shi, and Shi Zun himself would only rule for 183 days before he was removed by Shi Min, starting Later Zhao's swift decline.
