= Empress Zhang (Later Zhao) =

Chinese Empress (Later Zhao)

Empress Zhang (Chinese: 張皇后, personal name unknown) (died 349) was briefly an empress of the Chinese/Jie state Later Zhao. She was Shi Zun's wife and the last empress in Later Zhao history.

After Shi Zun, a son of the emperor Shi Hu, took over the throne in 349 after overthrowing his younger brother Shi Shi, he made her empress. He reigned for only 183 days before he was overthrown in a coup by his brother Shi Jian and his adoptive nephew Shi Min. Soon thereafter, both Empress Zhang and her husband were executed by Shi Min.

Chinese royalty
Preceded by Empress Liu	Empress of Later Zhao; 349	Succeeded by None (dynasty destroyed)
Preceded by Empress Liu	Empress of China (Northern/Central); 349	Succeeded by Empress Dong of Ran Wei
Preceded by Empress Liu	Empress of China (Western); 349	Succeeded by Empress Qiang of Former Qin
