= Yao Yizhong =

Later Zhao general and Qiang chieftain (280-352)

- 姚弋仲

Grand Chanyu (大單于)
- In office 351 – 352
- Monarch: Emperor Mu of Jin

Grand Commander of the Western Qiang (西羌大都督)
- In office 333 – 351
- Monarch: Shi Hong/Shi Hu/Shi Shi/Shi Zun/Shi Jian/Shi Zhi

Prime Minister of the Right (右丞相)
- In office 351 – 351
- Monarch: Shi Zhi

Personal details
- Born: 280
- Died: 352
- Children: Yao Yi; Yao Ruo; Yao Xiang; Yao Chang; Yao Xu; Yao Yinmai; Yao Shuode; Yao Shao; Yao Jing; Yao Huang; 32 unnamed sons
- Parent: Yao Kehui (father)
- Posthumous name: Emperor Jingyuan (景元皇帝)
- Temple name: Shizu (始祖)

Yao Yizhong (280 – April 352), posthumously honored as Emperor Jingyuan, was a Qiang military general of the Later Zhao dynasty during the Sixteen Kingdoms period. Starting out as a refugee leader during the Disaster of Yongjia, Yizhong later submitted to Later Zhao in 329, where he became a favorite general of the state's third ruler, Shi Hu. As Zhao collapsed in 350, he sided with Shi Zhi against the Ran Wei breakaway state, becoming one of Shi Zhi's top commanders, but ultimately could not prevent the state’s demise. After his death in 352, his fifth son Yao Xiang led his family to join the Jin dynasty (266–420) before becoming a roving warlord in the Central Plains. Yizhong's twenty-fourth son, Yao Chang, would go on to establish the Later Qin dynasty and posthumously honor him as an emperor in 384.

== Background and early career ==
Yao Yizhong was a Qiang chieftain from Chiting county, Nan'an commandery (赤亭, 南安郡; southeast of present-day Longxi County, Gansu). His family claimed descent from Yu the Great and the Shaodang Qiang. His ancestor, Dianwu harassed the western regions during the time of Emperor Guangwu of Han's reign between 57 and 58 AD. Yizhong's great-great-great-grandfather was Qianna (遷那), who submitted to Han and moved to Chiting. During the Conquest of Shu Han by Cao Wei, Yizhong's father Yao Kehui (姚柯回) assisted the Wei army in confining Jiang Wei's forces, and for his merits, he was appointed as the General Who Conquers The West, Colonel Who Organizes The Rong and Protector of the Western Qiang.

Yao Yizhong was characterised as dutiful and well-respected all around in his youth. In 312, a year after the Disaster of Yongjia, Yao Yizhong moved to Yumei (榆眉; east of present-day Qianyang County, Shaanxi) and set his base, where he opened himself to provide shelter to refugees from the east. He attracted thousands of both tribal and Han refugees wishing to escape the chaos. Soon, he proclaimed himself as the Duke of Fufeng, Inspector of Yongzhou and Colonel Who Protects the Qiang. After the emperor of Han-Zhao, Liu Yao defeated the rebel Chen An in 323, Liu Yao formally appointed him as General Who Pacifies the West and Duke of Pingxiang.

== Service under Shi Le ==
After Han-Zhao was conquered by its rival state, Later Zhao, Yizhong submitted to the Later Zhao general Shi Hu. Yizhong advised Shi Hu to relocate the strong and influential families of Longshang (隴上; north of present-day Shaanxi and west of present-day Gansu) to the region surrounding their capital, Xiangguo. This, according to Yizhong, would keep the families in check while also strengthening the capital. Shi Hu considered his suggestion and persuaded his uncle, Zhao's ruler, Shi Le, to award Yizhong with the offices of General Who Maintains The West and Commander of the Left of the Six Tribes.

In 330, the Jin rebel Zu Yue involved in Su Jun's rebellion fled to Later Zhao, seeking their protection. Shi Le entertained him initially but deep down he was not fond of Zu Yue, and even his close advisor Cheng Xia urged him to execute him and his family, believing that they could not be trusted. Yao Yizhong supported Cheng Xia's idea, sending Shi Le a memorial that states, "Zu Yue was a rebellious thief in Jin who drove the Empress Dowager to death and was not loyal to his lord. Yet, Your Majesty continues to spoil him, and your ministers fear this will sprout into chaos. This is just the beginning." Shi Le took their advices and executed Zu Yue along with his family.

== Service under Shi Hong and Shi Hu ==
Shi Le died in 333, leaving the throne to his son Shi Hong. However, not long after Shi Le's death, Shi Hu seized the government in a coup and made Shi Hong a puppet emperor. Shi Hu acted out Yizhong's advice of moving the powerful families of Longshang to the capital region and appointed him Grand Commander of the Western Qiang. He and his family were relocated to Shetou (灄頭; northeast of present-day Zaoqiang County, Hebei), Qinghe Commandery where he was tasked with supervising the Qiang tribes.

The following year, Shi Hu killed Shi Hong and declared himself "Regent Heavenly King". Yizhong was not pleased with what had happened, so he feigned illness to avoid needing to congratulate Shi Hu. He was eventually forced to in the end, and when the two finally met, Yizhong sternly criticised him for what he had done to Shi Hong. Shi Hu defended himself by saying that Shi Hong was too young for a ruler and would not be able to handle affairs. Yizhong was not satisfied with Shi Hu's answer, but at the same time, Shi Hu did not dare to punish Yizhong. Eventually, Yizhong came to accept Shi Hong's fate.

In 338, he served as the Champion General during the Later Zhao and Murong tribe's joint campaign on the Duan tribe in Liaoxi. During the campaign, he and Zhi Xiong commanded the vanguard with 70,000 troops to attack Duan Liao. In 345, he was made Credential Bearer and Grand Champion General and given command over ten commanderies and the Six Tribes.

Yizhong stood out in Shi Hu court for being both humble yet very blunt with his words, his most notable habit being that he referred to everyone, including Shi Hu, as "you (汝; rǔ)" rather than their respective titles when talking to them. Shi Hu greatly valued him and put aside any judgement when it came to him. On major discussions, Shi Hu always gave Yizhong the final say on what was to be carried out, and the ministers all feared him because of this. Despite Shi Hu's flattery, Yizhong remained stern and strict when it came to the law. On one occasion, the brother of Shi Hu's favorite concubine, Zuo Wei (左尉), trespassed into his camp and harassed the soldiers. Yizhong eventually caught him and, despite Zuo Wei's relations, was set to have him executed for his crimes. Zuo Wei was said to have kowtowed relentlessly until his head began to bleed. Yizhong's subordinate urged him to let him off, and so Yizhong did.

=== Liang Du's Rebellion ===
In 349, Shi Hu had chosen Shi Shi as his new heir and declared himself Heavenly King, but a crisis struck Zhao when Shi Hu was granting out amnesty. He had left out the guards of one of his sons, Shi Xuan (石宣), who were exiled to Liang province after Xuan was executed for killing his younger brother, Shi Tao (石韜) and attempting to assassinate his father. The guards rallied under their captain Liang Du (梁犢) and marched east to capture Luoyang, defeating many Zhao generals along the way. The rebels were joined by the people of Guanzhong, and their victories shocked Shi Hu so much that he was driven to illness.

As the rebels approached Luoyang, Shi Hu ordered his son, Shi Bin (石斌) to quell the rebellion together with Yizhong and Pu Hong. Before leaving to face them, Yizhong visited the capital to personally meet with Shi Hu. As Shi Hu was sick, he refused to come out and instead had Yizhong treated with food at the royal table. Yizhong was furious and demanded Shi Hu to meet him at once. After Shi Hu finally came out to see him, Yizhong said to him:

Is your dead son [Shi Xuan] what bothers you? It's even having you sick! When your children were young, you did not surround them with good people, so once they grew old, they only looked to kill each other. Your son had his faults, but punishing his subordinates was a step too far, and that drove them to rebellion. You have been ill for quite a while, and your heir is still a child. If something bad were to happen to you, then the world will be thrown into chaos. Worry about this rather than those rebels. The longing to return home had turned Liang Du and his men into treacherous thieves. Their wicked acts alone guarantees their capture. This old Qiang requires a fervent vanguard to deal with them in one fell swoop.

Shi Hu immediately made Yizhong Commissioner Bearing Credentials, Palace Attendant, and General Who Conquers The West. He also gifted Yizhong an armoured horse without formality or ceremony as Yizhong disliked them. Before embarking, he said to Shi Hu, "Observe, do you think this Old Qiang will smash these rebels?" He wore his armour and mounted his new steed before leaving without any further say. Yizhong joined the Grand Commander Shi Bin at Xingyang, where he took Liang Du's head and destroyed the remaining rebel forces. With the rebellion crushed, Shi Hu awarded Yizhong with the title Duke of Xiping Commandery.

== During the Ran Min Disturbance ==
=== Reign of Shi Shi and Shi Zun ===
Despite the rebellion's demise, Shi Hu's body had taken a toll on him and he would die shortly after in 349. He was succeeded by his preteen son Shi Shi as expected but many including Yao Yizhong were angry that actual power was held by Empress Dowager Liu and the Prime Minister Zhang Chai in the court. This was made worse when Liu and Zhang sent an army to kill the Minister of Works, Li Nong. While returning from their campaign against Liang Du, Yizhong and other prominent generals such as Pu Hong and Shi Min conspired with Shi Shi's half-brother, Shi Zun at Licheng (李城; in present-day Wen County, Henan) to overthrow Shi Shi and his regents. Later, Shi Zun took the capital and executed Shi Shi, the Empress Dowager and Zhang Chai along with their followers, proclaiming himself as the new emperor.

Shi Zun did not last a year however, as he was executed following a coup by Shi Min, the adopted Han Chinese grandson of Shi Hu, who had found out of Zun's plans to kill him. Shi Min and his ally Li Nong installed Zun's brother Shi Jian as the new emperor, but power was virtually held by the duo. Shi Jian's brother, Shi Zhi, who was positioned in Xiangguo (襄國, in modern Xingtai, Hebei) called for a coalition against Shi Min and Li Nong. Among those who joined the coalition was Yizhong, who rose in Shetou.

=== Wei-Zhao War ===
The following year, Yao Yizhong camped at Hunqiao (混橋) to campaign against Shi Min (now named Ran Min). His sons Yao Yi (姚益) and Yao Ruo (姚若) managed to escape Yecheng and joined their father. Yizhong and the Di general Pu Hong both wanted the strategic position of Guanyou (關右, west of present-day Tongguan County, Shaanxi). Yizhong sent his fifth son, Yao Xiang to capture it but Pu Hong routed him and occupied the area. Meanwhile, Shi Zhi formally declared himself as emperor after Shi Jian was killed by Ran Min, and Yizhong was appointed as his Prime Minister of the Right. Meanwhile, Yizhong chose Yao Xiang as his heir due to the popular support that Xiang was receiving.

Ran Min eventually besieged Xiangguo, and Shi Zhi desperately called Yizhong for help. Yizhong sent Yao Xiang to lift the siege, but not before asking him to swear that he would capture Ran Min, and contacted the state of Former Yan to send reinforcements. Former Yan sent Yue Wan and together with Yao Xiang and Shi Kun (石琨), they attacked Ran Min from three sides, dealing him a major defeat. However, Ran Min managed to escape, and after Yao Xiang's return, Yizhong had him flogged for not fulfilling his promise.

Shi Zhi and his ministers were later assassinated by a defector named Liu Xian, allowing Ran Min to occupy the city. With the emperor dead, Yao Yizhong decided to submit to the Jin dynasty. Jin received his surrender and appointed him Grand Chanyu.

== Death and posthumous honours ==
In 352, Yao Yizhong grew deathly ill. He advised his sons to serve the Jin dynasty, as the Shi clan with the recent deaths of its last members under Shi Kun was no more. Yizhong died shortly after at the age of 72 and was succeeded by Yao Xiang, who marched with his followers south to formally join Jin. Although Yao Xiang served Jin for a while, he claimed independence after his ally Yin Hao grew suspicious of him and tried to kill him. Yao Xiang carried his father's coffin around until he was killed in battle in 357 when fighting Former Qin forces. Former Qin's emperor Fu Sheng ordered that Yizhong’s body be buried as a prince in Ji County (冀縣, present-day Gangu County, Gansu), Tianshui. When his 24th son, Yao Chang, became emperor of Later Qin in 386, Yizhong was posthumously named Emperor Jingyuan.
