= Empress Dong (Ran Min's wife) =

Empress Dong (董皇后, personal name unknown) was the only empress of the short-lived Chinese state Ran Wei.

Her husband was its only emperor, Ran Min. When he proclaimed the new state in 350 after overthrowing the Later Zhao emperor Shi Jian and declared himself emperor, he created her empress and created her oldest son Ran Zhi crown prince.

After he was captured and executed by Former Yan's prince Murong Jun in 352, Former Yan forces quickly arrived at the Ran Wei capital Yecheng. Empress Dong, Ran Zhi, and high-level officials led by the commander of armed forces Jiang Gan (蔣幹) tried to hold out and enlist Jin assistance (by sending Jin the imperial seals that had previously been Jin's, but had passed through the hands of Han-Zhao and Later Zhao emperors), but even with (limited) assistance Jin provided, could not hold out.

The city fell in late 352, and Empress Dong and Ran Zhi surrendered. Publicly claiming (falsely) that Empress Dong had surrendered the imperial seals, Murong Jun created her the Lady Fengxi (奉璽君, literally "the lady who offered the imperial seals") and Ran Zhi the Marquess of Haibin. No further record of them were mentioned (although officials named Ran in the later Northern Wei Dynasty claimed descent from Ran Min, presumably through Ran Zhi), and it is not known when Empress Dong died.

Chinese royalty
Preceded by Empress Zhang of Later Zhao	Empress of China (Northern); 350–352	Succeeded by Empress Kezuhun of Former Yan
Preceded by Empress Zhang of Later Zhao	Empress of China (Central); 350–352	Succeeded by Empress He Fani of Jin
