= Ran Min =

Emperor of the Chinese state of Ran Wei from 350 to 352

Emperor Ping of Wei 魏平帝

Emperor of Ran Wei
- Reign: 350 – 17 May 352 (Note: bingzi day of the 4th month of the 8th year of the Yonghe era)
- Born: Unknown
- Died: 1 June 352 (Note: xinmao day of the 5th month of the 8th year of the Yonghe era)
Full name
- Family name: Born Shí (石), later Rǎn (冉); Given name: Mǐn (閔)
Era name and dates
- Yǒngxīng (永興): 350 – 8 September 352 (Note: gengwu day of the 8th month of the 8th year of the Yonghe era)
Posthumous name
- Heavenly King Wudao/Daowu (武悼天王/悼武天王, by the Former Yan); Emperor Ping (平皇帝, by the Ran family)
- Dynasty: Ran Wei

Ran Min (simplified Chinese: 冉闵; traditional Chinese: 冉閔; pinyin: Rǎn Mǐn; died 352), also known as Shi Min (石閔), posthumously honored by the Former Yan as Heavenly King Wudao of (Ran) Wei ((冉)魏武悼天王), (Note: Vol.99 of Zizhi Tongjian recorded his posthumous name as "Daowu" (悼武).) courtesy name Yongzeng (永曾), nickname Jinu (棘奴), was a military leader during the era of Sixteen Kingdoms in China and the only emperor of the short-lived state Ran Wei (冉魏). He was known for ordering the massacre of the Jie and other Hu (Xiongnu) people, during which 200,000 people, both Han and non-Han people, were killed between 349 and 350.

In the Book of Jin, Shi Min was described as over 1.9 meters (8 chi) tall and possessed unusual physical strength. In battle, he fought by wielding two weapons in both hands, consisting of a crescent shaped Chinese halberd by his right hand, and a double-edged spear by his left hand. His ride was a horse named Zhu Long (朱龍; "Red Dragon"), which was recorded in his final battle.

== Family background ==
Ran Min's father Ran Liang (冉良), who later changed his name to Ran Zhan (冉瞻), was from Wei Commandery (魏郡, roughly modern Anyang, Northern Henan) and was a descendant of an aristocratic family, but one who must have, in the serious famines c. 310, joined a group of refugees known as the Qihuo led by Chen Wu (陳午). When Later Zhao's founder Shi Le defeated Chen in 311, he captured the 11-year-old Ran Zhan as well, and for reasons unknown, he had his nephew Shi Hu adopt Ran Zhan as his son and change his name accordingly to Shi Zhan. Ran Min's mother was named Wang (王). It is not known when he was born, but he would have been known as Shi Min.

A Shi Zhan was mentioned to have died in battle when Shi Hu was defeated by Han-Zhao's emperor Liu Yao in 328, but it is not clear whether this Shi Zhan was Shi Min's father.

== During Shi Hu's reign ==
As Ran Min grew in age, Shi Hu became impressed by his bravery in battle and battlefield tactics, and he treated Shi Min as his own grandson. In the year 338, the Later Zhao army retreated after a long siege of Jicheng (棘城, in modern Jinzhou, Liaoning). On the way, they were defeated by Murong Ke's troops sent by Murong Huang, and suffered heavy losses. At that time, all the armies abandoned their armor and fled. The only army group that remained intact was the one commanded by Ran Min. Due to this achievement, Ran Min's reputation was greatly enhanced.

Later, Ran Min advised Shi Hu to eliminate Fu Hong, as he saw Fu Hong and his sons' great influence could destabilize the state. However, Shi Hu rejected his advice and instead promoted Fu Hong to a higher position.

In 339, when the Jin general Yu Liang considered launching a major campaign against Later Zhao, Shi Hu chose to react, and he had his general Kui An command five generals, one of whom was Shi Min, to attack Jin's northern regions. (Note: Shi Min's later ally Li Nong was one of the other generals, while Shi Hu's son Shi Jian the Prince of Yiyang was another.) Shi Min was successful in his task, and the five generals together inflicted heavy damages, thwarting Yu's plans. For his accomplishments, Shi Min was created the Duke of Wuxing.

In 349, Ran Min participated in suppressing the Liang Du mutiny led by the garrison soldiers and made great military achievements. After that, his prestige increased, and all the veteran generals of the Han and non-Han ethnic groups were afraid of him.

== After Shi Hu's death ==
After Shi Hu's death in May 349, his youngest son and crown prince Shi Shi became emperor, but the government was controlled by Shi Shi's mother Empress Dowager Liu and the official Zhang Chai. Shi Shi's older brother Shi Zun, the Prince of Pengcheng, was unhappy about the situation, and a number of generals who were unimpressed with Empress Dowager Liu and Zhang, including Ran Min, suggested that he march to the capital Yecheng and overthrow them. Shi Zun did so – and also promised to create Ran Min crown prince if they were victorious.

On 12 June, Shi Zun's army was stationed in Dangyin, with 90,000 soldiers, and Ran Min was appointed as the vanguard. Zhang Chai planned to send troops to intercept them, but when the soldiers and civilians of Yecheng heard that Shi Zun and his men had arrived, they all fled the city to surrender, and Zhang Chai was unable to stop them. Shi Zun successfully entered Yecheng, killed Zhang Chai, deposed Shi Shi, and ascended the throne as emperor. He then appointed Ran Min as the commander-in-chief of all military forces at home and abroad, the general of the auxiliary state, and the recorder of the imperial secretariat, to assist in government Affairs.

Shi Zun claimed the imperial title. However, he did not appoint Ran Min crown prince as promised, but rather appointed another nephew Shi Yan (石衍) crown prince. Further, while he gave Ran Min important posts, he did not allow him to have control of the government, as Ran Min wished. Ran Min became disgruntled.

At this time, prince Shi Chong, who was stationed at Jicheng, led an army of 50,000. He decided to depose Shi Zun after he heard that Shi Zun had killed Shi Shi and established himself as the emperor. Shi Zun's attempt to persuade Shi Chong to withdraw failed, so he sent Ran Min and Li Nong to lead 100,000 elite soldiers to attack Shi Chong. Ran Min and his troops defeated Shi Chong at Pingji and captured him in Yuanshi County (Note: Shi Chong was later executed.), killing more than 30,000 of his soldiers.

In winter 349, (Note: The 10th to 12th months of that year correspond to 28 Oct 349 to 24 Jan 350 in the Julian calendar.) in fear of Ran Min, Shi Zun summoned a meeting of the princes before his mother, Empress Dowager Zheng, announcing that he would execute Ran Min. Empress Dowager Zheng opposed, reasoning that Ran Min's contributions during the coup against Shi Shi had to be remembered. Shi Zun hesitated, and meanwhile, Shi Jian, one of the princes attending the meeting, quickly reported the news to Ran Min, who acted quickly and surrounded the palace, capturing and executing Shi Zun, Empress Dowager Zheng, Shi Zun's wife Empress Zhang, Shi Yan, and several key officials loyal to Shi Zun. He made Shi Jian emperor, but he and Li Nong seized the control of the government.

Shi Jian could not endure Ran Min's hold on power, and he sent his brother Shi Bao, the Prince of Leping, and the generals Li Song (李松) and Zhang Cai (張才) against Ran Min, but after they were defeated Shi Jian pretended as if they had acted independently and executed them all. Another brother of his, Shi Zhi the Prince of Xinxing, then rose in the old capital Xiangguo, in alliance with the Qiang chieftain Yao Yizhong and the Di chieftain Pu Hong against Ran Min and Li Nong. Shi Jian then tried to have the general Sun Fudu (孫伏都), a fellow ethnic Jie, attack Ran Min, but Ran Min quickly defeated him, and Shi Jian, trying to absolve himself, then ordered Ran Min to execute Sun. Ran Min, however, began to realize that Shi Jian was behind Sun's attack, and he decided that he needed to disarm the Jie people, who knew that he was not a Jie but ethnically Han. He ordered that all Han not be allowed to carry arms, and most non-Chinese fled Yecheng after that. Ran Min put Shi Jian under house arrest with no outside communication.

As the non-Chinese tribes continued fleeing Yecheng, Ran Min realized that he would not be able to use the Jie and other Hu (胡; mainly tribes of Xiongnu background) people, so he issued an order to the ethnic Han according to which each civil servant who killed one Hu and brought his head to him would be promoted in rank by three degrees, and a military officer would be transferred to the service at his Supreme Command. Ran Min himself led the Han in killing the Jie and Hu without regard for wealth, sex or age; during the day tens of thousands of heads were severed. Troop commanders in various parts of the state also received a rescript from Ran Min to purge the Hu soldiers under their command. In total over 200,000 people were killed; it was recorded that "corpses were piled outside the city walls, where they were all eaten by jackals, wolves, and wild dogs." Among the people who died in the massacre, many were in fact ethnic Han who had high big noses, deep-set eyes and thick full beards, which were considered by people of that time to be the indicators of non-Han. This massacre by Ran Min has an adverse effect to the ethnic Jie population.

In the first month of the Chinese year 350 (Note: corresponding to 25 Jan to 22 Feb 350 in the Julian calendar), Ran Min wanted to "eliminate the traces of the Shi family" and used the prophecy of "After Zhao, come Li," as an excuse to change the country's name to "Wey" (衞), change his own surname to "Li", implement a general amnesty, and change the reign era to Qinglong. Some researchers believe that Ran Min's move was "still for the purpose of continuing the great unity of the Later Zhao Dynasty and maintaining the system of governance." However, the changes were received negatively as many of the imperial family members and generals fled Yecheng to join Shi Zhi, who soon proclaimed himself the new Emperor of Zhao at Xiangguo.

At this time, Shi Kun, Zhang Ju, and Wang Lang led an army of 70,000 to attack Yecheng. Ran Min led over a thousand cavalrymen to resist them in the north of the city. Ran Min, armed with a double-edged spear, charged forward. Shi Kun's forces were completely crushed, leaving with 3,000 rebel heads taken. Subsequently, Ran Min and Li Nong led 30,000 cavalrymen to attack Zhang Hedu, who occupied Shidu. In the leap (second) month, Shi Jian secretly sent eunuchs to send a letter to Zhang Shen and others, asking them to take advantage of the situation and attack Yecheng. The eunuchs reported this to Ran Min and Li Nong, who returned quickly, deposed and killed Shi Jian along with 38 of Shi Hu's grandsons. The Shi clan in Yecheng was completely wiped out.

== As emperor of Ran Wei ==
After initially offering the throne to Li Nong, Ran Min openly declares himself as Emperor of the new state of Wei (魏). He honored his mother Lady Wang with the title of Empress Dowager, appointed his wife Lady Dong an empress, and made his oldest son Ran Zhi his crown prince. His other sons and his ally Li Nong were made princes, Li Nong's sons were given titles of dukes. He proclaimed a general amnesty, hoping to have the generals who became independent abide by his edicts, but few of them accepted, though most Han generals outwardly did not defy him either. For unknown reasons, he soon killed Li and his sons. He sent a letter to Emperor Mu of Jin's court with a mixed message, appearing to invite Jin to send forces north and agreeing to submit, but the letter could also be read as a defiant challenge. Jin did not react, although it began to also seek allegiance of the generals in the former territory of Later Zhao southern provinces.

After Ran Min established Wei, he offered Xin Mi, an intellectual and calligrapher, with the position of Ceremonials chamberlain. However, Xin Mi declined this offer and instead he wrote a letter to advise Ran Min to surrender and join the Eastern Jin. After this, Xin Mi then starved himself to death. The letter of Xin Mi for Ran Min is preserved in his personal biography in the Book of Jin and Quan shanggu Sandai Qin Han Sanguo Liuchao wen.

Between November 350 and March 351 AD, Ran Min personally led an army of 100,000 to besiege Xiangguo. Shi Zhi was forced to seek aid from the invading Former Yan from the north, even demoting his own title from Emperor of Zhao to Prince of Zhao. The allied forces of Former Yan, Shi Kun, and Yao Yizhong then rushed to his aid. Ran Min refused to withdraw his troops and divided them to block the attack, but failed. Later, he ignored the advice of General Wang Tai to hold his ground and, relying on the advice of a soldier named Fa Rao that "celestial phenomena guarantee victory," he launched an all-out attack. Shi Zhi seized the opportunity to attack from the rear. The three allied forces encircled, and Ran Min's forces suffered a complete rout at the hands of Yao Xiang's Qiang troops, resulting in more than 100,000 fatalities. Ran Min himself managed to escaped to Yecheng with only a dozen cavalrymen, while his son Ran Yin and many of his generals were captured and executed.

Liu Xian, after briefly submitting to Ran Min, proclaimed himself emperor. The western provinces were taken over by Fu Jiàn, who established Former Qin. The southern provinces largely switched their allegiance to Jin. Meanwhile, Former Yan, which had already captured Youzhou (modern Beijing, Tianjin, and northern Hebei) and moved its capital to Jicheng (modern Beijing), continued to advance south. Ran Min, having captured Xiangguo in early 352 and executed Liu Xian, decided to head north to face Former Yan's army, against the advice of several officials who felt that his army needed a rest.

=== Death ===
Ran Min stationed his troops at Anxi, accompanied by Murong Ke. Ran Min advanced toward Changshan, pursued relentlessly by Murong Ke all the way to Liantai, Weichang County, Zhongshan Commandery (present-day northeast of Wuji, Hebei). During this period, Ran Min engaged Former Yan's general Murong Ke, Murong Jun's brother, in battle, defeating him in ten battles and achieving victory. Convinced that his own forces consisted primarily of infantry, while the Former Yan were predominantly cavalry, Ran Min led his troops into the jungle. Murong Ke first dispatched troops to lure the Wei army back to flat ground. Taking advantage of Ran Min's tendency to underestimate the enemy and his eagerness to engage despite his small force, he divided his army into three divisions: the center, left, and right. He selected five thousand Xianbei men skilled in archery, chained their warhorses together with iron chains, and formed a square formation , which he deployed at the front of the army. As the battle ensued, Murong Ke pretended to lose several skirmishes and then retreat, tricking Ran Min and his Chinese infantry into the open field, and then used his elite Xianbei cavalry to surround Ran Min's infantry, inflicting great losses. Ran Min himself wielded two weapons, one in each hand, and fought fiercely, inflicting many casualties on the Xianbei soldiers. However Ran Min's famous horse Zhu Long ("Red Dragon") suddenly died, and he fell off and was captured by the enemies.

Former Yan's forces delivered him to Murong Jun, and he insulted Murong Jun. Murong Jun had him whipped 300 times and then executed, although was soon fearful that his spirit was causing a drought, and therefore honored him with the lesser imperial title of Heavenly King and the posthumous name Daowu. In addition, the epitaph of Dianhua of the Northern Wei dynasty, who claimed to be a descendant of Ran Min, states that his posthumous name was Emperor Ping.

Ran Min's wife Empress Dong and her son Ran Zhi would hold out for several more months, but eventually surrendered later that year, ending Ran Wei's brief existence.

== Evaluation ==
Ran Min was mostly known for his order to execute the Jie and Hu people. His wars in Jizhou led several millions of migrants of different races to flee.

Modern Chinese historian Lü Simian compared Ran Min with Xiang Yu of the short-lived Western Chu and Sun Ce of the late Eastern Han dynasty due to his personal prowess and courage on the battlefield.

Another historian Fan Wenlan assessed Ran Min for his bravery and brutality. Wenlan wrote that despite his brutal reign of three years massacring the Jie and Xiongnu people, Ran Min still managed to gain sympathy from the ethnic Han population due to the fact that this act was seen as divine retribution against those who suppressed the Han people earlier. It was due to this reason that his enemy, Murong Jun, offered sacrifices and posthumous tributes for Ran Min after his death, because he was afraid that the Han people would sympathize with Ran Min.

Cai Dongfan condemned Ran Min's opportunistic nature by usurping his superior, the Shi clan who ruled Later Zhao Dynasty, and for his brutality of massacring the Jie and Hu people. He framed Ran Min as a figure who cannot be trusted to rule China.

== Personal information ==
- Father
  - Ran Zhan (冉瞻), later adopted by Shi Hu and name changed to Shi Zhan (石瞻), likely died 327 in battle against Han-Zhao, posthumously honored as Emperor Gao
- Mother
  - Empress Dowager Wang
- Wife
  - Empress Dong
- Children
  - Ran Zhi (冉智), the Crown Prince (created 350), later created the Marquess of Haibin by Former Yan
  - Ran Yin (冉胤), Prince of Taiyuan (created prince 350, killed by Later Zhao emperor Shi Zhi 351)
  - Ran Ming (冉明), Prince of Pengcheng (created prince 350)
  - Ran Yu (冉裕), Prince of Wuxing (created prince 350)
  - Ran Cao (冉操)

== See also ==
- Jie (ethnic group)
- Wu Hu
- List of past Chinese ethnic groups
- Later Zhao
- Shi Hu
- Genocide
- Former Yan

== Appendix ==
=== Bibliography ===
- Yoshiaki Kawamoto 川本, 芳昭 (2005). 中華の崩壊と拡大 魏晋南北朝; 中国の歴史05 [The Collapse and Expansion of China: Wei, Jin, Northern and Southern Dynasties; Chinese History 05] (in Japanese). 講談社.
- 小野, 響 (2020). 後趙史の研究 [Research on the History of Later Zhao] (in Japanese). 講談社. ISBN 978-4-7629-6061-1.

Regnal titles
New creation	Emperor of Ran Wei; 350–352	Extinct
Titles in pretence
Preceded by Shi Jian	— TITULAR — Emperor of China; 350–352; Reason for succession failure: Replaced by Former Yan	Succeeded by Murong Jun
Preceded by Shi Zhi	— TITULAR — Emperor of China; 350–352; Reason for succession failure: Replaced by Former Yan	Succeeded by Emperor Mu of Jin
