= Duan Kan =

Duan Kan 段龕
- Duke of Qi

Ruler of Duan Qi
- Reign: 350–356
- Born: Unknown
- Died: 357
Full name
- Family name: Duàn (段); Given name: Kān (龕)
Regnal name
- 350–351: King of Qi (齊王); 351–356: General Who Guards the North, Duke of Qi (鎮北將軍 齊公)
- Dynasty: Duan Qi

Duan Kan (simplified Chinese: 段龛; traditional Chinese: 段龕; pinyin: Duàn Kān) (died 357) was a Xianbei military general of the Later Zhao during the Sixteen Kingdoms period. In 350, taking advantage of the Later Zhao collapse, he occupied the Shandong peninsula and declared himself the King of Qi. His state of Qi (simplified Chinese: 齐; traditional Chinese: 齊; pinyin: Qí; 350–356) is known in historiography as Duan Qi (simplified Chinese: 段齐; traditional Chinese: 段齊; pinyin: Duàn Qí). Duan Kan's state lasted for six years before it was conquered by the Former Yan in 356.

== Background ==
Duan Kan was a member of the Duan-Xianbei tribe in Liaoxi as the son of Duan Lan. After the fall of the Duan duchy in 338, Duan Lan fled but later found himself serving under the Later Zhao dynasty, who stationed him at his tribe's old capital in Lingzhi (令支, in present-day Qian'an, Hebei). After Duan Lan died, Duan Kan inherited his position.

As the Later Zhao collapsed under the weight of civil war in 350, Duan Kan led his followers south and occupied Chenliu Commandery (陳留郡; around present-day Kaifeng, Henan). He refused to acknowledge the authority of Shi Min, who had forcibly took control of the emperor and the Zhao capital, Ye. Instead, from Chenliu, he invaded and took over Qing province (modern central and eastern Shandong), where he declared himself the King of Qi at his new capital, Guanggu (廣固, in modern Qingzhou, Shandong).

== Reign ==
Qi 齊
- 350–356
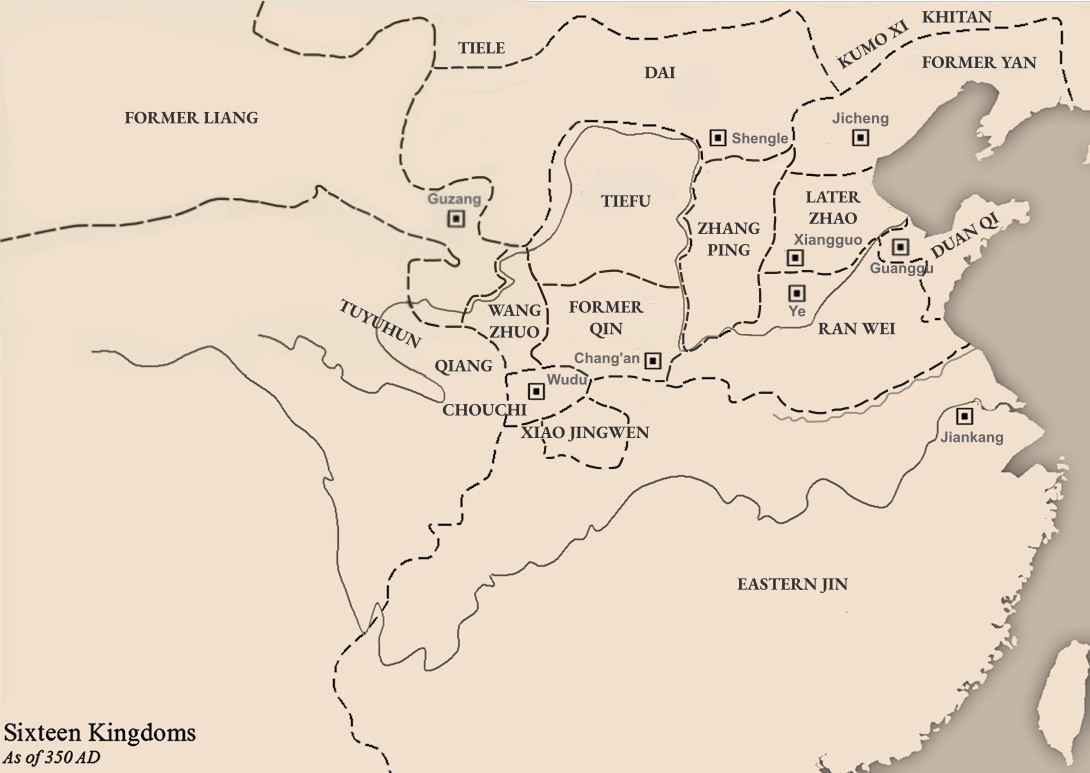
- Capital: Guanggu
- Government: Monarchy
- King / Duke
  - 350–356: Duan Kan
- Historical era: Sixteen Kingdoms
  - Established: 350
  - Disestablished: 356
  - Duan Kan's death: 357
Preceded by	Succeeded by
Later Zhao	Former Yan
- Today part of: China

=== Early rule ===
Throughout its short existence, the Duan Qi state was deeply entrenched. While Shandong's natural terrain offered them a robust defense, it appears that they did not, or were unable to, make any real effort to expand. They were also surrounded by their more powerful neighbours, Eastern Jin and Former Yan. In 351, Duan Kan became a vassal to Jin, who appointed him the General Who Guards the North and demoted his title to Duke of Qi. Still, he remained largely independent as Jin had no direct control over his territory.

Conflict between Duan Qi and Former Yan first began in 354, when Yan's Inspector of Qing province, Zhu Tu (朱禿) assassinated a member of the imperial family, Murong Gou (慕容鉤) and defected to Qi. In 355, Duan Kan sent a letter to the Yan ruler, Murong Jun, denouncing his decision to declare himself emperor. The letter was also written in a manner of writing between cousins, as Jun's mother was from the Duan tribe. Insulted, Jun sent his brother, Murong Ke and general, Yang Wu to attack Qi.

As Murong Ke's soldiers approached, Duan Kan's brother, Duan Pi (段羆) proposed that he be sent with elite soldiers to hold the line along the Yellow River while Duan Kan defend Guanggu. However, Duan Kan rejected this strategy and eventually executed his brother out of anger for continuining to insist upon it.

=== Siege of Guanggu ===
In early 356, Murong Ke's army crossed the Yellow River. Duan Kan led 30,000 troops out of Guanggu to face in battle but was defeated in battle. His brother, Duan Qin (段欽) was captured while his officials, Yuan Fan (袁范), Pilu Yu (辟閭蔚) and others were killed. Many of Duan Kan's soldiers surrendered as he retreated back to his capital, prompting Murong Ke to lay siege.

While Duan Kan held on to Guanggu, Murong Ke built forts and cultivated land to prepare for a long siege. He also granted amnesty to any Qi city that surrendered. Among those who surrendered was Qi's Inspector of Xu province, Wang Teng (王騰). After several months of siege, Duan Kan sent his subordinate Duan Yun (段薀) to request for aid from Jin. Jin sent the general, Xun Xian to help him, but fearful of the Yan army's strength, he stopped his advance once he reached Langya Commandery.

Murong Ke remained patient throughout the siege and refused to make any rash attacks on the city. His soldiers were willingly supplied with food by the people of Shandong. In contrast, the inhabitants of Guanggu were starving as they were cut off from their food supply, leading to widespread cannibalism. Desperately, Duan Kan mustered his remaining troops and once again led them out to give battle, but was defeated within the Yan encirclement. Ke also sent his troops to guard the entrance to the city while they fought. Duan Kan was forced to personally fight his way back into the city and barely did so alone as his soldiers were wiped out. Morale within Guanggu plummeted and its people were no longer willing to fight.

=== Fall and aftermath ===
On 22 December 356, Duan Kan finally surrendered to Yan, bounding himself and arresting Zhu Tu for Yan to punish for killing Murong Gou. Zhu Tu was subjected to the Five Punishments while Duan Kan was pardoned and appointed the General of Obedient Submission. Around 3,000 Xianbei, Jie and other tribal households from Duan Kan's former territory were moved to the Yan capital at Ji. Despite his initial leniency, for unknown reasons, Murong Jun had Duan Kan killed, first poisoning his eyes, and buried alive 3,000 of his followers in 357.

== See also ==
- Xianbei
- Ethnic groups in Chinese history
- Five Barbarians
- Duan tribe
- Ran Min
