= 295 =

295 in various calendars
- Gregorian calendar: 295; CCXCV
- Ab urbe condita: 1048
- Assyrian calendar: 5045
- Balinese saka calendar: 216–217
- Bengali calendar: −299 – −298
- Berber calendar: 1245
- Buddhist calendar: 839
- Burmese calendar: −343
- Byzantine calendar: 5803–5804
- Chinese calendar: 甲寅年 (Wood Tiger); 2992 or 2785 — to — 乙卯年 (Wood Rabbit); 2993 or 2786
- Coptic calendar: 11–12
- Discordian calendar: 1461
- Ethiopian calendar: 287–288
- Hebrew calendar: 4055–4056
- Hindu calendars
- Vikram Samvat: 351–352
- Shaka Samvat: 216–217
- Kali Yuga: 3395–3396
- Holocene calendar: 10295
- Iranian calendar: 327 BP – 326 BP
- Islamic calendar: 337 BH – 336 BH
- Javanese calendar: 175–176
- Julian calendar: 295; CCXCV
- Korean calendar: 2628
- Minguo calendar: 1617 before ROC 民前1617年
- Nanakshahi calendar: −1173
- Seleucid era: 606/607 AG
- Thai solar calendar: 837–838
- Tibetan calendar: ཤིང་ཕོ་སྟག་ལོ་ (male Wood-Tiger); 421 or 40 or −732 — to — ཤིང་མོ་ཡོས་ལོ་ (female Wood-Hare); 422 or 41 or −731

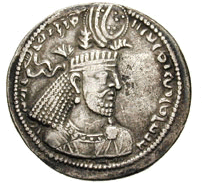
King Narseh of Persia

Year 295 (CCXCV) was a common year starting on Tuesday of the Julian calendar, the 295th Year of the Common Era (CE) and Anno Domini (AD) designations, the 295th year of the 1st millennium, the 95th year and last 6 years of the 3rd century, and the 6th year of the 290s decade. At the time, it was known as the Year of the Consulship of Tuscus and Anullinus (or, less frequently, year 1048 Ab urbe condita). The denomination 295 for this year has been used since the early medieval period, when the Anno Domini calendar era became the prevalent method in Europe for naming years.

== Events ==
=== By place ===
==== Roman Empire ====
- Emperor Diocletian defeats the Carpi.
- Caesar Galerius completes a series of two campaigns in Upper Egypt, against the rebel cities of Coptos and Boresis, as well as the Blemmyes and Meroitic Nubians.
- The jurist Hermogenianus, at the court of Diocletian, produces the Hermogenian Code. This new codification of Roman law complements the Gregorian Code of c. 292.
- Diocletian, perhaps through Galerius, issues an edict against incest.

==== China ====
- Tuoba Luguan divides the territory of the Tuoba clan into three areas. His nephews Tuoba Yilu and Tuoba Yituo become chieftains of the western and central areas of (Shanxi province). Tuoba Luguan dominates the eastern area (near Hohhot).

=== By topic ===
==== Religion ====
- Petra rejoins the province of Palestine, and is converted to Christianity by the Syrian monk Barsauma.

== Births ==
- Shi Hu, Chinese emperor of Later Zhao (d. 349)

== Deaths ==
- Maximilian of Tebessa, Berber Christian saint and martyr
