= 339 =

339 in various calendars
- Gregorian calendar: 339; CCCXXXIX
- Ab urbe condita: 1092
- Assyrian calendar: 5089
- Balinese saka calendar: 260–261
- Bengali calendar: −255 – −254
- Berber calendar: 1289
- Buddhist calendar: 883
- Burmese calendar: −299
- Byzantine calendar: 5847–5848
- Chinese calendar: 戊戌年 (Earth Dog); 3036 or 2829 — to — 己亥年 (Earth Pig); 3037 or 2830
- Coptic calendar: 55–56
- Discordian calendar: 1505
- Ethiopian calendar: 331–332
- Hebrew calendar: 4099–4100
- Hindu calendars
- Vikram Samvat: 395–396
- Shaka Samvat: 260–261
- Kali Yuga: 3439–3440
- Holocene calendar: 10339
- Iranian calendar: 283 BP – 282 BP
- Islamic calendar: 292 BH – 291 BH
- Javanese calendar: 220–221
- Julian calendar: 339; CCCXXXIX
- Korean calendar: 2672
- Minguo calendar: 1573 before ROC 民前1573年
- Nanakshahi calendar: −1129
- Seleucid era: 650/651 AG
- Thai solar calendar: 881–882
- Tibetan calendar: ས་ཕོ་ཁྱི་ལོ་ (male Earth-Dog); 465 or 84 or −688 — to — ས་མོ་ཕག་ལོ་ (female Earth-Boar); 466 or 85 or −687

Year 339 (CCCXXXIX) was a common year starting on Monday of the Julian calendar. At the time, it was known in Rome as the Year of the Consulship of Constantius and Claudius (or, less frequently, year 1092 Ab urbe condita). The denomination 339 for this year has been used since the early medieval period, when the Anno Domini calendar era became the prevalent method in Europe for naming years. It was the 339th year of the Common Era (CE) and Anno Domini (AD) designations, the 339th year of the 1st millennium, the 39th year of the 4th century, and the 10th and last year of the 330s decade.

== Events ==
=== By place ===
==== Roman Empire ====
- Emperor Constantius II hastens to his territory in the East, where a revived Persia under King Shapur II is attacking Mesopotamia. For the next 11 years, the two powers engage in a war of border skirmishing, with no real victor.

=== By topic ===
==== Religion ====
- Pope Julius I gives refuge in Rome to the Alexandrian patriarch Athanasius, who is deposed and expelled during the First Synod of Tyre (see 335).
- Eusebius of Nicomedia is made bishop of Constantinople, while another Arian succeeds Athanasius as bishop of Alexandria, under the name Gregory.

== Births ==
- Aurelius Ambrosius, Italian bishop and theologian (d. 397)
- He Fani, Chinese empress of the Jin Dynasty (d. 404)
- Shi Shi, Chinese emperor of Later Zhao (d. 349)

== Deaths ==
- Abaye, Babylonian rabbi of the Jewish Talmud
- Xi Jian (or Daohui), Chinese general (b. 269)
- Duan Liao, Chinese chieftain of the Duan state (Xianbei)
- Eusebius of Caesarea, Greek bishop (approximate date).
- Khosrov III (the Small), Roman client king (approximate date)
- Wang Dao (or Maohong), Chinese politician (b. 276)
