= 318 =

318 in various calendars
Gregorian calendar	318; CCCXVIII
Ab urbe condita	1071
Assyrian calendar	5068
Balinese saka calendar	239–240
Bengali calendar	−276 – −275
Berber calendar	1268
Buddhist calendar	862
Burmese calendar	−320
Byzantine calendar	5826–5827
Chinese calendar	丁丑年 (Fire Ox); 3015 or 2808 — to — 戊寅年 (Earth Tiger); 3016 or 2809
Coptic calendar	34–35
Discordian calendar	1484
Ethiopian calendar	310–311
Hebrew calendar	4078–4079
- Hindu calendars
Vikram Samvat	374–375
Shaka Samvat	239–240
Kali Yuga	3418–3419
Holocene calendar	10318
Iranian calendar	304 BP – 303 BP
Islamic calendar	313 BH – 312 BH
Javanese calendar	199–200
Julian calendar	318; CCCXVIII
Korean calendar	2651
Minguo calendar	1594 before ROC 民前1594年
Nanakshahi calendar	−1150
Seleucid era	629/630 AG
Thai solar calendar	860–861
Tibetan calendar	མེ་མོ་གླང་ལོ་ (female Fire-Ox); 444 or 63 or −709 — to — ས་ཕོ་སྟག་ལོ་ (male Earth-Tiger); 445 or 64 or −708

Year 318 (CCCXVIII) was a common year starting on Wednesday of the Julian calendar. At the time, it was known as the Year of the Consulship of Licinianus and Crispus (or, less frequently, year 1071 Ab urbe condita). The denomination 318 for this year has been used since the early medieval period, when the Anno Domini calendar era became the prevalent method in Europe for naming years.

== Events ==
=== By place ===
==== Roman Empire ====
- Emperor Constantine the Great gives the ancient Roman town Drepana (Asia Minor) the name Helenopolis, after his mother Helena, and builds a church in honour of the martyr St. Lucian.
- Constantine the Great is given the title Brittanicus Maximus, for successful engagements in Britain.

==== Asia ====
- The Eastern Jin dynasty loses its territories to the north of the Yangtze River, to the benefit of the Xiongnu and the Xianbei. The Former Zhao state is proclaimed; Liu Can and the state ruling family at Pingyang is executed in a coup d'état by Jin Zhun, who is in turn overthrown by Shi Le and Liu Yao.
- Liu Yao becomes the new emperor of Han-Zhao and moves his capital to Chang'an.

=== By topic ===
==== Religion ====
- Gregory the Illuminator appoints his son Aristax as successor in the patriarchate of Armenia.

== Births ==
- Liu, Chinese empress and wife of Shi Hu (d. 349)

== Deaths ==
- February 7 – Min of Jin, Chinese emperor (b. 300)
- August 31 – Liu Cong, Chinese emperor
- Fan Changsheng, Chinese religious leader
- Jin Zhun, Chinese official and chancellor
- Liu Can (or Shiguang), Chinese emperor
- Liu Kun, Chinese general and poet (b. 270)
- Theodota of Philippi, Greek harlot and martyr
