= Empress Du =

Empress Du (杜皇后) may refer to:

- Empress Du (Jin dynasty) (321–341), personal name Du Lingyang, empress of the Jin dynasty
- Empress Du (Later Zhao) (died c. 348), personal name Du Zhu, empress of the Later Zhao dynasty
- Empress Dowager Du (902–961), empress dowager of the Song dynasty
