= Xie Fei =

Xie Fei may refer to:

- Xie Fei (inventor), scholar in Later Zhao Jie Huns state; made a south-pointing carriage c. 340
- Xie Fei (revolutionary) (1913–2013), Chinese revolutionary, participant in the Long March, third wife of Liu Shaoqi
- Xie Fei (politician) (1932–1999), Chinese politician, former governor of Guangdong
- Xie Fei (director) (born 1942), Chinese film director
