= Xie Fei (inventor) =

Xiè Fēi (Chinese: 解飛; fl. 334–349) was a scholar of the Later Zhao state during the Sixteen Kingdoms period of Chinese history. He served as Head of the Healing (Medicinal) Department in the State Chancellery. He is known as a mechanical engineer who built a south-pointing chariot (also called a "south-pointing carriage"), a directional compass vehicle which apparently did not use magnetic principles, but was operated by use of differential gears (which apply equal amounts of torque to driving wheels rotating at different speeds), or a similar angular differential principle.

For the great ingenuity shown in the construction of the device, the Later Zhao Emperor Shi Hu granted him the noble title of hou (marquis) without land possessions and rewarded him generously.
