= Zheng Yingtao =

Chinese empress consort (died 349)

Zheng Yingtao (Chinese: 鄭櫻桃; died 349) was an empress consort of China's Jie-led Later Zhao dynasty. She was Shi Hu (Emperor Wu)'s first empress, but not his first wife.

== Life ==
Zheng Yingtao became a concubine of Shi Hu's, apparently when he was in his late teens, circa 312. Traditional historians implied that she was a courtesan before becoming Shi Hu's concubine. Shi Hu favored her greatly, and she was purportedly involved in persuading him to kill his first two wives, Lady Guo and Lady Cui. They had at least two sons, his oldest son Shi Sui (石邃) and Shi Zun. In 333, after the death of Shi Hu's uncle Shi Le (Emperor Ming), the founding emperor of Later Zhao, Shi Hu quickly took power in a coup, holding Shi Le's heir Shi Hong as a puppet, and he forced Shi Hong to create him the Prince of Wei. Lady Zheng was created the Princess of Wei, and her son Shi Sui the Crown Prince of Wei.

=== Empress consort ===
After Shi Hu deposed Shi Hong in 334, he did not immediately give Princess Zheng a greater title, but after he claimed the "Heavenly King" (Tian Wang) title in 337, he created her empress and created Shi Sui crown prince. Later that year, however, after discovering that Shi Sui, unable to stand his constant rebukes and whippings, had plotted to kill him, he killed Shi Sui and deposed Empress Zheng to the title of Duchess Dowager of Donghai. The empress title went to Du Zhu.

=== Empress dowager ===
Nothing further was recorded of her activities until Shi Hu's death in 349. Initially, Shi Hu's youngest son Shi Shi was proclaimed emperor pursuant to Shi Hu's wishes, but Shi Zun soon overthrew him and his mother Empress Dowager Liu in a coup and claimed imperial title. The former Empress Zheng became empress dowager, and Shi Zun consulted her on major decisions. In late 349, Shi Zun, at a meeting with a number of his brothers and Empress Dowager Zheng attending, announced a plan to execute Shi Min the Duke of Wuxing—Shi Hu's adopted grandson and a fierce general, but one whose ambitions had made Shi Zun apprehensive of him. The princes all announced agreement, but Empress Dowager Zheng opposed, reasoning that Shi Min had contributed much to Shi Zun's coup against Shi Shi and it would be ungrateful to execute him. Shi Zun hesitated, while one of his brothers, Shi Jian the Prince of Yiyang, reported the plot to Shi Min, who quickly surrounded Shi Zun's palace and executed him. Empress Dowager Zheng was also killed.

== Legacy ==
The Tang dynasty poet Li Qi wrote the poem "A Song of Cherry Zheng" describing Zheng Yingtao's favour in the harem because of her beauty. The poem was misinterpreted and some mistook Zheng Yingtao as a young male entertainer who was the lover of Shi Hu.

Chinese royalty
Preceded by Empress Liu	Empress of Later Zhao; 337	Succeeded by Empress Du
