= Du Zhu =

Chinese empress

Du Zhu (Chinese: 杜珠) was an empress of the Chinese/Jie state Later Zhao. She was Shi Hu (Emperor Wu)'s second empress.

Du Zhu was initially a family courtesan from a general of Jin, Wang Jun. After she was captured by the army of Later Zhao, she was given by Shi Le to Shi Hu as a concubine under Shi Hu's pleading, with the title Cairen (才人). When Shi Hu became "Heavenly King" (天王) she was given the title Zhaoyi (昭儀). Du Zhu was said to have a soft nature and mood. She bore Shi Hu at least two sons—Shi Xuan (石宣) and Shi Tao (石韜). Shi Xuan carried the title of Duke of Hejian, and Shi Tao the Duke of Qin.

In 337, after Shi Hu's first crown prince Shi Sui (石邃) was executed for having plotted his father's assassination, Shi Xuan, as the next son in age, was created crown prince. Shi Sui's mother Empress Zheng Yingtao was deposed, and Consort Du was created empress to replace her.

Nothing further was mentioned about Empress Du herself in historical records. In 348, after Shi Xuan killed Shi Tao after a dispute between the brothers, Shi Hu had him executed cruelly, ordered all his family killed and then deposed Empress Du, although he did not kill her. There was no further record of her in history, and it is not known when she died.

Chinese royalty
Preceded by Empress Zheng Yingtao	Empress of Later Zhao; 337–348	Succeeded by Empress Liu
