= Shi Zhi =

Emperor of Later Zhao from 350 to 351

Shi Zhi 石祗

Emperor of Later Zhao
- Reign: 350–351
- Predecessor: Shi Jian
- Died: 351
Names
- Shi Zhi (石祗)
Era name and dates
- Yǒngníng (永寧): 350–351
- House: Shi
- Dynasty: Later Zhao
- Father: Shi Hu

Shi Zhi (Chinese: 石祇; died 351) was the final emperor of the Jie-led Chinese Later Zhao dynasty. He was the last of four short-lived emperors after the death of his father Shi Hu (Emperor Wu). Shi Zhi reigned briefly for about a year. He is sometimes referred to by his title prior to becoming emperor, Prince of Xinxing (新興王).

Virtually nothing is known about Shi Zhi's career during his father Shi Hu's reign, including when he was created prince, who his mother was, or what role, if any, he had in his father's government. It is known that, by his father's death, he was the Prince of Xinxing. By 349, when his brother Shi Jian the emperor was effectively the puppet of their powerful, ethnically Han adoptive nephew Shi Min in the capital Yecheng, Shi Zhi rose at his defense post at the old capital Xiangguo, in alliance with the Qiang chief Yao Yizhong and the Di chief Pu Hong. They had some initial success in getting the non-Han people of the empire to join them against Shi Min, but soon the Han coalesced around Shi Min, who changed his family name back to his father's original Ran (冉). In early 350, Ran Min killed Shi Jian and established the short-lived Ran Wei dynasty. Shi Zhi then declared himself emperor, and he engaged in indecisive battles against Ran Min. Meanwhile, local generals throughout the empire were waiting to watch who would be the victor of the war, while neighboring states Jin and Former Yan began to encroach on Later Zhao's territory. Former Yan, in particular, seized modern Beijing, Tianjin, and northern Hebei and continued to march south.

In late 350 and early 351, Pu Hong's son Fu Jiàn (Pu Hong having changed his family name from Pu (蒲) to Fu (苻) in 350) seized the western part of Later Zhao, declaring himself Heavenly King (Tian Wang) and establishing Former Qin. Shi Zhi, occupied with fighting Ran Min, could do nothing. Indeed, under siege in Xiangguo by Ran, he demoted his own title from emperor to Prince of Zhao and sought help from Former Yan's prince Murong Jun against Ran, who initially agreed and allied with him to defeat Ran temporarily. Shi Zhi then sent his general Liu Xian to attack Ran in Yecheng, but Liu not only was defeated by Ran but was so awed by and fearful of him that he agreed to kill Shi Zhi for him. Once Liu returned to Xiangguo, then, he arrested and killed Shi Zhi and his high-level officials, presenting Shi Zhi's head to Ran. Ran burned the head publicly on a busy street in Yecheng. Later Zhao was at its end.

Prince of Xinxing House of Shi Died: 351
Regnal titles
Preceded by Shi Jian	Emperor of Later Zhao; 350–351	Extinct
Titles in pretence
Preceded by Shi Jian	— TITULAR — Emperor of China; 350–351; Reason for succession failure: Replaced by Ran Wei	Succeeded by Ran Min
Preceded by Shi Jian	— TITULAR — Emperor of China; 350–351; Reason for succession failure: Replaced by Ran Wei	Succeeded by Fu Jiàn
