= Ran Zhi =

Ran Zhi (Chinese: 冉智; died c. 354) was the crown prince of the short-lived Chinese state Ran Wei. His father was the state's only emperor, Ran Min.

Ran Zhi, as Ran Min's oldest son, was created crown prince when he proclaimed the new state in 350 after overthrowing the Later Zhao emperor Shi Jian and declared himself emperor. He created Ran Zhi's mother Lady Dong empress. After he was captured and executed by Former Yan's prince Murong Jun in 352, Empress Dong tried to hold out but was eventually forced to surrender. Murong Jun created her the Lady Fengxi and created Ran Zhi the Marquess of Haibin. In 354, the Former Yan official Song Bin (宋斌) was accused of leading a plot to have Ran Zhi made emperor, and it was said that all who were involved were executed — implying, but not explicitly stating, that Ran Zhi was executed as well.
