= Wei Commandery =

Historical commandery of China

Wei Commandery (Chinese: 魏郡) was a historical commandery of China, located in modern southern Hebei and northern Henan.

The commandery was created during Emperor Gaozu of Han's reign, with its seat at Ye. In late Western Han, it administered 18 counties, namely Ye (鄴), Guantao (館陶), Chiqiu (斥丘), Sha (沙), Neihuang (內黃), Qingyuan (清淵), Wei (魏), Fanyang (繁陽), Yuancheng (元城), Liangqi (梁期), Liyang (黎陽), Jipei (即裴), Wushi (武始), Hanhui (邯會), Yin'an (陰安), Ping'en (平恩), Hangou (邯溝) and Wu'an (武安). The population was 909,655, or 212,849 households in 2 AD. By 140 AD, four counties (Jipei, Wushi, Hanhui, Hangou) had been resolved, whereas a new county, Quliang (曲梁), was added. The population was 695,606, or 129,310 households.

In late Eastern Han dynasty, Wei Commandery became the center of the Wei Kingdom, fief of Cao Cao, who expanded the commandery, increasing the total number of counties to 29. New official posts, Colonel of the East (東部都尉) and Colonel of the West (西部都尉) were created to assist in administering the territory. After the establishment of the Cao Wei dynasty, these areas became new commanderies Yangping (陽平) and Guangping (廣平), respectively. At the unification of Jin dynasty in 280 AD, the commandery had 8 counties, and a population of 40,700 households.

Under the Eastern Wei which moved the capital to Ye, Wei Commandery was briefly renamed Wei Yin (魏尹), similar to how Jingzhao was named during the Han dynasty. 13 counties were recorded in the Book of Wei, namely Ye (鄴), Linzhang (臨漳), Fanyang (繁陽), Lieren (列人), Changle (昌樂), Wu'an (武安), Linshui (臨水), Wei (魏), Pingyi (平邑), Yiyang (易陽), Yuancheng (元城), Chizhang (斥章) and Guixiang (貴鄉), with a total population of 438,024, or 122,613 households. The commandery was abolished in early Sui dynasty.

In Sui and Tang dynasties, Wei Commandery became an alternative name of Xiang Prefecture (相州, centered around modern-day Anyang) until 742. Afterwards, the name was applied to Wei Prefecture (魏州) to the north of Xiang.
