= Hou (title) =

Ancient Chinese ruler

Hou (Chinese: 后; pinyin: Hòu) was a title for an ancient Chinese ruler, equivalent to King/Queen or Emperor/Empress.

The Chinese character Hou (后) is an ideogrammic compounds; in oracle bone script, it is written the same as Si (司, means "to rule") as the combination of mouth (口) and hand (手). Hou usually refers to female rulers in oracle bone script. In the Xia dynasty, the title for Kings of Xia was Hou; for example, the term Xia Hou Shi (夏后) means King of Xia. Kings of Shang and Zhou dynasties only used the term Hou to refer to the kings posthumously. Instead of Hou, they had their own title, Wang, and Hou turned to refer to the Queen, the wife of the King.
