= Shi Zun =

Shi Zun 石遵

Emperor of Later Zhao
- Reign: 349
- Predecessor: Shi Shi
- Successor: Shi Jian
- Died: 349
Names
- Shi Zun (石遵)
Era name and dates
- Tàiníng (太寧): 349
- House: Shi
- Dynasty: Later Zhao
- Father: Shi Hu

Shi Zun (Chinese: 石遵) (died 349) was briefly (for 183 days) an emperor of the Jie-led Chinese Later Zhao dynasty. He was the second of four short-lived emperors after the death of his father Shi Hu (Emperor Wu). He is sometimes referred to by his title prior to becoming emperor, Prince of Pengcheng (彭城王).

== Before and during Shi Hu's reign ==
Shi Zun was a son of Shi Hu and his (then-)favorite, Zheng Yingtao, who also bore Shi Hu his oldest son, Shi Sui (石邃). After Shi Hu seized power after the death of his uncle and Later Zhao's founding emperor Shi Le in 333, he forced the new emperor Shi Hong to create him the Prince of Wei and all of his sons princes—and it was this time that Shi Zun was created the Prince of Qi. Shi Hu would seize the throne in 334, and after he declared himself "Heavenly King" (Tian Wang) in 337, he changed the ranks of all of his sons except Shi Sui to dukes, and so Shi Zun became the Duke of Pengcheng. His mother Princess Zheng was created empress, while his older brother Shi Sui was created crown prince. Later in 337, however, Shi Sui would be executed for plotting their father's death, and Empress Zheng was also demoted in rank to Duchess Dowager of Donghai.

During most of Shi Hu's reign, Shi Zun apparently served as a general. In 348, after Shi Hu executed his second crown prince, Shi Xuan (石宣) for having assassinated his brother Shi Tao (石韜), he considered whom to make crown prince. The official Zhang Ju (張舉) recommended two of Shi Hu's son—Shi Zun, whom he praised for having literary abilities and virtues, and Shi Bin (石斌) the Duke of Yan, whom he praised for knowing military strategies. However, based on Zhang Chai's recommendation, Shi Hu created his youngest son Shi Shi crown prince instead.

== Coup against Shi Shi ==
As Shi Hu grew ill in 349, he intended for Shi Zun and Shi Bin to serve as co-regents for Shi Shi, disappointing Shi Shi's mother Empress Liu and Zhang Chai. Empress Liu and Zhang forged edicts sending Shi Zun to Guanzhong and executing Shi Bin. After Shi Shi took the throne shortly after Shi Hu's death, Shi Zun was offered honored titles with intent to appease him, but he was not satisfied. He, by now with the title Prince of Pengcheng (after Shi Hu claimed imperial title earlier in the year and created all of his sons princes), allied with the generals Yao Yizhong (姚弋仲), Pu Hong (蒲洪), Liu Ning (劉寧), Shi Min the Duke of Wuxing, and Wang Luan (王鸞), none of whom was particularly happy about Shi Shi's selection, marched to the capital Yecheng (鄴城, in modern Handan, Hebei), capturing it easily and killing Zhang Chai. Shi Zun then forged an edict from Empress Dowager Liu deposing Shi Shi and granting himself the throne, and then executed Shi Shi and Empress Dowager Liu. He honored his mother, the former Empress Zheng, as empress dowager, while creating his wife Princess Zhang empress. Further, he created Shi Bin's son Shi Yan (石衍) crown prince, disappointing Shi Min, his adoptive nephew, whom he had promised to make crown prince.

== Reign ==
Despite his disappointment, Shi Min subsequently led Shi Zun's forces in defeating and killing Shi Zun's brother Shi Chong (石沖) the Prince of Pei, who had declared Shi Zun a renegade for having murdered the rightful heir Shi Shi. After his accomplishments in defeating Shi Shi and Shi Chong's forces, Shi Min wanted greater power in the government, but Shi Zun denied his wishes. During the next few months, Later Zhao local generals, while still outwardly obeying Shi Zun's authority, began to gradually peel away from the central government, expecting further trouble to come at the center. Also sensing that Later Zhao was crumbling, neighboring states Former Yan and Jin planned invasions against it, although the main invasions would not come until after Shi Zun's reign.

That trouble came as Shi Zun, realizing Shi Min's anger toward him, summoned a gathering of princes before Empress Dowager Zheng, in which he announced he was going to execute Shi Min. However, Empress Dowager Zheng opposed this action, and Shi Zun hesitated. Meanwhile, one of the princes, Shi Jian the Prince of Yiyang, informed Shi Min of Shi Zun's plan, and Shi Min quickly led his troops in arresting Shi Zun. Shi Min then executed him (along with Empress Dowager Zheng, Empress Zhang, Crown Prince Yan, and a number of officials that Shi Zun trusted) and made Shi Jian emperor.

== Personal information ==
- Father
  - Shi Hu (Emperor Wu)
- Mother
  - Empress Zheng Yingtao
- Wife
  - Empress Zhang

Prince of Pengcheng House of Shi Died: 349
Regnal titles
Preceded by Shi Shi	Emperor of Later Zhao; 349	Succeeded by Shi Jian
Titles in pretence
Preceded by Shi Shi	— TITULAR — Emperor of China; 349; Reason for succession failure: Sixteen Kingdoms	Succeeded by Shi Jian
