= Empress Liu (Later Zhao dynasty) =

Empress Liu (Chinese: 劉皇后; personal name unknown) (318–349) was an empress consort of the Jie-led Later Zhao dynasty of China. She was Shi Hu (Emperor Wu)'s third and final empress. She served as regent in 349.

== Life ==
The future Empress Liu was the youngest daughter of the final Former Zhao emperor Liu Yao. After her father was captured by Later Zhao's founding emperor Shi Le in 329, she accompanied her brothers Liu Xi the Crown Prince and Liu Yin the Prince of Nanyang in fleeing from the Former Zhao capital Chang'an to Shanggui (上邽, in modern Tianshui, Gansu). Later that year, Liu Yin tried to recapture Chang'an and was defeated by Shi Hu, who marched on to Shanggui and captured it, killing Liu Xi and Liu Yin. She was captured by his subordinate Zhang Chai and offered to him. She, at 11, became his concubine. In 339, she gave birth to his youngest son, Shi Shi. He was created the Duke of Qi.

=== Empress ===
In 348, after executing his second crown prince Shi Xuan (石宣) for having assassinated his younger brother Shi Tao (石韜) and for plotting against himself, Shi Hu considered whom to make his new crown prince. Zhang, believing that he could hold power jointly with Consort Liu if she were to become empress dowager, suggested to Shi Hu that the reasons why his prior crown princes rebelled was that their mothers were of low birth. Shi Hu agreed, and he created Shi Shi crown prince and Consort Liu empress.

=== Regent ===
In early 349, Shi Hu grew ill, and he ordered that his sons Shi Zun the Prince of Pengcheng and Shi Bin (石斌) the Prince of Yan be made joint regents for Shi Shi. This interfered with Empress Liu's and Zhang's plans to control the government, and they issued false edicts sending Shi Zun away and executing Shi Bin. Shi Hu soon died, and Shi Shi succeeded him. Empress Liu became empress dowager, and she served as regent, holding power jointly with Zhang. She tried to placate Shi Zun and Shi Jian the Prince of Yiyang by giving them high posts. However, Shi Zun did not accept and marched on the capital Yecheng. Empress Dowager Liu tried to placate him by offering him the regent office and the nine bestowments, but that could not stop him from entering the capital and seizing power. He executed Zhang, and then forged an edict by Empress Dowager Liu deposing Shi Shi and giving him the throne. Shi Shi was created the Prince of Qiao, and Empress Dowager Liu was given the title of Princess Dowager of Qiao, but soon Shi Zun executed both of them.

Chinese royalty
Preceded by Empress Du	Empress of Later Zhao; 348–349	Succeeded by Empress Zhang
