= Shi Jian =

Shi Jian 石鑒

Emperor of Later Zhao
- Reign: 349–350
- Predecessor: Shi Zun
- Successor: Shi Zhi
- Died: 350
Names
- Shi Jian (石鑒)
Era dates
- Tàiníng (太寧): 349; Qīnglóng (青龍): 350
- House: Shi
- Dynasty: Later Zhao
- Father: Shi Hu

Shi Jian (Chinese: 石鑒) (died 350) was briefly (for 103 days) an emperor of the Jie-led Later Zhao dynasty of China. He was the third of four short-lived Later Zhao emperors after the death of his father Shi Hu (Emperor Wu). He is sometimes referred to by his title prior to becoming emperor, Prince of Yiyang (義陽王). Arguably, it was his machinations with his powerful adoptive nephew Shi Min against his brother Shi Zun that finally led to Later Zhao's downfall.

Not much is known about Shi Jian prior to his father's death—including who his mother was. He was created the Prince of Dai in 333 after his father seized power from the founding emperor Shi Le's son Shi Hong in a coup, and after Shi Hu claimed the title "Heavenly King" (Tian Wang) in 337, he carried the title Duke of Yiyang. He was repromoted to prince after his father claimed imperial title in early 349. In 342, he was mentioned as one of the dukes whose guard corps was reduced by his brother Shi Xuan (石宣) the crown prince, whose target was however actually Shi Tao (石韜) the Duke of Qin. In 345, he was mentioned as the commander of the Guanzhong region, and he imposed heavy taxes and labor burdens; further, he forced officials with long hair to pull out their hair to be made into hat decorations. After his secretary submitted the hair to Shi Hu, Shi Hu recalled him and replaced him with his brother Shi Bao (石苞) the Duke of Leping.

In 349, after Shi Hu's death and succession by his youngest son, Shi Shi, the regent, Shi Shi's mother Empress Liu, tried to appease both Shi Jian and Shi Zun the Prince of Pengcheng by naming them to high posts. However, Shi Zun was not placated, and he attacked the capital Yecheng and seized the throne, killing Shi Shi and Empress Dowager Liu. During Shi Zun's brief administration, Shi Jian was an important member of the administration. He was one of the princes summoned to a meeting called by Shi Zun before his mother Empress Dowager Zheng in which Shi Zun announced that he was going to execute their powerful adoptive nephew, Shi Min the Duke of Wuxing. Shi Jian, who had perhaps already been in conspiracy with Shi Min, quickly sent Shi Min the news, and Shi Min surrounded the palace with his troops, capturing and killing Shi Zun. He made Shi Jian the emperor. However, actual power were in Shi Min's and his ally Li Nong (李農)'s hands.

Shi Jian could not endure Shi Min's hold on power, and he sent his brother Shi Bao and the generals Li Song (李松) and Zhang Cai (張才) against Shi Min, but after they were defeated, Shi Jian pretended as if they acted independently and executed them all. Another brother of his, Shi Zhi the Prince of Xinxing, then rose in the old capital Xiangguo (襄國, in modern Xintai, Hebei), in alliance with the Qiang chieftain Yao Yizhong and the Di chieftain Pu Hong against Shi Min and Li Nong. Shi Jian tried to then have the general Sun Fudu (孫伏都), a fellow Jie, attack Shi Min, but Shi Min quickly defeated him, and Shi Jian, trying to absolve himself, then ordered Shi Min to execute Sun. Shi Min, however, began to realize that Shi Jian was behind Sun's attack, and he decided that he needed to disarm the Jie, who knew that he was not Jie but ethnically Chinese. He ordered that all non-Chinese not be allowed to carry arms, and most fled Yecheng in light of the command. Shi Min put Shi Jian under house arrest with no communication with the outside. As the non-Chinese tribes continued to flee Yecheng, Shi Min saw that, in particular, the Xiongnu and the Jie would never support him, so he issued an order that if a Chinese killed a Hu (barbarian) and presented the head, he would be rewarded. Some 200,000 died in the massacre—including many Chinese who had high noses and thick beards.

In 350, under duress from Shi Min, Shi Jian changed the name of the state from Zhao to Wei (衛) and the family name of the imperial clan from Shi to Li (李). Many key officials fled to Shi Zhi. Local generals throughout the empire effectively became independent, waiting for the war to resolve itself. As Shi Min was engaging his troops against Shi Zhi's, Shi Jian made one final attempt against him—ordering the general Zhang Shen (張沈) to, after Shi Min left the capital, attack it. However, Shi Jian's eunuchs reported this to Shi Min and Li Nong, and they quickly returned to Yecheng and executed Shi Jian, along with 28 grandsons of Shi Hu and the rest of the Shi clan. Shi Min, restoring his father's original family name of Ran (冉), then took the throne as the emperor of a new state, Wei (魏, note different character than the state declared previously). Effectively, Later Zhao was over, although Shi Zhi would hold out at Xiangguo until 351, when he would be killed by his general Liu Xian (劉顯), finally ending Later Zhao's last hope.

Prince of Yiyang House of Shi Died: 350
Regnal titles
Preceded by Shi Zun	Emperor of Later Zhao; 349–350	Succeeded by Shi Zhi
Titles in pretence
Preceded by Shi Zun	— TITULAR — Emperor of China; 349–350; Reason for succession failure: Sixteen Kingdoms	Succeeded by Shi Zhi
Preceded by Shi Zun	— TITULAR — Emperor of China; 349–350; Reason for succession failure: Sixteen Kingdoms	Succeeded by Ran Min
