= Shi Hu =

Emperor Wu of Later Zhao 後趙武帝
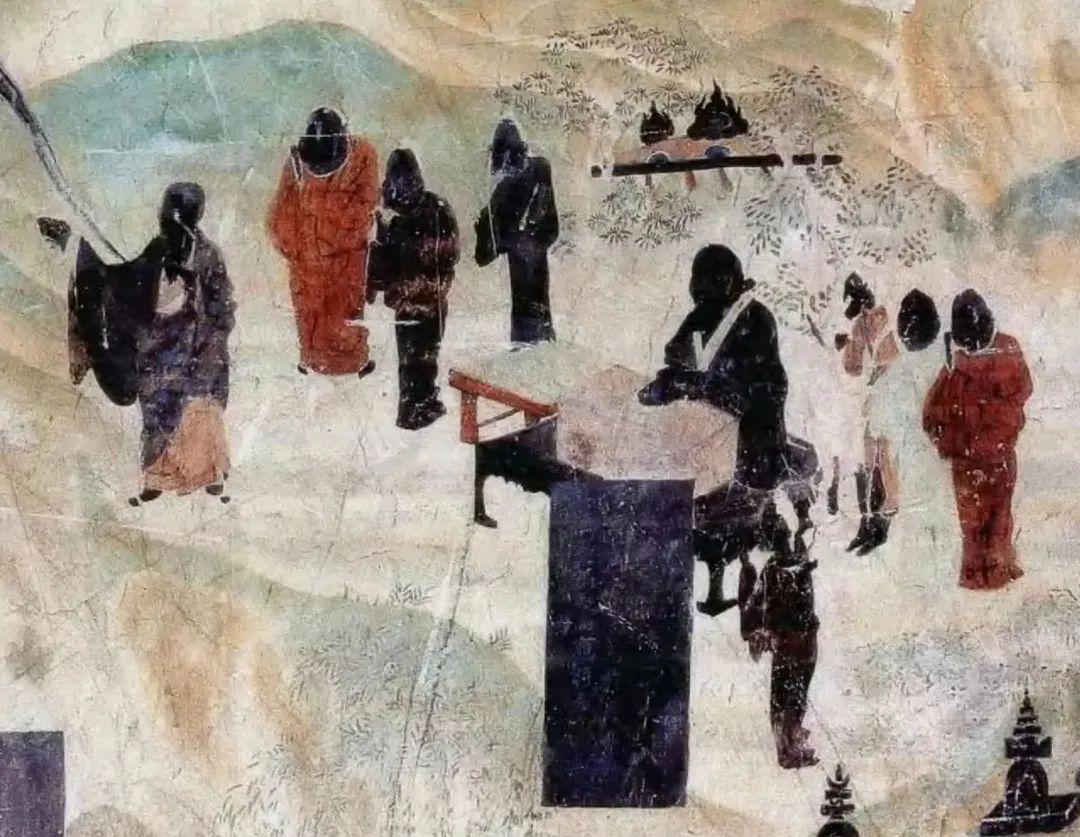
- Painting of Shi Hu (seated) from cave 323 of the Mogao Caves in Dunhuang.

Emperor of Later Zhao
- Reign: 334–349
- Predecessor: Shi Hong
- Successor: Shi Shi
- Born: 295
- Died: 349 (aged 53–54)
- Burial: Xianyuan Mausoleum (顯原陵)
- Spouse: Zheng Yingtao; Du Zhu; Empress Liu
- Issue: Shi Jian; Shi Zun; Shi Zhi; Shi Shi
Names
- Shi Hu (石虎)
Era dates
- Jiànwǔ (建武): 335–349; Tàiníng (太寧): 349
Regnal name
- Regent Heavenly King of Zhao (居攝趙天王, 334–347); Heavenly King of Great Zhao (大趙天王, 337–349); Emperor (349)
Posthumous name
- Emperor Wu (武皇帝)
Temple name
- Taizu (太祖)
- House: Shi
- Dynasty: Later Zhao
- Father: Shi Kuomi (石寇覓)

Shi Hu (Chinese: 石虎; 295 – 26 May 349), courtesy name Jilong (季龍), also known by his posthumous name as the Emperor Wu of Later Zhao (後趙武帝), was an emperor of the Jie-led Chinese Later Zhao dynasty. He was the founding emperor Shi Le (Emperor Ming)'s distant nephew and adopted brother, who took power in a coup after Shi Le's death from Shi Le's heir Shi Hong. Due to Tang dynasty naming taboo, he is referred to using his courtesy name (石季龍) in the Book of Jin.

Shi Hu was a talented general who rarely lost battles, and Shi Le relied on him heavily in his conquest of northern and central China. However, he was also exceedingly cruel in his military campaigns in sparing not even useful people in captured cities from massacres. After he became the ruler of Later Zhao under the title of "heavenly king" (Tian Wang), he ruled the empire with a heavy hand, imposing heavy tax and labor burdens and spending much of his effort on constructing lavish palaces and expanding his harem. When two of his crown princes crossed him on separate occasions, he had them executed in brutal fashion. On the other hand, he was mindful of showing leniency towards his chief officials and propagated Buddhism by promoting religious freedom and revering the monk, Fotu Cheng. While he was alive, his empire remained intact, but as soon as he died, his sons and adopted grandson Ran Min engaged in an internecine war that destroyed both the empire and the Jie people.

== Early life ==
Shi Hu's father was named Koumi (寇覓) and was a son of a cousin of Shi Le's father Zhouhezhu (周曷朱). His father died early and he was raised by Zhouhezhu and his wife, Shi Le's mother Lady Wang, so Shi Hu was also sometimes referred to as Shi Le's brother. During the early 300s, a severe famine affected the Jie tribesmen, and Shi Hu became separated from Shi Le. Later, after Shi Le had become a powerful Han-Zhao general, Liu Kun the Jin governor of Bing Province (并州, modern northern and central Shanxi), where the Jie were from, located Shi Hu and Lady Wang and sent them to Shi Le along with messengers, trying to persuade Shi Le to defect from Han to Jin. Shi Le, in gratitude, sent horses and jewel to Liu, but did not accept his invitation. (Since the Jie did not appear to use family names, and Shi Le's own family name of "Shi" was given to him by his friend Ji Sang, presumably this was also the time that Shi Le gave Shi Hu the same family name and gave him the courtesy name Jilong as well, patterned after his own courtesy name Shilong (世龍).)

Shi Hu grew up in Shi Le's army, and when he was young, he became known for incessantly hunting and not following military orders, and particularly liked hitting people with sling bullets. Shi Le considered killing him, as the entire army was complaining about Shi Hu, but Lady Wang responded, "Before a fast bull grows up, it would often break wagons that it pulls. Endure him a little bit." By the time he got to age 18, he was about 184 cm tall, and he became known for his bravery in battle and skills in archery and horsemanship, and the entire army feared him. Shi Le gave him the sister of the general Guo Rong (郭榮) in marriage to him, but he favored his concubine Zheng Yingtao and, at Zheng's instigation, killed Lady Guo. The same happened to his next wife, Lady Cui. He also became known for his cruelty in governing his soldiers and in battle, as he often executed officers who disagreed with his wishes or had great abilities, and whenever he captured a city, he often slaughtered the entire population. Even though Shi Le rebuked him at times, he could not get Shi Hu to change his ways. However, despite his cruelty, he also gave his officers leeway in their tactics, and he often led them into battles fearless of dangers. Therefore, Shi Le trusted him greatly and made him one of his top lieutenants.

== During Shi Le's stint as Han-Zhao general ==
Shi Le frequently sent Shi Hu out in command of forces against important foes and gave him the title of Marquess of Fanyang. The enemies that Shi Hu engaged while serving under Shi Le included:

- 313 - Shi Hu defeated Liu Kun's nephew Liu Yan, who was then in control of the important city Yecheng (in modern Handan, Hebei), forcing Liu Yan to flee and yield control of Yecheng to him. Shi Le made Shi Hu the governor of Wei Commandery (with capital at Yecheng), and henceforth Shi Hu saw Yecheng as his personal possession, taking up residence in the three towers that Cao Cao had built.
- 317 - Shi Le sent Shi Hu to attack the Jin general Zu Ti, who was recapturing territory south of the Yellow River, but after he was unable to defeat Zu conclusively, Shi Hu was forced to withdraw. Zu would henceforth pose a major threat to Shi Le until Zu's death in 321.
- 318 - Shi Hu was a major general in Shi Le's campaign against Jin Zhun, who had assassinated the Han emperor Liu Can and slaughtered members of the imperial Liu clan. His victories over Jin Zhun's cousin and succession Jin Ming (靳明) forced Jin Ming to abandon the capital Pingyang (平陽, in modern Linfen, Shanxi) and surrender to the new emperor Liu Yao.
- 319 - Shi Hu defended against a Zu Ti attack against the Qihuo general Chen Chuan (陳川), who had earlier switched his allegiance from Jin to Shi Le, and he repelled Zu. Later in the year, Shi Hu attacked the Xianbei chief Riliuyan (日六延), based in the Hetao region (the area around the northern bend of the Yellow River, in modern Ningxia and western Inner Mongolia) and greatly defeated him.

In 319, Shi Le, after a dispute of Liu Yao, declared independence as the Prince of Zhao (thus establishing Later Zhao, named as such due to Liu Yao changing his state's name from Han to Zhao, distinguished as the Former Zhao), and he bestowed Shi Hu a number of offices and the title the Duke of Zhongshan.

== During Shi Le's reign as Later Zhao prince/emperor ==
After Shi Le's establishment of Later Zhao, he, even more so than before, extensively relied on Shi Hu to defeat major enemies. The major battles that Shi Hu engaged in included:

- 320 - Shi Hu captured Shao Xu, the Jin governor of Ji Province (冀州, modern western Shandong), one of the last major pockets of Jin resistance in northern China, in battle.
- 321 - Shi Hu captured Duan Pidi, the Jin governor of You Province (幽州, modern Beijing, Tianjin, and northern Hebei, even though he was no longer in control of You Province by that point) and his brother Duan Wenyang, wiping out the last major pocket of Jin resistance in northern China. (It was after this battle that Shi showed that while he was cruel, he had respect for his enemies, as after Duan Pidi refused to bow to him despite an implicit threat of death, he bowed to Duan out of respect.)
- 322 - Shi Hu captured the general Xu Kan, who had vacillated between allegiances to Jin and Later Zhao.
- 323 - Shi Hu captured the general Cao Ni, who had vacillated between allegiances to Jin, Former Zhao, and Later Zhao, and who was in control of most of modern Shandong, thus eliminating a major semi-independent domain in the north. It was after the siege of Cao's capital Guanggu (廣固, in modern Weifang, Shandong) that an example of Shi Hu's cruelty was shown—he wanted to slaughter all of the population of Guanggu. After Later Zhao's governor of Qing Province (青州, modern central and eastern Shandong), Liu Zheng (劉徵) protested that he was supposed to govern over the people and that he cannot govern without people, Shi nevertheless slaughtered most of the population but left 700 people alive for Liu to govern.
- 325 - With Later Zhao by this point in a state of constant war against Former Zhao, Shi Hu defeated and captured the Former Zhao general Liu Yue (劉岳) the Prince of Zhongshan, depriving the Former Zhao emperor Liu Yao of one of his key generals. He also captured and killed the Former Zhao general Wang Teng (王騰), who had earlier defected from Later Zhao.
- 328 - Shi Hu attacked Former Zhao, but was defeated by Liu Yao, who then attacked Luoyang. Shi Le had to personally relieve Luoyang, capturing Liu Yao in battle in early 329.
- 329 - After Liu Yao was captured, the Former Zhao crown prince Liu Xi and his brother Liu Yin abandoned the Former Zhao capital Chang'an and fled to Shanggui (上邽, in modern Tianshui, Gansu), but in the fall Liu Yin tried to recapture Chang'an. Shi Hu defeated him, forcing him to flee back to Shanggui, and then advanced on Shanggui, capturing it and killing Liu Xi and Liu Yin, ending Former Zhao.

As the years went by, Shi Hu began to develop an antagonistic relationship with Shi Le's key advisors Cheng Xia (the maternal uncle of Shi Le's crown prince Shi Hong) and Xu Guang, who had seen Shi Hu's ambitions and urged for Shi Le to curb his powers. The first conflict came in 326, when Shi Le, under Cheng's advice, had Shi Hong take over Yecheng's defenses, forcing Shi Hu's household to move out of the three towers. (Shi Hu retaliated by having soldiers in bandits' masquerades raid Cheng's home late at night, rape the women of his household, and rob them of their clothing.) In 330, after Shi Le successively claimed the titles of "Heavenly King" (Tian Wang) and emperor, Shi Hu was given title of Prince of Zhongshan, and two of his sons were also given title of princes as well. However, Shi Hu became incensed that he was not also given the title of Grand Chanyu, which Shi Le had granted to his son Shi Hong (石宏, note different character than his crown prince), and he secretly started plotting taking over after Shi Le's death. In 332, Shi Le tried to curb his powers by having the crown prince and the eunuch Yan Zhen (嚴震) participate in important decisions that were previously Shi Hu's to make, which only served to anger Shi Hu.

== Coup against Shi Hong ==
As Shi Le grew ill in 333, Shi Hu entered the palace to serve him in his illness and cut off his communication with the outside. Shi Hu then issued false edicts summoning Shi Hong the Prince of Qin (not the crown prince) and Shi Le's adopted son Shi Kan (石堪) the Prince of Pengcheng back to the capital Xiangguo (襄國, in modern Xintai, Hebei) and then detained them. When Shi Le died in the fall, Shi Hu immediately seized the crown prince Shi Hong and arrested and executed Cheng and Xu. Shi Hong, in fear, offered the throne to Shi Hu, but Shi Hu forced him to take the throne.

Shi Hu then forced Shi Hong to confer on him the title King of Wei—intentionally paralleling Cao Cao's title while preparing for usurpation of the Han throne—and granting him the nine bestowments. All of Shi Le's trusted officials were demoted or moved to posts with no real power, while Shi Hu's subordinates were moved into key positions. Shi Le's wife Empress Dowager Liu plotted with Shi Kan to try to start rebellions to overthrow Shi Hu, but after Shi Kan fled the capital but failed in his attempt to capture Linqiu (廩丘, in modern Puyang, Henan), Shi Hu captured him and cruelly executed him by burning. Soon thereafter, Empress Dowager Liu's role was discovered, and she was executed as well.

In winter 333, Shi Sheng (石生) the Prince of Hedong, in defense of Chang'an, and Shi Lang, in defense of Luoyang, declared a rebellion against Shi Hu and sought assistance from Jin. Pu Hong (蒲洪) the Di chief also rose and sought assistance from Former Liang. Shi Hu personally attacked Shi Lang and captured Luoyang easily, killing Shi Lang. He then attacked Chang'an with his son Shi Ting (石挺) the Prince of Liang, but Shi Ting was defeated by Shi Sheng's subordinate Guo Quan (郭權) and killed. Shi Hu was forced to withdraw. However, Shi Sheng did not know about this victory and, when the Xianbei chief Shegui (涉瑰) rebelled, he panicked and fled, abandoning Chang'an, and was killed in flight. Guo fled to Shanggui but was defeated in 334. Pu surrendered and was pardoned. That ended significant resistance to Shi Hu.

In 334, unable to endure Shi Hu's vengeance, Shi Hong personally carried imperial seals and visited Shi Hu's palace, offering to abdicate to him. Shi Hu declined with sarcastic language, and Shi Hong, knowing that Shi Hu had even crueler intentions, could carry out no other intentions. In late 334, Shi Hu deposed Shi Hong to the title the Prince of Haiyang, but soon had him, his mother Empress Dowager Cheng, and his brothers Shi Hong and Shi Hui (石恢) the Prince of Nanyang put to death. The officials offered the imperial title to Shi Hu, but Shi Hu declined and took the title "Regent Heavenly King" (攝政天王).

== Early reign ==
In 335, Shi Hu moved the capital from Xiangguo to Yecheng. Later that year, he (a self-avowed Buddhist), unhappy that he was unable to distinguish which monks had become monks because they truly believed Buddhism and which had taken vows to evade taxes and labor, considered outlawing commoners from becoming monks. However, after his officials proposed a far more extensive ban than he wanted, he cancelled the plan and instead issued an edict proclaiming religious freedom.

Starting 336, Shi Hu began a series of palace-building projects, completing a number of exceedingly luxurious palaces. One of them, Taiwu Palace (太武殿), was described in this manner:

The foundation was nine and a third meters tall, 65 steps long and 75 steps wide, all made of marble. The bottom contains a basement that is largely enough for 500 armed guards. The gaps between the bricks were filled with paint; the tops of buttresses was decorated with gold, and the top of columns were decorated with silver. The screens were made of pearls, and the walls were made of jade. The workmanship was extremely fine. The imperial bedroom has facilities including a bed made of white jade and comforters with fine ribbons, and on top of the comforters were sown in lotus flowers made of gold.

He further built nine additional palaces and selected many women to fill the palaces. The tax and labor burdens of these projects greatly encumbered the people, and he further gathered many men as soldiers with intent to conquer other states, increasing the burden.

In 337, Shi Hu claimed the title Heavenly King (Tian Wang), and he give title to his wife Zheng Yingtao empress and his son Shi Sui (石邃) crown prince, while his sons who were previously given title of princes were given duke titles instead.

Later in 337, Shi Hu would kill his recently appointed crown prince. Shi Sui was himself no less cruel than his father, and one of his favorite pastimes was to order a woman to dress well, and then behead her and eat her body. Shi Hu had put him in charge of most key decisions, but at times, when Shi Sui would report his decisions, Shi Hu would be angry and yell, "Why report such minute things?" while if Shi Sui did not do so, he would yell, "Why not report?" He would further whip Shi Sui at times he was angry. Shi Sui therefore considered assassinating his father. Shi Hu discovered this and killed Shi Sui's co-conspirators, but initially pardoned him. However, Shi Sui refused to apologize, and this angered Shi Hu, who deposed him and then executed him, along with his wife Crown Princess Zhang and his 26 children, burying them in one humongous coffin. He also killed some 200 subordinates of Shi Sui, and he deposed Empress Zheng to the title of Duchess Dowager of Donghai. He instead give title to his second son Shi Xuan (石宣) as crown prince and his mother Du Zhu as empress. However, he also favored another son by Empress Du, Shi Tao (石韜), and a rivalry between the brothers soon developed.

In late 337, Shi Hu entered into an alliance with the Former Yan prince Murong Huang to attack the Xianbei Duan tribe. In 338, the joint forces defeated and essentially wiped out the Duan, but Shi Hu, angry that Murong Huang withdrew his forces early, advanced on the Former Yan capital Jicheng (棘城, in modern Jinzhou, Liaoning) and surrounded it, intending to wipe Former Yan out. However, after nearly 20 days of siege, Later Zhao forces were unable to capture Jicheng and forced to withdraw, and they suffered heavy losses at the hands of a Former Yan general, Murong Huang's son Murong Ke. During the next few years, Later Zhao would have no real way of curbing Former Yan expansions, and was eventually forced to yield most of formerly Duan territory to Former Yan.

In 339, displeased that the Jin general Yu Liang was planning an attack against Later Zhao, Shi Hu acted first, sending his adopted grandson Shi Min to attack the borders with Jin, pillaging the border region and capturing Zhucheng (邾城, in modern Huanggang, Hubei), ending Yu's hopes of a northern campaign.

In 340, Shi Hu briefly entered into an alliance with Cheng Han's emperor Li Shou against Jin. However, after initially excitedly wishing to attack Jin, Li Shou cancelled his plan after contrary counsel by Gong Zhuang (龔壯), and the alliance did not come to anything.

== Late reign ==
In 342, Shi Hu continued a large number of construction projects, and further ordered major conscriptions, with plans to attack not only Jin but also Former Liang and Former Yan. The people were greatly burdened, and the officials took the chances of these projects to engage in corruption. The people were described of being so troubled that many committed suicide. In 344, after believing the astrologer Zhao Lan (趙攬) that a campaign would bring ill fortune, cancelled the campaign plans.

In 346, the Later Zhao generals Wang Zhuo and Ma Qiu attacked Former Liang with intent to conquer it, but after some initial successes, they were repelled by the Former Liang general Xie Ai. Another attack by Ma in 347 was also repelled by Xie.

Later in 347, believing a Buddhist monk's words that the Hu (胡, broad term encompassing non-Han) were about to lose their power to the Han and that the Han needed to be suppressed, further forced the Han men to engage in great labor.

In 348, the conflict between Shi Xuan and Shi Tao came to a horrible resolution. After a dispute over Shi Tao's building of a palace named Xuanguang Palace (宣光殿) -- since that name violated the naming taboo on Shi Xuan's name—Shi Xuan assassinated Shi Tao and considered assassinating Shi Hu as well. Shi Hu quickly suspected Shi Xuan, and his suspicions were fanned by that Shi Xuan showed no sign of mourning for Shi Tao. He detained Shi Xuan and arrested his followers, discovering the assassination plot. He planned to execute Shi Xuan, despite opposition from the Buddhist monk Fu Tucheng, whose prophecies he had respected greatly and who had predicted that Shi Xuan's death would bring great disaster on the empire. Indeed, he carried out a most cruel execution of Shi Xuan. Shi Xuan was placed near a wooden platform with a ladder leading up to it. His hairs and tongue were then pulled out, and then he was dragged up the ladder onto the platform. A rope was threaded through his pierced jaw, and then he was hoisted onto a wooden pyre. His hands and feet were then cut off, his eyes gouged out, and his abdomen sliced open and entrails allowed to flow out—as how Shi Tao appeared at his death. Then, a great fire was set on the pyre, and Shi Xuan was burned to death. This did not quell Shi Hu's anger, and he ordered the ashes to be scattered among the famous roads, allowing people, horses, and carriages to trample them. Shi Xuan's mother Empress Du was reduced to commoner status, and Shi Xuan's wife, concubines, and sons were all executed, including his youngest, whom Shi Hu was holding in his arms and was considering pardoning—but the executioner grabbed the child out of Shi Hu's arms and executed him. Shi Hu, shocked by his young grandson's death, grew ill. Shi Xuan's subordinates were executed and dismembered as well, and threw the bodies into the Zhang River, and the crown prince's guards were exiled to Liang Province (涼州, modern eastern Gansu).

Later that year, Shi Hu considered a new heir. Of his sons, Shi Bin (石斌) the Duke of Yan and Shi Zun the Duke of Pengcheng were considered the most capable, but under the advice of Zhang Chai, who understood Shi Hu's fear of yet another son rebelling and took advantage of it by suggesting that the reasons why his prior crown princes rebelled was because their mothers were of low birth, Shi Hu instead give title to his youngest son Shi Shi the Duke of Qi crown prince, and his mother Consort Liu the youngest daughter of the Former Zhao emperor Liu Yao, empress.

In spring 349, Shi Hu claimed the title of emperor and promoted all of his duke sons to princes. He soon however had to face a major rebellion—by former Crown Prince Xuan's guard captain Liang Du (梁犢), whose men were driven by desperation after finding out that they were not covered by the general pardon that Shi Hu issued when he took imperial title. They defeated every army sent to oppose them, until the Qiang chief Yao Yizhong was able to defeat them. Yao took the opportunity to try to persuade Shi Hu that it was unwise to have an heir so young, but although Shi Hu honored Yao greatly, he did not listen to Yao.

In summer 349, Shi Hu was near death, and he ordered that Shi Zun and Shi Bin be made regents for Shi Shi. This interfered with Empress Liu's and Zhang Chai's plans to take over the government, and they issued false edicts imprisoning Shi Bin and sending Shi Zun away. As Shi Hu grew closer to death, Shi Bin was put to death. After he died, Shi Shi took the throne, but after just 33 days was deposed by Shi Zun, who was then deposed by another son of Shi Hu, Shi Jian the Prince of Yiyang. Shi Jian then fell under the control of Shi Min, and by 350 Shi Min had killed Shi Jian and massacred most Jie and hu people, changed his family name back to his father's original Ran (冉), and usurped the throne. Another son of Shi Hu's, Shi Zhi, would claim imperial title and try to reestablish Later Zhao, but by 351 he was dead as well. Shi Hu's empire and people were destroyed, just two years after his death.

== Personal information ==
- Father
  - Koumi (寇覓), posthumously honored as Emperor Xiao, distant nephew of Shi Le's father Zhouhezhu (周曷朱). His grandfather's name was Beixie (㔨邪)
- Wives
  - Lady Guo, sister of the general Guo Rong (郭榮)
  - Lady Cui
  - Empress Zheng Yingtao (given title and deposed 337, killed by Ran Min 349), mother of Princes Sui and Zun
  - Empress Du (given title 337, deposed 348), mother of Princes Xuan and Tao
  - Empress Liu, daughter of Liu Yao (given title 348, killed by Shi Zun 349), mother of Prince Shi
- Children
  - Shi Sui (石邃), initially the Prince of Qi (given title 330), later the Crown Prince of Wei (given title 333), later the Crown Prince (given title and executed 337)
  - Shi Xuan (石宣), initially the Prince of Hejian (given title 333), later the Crown Prince (given title 337, executed 348)
  - Shi Tao (石韜), initially the Prince of Le'an (given title 333), later the Duke of Qin (given title 337, assassinated by Shi Xuan 348)
  - Shi Chong (石冲), Prince of Pei (forced to commit suicide by Shi Zun 349)
  - Shi Zun (石遵), initially the Prince of Qi (given title 333), later the Duke of Pengcheng (given title 337), later the Prince of Pengcheng (given title 349), later emperor
  - Shi Jian (石鑒), initially the Prince of Dai (given title 333), later the Duke of Yiyang (given title 337), later the Prince of Yiyang (given title 349), later emperor
  - Shi Bao (石苞), initially the Prince of Leping (given title 333), later the Duke of Leping (given title 337), later the Prince of Leping (given title and executed by Shi Jian 349)
  - Shi Bin (石斌), initially the Prince of Pingyuan (given title 330), later the Prince of Zhangwu (given title 333), later the Duke of Yan (given title 337), later the Prince of Yan (given title and executed by Empress Liu 349)
  - Shi Ting (石挺), the Prince of Liang (given title 330, killed in battle by Guo Quan (郭權) 333)
  - Shi Zhi (石祇), initially the Prince of Xinxing, later emperor
  - Shi Kun (石琨), the Prince of Ruyin (executed by Jin 352)
  - Shi Shi (石世), initially the Duke of Qi, later the Crown Prince (given title 348), later emperor

Emperor Wu of (Later) Zhao House of Shi Born: 295 Died: 349
Regnal titles
Preceded by Shi Hong	Emperor of Later Zhao; 334–349	Succeeded by Shi Shi
Titles in pretence
Preceded by Shi Hong	— TITULAR — Emperor of China; 334–349; Reason for succession failure: Sixteen Kingdoms	Succeeded by Shi Shi
