= Shi Shi (emperor) =

Shi Shi 石世

Emperor of Later Zhao
- Reign: 349
- Predecessor: Shi Hu
- Successor: Shi Zun
- Born: 339
- Died: 349
Names
- Shi Shi (石世)
Era name and dates
- Tàiníng (太寧): 349
- House: Shi
- Dynasty: Later Zhao
- Father: Shi Hu

Shi Shi (Chinese: 石世; 339–349) was briefly (for 33 days) the emperor of the Jie-led Later Zhao dynasty of China following his father Shi Hu's death in 349. In the Chinese annals, he is sometimes referred to by his title after removal as an Emperor, Prince of Qiao (譙王).

Shi Shi was Shi Hu's youngest son, by his third empress, Empress Liu, the daughter of Han Zhao's last emperor Liu Yao. In 348, after Shi Hu had executed his second crown prince Shi Xuan (石宣) for having assassinated his brother Shi Tao (石韜), he considered whom to make crown prince, and although Shi Shi was the youngest, Shi Hu's official Zhang Chai was able to convince him that he needed to create a crown prince whose mother did not come from low birth. Empress Liu and Zhang then planned to control the government after Shi Hu's death.

As Shi Hu neared death in summer 349, although Shi Hu had initially intended that his sons and Shi Shi's older brothers Shi Zun, the Prince of Pengcheng, and Shi Bin (石斌), the Prince of Yan, serve as co-regents, Empress Liu and Zhang managed to forge edicts ordering Shi Zun to go to Guanzhong and execute Shi Bin. After Shi Hu's death, Shi Shi succeeded to the throne. Empress Dowager Liu became regent, and she shared power with Zhang. Unhappy with this development, Shi Zun, with a number of generals supporting him, revolted and advanced on the capital Yecheng, killing Zhang and detaining Empress Dowager Liu and Shi Shi. He then forged an edict by Empress Dowager Liu deposing Shi Shi and giving himself the throne. He reduced Shi Shi to a Prince of Qiao, and Empress Dowager Liu to a Princess Dowager of Qiao, but then executed them. Shi Shi was just 10 when he died.

== Personal information ==
- Father
  - Shi Hu (Emperor Wu)
- Mother
  - Empress Liu

Prince of Qiao House of Shi Born: 339 Died: 349
Regnal titles
Preceded by Shi Hu	Emperor of Later Zhao; 349 with Empress Dowager Liu (349)	Succeeded by Shi Zun
Titles in pretence
Preceded by Shi Hu	— TITULAR — Emperor of China; 349; Reason for succession failure: Sixteen Kingdoms	Succeeded by Shi Zun
