= Later Zhao =

Jie state (319–351) during the Sixteen Kingdoms period

Zhao 趙
- 319–351
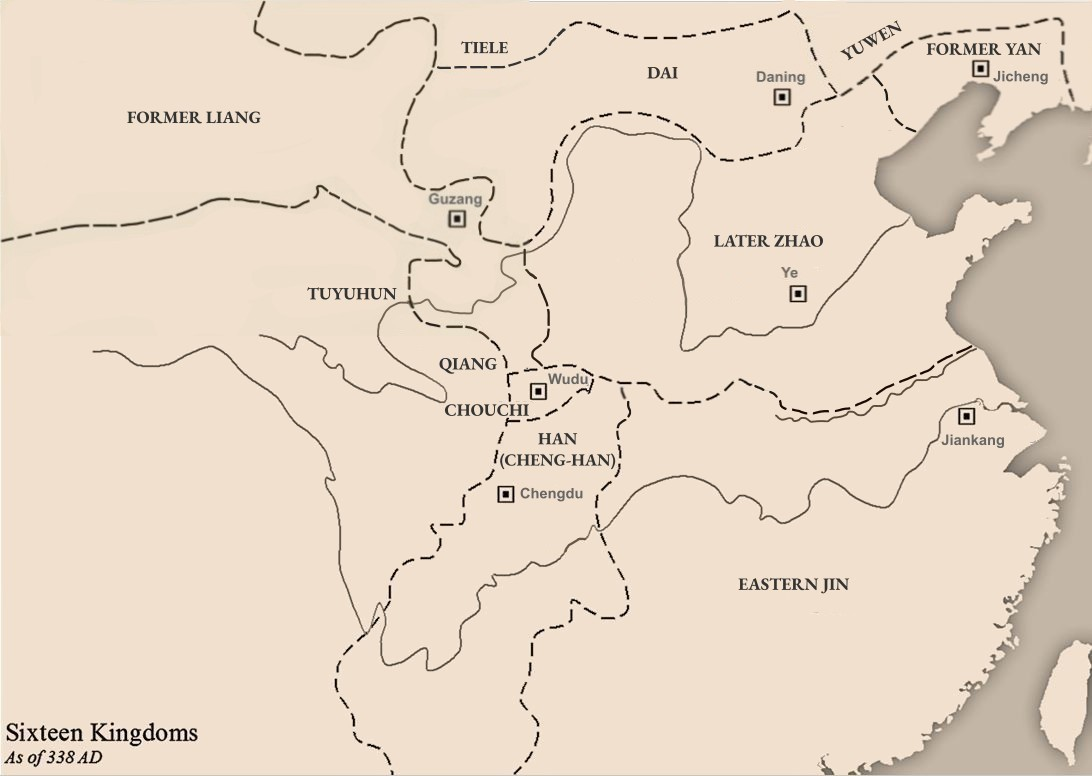
- Later Zhao in northern China
- Capital: Xiangguo (319–335, 350–351); Yecheng (335–350)
- Common languages: Jie
- Government: Monarchy
- Emperor
  - 319–333: Shi Le
  - 333–334: Shi Hong
  - 334–349: Shi Hu
  - 349: Shi Shi
  - 349: Shi Zun
  - 349–350: Shi Jian
  - 350–351: Shi Zhi
- History
  - Established: 319
  - Destruction of Han-Zhao: 329
  - Shi Le's claim of imperial title: 330
  - Shi Hu's seizing the throne from Shi Hong: 335
  - Ran Min's establishment of Ran Wei: 350
  - Disestablished: 351

Area
- 329 est.: 2,500,000 km^{2} (970,000 sq mi)
Preceded by
Han-Zhao
Jin dynasty (266–420)
Succeeded by
Ran Wei
Former Qin
Former Yan
Jin dynasty (266–420)
Duan Qi
- Today part of: China

Zhao, briefly known officially as Wei (衛) in 350 AD, known in historiography as the Later Zhao (simplified Chinese: 后赵; traditional Chinese: 後趙; pinyin: Hòu Zhào; 319–351) or Shi Zhao (石趙), was a dynasty of China ruled by the Shi family of Jie ethnicity during the Sixteen Kingdoms period. Among the Sixteen Kingdoms, the Later Zhao was the second in territorial size to the Former Qin dynasty that once unified northern China under Fu Jian. In historiography, it is given the prefix of "Later" to distinguish it with the Han-Zhao or Former Zhao, which changed its name from "Han" to "Zhao" just before the Later Zhao was founded.

When the Later Zhao was founded by former Han-Zhao general Shi Le, the capital was at Xiangguo, but in 335 Shi Hu moved the capital to Yecheng, where it would remain for the rest of the state's history (except for Shi Zhi's brief attempt to revive the state at Xiangguo). After defeating the Han-Zhao in 329, the Later Zhao ruled a significant portion of northern China and vassalized the Former Liang and Dai; only the Former Yan in Liaoning remained fully out of their control. For roughly twenty years, they maintained a stalemate with the Eastern Jin dynasty in the south before their rapid collapse in 349 following the death of Shi Hu.

== History ==
=== Background ===
After the fall of the Southern Xiongnu in the 3rd century AD, their descendants in northern China underwent a process of miscegenation and assimilation, becoming part of various "mixed Hu" (雜胡; zahu) groups. A distinct group among these Hu people were known as the Jie, who mainly resided in Bing province in modern-day Shanxi. In 303, a great famine broke out in Shanxi that displaced many of the local Jie and other Hu communities. To fund his military for the ongoing civil war, the provincial inspector had them captured and sold into slavery, scattering them throughout the eastern regions of Hebei and Shandong.

Among those captured was the Jie chieftain, Shi Le, who was sold to a wealthy merchant in Shandong. Upon attaining his freedom in 305, he became a bandit and raised a personal army, soon becoming a prominent rebel leader in the uprisings against Jin. After being routed in 307, Shi Le attached himself to the King of Han, Liu Yuan, a Chuge-Xiongnu leader who had also rebelled in Shanxi. Under the Han, Shi Le quickly rose through the ranks, attracting both Chinese and non-Chinese rebels to his cause. He was also effectively an independent warlord, as the Han court was unable to exercise real authority beyond Shanxi. Shi Le and his allies raided the counties and commanderies of the North China Plain. In 311, his forces annihilated the 100,000 strong imperial Jin army at the Battle of Ningping, subsequently leading to the fall of Luoyang.

Shi Le's influence continued to expand unimpeded by the Han emperor and government. In 312, after years of leading a roving army, he was convinced by his Han Chinese advisor, Zhang Bin to establish a base at the city of Xiangguo. He then went on to eliminate the Jin governors, Wang Jun and Liu Kun, controlling much of the North China Plain. In 318, the emperor and his family at Pingyang were slaughtered by the consort kin, Jin Zhun in a coup. Shi Le promptly formed an alliance with Liu Yao, a member of the imperial family who held the Guanzhong Basin, and jointly put down the disturbance. Liu Yao was acclaimed the new emperor, and initially promised to bestow Shi Le the title of King of Zhao. However, believing that Shi Le had grown too powerful, he soon rescinded by killing Shi Le's envoy and retreating west to his base at Chang'an.

=== Reign of Shi Le ===
In 319, Shi Le declared independence by proclaiming himself the King of Zhao. As Liu Yao had changed his state's name from Han to Zhao not long prior, historians distinguish Shi Le's state as the "Later Zhao" to Liu Yao's "Former Zhao" (or Han-Zhao). In his early reign, Shi Le expanded eastwards while Liu Yao dealt with matters in the west. By 323, he defeated Duan Pidi, one of the last remaining Jin powers in the north and conquered Shandong from the warlord, Cao Ni. War between the two Zhao states soon broke out, and in 328, Shi Le and Liu Yao led their armies to face each other in the pivotal Battle of Luoyang. Liu Yao was captured during the battle and later executed, while his remaining forces in the Guanzhong Basin were destroyed the following year. With the Former Zhao's demise and the Jin driven out to the south, the Later Zhao thus asserted their hegemony over northern China. The far reaches of the Former Liang, Dai and Liaoxi had also offered their nominal submissions, leaving only the Murong tribe in Liaodong uninfluenced as they remained loyal to the Eastern Jin court at Jiankang.

To consolidate his rule, Shi Le enacted several policies and reforms with the help of Zhang Bin and other Chinese scholar-officials. His government re-introduced the Nine Ranks System, promoted agriculture and emphasized Confucian education. He also continued the Han-Zhao's separate governance system between the Han and Hu people through the Chanyu Platform, whose role was to manage the affairs of the tribes and hold command over the military. The word "Hu" was formally banned, as these people were instead given the more dignified status of “Guoren” (國人; "Compatriots"), while the Han Chinese were referred to as "Zhaoren" (趙人; "Zhao people"). Captured people from his conquests were relocated around the capital region to better control them and restore agriculture output. Outside of the capital region, most of the Chinese population had found refuge in various fortified manors in the countryside during the preceding decades of chaos. Shi Le legitimized the lords of these manors by granting them officials titles while allowing them to retain most of their autonomy. Buddhism was also given a platform to grow, as Shi Le appointed the Kuchean monk, Fotu Cheng to a privileged position within his court.

Shi Le and his family had a unique practice of adopting people from into their clan. The earliest example was Shi Hu, a distant cousin who was adopted by Shi Le's father during their tribal years. Shi Le continued this practice after ascending the throne, taking in people from various ethnicities. These adopted relatives, especially Shi Hu, became important princes and military commanders. Near the end of his reign, Shi Le prepared his biological son, Shi Hong to take the throne in accordance with the Chinese rule of succession and hand-picked his circle of retainers. However, Shi Hu was enraged by Shi Le's decision, believing that his vast contributions to the state and the fact that Shi Le had once promised him the throne gave him a legitimate claim to the succession.

=== Reign of Shi Hu ===
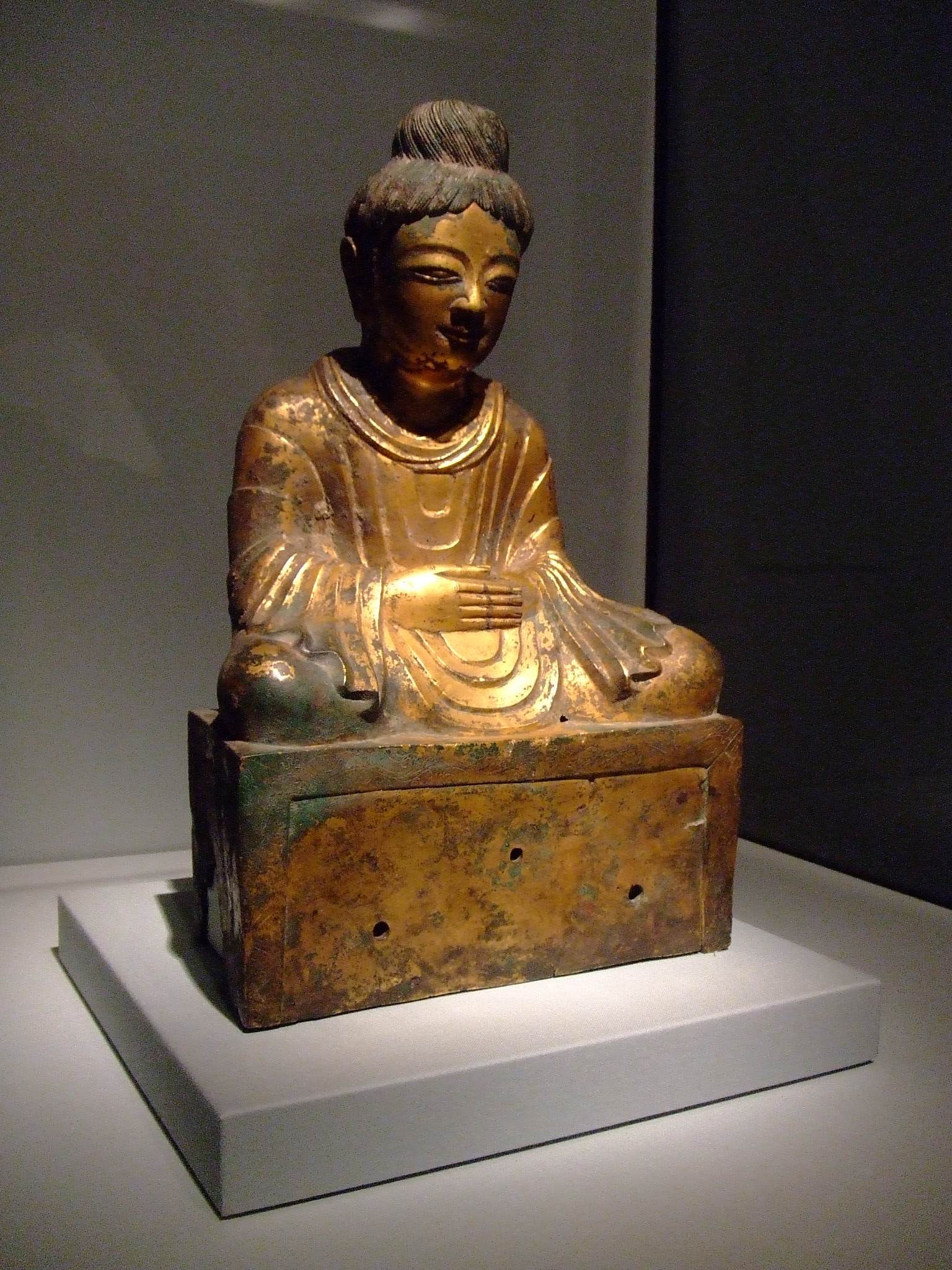
A bronze Buddha statue created under the Later Zhao in 338. It is the earliest known Buddha sculpture produced in China.

In 333, Shi Le died and was succeeded by Shi Hong. Almost immediately, Shi Hu launched a coup and took over the government, facing very little resistance from most of the Zhao gentry and military. Shi Le's family and allies were swiftly wiped out by Shi Hu. In 334, he took the throne by forcing Shi Hong to abdicate before also having him executed. When he first ascended, Shi Hu took the title of Regnant Heavenly King and later elevated to Heavenly King in 337. He also moved the capital from Xiangguo to his nearby headquarters at Ye in 335.

Records describe Shi Hu as a violent tyrant who spent his time indulging in women and alcohol. At the expense of the Chinese commoners, he forced many of them into corvée to undertake his grand building projects in Ye and seized their women to serve in his harem. Meanwhile, he showed exceptional leniency towards his chief ministers and generals, rarely punishing them and thereby winning their loyalty. He carried on Shi Le's policy of relocating people to live around the capital, most prominently the Di and Qiang people of the Guanzhong plains, who formed a significant part of his armed forces at Fangtou (枋頭, in modern Hebi, Henan) and Shetou (灄頭; in modern Zaoqiang County, Hebei) respectively.

Shi Hu also continued to show reverence to Fotu Cheng. In 335, Shi Hu considered banning commoners from practicing the religion, as he believed that many of them had joined Buddhist monasteries simply to avoid his military drafts and corvée duties. However, after a minister proposed that the religion should be banned altogether, Shi Hu changed his mind, stating that since he and the Buddha were both foreigners, they were worthy of the same respect. From then on, Shi Hu granted his subjects the freedom to practice all religions. Under Fotu Cheng, more than 800 monasteries were established in the Later Zhao, and his disciples such as Dao'an, Zhu Faya and Zhu Fatai later spread his teachings to the Eastern Jin.

Shi Hu had ambitions to expand the state and heavily conscripted his subjects, but his campaigns yielded minimal success. In 338, he carried out a joint campaign with the Murong-led Former Yan to conquer the Duan tribe in Liaoxi. After the campaign, he turned on Yan but was defeated in the Battle of Jicheng. In 339, provoked by Eastern Jin movements along the border, he sent his generals to launch an early attack, capturing a few cities before being forced to withdraw. In 346, he invaded the Former Liang but was repelled, although his forces managed to capture Liang's territory south of the Yellow River.

His reign was also troubled by succession crises that would lead to the empire's downfall. His first crown prince was his eldest son Shi Sui (石邃), who was notably cruel and allegedly indulged in cannibalism. As he began to lose favour from his father, he attempted to directly seize the throne by killing Shi Hu but ultimately failed, leading to the massacre of his family and partisans. The second crown prince, Shi Xuan (石宣), was the eldest through another wife, but he too was not liked by Shi Hu, who instead favoured his younger brother. Nonetheless, Shi Hu had the pair work closely together, but in 349, Shi Xuan had his brother murdered and tried to kill his father as well. When his plot was discovered, Shi Hu had him, his family and followers all executed in a brutal showing. That same year, Shi Hu fell seriously ill, and fearing another coup, he appointed the 10 year old Shi Shi as his last crown prince and entrusted him to a regent and empress dowager, a decision that displeased many of his princes and generals. Before his death, he also elevated his title to Emperor of Zhao.

=== Ran Min disturbance and fall ===
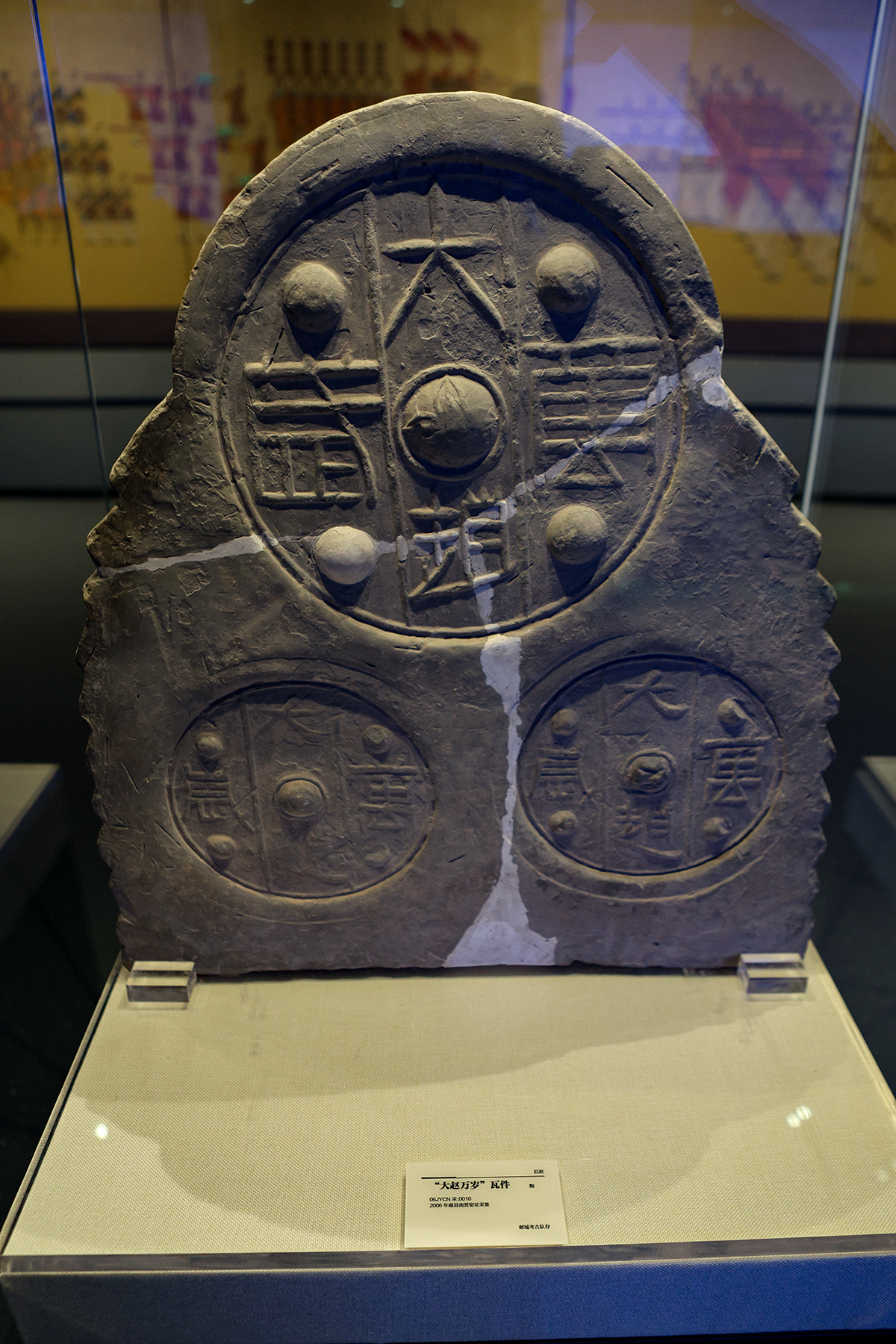
A roof tile component from the city of Ye during the Later Zhao with the inscription, "Long live the Great Zhao" (大趙萬歲).

When Shi Hu died not long after, Shi Shi was immediately challenged upon his ascension. His half-brother, Shi Zun conspired with the generals to depose him, and among them was Shi Hu's adopted Chinese grandson, Shi Min. Shi Min was a powerful commander and a favourite of Shi Hu, who previously took in his father as a son from the Ran (冉) family. To convince him into joining the plot, Shi Zun vowed to make Shi Min his Crown Prince, much akin to Shi Le's promise to Shi Hu for the throne. Just a month into his reign, Shi Zun's forces overthrew Shi Shi at Ye. However, after ascending the throne, Shi Zun reneged on his promise and appointed another nephew as his heir. Shi Zun even planned to assassinate Shi Min, but when the plan leaked, Shi Min led his troops to depose him. He installed Shi Zun's half-brother, Shi Jian to the throne, but real power in Ye was held by himself and his ally, Li Nong. At the old capital of Xiangguo, another son of Shi Hu, Shi Zhi, began rallying a coalition to fight Shi Min.

While controlling Shi Jian, Shi Min survived three attempts on his life by his family and their Jie followers. Seeing that he could not trust the tribespeople in Ye, he decreed an infamous culling order, calling on his Han Chinese subjects to kill any Jie or Hu person they find. Shi Min personally led his army to facilitate the massacre within the city, while also ordering his generals to purge their armies. The Jie and Hu were identified by their high noses and full beards, but many of the people killed were also mistakenly-identified Han Chinese. In total, around 200,000 people were killed.

Shi Min killed Shi Jian and declared himself Emperor of Wei in 350, changing his name to Ran Min. Shi Zhi proclaimed himself the new Emperor of Zhao in response, but by that point, the empire had all but collapsed. The Di general at Fangtou, Fu Hong led his forces west to occupy the Guanzhong, where his son Fu Jiàn founded the Former Qin dynasty in 351. The Xianbei general, Duan Kan, also founded his short-lived state of Duan Qi in Shandong. From the northeast, the Former Yan began their invasion, while the Eastern Jin launched a series of northern expeditions to reclaim lost territory from the south. For most of his reign, Shi Zhi was besieged at Xiangguo by Ran Min. He was forced to make an alliance with the Former Yan and demoted his own title to King of Zhao. Despite eventually lifting the siege, he and his family were soon betrayed and slaughtered by his own general in 351. The last members of the Shi clan fled to the Eastern Jin for refuge, but were instead put to death upon their arrival.

== Cultural influences ==
Xie Fei and Wei Mengbian were two mechanical engineers under the Later Zhao who built a south-pointing chariot (also called south-pointing carriage), a directional compass vehicle that apparently did not use magnetic principle, but was operated by use of differential gears (which apply an equal amount of torque to driving wheels rotating at different speeds), or a similar angular differential principle. For the great ingenuity shown in the construction of the device, Shi Hu granted Xie Fei the noble title of hou without land possessions and rewarded him generously.

== Rulers of the Later Zhao ==
Temple name	Posthumous name	Personal name	Durations of reign	Era names
Gaozu	Ming	Shi Le	319–333	Zhaowang (趙王) 319–328; Taihe (太和 Tàihé) 328–330; Jianping (建平) 330–333
–		Shi Hong	333–334	Yanxi (延熙) 334
Taizu	Wu	Shi Hu	334–349	Jianwu (建武) 335–349; Taining (太寧) 349
–		Shi Shi	349	–
–		Shi Zun	349	–
–		Shi Jian	349–350	Qinglong (青龍) 350
–		Shi Zhi	350–351	Yongning (永寧) 351

== Rulers family tree ==
Later Zhao monarchs family tree

Adoption
Shi Xie 石邪	Shi Beixie 石㔨邪
Shi Zhouhezhu 石周曷朱	Shi Koumi 寇覓
Shi Le 石勒 (274–333); Ming 明 r. 319–333	Shi Hu 石虎 (295–349); Wu 武 (r. 334–349)	Ran Long 冉隆
Shi Hong 石弘; 314–335; r. 333–334	Shi Zun 石遵 (d./r. 349)	Shi Jian 石鑒 d. 350; r. 349–350	Shi Zhi 石祗 d. 351; r. 350–351	Shi Shi 石世; 339–349; r.349	Ran Zhan 冉瞻 (299?–328)
Ran Min 冉閔 (d. 352) of Ran Wei (冉魏) state r. 350–352
Ran Zhi 冉智 (d. 354) of Ran Wei (冉魏) state r. 352

== See also ==
- Jie people
- Five Barbarians
- Fotu Cheng
- Canjunxi
- Xie Fei (inventor)
- Ran Wei–Later Zhao War
