= Ye (Hebei) =

Ancient Chinese city in modern Hebei

Coordinates: 36.2748°N 114.4002°E

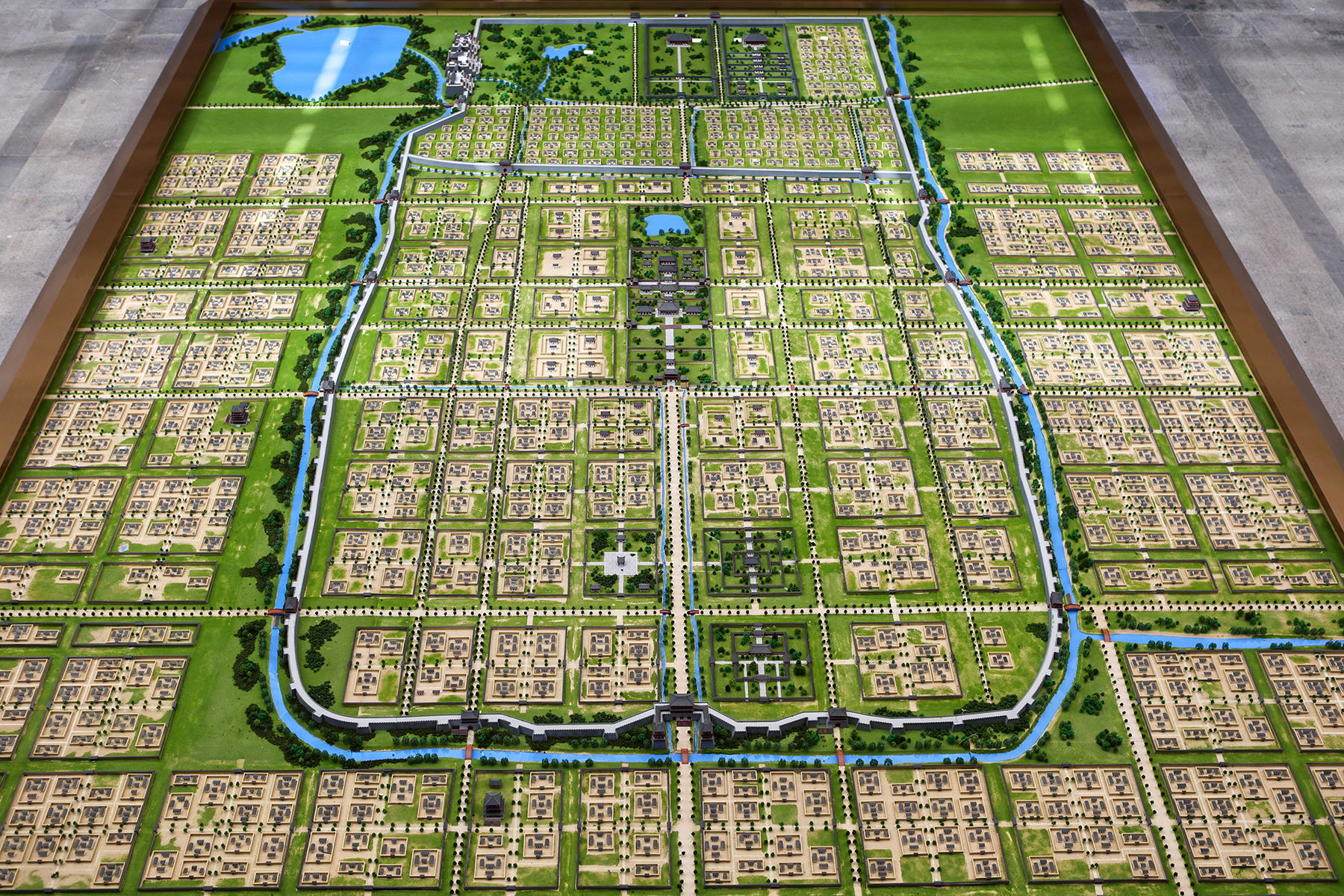
Model of Ye city in the Yecheng Museum, Hebei

Ye or Yecheng (simplified Chinese: 邺城; traditional Chinese: 鄴城; pinyin: Yèchéng; Wade–Giles: Yeh^{4}-ch'eng^{2}) was an ancient Chinese city located in what is now Linzhang County, Handan, Hebei province and neighbouring Anyang, Henan province.

Ye was first built in the Spring and Autumn period by Duke Huan of Qi, and by the time of the Warring States period the city belonged to the state of Wei. During the Han dynasty, Ye was the seat of Wei Commandery and an important regional center. Following the collapse of Han rule, Ye served as the military headquarters of the warlords Yuan Shao and Cao Cao. Under the latter's rule, Ye transformed into a political and economic hub of northeastern China during the Three Kingdoms period, and during the Sixteen Kingdoms and Northern dynasties, the city served as the capital for the Later Zhao, Ran Wei, Former Yan, Eastern Wei and Northern Qi dynasties.

== History ==
In 204, Cao Cao wrestled the city of Ye from Yuan Shao's son Yuan Shang. As the preceding battle of Ye had destroyed the inner city, Cao Cao set about rebuilding the city in the mold of an imperial capital. He initiated a number of works in Ye, digging canals in and around the city to improve irrigation and drainage, building the Hall of Civil Splendour (文昌殿) which was to become the centerpiece of Ye's palace complex, and erecting the Bronze Bird Terrace in 210 that became much-celebrated in Chinese poetry. Cao Cao's impact on Ye was so extensive that he alone, more than any ruler of the city before and after, is associated with the city of Ye in the Chinese cultural memory. After Cao Cao's grandson Cao Huan was forced to abdicate to Sima Yan in February 266, Cao Huan was relocated to Ye where he lived for the rest of his life.

During the latter half of the Western Jin dynasty, Ye was the command post for the Prince of Chengdu, Sima Ying in the War of the Eight Princes. The city was sacked by the Xianbei in 304, and again by rebels in 307. In 312, the ethnic Jie warlord, Shi Le, after years of leading a roaming army, was advised by his Chinese aide, Zhang Bin to establish Ye as his main base. However, as Ye was still occupied by Jin remnants at the time, they opted for the nearby city of Xiangguo instead, which later became the first capital of the Later Zhao dynasty. The Zhao capital was eventually shifted to Ye in 335 during the reign of Shi Hu, who carried out extensive construction work and renovation on the city's palaces and architecture.

After Shi Hu's death in 349, his adopted grandson, Ran Min, seized control of Ye in a coup, where he soon founded the short-lived Ran Wei state in 350. Two years later, his empire was destroyed by the forces of Murong Jun, ruler of the Xianbei-led Former Yan dynasty, who adopted Ye as his capital in 357. Ye would remain the Yan's seat of government until their fall to the Former Qin in 370. As the Qin collapsed following the Battle of Fei River in 383, a prince of the Former Yan, Murong Chui restored his family's state as the Later Yan and attempted to reclaim Ye. However, by the time the city was recaptured in 386, much of Ye had been devastated after a grueling year of siege, so Murong Chui decided to settle his court at Zhongshan (中山, in modern Baoding, Hebei) in the north.

In the 490s, Emperor Xiaowen of Northern Wei moved his capital from Pingcheng (平城, in modern Datong, Shanxi) to Luoyang. This move was not welcomed by all. Antagonism grew between Xiaowen and his sinicized court and those who preferred to cling to the traditional Tuoba tribal ways, and it only increased with further changes calling for the abandonment of Tuoba dress and names. Eventually, under the leadership of Gao Huan (a Chinese general who was Tuoba in his ways and "outlook"), the sinicization-dissenting 'northern garrisons' mutinied and captured Luoyang in 534. "At three days' notice, its inhabitants were required to accompany Gao Huan to his own base, the city of Ye...where he declared himself the first Eastern Wei emperor." (Note: In Chinese historiography, Gao Huan was regarded as a posthumous emperor as he did not claim the imperial title à la Cao Cao; the Eastern Wei had a puppet emperor (Emperor Xiaojing of Eastern Wei) and it was Gao's son Gao Yang who claimed the imperial title and established Northern Qi.) "During most of the sixth century Ho-pei (Hebei) was the heart of an independent state with its capital at Yeh [Ye]...." It remained the capital of the Eastern Wei dynasty and the Northern Qi dynasty until 580. At that time Ye was being used by a resistance force led by Yuchi Jiong, which was defeated by Yang Jian, founder of the Sui dynasty, and the city was razed to the ground.

Following this event, the inhabitants of Ye were relocated to Anyang, just 18km to the south. Anyang soon inherited the old city's function as the political center of Hebei, with many people even referring to Anyang as Ye. Some scholars, such as Ku Chi-kuang reported that the Hebei region continued to harbour separatist sympathies into the Tang dynasty. It was the region from which An Lushan launched his rebellion during the reign of the Tang Emperor Xuanzong, and Ye was briefly used as a base for the rebels under An Qingxu in 758–759.

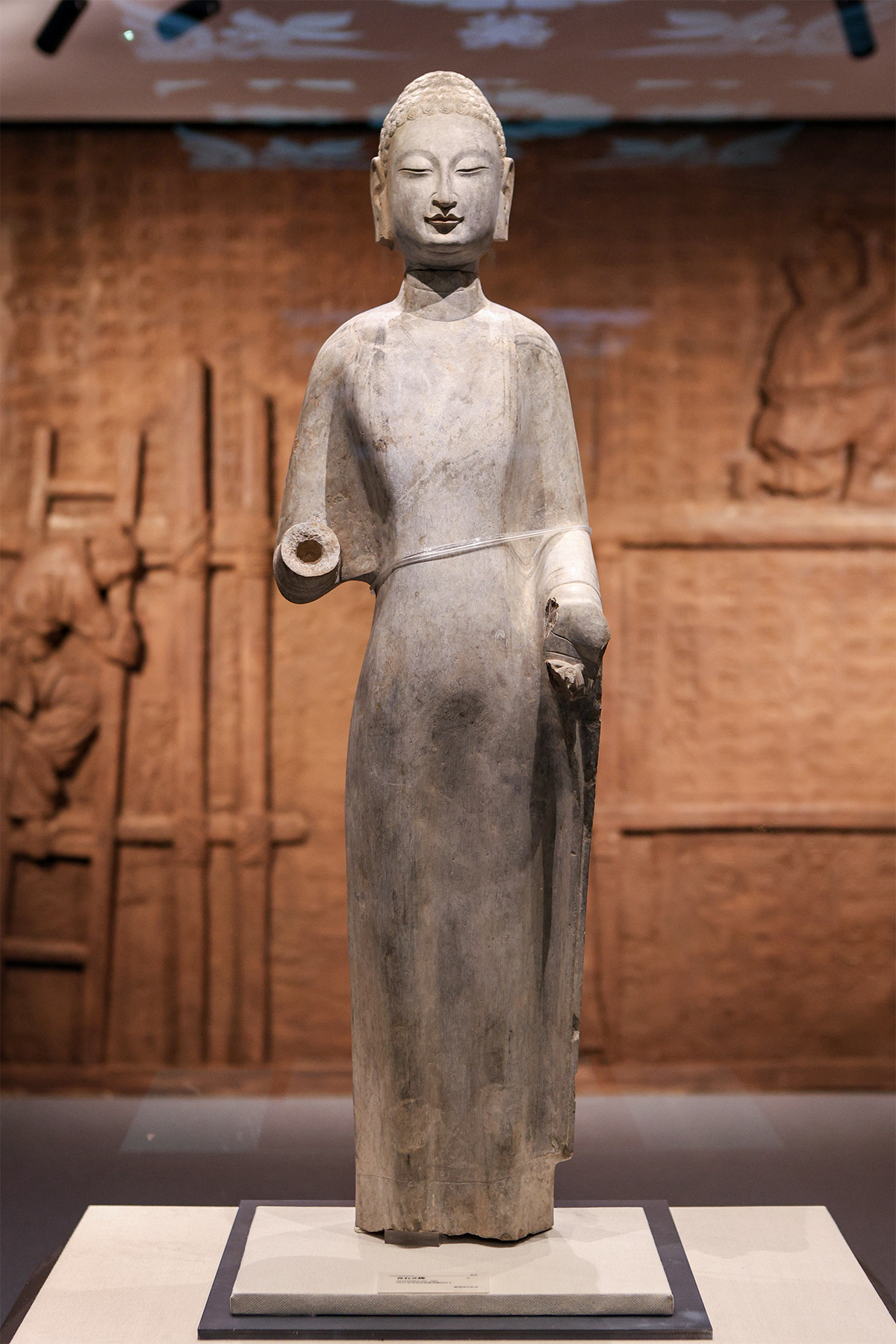
Standing Buddha statue carved in bluestone unearthed in the Ye city site, Northern Qi dynasty. Housed in the Yecheng Museum.

Extensive excavations of the city have been made in recent years, allowing Chinese historians to make detailed plans of the site. In 2012, archaeologists unearthed nearly 3,000 Buddha statues during a dig outside Ye. Most of the statues are made of white marble and limestone, and could date back to the Eastern Wei and Northern Qi dynasties (534–577 CE).

A community of merchant Sogdians resided in Northern Qi-era Ye.
