= Geyi =

Method of explaining Sanskrit Buddhist terms

Chinese name
- Traditional Chinese: 格義
- Simplified Chinese: 格义
Transcriptions
Standard Mandarin
- Hanyu Pinyin: géyì
- Wade–Giles: ko-i
Yue: Cantonese
- Yale Romanization: gaak yih

Korean name
- Hangul: 격의
Transcriptions
- Revised Romanization: gyeogui
- McCune–Reischauer: kyŏgŭi

Japanese name
- Kanji: 格義
- Hiragana: かくぎ
Transcriptions
- Revised Hepburn: kakugi

Geyi ("categorizing concepts") originated as a 3rd-century Chinese Buddhist method for explaining lists of Sanskrit terms from the Buddhist canon with comparable lists from Chinese classics; but many 20th-century scholars of Buddhism misconstrued geyi "matching concepts" as a supposed method of translating Sanskrit technical terminology with Chinese Daoist vocabulary (such as rendering Śūnyatā "emptiness" with Wu 無 "without"). This reputed geyi "matching concepts" or "matching meanings" definition is ubiquitous in modern reference works, including academic articles, textbooks on Buddhism, dictionaries, encyclopedias, and Web-based resources.

Victor H. Mair, Professor of Chinese Language and Literature at the University of Pennsylvania, has investigated geyi and found no historical evidence to support the translation hypothesis. Mair has discovered that geyi was a "highly ephemeral and not-very-successful attempt on the part of a small number of Chinese teachers to cope with the flood of numbered lists of categories, ideas and so forth (of which Indian thinkers were so much enamoured) that came to China in the wake of Buddhism". Misunderstanding of geyi, which Mair calls "pseudo-geyi," has distorted the History of Buddhism and History of Taoism; has misled countless students through "erroneous definitions and specious accounts" in otherwise generally reliable reference books; and perhaps worst of all, "has spawned an entire industry of fake philosophizing about the intellectual history of China", particularly that of the Six Dynasties period (220–598). This kind of scholarship seems to be perpetuated in the latest publications on the topic, which is apparently completely ignorant of Mair's study.

== Word semantics ==
The Chinese word géyì is a compound of two terms. Gé 格—a phono-semantic character (形聲字) written with the "wood radical" indicating "lattice; pattern" and a gě 各 phonetic indicator—is defined as: "noun ① lattice; grid; squares ② [linguistics] case; bound morpheme standard; pattern; style; verb resist; obstruct". Yì 義—written with yáng 𦍌 "sheep" over wǒ 我 "I; my" phonetic—is defined as: bound morpheme "① justice; righteousness ② chivalry; sense of honor ③ meaning; significance ④ human ties; relationship ⑤ adopted; adoptive ⑥ artificial; false ⑦ volunteer."

The common but inaccurate English translation of géyì is "matching concepts" or sometimes "matching meanings" in the imaginative scenario of early Sanskrit-Chinese "translationese". Besides the absence of historical proof (discussed below), there is a lack of linguistic evidence. While Chinese yì 義 commonly translates as "meaning; concept" (e.g., yìyì 意義 "meaning; sense; significance"), gé 格 never means "matching".

This Chinese character 格 has multiple pronunciations and many meanings. The Hanyu Da Cidian word dictionary 格 entry lists four different Modern Standard Chinese pronunciations (gé, luò, gē, hè), plus two special pronunciations (lù, hé), with a total of 42 definitions. The Hanyu Da Zidian character dictionary 格 entry lists the same six pronunciations, with a total of 33 definitions. Mair says, "Despite the plethora of definitions for this single graph, neither of these authoritative works offers a justification for rendering it as ‘matching’ (the closest they come is ‘to oppose [an enemy]’, but that is too remote to justify translating geyi as ‘matching meanings’)."

Mair compiled definitions of ge 格 from leading Modern Chinese dictionaries and semantically regrouped them as:

square/compartment/check/chequer (formed by crossed lines); lattice, grid; division; standard, pattern, rule; character, manner, style; impede, obstruct, resist, bar (designated by some dictionaries as a literary usage); hit, beat, fight; investigate, examine; case (grammatical).

Taking the gé in géyì to signify "classification; categorization", Mair explains the most of these meanings are derivable from the basic idea of a compartmentalized wooden framework in which sections are blocked off. Since not one Chinese dictionary defines gé as "matching" or "pairing", there is "no lexicographical warrant for the currently ubiquitous translation of geyi as "matching meanings". Mair concludes that "'matching' is simply an ad hoc, unsubstantiated rendering of the graph devised by modern scholars perplexed by its occurrence in the shadowy expression geyi".

== Classical usages ==
Geyi is an uncommon term within the Chinese classics. It primarily occurs 23 times in the Buddhist canon (Taishō Tripiṭaka edition), and many of these are repetitions. Geyi is not found in the Daozang Daoist Canon, the official Twenty-Four Histories, Zizhi Tongjian reference of Chinese historiography, Gujin Tushu Jicheng imperial encyclopedia, Siku Quanshu collection (with some 888 million characters), or comprehensive digital databases of classics. Mair explains: "It would appear that, after a few fleeting mentions during the Wei-Jin period (late third to fourth centuries), the term geyi was almost totally obliterated from Chinese intellectual discourse and consciousness until the twentieth century.".

The earliest source to mention geyi is the biography of Jin dynasty Buddhist Zhu Faya 竺法雅 or Faya (fl. late 3rd-century and early 4th-century), which is found Memoirs of Eminent Monks by Huijiao 慧皎 (497–554). Zhu Faya lived in Hejian and Hebei and was an older contemporary of Dao An (312–385) and Zhu Fatai (320–387).

(Zhu) Faya was a man of Hejian. He was of a staid, tolerant disposition. As a youth, he excelled at non-Buddhist studies, and when he grew up he became proficient in Buddhist doctrine. The sons of gentry families all attached themselves to him and requested that he teach them. At that time, the adherents who followed him were uniformly well-versed in secular works, but did not yet excel in Buddhist principles. Consequently, (Zhu Fa)ya, with Kang Falang and others, correlated the numerations of items (shishu 事數) in the sutras with non-Buddhist writings as instances of lively explication; this was called "categorizing concepts" (geyi). Thereupon, Vibhu (?), Tanxiang, and others also debated over the categorised concepts in order to instruct their disciples. (Zhu Fa)ya's manner was unrestrained and he excelled (in getting at) the crux (of the matter). He alternately lectured on secular works and Buddhist sutras. With Dao’an and Fatai, he often explained the doubtful points they had assembled, and together they exhausted the essentials of the sutras.

Huijiao authoritatively explains the original meaning of geyi as correlating Indian Buddhist shishu 事數 "enumerative categories (or categorized enumeration) of things/items, i.e., (technical) terms" with comparable material from Chinese sources. Shishu has two synonyms of fashu 法數 "categories of Buddhist concepts" and mingshu 名數 "numbered groups of Buddhist terms".

The Shishuo Xinyu, "New Account of Tales of the World", which contains historical anecdotes about the Eastern Jin period (when the geyi method began and ended), mentions shishu "enumerated items" in connection with the politician Yin Hao (d. 356).

When Yin Hao was dismissed and transferred to Tung-yang [in 353] he read a large number of Buddhist sutras, gaining a detailed understanding of them all. It was only when he came to places where items were enumerated that he did not understand. Whenever he chanced to see a monk, he would ask about the items he had noted down, end then they would become clear.

The Shishuo Xinyu commentary of Liu Jun 劉孝標 (462–521) gives examples of shishu categories such as the Four Noble Truths, Five Aggregates, Five Strengths, Seven Factors of Enlightenment, and Twelve Nidānas. Zhu Faya helped to develop geyi in an attempt to teach their Chinese students shishu-type sets of Buddhist technical terms, employing comparable lists from non-Buddhist texts.

The 4th-century Eastern Jin monastic Dao'an – mentioned above in Zhu Faya's biography about using geyi to teach Chinese Buddhists numerical lists of Sanskrit terms – was renowned as an early translator of and commentator on Buddhist scriptures. As a leader of the next generation of Chinese Buddhist teachers after Zhu Faya, Dao'an was the first recorded critic of the geyi method. His biography records that around 349, when Dao’an was living together with Sengxian 僧先 on Feilong Shan (Flying-Dragon Mountain, in modern Hebei),

(Dao)'an said, "The old 'categorized concepts' (geyi) of the past was often at odds with Buddhist principles." "We ought to analyze [the texts] carefreely [sic] [逍遙]," said Sengxian. "How are we permitted to dispute our predecessors?" (Dao)'an said, "In spreading and praising the [Buddhist] principles and doctrines, we should make them fitting and proper. When dharma-drums compete to resound, what [does it matter who comes] first [and who comes] later?"

Following Dao'an's repudiation, the experimental geyi technique became a short-lived phenomenon that lasted for no more than a generation. Thus, Mair notes, geyi "did not have time to develop into something more elaborate or important, as is often imagined by modern interpreters."

The Eastern Jin monk Sengrui (352–436) was a student of Dao'an, and became a principle translator working with Kumarajiva. Sengui's commentary to the Vimalakirti Sutra criticizes translators who tried using geyi to explain the Mahayana Buddhist Prajnaparamita "Perfection of Wisdom" sutras:

Since the Wind of Wisdom fanned eastward and the Word of the Dharma flowed forth in song, although it may be said that there were places [set up] for lecturing, the categorizing of concepts [employed in them] was pedantic and at odds with the original [sense of the Indian texts being discussed]; the Six Schools [of Prajñāpāramitā] were biased and did not touch [the truth].

The Liang dynasty monk Sengyou (445–518), who wrote a biography of Kumarajiva, censured the Yuezhi translators Zhi Qian (fl. 220–252) and Dharmarakṣa or Zhu Fahu (c. 233–310) for using geyi.

Since the Great Law covered the east, beginning in [the time] of Emperor Ming [58–75] of the [Later] Han and passing through the Wei [220–265] and the Jin [266–420], the [translated] sūtras (scriptures) and śāstras (treatises) that were produced gradually became numerous. Yet the [translations] produced by Zhi (Qian) and Zhu (Fahu) mostly [were plagued by] stagnant wording and categorized concepts.

Since the geyi method originated for exegesis of numbered lists and not translation, Sengyou's criticism of geyi implies that he only vaguely understood it.

Tang dynasty (618–907) Buddhist texts made some repetitive criticisms of geyi. Daoxuan (596–667) mentioned geyi twice in contexts about textual obfuscation, and once stating that Dao'an "strove to extirpate the geyi of the past and to open up spiritual principles (shenli 神理) for the future". Jizang (549–623), founder of the Three Treatise School, repeats the same criticism four times: "Categorized concepts were pedantic and went against the fundament; the Six [Prajñā] Schools were biased and off the mark".

A final Song dynasty (960–1279) example shows how geyi became forgotten and misunderstood. The Buddhist lexicon written by Daocheng 道誠 (fl. 1019) garbles what Daoxuan wrote about geyi. The entry on nishu 擬書 "matched writings" says:

The eminent monk Faya excelled at Buddhist and non-Buddhist studies. Many lay scholars requested that he teach them. Given that the meanings in the sutras were difficult to explain, Faya matched them with [those] in non-Buddhist literature in order to provide instances of lively explications. This was called [挌義] 'striking concepts'.

This passage not only has a typographical error of ge 挌 "strike; hit" for the ge 格 "categorize" in geyi, but also omits shishu 事數.

After analyzing all the occurrences of the "much vexed term" geyi in the entire Buddhist canon, Mair concludes that geyi was an exegetical method to cope with the Indian proclivity for numerical lists of ideas and concepts.

From its few occurrences in the Buddhist canon, it is evident that geyi was an abortive exegetical method, not a vital translation technique or essential philosophical principle. The main reason we know about geyi at all is because the celebrated Eastern Jin monk Dao'an, rightly so, criticized it as ineffective. After the meager series of texts cited earlier, there is no significant mention of geyi until the twentieth century, when it is miraculously revived by modern historians and made to play a key role in the early development of Buddhism in China.

== Modern interpretations ==
Many contemporary sources repeat the fiction that geyi "matching meanings" was an early method for translating Buddhist Sanskrit terms with comparable Chinese (especially Daoist) words. Victor H. Mair traced modern developments of the pseudo-geyi notion from a Chinese historian's hypothesis in the 1930s, to a Japanese scholar's "geyi Buddhism" proposal in the 1940s, through Buddhist dictionary entries in the 1970s, into general-purpose dictionaries and encyclopedias in the 1980s and 1990s, and to the present-day article of faith in Chinese Buddhist historiography that geyi "matching meanings" was a Buddho-Daoist tradition.

Chen Yinke (1890–1969), a prominent Chinese historian and sinologist, first hypothesized, in his 1933 study of the Jin dynasty Buddhist scholar Zhi Mindu 支愍度, that geyi was an early method for translating Buddhist scriptures, which later became an essential component throughout the history of Chinese philosophy.

During the Jin era, the scholars who engaged in Pure Conversation (qingtan 清談) mostly favored strained comparisons (bifu 比附) between Buddhist texts and non-Buddhist writings. What is more, among the monks there was a concrete method called geyi. Although the term geyi is seldom seen in written records, it was prevalent for a period, and its influence on contemporary thought was profound.

Admitting the lack of historical evidence, Chen putatively connected the name zhulin 竹林 "bamboo forest/grove" referring to both the Zhulin qi qian Seven Sages of the Bamboo Grove (the famous 3rd-century nonconformist geniuses) and the Zhulin Chinese translation of Sanskrit Venuvana "bamboo forest" (the sacred Buddhist building constructed by King Samaratungga in the 9th century BCE). Chen further claimed that geyi was a powerful intellectual force through the Six Dynasties and produced Northern Song dynasty Neo-Confucianism. "Given Chen Yinke’s enormous prestige," Mair says, "it is not surprising that his uncharacteristically poorly substantiated article and lectures on geyi set the tone for all discussions of this topic for the next seven decades."

Tang Yongtong 湯用彤 (1893–1964), a scholar of Chinese Buddhist history, wrote an influential article about geyi, translated into English by M.C. Rogers; it made the semantically contradictory claim that: "Ko, in this context, has the meaning of 'to match' or 'to measure'; yi means 'name', 'term' or 'concept'; Ko-yi is (the method or scheme of) matching ideas (or terms), or 'the equation of ideas'." Tang's 1936 history of early Chinese Buddhism repeated this geyi misconstruction: "What is geyi? Ge means 'to measure, estimate, evaluate' (liang 量). It is a method of comparing and matching with Chinese thought to cause people to understand Buddhist writings easily."

The next bizarre development in geyi-ism was a Buddho-Daoist construct that Japanese scholars of Buddhism called kakugi Bukkyō 格義仏教 "geyi Buddhism". Mair describes this as "reification of a hypothetical construct that never existed in historical reality, but one that—once born—takes on a life of its own and becomes a cornerstone in studies of the history and thought of Chinese Buddhism".

Tsukamoto Zenryū 塚本善隆 (1898–1980) mentioned "geyi Buddhism" in his 1942 history of Chinese Buddhism in relation to the Eastern Jin Qingtan Pure Conversation group. Tsukamoto's history describes Zhu Faya and geyi.

[W]hether accurately or not, Fa-ya is credited with the invention of ko i, a method of interpreting the Buddhist scriptures by appeal to alleged analogues in Chinese secular literature, specifically the I-Lao-Chuang circuit. As indicated above, there was nothing revolutionary in this, for the Taoistically inclined Chinese who found himself receptive to Buddhism automatically assumed that the two gospels were identical. Reading only Chinese, he had no way of knowing what underlay the scriptures familiar to him, and in all likelihood he did not care anyway. Ko i is significant in that it is an explicit statement to the effect that textual and doctrinal difficulties are properly solved by scrutinizing Taoist analogues. It is also worthy of anticipation that Tao-an, fellow-disciple to Fa-ya, rejected ko i out of hand—or so he thought. For the Chinese Buddhist monks who read no Sanskrit—hence for the majority of the Chinese saṃgha—ko i was in China to stay.

Tsukamoto and other scholars hypothesized that geyi was a vital factor in the early development of Chinese Buddhism, connecting Wei-Jin period Xuanxue with early prajna studies.

Fung Yu-Lan's widely-read history of Chinese philosophy introduced geyi to English readers: "Such use of Taoist terminology to explain Buddhist concepts was known at the time as ko yi or the 'method of analogy' (lit., 'extending the idea')." Mair notes these "two incompatible renderings of geyi in the same sentence."

Relying on Fung Yu-lan, the Chinese historian K. C. Hsiao claimed that: "At the time there were many who discussed Buddhism in terms drawn from the Chuang Tzu; that process was called ko-yi [格義, or 'matching of terms']," and defined geyi as "'invoking the meaning', a method of matching terms used in translating Buddhist writings into Chinese."

Arthur Link wrote several articles concerning geyi, which he defined as "'matching meanings', a method whereby Chinese terms and concepts (chiefly Taoist) were paired with analogous Indian terms and ideas".

Arthur F. Wright's book on Buddhism in Chinese history translates geyi as "matching concepts" and claims the method, "which was prevalent in the second and third centuries, was probably favored in the oral exposition of Buddhist teachings."

The scholar of Chinese religions Wing-tsit Chan defined geyi as "the practice of 'matching concepts' of Buddhism and Taoism, in which a Buddhist concept is matched with one in Chinese thought. Thus tathatā (thusness, ultimate reality) was translated by the Taoist term 'original non-being' (pen-wu, pure being)."

Kenneth Ch'en relied upon Tang Yongtong's article, and described geyi as "the method of matching the meaning. This method was used especially by the translators of the Prajñā sutras for the purpose of making Buddhist thought more easily understood by the Chinese." Mair calls Ch'en's explanation "particularly damaging because his book has been, and still is, so widely used in introductory courses concerning Chinese Buddhism".

Beginning in the 1970s, Japanese dictionaries of Buddhism included kakugi (geyi) definitions. For example, Hajime Nakamura's (1975) Bukkyōgo daijiten 佛教語大辞典: "Matching non-Buddhist religious concepts to Buddhist technical terms in order to understand Buddhism. When Buddhism was first transmitted to China, it was the scholarly fashion to explain the emptiness of prajñā by analogy to Lao-Zhuang thought."

The religious studies scholar Whalen Lai wrote an article about geyi based upon correspondence between a Confucian scholar and Buddhist monks, recorded in Sengyou's (517) Hongmingji 弘明集 collection. Lai claims that Geyi Fojiao "Concept-Matching Buddhism" developed when 4th-century Chinese Xuanxue "neo-Taoist intellectuals were drawn to the emptiness philosophy of the Prajñāpāramitā sūtras" and "attempted to match Buddhist and Taoist concepts". Lai admits that geyi is more than the pairing of concepts. "It assumes structural parallels. The latter has natural limitations. There might not be, in the recipient culture, idea complexes comparable to the alien system being introduced." For instance, in the absence of a comparable Chinese counterpart for the Trikaya "Three Bodies/Personalities [of the Buddha]" doctrine, it was simply translated Sanshen 三身 "three bodies". Lai expands geyi from a minor teaching technique into a universal principle. "It is perhaps not necessary to insist that in any initial cultural encounter, epistemic translations of things foreign into things familiar are the norm. Indeed, perhaps all human understanding is ko-i, that is, an endless appropiation [sic] of new ideas by relying on the flexibility of the old."

In a study of Prajñāpāramitā prefaces written by Tao'an, Leon Hurvitz and Arthur Link describe geyi with an elaborate scenario.

Prior to Tao-an’s time it had been popular to explain Buddhist works by a method of exegesis called ko yi 格義, "matching meanings". This meant that the Indian terms and concepts in a systematic fashion were explained via Chinese terms and concepts. In general, the texts used for this purpose were the Lao tzu 老子, the Yi ching 易經, and the Chuang tzu 莊子. Though this was a definite step forward in the earlier period, when it was devised as a technique of analysis and exegesis of the foreign texts, it later became a crutch and a hindrance to a correct understanding of the Buddhist concepts. Tao-an came to understand that this method of "matching meanings" frequently did injustice to the Indian texts, and it is characteristic of his great originality that, despite its traditional and almost universal acceptance by his contemporaries, he nevertheless abandoned it.

Pseudo-geyi theorizing reached a wider audience through Tsukamoto's book translation, A History of Early Chinese Buddhism. It claims that when Buddhism was first introduced to China, it was received as a sort of "Taoistic" religion, and then passed to the stage of geyi interpretation of Buddhist doctrine resorting to the ideas of Laozi and Zhuangzi. "Geyi Buddhism" later became "a device resorted to by all of [Dao’an’s] contemporaries, that of interpreting the Buddhist scriptures in terms of the Chinese classics and of traditional Chinese ideas". Tsukamoto repeatedly postulates geyi connections with Xuanxue "dark learning" Neo-Daoism: "the propagation of Buddhism in keeping with 'dark learning' is just another name for ko yi Buddhism", geyi is "the method that consisted of understanding, or of expounding, the Prajñāpāramitā by resort to 'dark learning', i.e., to a set of ideas claiming descent from Lao-tzu and Chuang-tzu". Tsukamoto gives examples of geyi "style of learning" lists, such as equating the Buddhist "Five Precepts [wujie 五戒, pañca-śīlāni] with the Five Norms [wuchang 五常] for the purpose of propagating the scriptures among Chinese intellectuals." However, this correlation is insubstantial. Compare the wujie "Five Precepts" (to abstain from harming living beings, stealing, sexual misconduct, lying, and intoxication) and the Confucian wuchang 五常 "Five Constants" (humanity, justice, propriety, wisdom, and faith).

By the 1980s and 1990s, misinformation about geyi had spread from specialized articles and books about Chinese Buddhism into reputable general-purpose references. The Encyclopædia Britannica includes a full Geyi entry.

Chinese "matching the meanings" Wade-Giles romanization ke-yi. In Chinese Buddhism, the practice of borrowing from Daoist and other philosophical texts phrases with which to explain their own ideas. According to tradition, geyi was first used by Zhu Faya, a student of many religions of the 4th century CE, as he came to understand Buddhism. The technique reached its height of development among translators of the Prajna sutras, who sought to make Buddhist thought more accessible to Chinese readers. After Kumarajiva began his missionary work in China about 401, geyi was no longer needed; the ideas could be explained directly by an Indian authority.

The Routledge Encyclopedia of Philosophy entry on Chinese Buddhist philosophy mentions geyi.

Dao’an (AD 312–85) criticized the Prajñā schools, challenging their faithfulness to authentic Buddhist positions as well as the translation methodologies behind the texts they and other Chinese Buddhists had come to rely on. In particular, he criticized the practice of ‘matching the meanings’ (geyi), by which translators seeking Chinese equivalents for Indian Buddhist technical terms and concepts borrowed heavily from Daoist literature. This ‘matching of meanings’ was a mixed blessing. Packaging Buddhist ideas in familiar terms made them amenable and understandable, but the ‘matches’ were often less than perfect, distorting or misrepresenting Buddhism. For instance, early translators chose a well-known Daoist and Confucian term, wuwei (nondeliberative activity), to translate nirvāṇa. Arguably, wuwei and nirvāṇa represent the teloi of Daoism and Buddhism, respectively, but it is not obvious that they denote the same telos.

Not only English reference works, but also Chinese and Japanese ones give similarly erroneous geyi definitions. For instance, the popular Chinese dictionary Cihai:

A method for explaining Buddhist sutras during the Wei-Jin period. At that time, when Buddhist sutras had only recently been transmitted to China, in order to make it easier to propagate them, some Buddhist scholars invariably used indigenous concepts and vocabulary from Chinese philosophy (chiefly Lao-Zhuang philosophy) to carry out strained comparisons and explanations. They believed that they could thereby ‘measure’ the texts of the sutras and clarify the principles in them, hence the name [geyi].

Despite all these empirically false examples of explaining geyi, there are some noteworthy counterexamples. The Dutch sinologist Erik Zürcher defines geyi as "elucidating Buddhist terms, notably numerical categories (shu), with the help of notions extracted from traditional Chinese philosophy." Robert Sharf, a professor of Buddhist studies, expresses skepticism about whether geyi was a significant phenomenon in Chinese Buddhist history.

The shortcomings of these early Chinese Buddhist writings are viewed as the result of ko-i 格義, or 'matching concepts,' a spurious practice that supposedly involved the use of native Chinese terminology, culled primarily from Taoist classics, to express Buddhist concepts. … For the scholar interested in the larger issue of sinification, ko-i is a red herring. The practice of elucidating Indian Buddhist concepts by drawing parallels with native systems of thought was ubiquitous throughout the history of Buddhism in China; indeed, how was Buddhism to be understood without some recourse to the familiar?

The Macmillan Encyclopedia of Buddhism, which does not include a geyi article, describes it in the "China" article: "A case in point is the putative method of 'matching the meaning' (geyi), which involved pairing key Buddhist terms with Chinese expressions primarily derived from Daoist sources." Charles Muller's Digital Dictionary of Buddhism entry for geyi cites Mair's "What is Geyi, After All?" article.

Modern reference works have commonly defined this term as something like 'matching meanings,' to describe a translation strategy assumed to have been used during the earliest period of the rendering of Indian Buddhist texts into Chinese, where Indian terms such as śūnyatā were rendered into Chinese with comparable concepts such as wu 無, with mixed results in terms of accuracy. Victor Mair, in investigating the grounds of this theory, has found it to be utterly without support, explaining that "we may conclude that geyi...was not a translation technique at all but an exegetical method, and that it was by no means restricted exclusively to drawing upon Daoist texts for its non-Buddhist (i.e., non-Indian, non-Indic) comparanda.

Scholars construe weak and strong (or yinshen 引伸 "extended") versions of geyi-ism. Weaker interpretations (e.g., Arthur F. Wright) historically treat geyi "matching concepts" as a short-lived Buddhist method of Chinese translation that was abandoned in the 4th century. Stronger interpretations (e.g., "Geyi Buddhism") ahistorically treat pseudo-geyi as a universal method of intercultural philosophy. For instance, Chin Yinke claiming geyi was an essential historical component in Chinese philosophy, and Whalen Lai suggesting, "all human understanding is geyi." The Japanese scholar Takatoshi Itō conflates pseudo-geyi scholarship with philosophical daoli 道理 " principle; truth; reason".

For my own part, I basically wish to adopt the interpretation of geyi put forward by Chen Yinke and other Chinese researchers. In addition to this, I characterize the indigenous thought of China that played such a decisive role especially in geyi-based Buddhism, namely, Lao-Zhuang thought, as the "philosophy of dao-li," and defining geyi as the comprehension and interpretation of Buddhism on the basis of this philosophy of dao-li. I refer to all forms of Buddhism based on this geyi-conditioned understanding as geyi-based Buddhism.

Two final examples are the fanxiang geyi 反向格義 "reverse analogical interpretation" method of employing Western philosophical ideas to interpret ancient Chinese philosophy, and "Nestorian geyi" causing Church of the East in China missionaries to fail in converting Chinese to Christianity.

The various 20th-century delusions about geyi "matching meanings" or "matching concepts" are based on ignoring the Chinese historical and linguistic evidence. Only a few Eastern Jin scholars unsuccessfully experimented with the geyi method of explaining Buddhist terminological lists before it was abandoned; the ge component does not mean "matching".

Pseudo-geyi speculations have resulted in widespread misunderstanding about the histories of Daoism and Chinese Buddhism. Geyi did not originate from Wei-Jin Xuanxue "Mysterious Study" Neo-Daoism studies of Prajnaparamita "Perfection of Wisdom" sutras, and it was not a basic principle of early Buddho-Daoist interactions.

Mair explains that while many "geyi enthusiasts" assert that when Buddhism arrived in China during the Eastern Han period, "it turned to Daoism for its technical terminology and other religious attributes, what actually transpired is more nearly just the opposite." When Buddhist missionaries came to China via the Silk Road (circa the 1st and 2nd century CE), they introduced a mature religion with a sophisticated system of thought, numerous scriptures, and complex institutions. At that very same time, religious Daoism was beginning to take shape with Way of the Five Pecks of Rice (starting in 142) and Tianshi "Celestial Masters" (late 2nd century). In other words, "Daoism as a formal, organised religion with a body of texts, monastic rules and institutions, nascent iconography and set of ritualised practice was to a large extent a response to the advent of Buddhism."

It is important to recognize that the geyi method compared numerical lists of Buddhist and non-Buddhist terms for purposes of explanation, and not Buddhist and Daoist terms for purposes of translation. Mair concludes that geyi "lasted for but a brief moment in the history of Buddhism, and was almost totally unknown outside of the handful of its practitioners. In a comprehensive, detailed history of the development of early Chinese Buddhism, geyi deserves to be mentioned, but not as the centerpiece that modern scholarship has made of it."

== Translations ==
Variations among English translations of Chinese geyi reveal the scholarly difficulties in understanding it. Compare:

- "the method (or scheme of) matching ideas (or terms)" or "the equation of ideas"
- "method of analogy" (lit., 'extending the idea')"
- "matching meanings"
- "match meanings"
- "matching of terms" or "invoking the meaning"
- "matching concepts"
- "method of matching the meaning"
- "concept-matching" or "match Buddhist and Taoist concepts"
- "investigating the Doctrine", "investigating the meaning", or "matching the categories"
- "matching the meaning"
- "matching the meanings"
