= Zhu Faya =

Chinese Buddhist monk

Zhu Faya (Chinese: 竺法雅; pinyin: Zhú Fǎyǎ; Wade–Giles: Chu Fa-ya; lit. 'Buddhist Dharmic Elegance') or Faya was a Chinese Jin Dynasty (266–420 CE) Buddhist monk and teacher from Hejian (in modern Hebei province), best known for developing the Geyi method of explaining numbered categories of Sanskrit terms from the Buddhist canon with comparable lists from the Chinese classics. The dates of Zhu Faya's life are unknown, but he was a student of the Indian monk Fotudeng or Zhu Fotudeng 竺佛圖澄 (c. 231–349), and a contemporary of the translators Dao'an 道安 (312–385) and Zhu Fatai 竺法汰 (320–387).

== Names ==
The Chinese name Zhu Faya combines two Buddhist terms. The Chinese surname Zhu 竺, which originally meant "a kind of bamboo" and was later used for "India (abbreviating Tianzhu 天竺)" and "Buddhism", was adopted by many early Buddhist monks, such as the polyglot translator Zhu Fahu 竺法護 or Dharmarakṣa (c. 230–316). Zhu Faya took this surname in honor of his teacher Zhu Fotudeng, as did several other disciples such as Zhu Fatai (above) and Zhu Senglang 竺僧郎, who in 351 founded the first Buddhist monastery in Shandong. The Buddhist Dharma name (rather than Chinese given name) of Faya 法雅 means "Dharmic Elegance", with the Fa "law; Dharma" seen in Fatai and Fahu. The toponymic name Zhu Faya of Zhongshan 中山 (100 km west of Hejian) occurs in the (6th century) Memoirs of Eminent Monks biography of Fotudeng, which describes famous monks who travelled great distances to hear Fotudeng's discourses.

== Life ==
The primary source for information about Zhu Faya is his Memoirs of Eminent Monks biography.

(Zhu) Faya was a man of Hejian. He was of a staid, tolerant disposition. As a youth, he excelled at non-Buddhist studies, and when he grew up he became proficient in Buddhist doctrine. The sons of gentry families all attached themselves to him and requested that he teach them. At that time, the adherents who followed him were uniformly well-versed in secular works, but did not yet excel in Buddhist principles. Consequently, (Zhu Fa)ya, with Kang Falang and others, correlated the numerations of items (shishu 事數) in the sutras with non-Buddhist writings as instances of lively explication; this was called "categorizing concepts" (geyi). Thereupon, Vibhu (?), Tanxiang, and others also debated over the categorised concepts in order to instruct their disciples. (Zhu Fa)ya's manner was unrestrained and he excelled (in getting at) the crux (of the matter). He alternately lectured on secular works and Buddhist sutras. With Dao’an and Fatai, he often explained the doubtful points they had assembled, and together they exhausted the essentials of the sutras. Later, he established a monastery at Gaoyi, where he tirelessly taught a saṅgha-fellowship of more than a hundred. One of (Zhu Fa)ya’s disciples, Tanxi, emulated his master in excelling at discourse, and was honored by Shi Xuan, heir apparent to the throne of the Latter Zhao [319–351].

Gaoyi 高邑 is in southwestern Hebei province. Shi Xuan 石宣 was the son of Empress Du.

The American sinologist Arthur F. Wright characterizes Zhu Faya.

CHU Fa-ya 竺法雅 was a Chinese monk who, like several of Teng's disciples, took the surname CHU out of respect for his master. Though he was a northerner, his contribution was to the development of the intellectual Buddhism of the south. He was a careful student of both Buddhism and Taoism. Far more earnest than most of the courtier monks of the south, he was dissatisfied with superficial resemblances between Taoist and Buddhist terms and concepts and sought to clarify and regularize the use of Taoist terms in Buddhist exegesis. He called his system ko-i. In the end it contributed to the understanding of Buddhism among educated Chinese and was a step forward in the long process of the Sinicization of Buddhism.

Tsukamoto Zenryū 塚本善隆's Japanese-language history of early Chinese Buddhism used Zhu Faya to typify the "homilist-exegete" among Fotudeng's disciples.

[W]hether accurately or not, Fa-ya is credited with the invention of ko i, a method of interpreting the Buddhist scriptures by appeal to alleged analogues in Chinese secular literature, specifically the I-Lao-Chuang circuit. As indicated above, there was nothing revolutionary in this, for the Taoistically inclined Chinese who found himself receptive to Buddhism automatically assumed that the two gospels were identical. Reading only Chinese, he had no way of knowing what underlay the scriptures familiar to him, and in all likelihood he did not care anyway. Ko i is significant in that it is an explicit statement to the effect that textual and doctrinal difficulties are properly solved by scrutinizing Taoist analogues. It is also worthy of anticipation that Tao-an, fellow-disciple to Fa-ya, rejected ko i out of hand—or so he thought. For the Chinese Buddhist monks who read no Sanskrit—hence for the majority of the Chinese saṃgha—ko i was in China to stay.
