= History of Taoism =

The history of Taoism stretches throughout Chinese history. Originating in prehistoric China, it has exerted a powerful influence over Chinese culture throughout the ages. Taoism evolved in response to changing times, with its doctrine and associated practices being revised and refined. The acceptance of Taoism by the ruling class has waxed and waned, alternately enjoying periods of favor and rejection. Most recently, Taoism has emerged from a period of suppression and is undergoing a revival in China.

Laozi (Lao Tzu) is traditionally regarded as the founder of the Taoist religion and is closely associated in this context with "original", or "primordial", Taoism. Whether he actually existed is disputed, and the work attributed to him – the Daodejing (Tao Te Ching) – is dated between the 8th and 3rd century BC. The Yellow Emperor, Huangdi (2697–2597 BCE) is also often associated with the origin of the Tao; his works are believed to have greatly influenced Laozi. It is possible Taoism existed before Laozi, as he refers to the "Tao masters of antiquity" in the 15th chapter of the Daodejing; however it is also possible he was referring to masters—mythical or historical—of the wisdom to which Taoism points, rather than masters of Taoism as an already established religion.

Sinologist Isabelle Robinet identifies four components in the emergence of Taoism:

1. Philosophical Taoism, i.e. the Daodejing and Zhuangzi
2. Techniques for achieving ecstasy
3. Practices for achieving longevity or immortality
4. Exorcism

Some elements of Taoism may be traced to prehistoric folk religions in China that later coalesced into a Taoist tradition. In particular, many Taoist practices drew from the Warring-States-era phenomena of the Wu (shaman) (connected to the "shamanism" of Southern China) and the Fangshi (which probably derived from the "archivist-soothsayers of antiquity, one of whom supposedly was Laozi himself"), even though later Taoists insisted that this was not the case. Both terms were used to designate individuals dedicated to "... magic, medicine, divination,... methods of longevity and to ecstatic wanderings" as well as exorcism; in the case of the wu, "shamans" or "sorcerers" is often used as a translation. The fangshi were philosophically close to the School of Yin-Yang, and relied much on astrological and calendrical speculations in their divinatory activities.

== Shang dynasty (1600–1046 BC) ==
Predecessors to Taoism existed among the lower class during the Shang dynasty.

== Zhou dynasty (770–256 BC) ==
According to traditional accounts, Laozi was a scholar who worked as the Keeper of the Archives for the royal court of Zhou. This reportedly allowed him broad access to the works of the Yellow Emperor and other classics of the time. The stories assert that Laozi never opened a formal school but nonetheless attracted numerous students and loyal disciples. There are many variations of a story retelling his encounter with Confucius, most famously in the Zhuangzi.

Sima Qian stated that Laozi grew weary of the moral decay of life in Chengzhou and noted the kingdom's decline. He ventured west to live as a hermit in the unsettled frontier at the age of 80. At the western gate of the city (or kingdom), he was recognized by the guard Yinxi. The sentry asked the old master to record his wisdom for the good of the country before he would be permitted to pass. The text Laozi wrote was said to be the Tao Te Ching, although the present version of the text includes additions from later periods. In some versions of the tale, the sentry was so touched by the work that he became a disciple and left with Laozi, never to be seen again. Laozi's disciples Yinxi and Wenzi went on to write their own works, the Guan Yi and Tongxuan zhenjing, respectively.

Lie Yukou was born in the State of Zheng, near today's Zhengzhou, Henan Province. He was living in the Chêng State not long before the year 398 BC, when the Prime Minister Tzu Yang was killed in a revolution. It was at this time that Yukou wrote the Liezi.

Zhuang Zhou was born around 369 BCE in a town called Meng, in the state of Song, where he worked as a minor town official. Zhuang made himself well acquainted with all the literature of his time, but preferred the views of Laozi; and ranked himself among his followers. He wrote stories to satirize and expose the disciples of Confucius, and clearly exhibit the sentiments of Lao. These were collected in the Zhuangzi, which contains stories and anecdotes that exemplify the carefree nature of the ideal Taoist sage. Zhuang died in 286 BCE.

During the late Warring States period, a hermit named Guigu Xiansheng was said to have compiled the Guiguzi, a work that discusses techniques of political lobbying based in Taoist thinking. He conveyed the teachings of this School of Diplomacy to Su Qin, Zhang Yi, Sun Bin and Pang Juan, who would all go on to become famed military strategists and diplomats. Zhang Yi, in particular, paved the way for the domination of the Qin dynasty and helped found the school of Legalism as the dynasty's guiding philosophy. After the Qin centralized power and brought the period of civil conflict to a close, they engaged in the burning of books and burying of scholars – many Taoist works were presumed lost. As such, many of the Zhou-era Taoist texts are sourced during the Han dynasty, and the existence of many of the Zhou-era Taoist sages and texts are still disputed.

== Han dynasty (206 BCE–220 CE) ==
The term Daojia (usually translated as "philosophical Taoism") was coined during the Han dynasty. In Sima Qian's history (chapter 63) it refers to immortals; in Liu Xiang it refers to Laozi and Zhuangzi (Daojiao came to be applied to the religious movements in later times). The earliest commentary on the Dao De Jing is that of Heshang Gong (the "Riverside Master"), a legendary figure depicted as a teacher to the Han emperor. In the early Han dynasty, the Tao came to be associated with or conflated with the Xian Di Emperor. A major text from the Huang-Lao movement would be the Huainanzi, which interprets earlier works of the Taoist canon in light of the quest for immortality.

The first organized form of Taoism, the Tianshi (Celestial Masters') school (later known as Zhengyi school), developed from the Five Pecks of Rice movement at the end of the 2nd century CE; the latter had been founded by Zhang Daoling, who claimed that Laozi appeared to him in the year 142. The Tianshi school was officially recognized by ruler Cao Cao in 215, legitimizing Cao Cao's rise to power in return. Laozi received imperial recognition as a divinity in the mid-2nd century.

The Celestial Masters' activities did hasten the downfall of the Han dynasty, largely because Zhang's grandson set up a theocratic state in what is now Sichuan province. The same could be said of their contemporaries, the Taoist-leaning Yellow Turban sect.

== Three Kingdoms period (220–265) ==
During the Three Kingdoms period, the Xuanxue (Mysterious Wisdom) school, including Wang Bi, focused on the texts of Laozi and Zhuangzi. Many of the school's members, including Wang Bi himself, were not religious in any sense. Wang Bi mostly focused on reconciling Confucian thought with Taoist thought. Because the version of the Tao Te Ching that has been passed on to the present is the one that Wang Bi commented upon, his interpretations became very influential as they were passed on alongside the Tao Te Ching. In addition, his commentary was compatible with Confucian ideas and Buddhist ideas that later entered China. This compatibility ensured Taoism would remain an important aspect of Chinese culture, and made the merging of the three religions easier in later periods, such as the Tang dynasty.

== Six Dynasties (316–589) ==
Taoist alchemist Ge Hong, also known as Baopuzi (抱扑子 The 'Master Embracing Simplicity') was active in the third and fourth centuries and had great influence on later Taoism. Major scriptures were produced during this time period, including the Shangqing (上清 'Supreme Clarity') (365–370) and Lingbao (靈寶 'Sacred Treasure') scriptures (397–402) received at Maoshan. The Shangqing revelations were received by Yang Xi, a relative of Ge Hong's; the revelations emphasised meditative visualisation (內觀 neiguan). They spoke of the Shangqing heaven, which stood above what had been previously considered the highest heaven by Celestial Master Taoists. Yang Xi's revelations consisted of visitations from the residents of this heaven (the "Zhenren") many of whom were ancestors of a circle of aristocrats from southern China. These Zhenren spoke of an apocalypse which was to arrive in 384, and claimed that only certain people from this aristocratic circle had been chosen to be saved. For the first century of its existence, Shangqing Taoism was isolated to this aristocratic circle. However, Tao Hongjing (456–536) codified and wrote commentaries on Yang Xi's writings and allowed for the creation of Shangqing Taoism as a popular religion. The Lingbao scriptures added some Buddhist elements, such as an emphasis on universal salvation.

Also, during the Six Dynasties period, the Celestial Master movement re-emerged in two distinct forms. The Northern Celestial Masters were founded in 424 century by Kou Qianzhi, and a Taoist theocracy was established that lasted until 450 CE. After this time, the Northern Celestial Masters were expelled from the Wei court and re-established themselves at Louguan where they survived into the Tang dynasty. The Southern Celestial Masters were centered at Jiankang (modern-day Nanjing), and were likely made of those adherents who fled Sichuan and others who fled from Luoyang after its fall in 311 CE. These various followers of The Way of the Celestial Master coalesced to form a distinct form of Taoism known as the Southern Celestial Masters, who lasted as a distinct movement into the fifth century.

== Tang dynasty (618–907) ==
Taoism gained official status in China during the Tang dynasty, whose emperors claimed Laozi as their relative. However, it was forced to compete with Confucianism and Buddhism, its major rivals, for patronage and rank. Skepticism about the existence and goodness of xian, the traditional view on heaven, and other factors boosted conversion from Chinese folk religion and Taoism to Buddhism, especially among peasants. Tiān often was seen by Chinese peasants as a capricious force that only granted certain chosen ones the privilege of becoming xian and bound all other souls in "gloomy underworld jails."

Taoist sects and Buddhist temple monks were often bitter ideological rivals that made scathing statements about each other and the faith they did not represent.

Emperor Xuanzong (685–762), who ruled at the height of the Tang, wrote commentaries on texts from all three of these traditions, which exemplifies the fact that in many people's lives they were not mutually exclusive. This marks the beginning of a long-lived tendency within imperial China, in which the government supported (and simultaneously regulated) all three movements. The Gaozong Emperor added the Tao Te Ching to the list of classics (jing, 經) to be studied for the imperial examinations.

== Song dynasty (960–1279) ==
Several Song emperors, most notably Huizong, were active in promoting Taoism, collecting Taoist texts and publishing editions of the Daozang.

The Quanzhen school of Taoism was founded during this period, and together with the resurgent Celestial Masters called the Zhengyi is one of the two schools of Taoism that have survived to the present.

The Song dynasty saw an increasingly complex interaction between the elite traditions of organised Taoism as practised by ordained Taoist ministers (daoshi) and the local traditions of folk religion as practised by spirit mediums (wu) and a new class of non-ordained ritual experts known as fashi. This interaction manifested itself in the integration of 'converted' local deities into the bureaucratically organised Taoist pantheon and the emergence of new exorcistic rituals, including the Celestial Heart Rites and the Thunder Rites.

Aspects of Confucianism, Taoism, and Buddhism were consciously synthesised in the Neo-Confucian school, which eventually became Imperial orthodoxy for state bureaucratic purposes.

== Yuan dynasty (1279–1367) ==
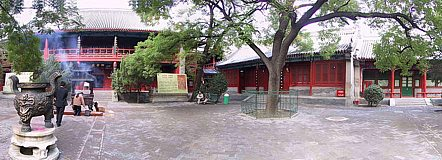
White Cloud Monastery in Beijing

Taoism suffered a significant setback in 1281 when many copies of the Daozang were ordered burned. This destruction gave Taoism a chance to renew itself. Neidan, a form of internal alchemy, became a major emphasis of the Quanzhen sect, whose practitioners followed a monastic model inspired by Buddhism. One of its leaders, Qiu Chuji became a teacher of Genghis Khan before the establishment of the Yuan dynasty. (and used his influence to save millions of lives). Originally from Shanxi and Shandong, the sect established its main center in Beijing's Baiyunguan ("White Cloud Monastery"). Before the end of the dynasty, the Celestial Masters sect (and Buddhism) again gained preeminence.

== Ming dynasty (1368–1644) ==
In 1406, Yongle Emperor of Ming dynasty commanded that all Taoist texts be collected and combined into a new version of the Daozang. The text was finally finished in 1447, and took nearly forty years to complete.

== Qing dynasty (1644–1912) ==
The fall of the Ming dynasty and the subsequent establishment of the Qing dynasty by the Manchus was blamed by some literati on religion, specifically Taoism. They sought to regain power by advocating a return to Confucian orthodoxy in a movement called Hanxue, or "Han Learning." This movement returned the Confucian classics to favor and nearly completely rejected Taoism. During the eighteenth century, the imperial library was constituted, but excluded virtually all Taoist books. Through the Qing-administered agency Bureau of Taoist Registrations, the number of officially ordained Taoist masters was limited. Sponsored Taoist ritual and study sites were also restricted and controlled. By the beginning of the twentieth century, Taoism had fallen much from favor (only one complete copy of the Daozang still remained, at the White Cloud Monastery in Beijing).

== Nationalist period (1912–1949) ==
Kuomintang (Chinese Nationalist Party) leaders embraced science, modernity, and Western culture, including (to some extent) Christianity. Viewing the popular religion as reactionary and parasitic, they confiscated some temples for public buildings, and otherwise attempted to control traditional religious activity.

== People's Republic of China (1949–present) ==
The Chinese Communist Party, officially atheistic, initially suppressed Taoism along with other religions. During the Cultural Revolution from 1966 to 1976, many Taoist temples and sites were destroyed or badly damaged, Taoist clergy were forced to disrobe and were sent to labor camps.

Persecution of Taoists in China eventually stopped in 1979, and many Taoists began reviving their traditions. Subsequently, many temples and monasteries have been repaired and reopened, but the destruction of cultural revolution was substantial.

Taoism is one of five religions officially recognized by the communist government, which regulates its activities through the China Taoist Association. Sensitive areas include the relationship of the Zhengyi Taoist community with their denomination's lineage-holder, Celestial Masters who moved to Taiwan with the Kuomintang, and various traditional temple activities such as astrology and mediumship, which have been criticized as "superstitious".

== Taoism in the West ==
From 1927 to 1944, the chief proponent of Taoism in the West was Professor Henri Maspero in Paris. Michael Saso was the first westerner to be initiated as a Taoist priest; he subsequently served also as co-editor of Taoist Resources. Today, many Taoist organizations like Taoist Church of Italy and Catalan Taoist Association have been established in the West.

"Popular Western Taoism" is a term coined by Jonathan R. Herman in his 1998 review of Ursula K. Le Guin's Daodejing "rendition", referring to the

abundance of new literature on Taoism by nonspecialists, including "translations" of Taoist texts by authors who (sometimes boastfully) lack linguistic competence. Scholars have been quick to reject such documents as ahistorical and inauthentic, and many do indeed combine questionable scholarship with a promiscuous blend of western individualism and new-age universalism. However, this popular western Taoism is not exclusively or even primarily a scholarly phenomenon; rather, it is an aesthetic, cultural, and religious phenomenon.

This review was largely positive with some criticisms and cautions. While Herman states that the book "is not a useful text for informing students" about philosophical thought during the Chinese Warring States period, Herman praised the book as a "surprisingly interesting and scholastically responsible" example of western Daoist thought and as "an intelligent example of the emerging western transformation of Taoism, an area too often overlooked by sinologists." On the other hand, he criticized that Le Guin "make[s] some claims—or rather, employs some language—that may carry misleading implications", such as identifying Laozi "as a mystic and his perceptions as mystical, without ever defining the terms or questioning what generalizations can be drawn."

Herman subsequently described popular Western Taoism as the modern proliferation of self-proclaimed Daoist journals, meditation centers, websites, and renderings of Daoist texts by nonspecialists; and said, "not surprisingly, the sinological community (myself included) has generally greeted this overall phenomenon – what I will from here on label "popular Western Daoism" – with varying degrees of indifferences, amusement, and derision."

In a 1998 article about teaching Daoism, Russell Kirkland urged colleagues not to "Pooh-pooh Taoism" with "popular fluff" like Benjamin Hoff's coffee-table book The Tao of Pooh, and characterized Stephen Mitchell and others as "self-indulgent dilettantes who deceive the public by publishing pseudo-translations of the Tao-te ching, without having actually read the text in its original language".

Louis Komjathy described modern "Western Daoism" or "American Daoism" in religious studies terms, where "New Age discourse communities and advocates of Perennial Philosophy identify and interpret Daoist texts as part of a 'universal wisdom tradition'." Komjathy later elaborated on these spiritual hybrids that "domesticate, sterilize and misrepresent Daoism", and may best be understood as part of a new religious movement labeled "Popular Western Taoism (PWT), with 'Taoism' pronounced with a hard 't' sound." In this construct, "'Daoism' becomes anything for anyone", and Popular Western Taoism "has little to no connection with the Daoist religious tradition."

== See also ==
- List of Taoist states and dynasties
- Taoism
