= Waguan Temple =

Buddhist temple

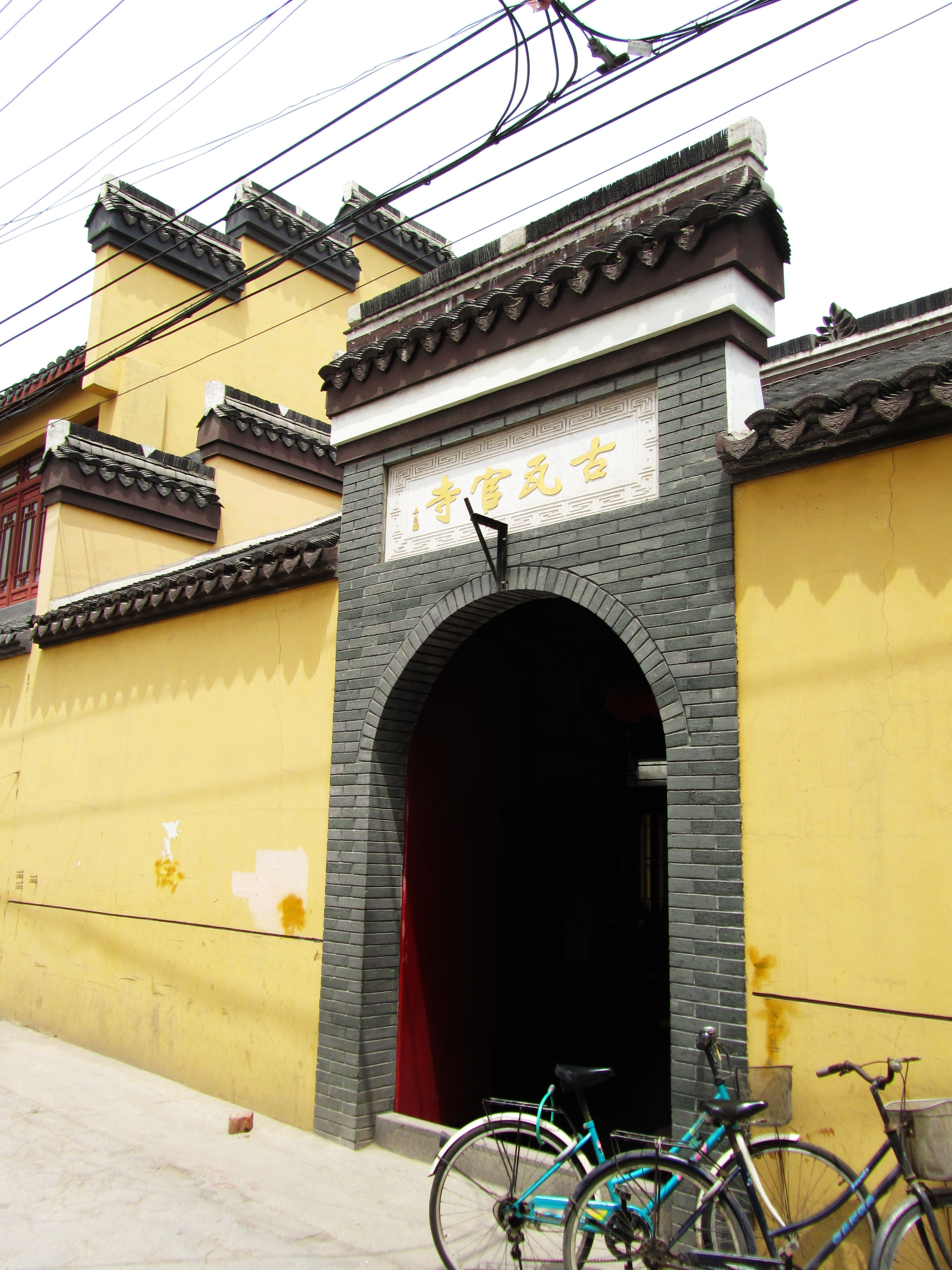
Shanmen

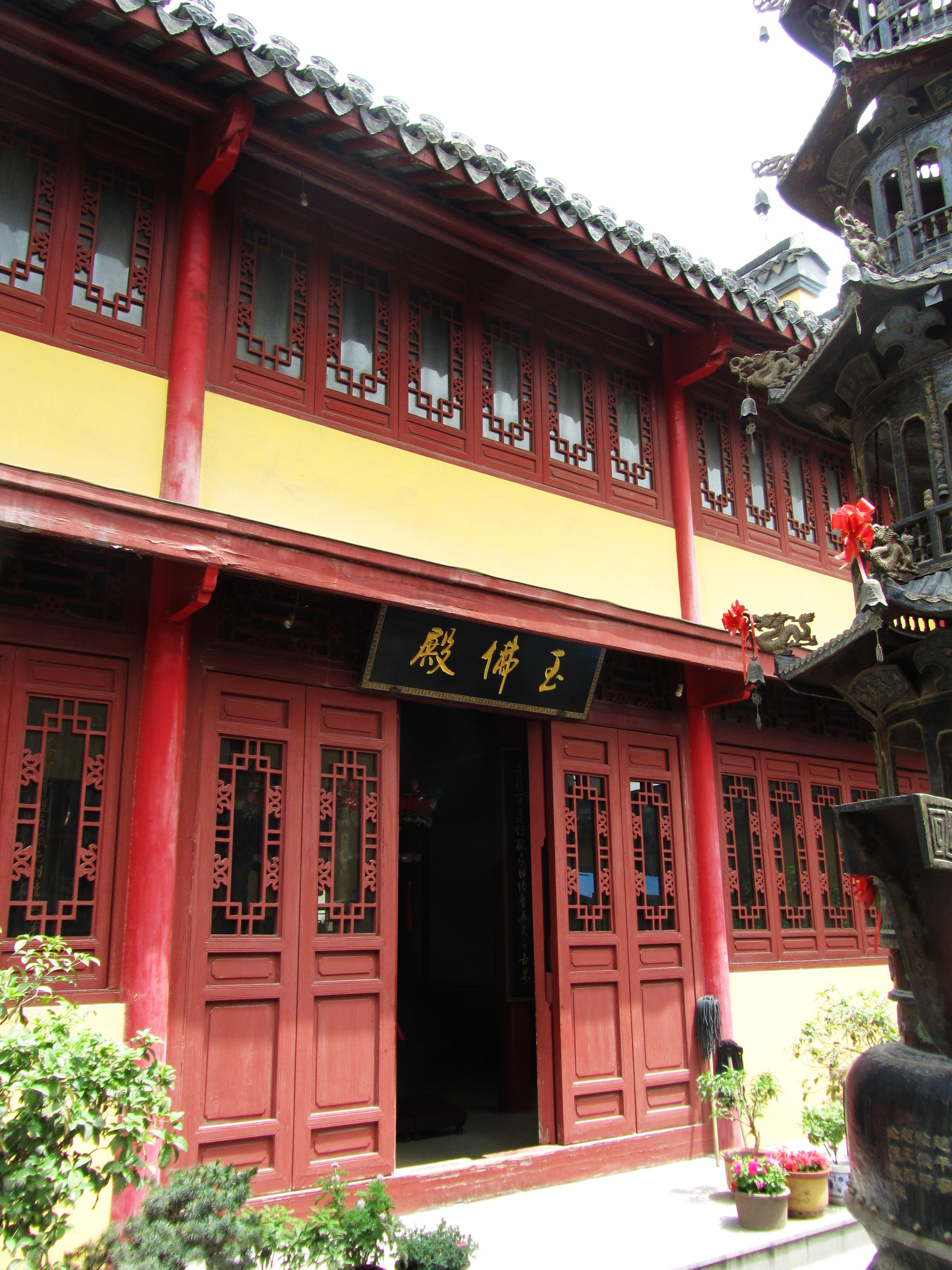
Jade Buddha Hall, which enshrines the Five Tathāgatas

Waguan Temple (Chinese: 瓦官寺; pinyin: Waguansi; lit. 'Tile Office Temple') is a Buddhist temple in Nanjing, China. First established in AD 364 in the Jin dynasty capital of Jiankang (whose area comprises part of modern day Nanjing), its name is derived from it having been built on the site of an old potters' kiln on the southern bank of the Qinhuai River. In the biography of Zhu Fatai, who greatly expanded the temple, the area was originally used to create urns for the dead whose remains were disposed of in the public burial ground.

== History ==
The surrounding Jiangnan region was a heartland of Buddhism in Imperial China, known as the "Cradle of the Monks". With this background, Waguan Temple was built under the sponsorship of Emperor Ai of Jin, originally composed of a stupa and a hall. It quickly became a gathering spot for highly respected monks, such as Zhi Dun and Zhu Daoqian (286–374). A year after its construction, the temple was greatly enlarged by Zhu Fatai, who resided there for two decades. Part of its success was due to the attendance of Zhu Fatai's lectures by Emperor Jianwen at the request of Zhu Fatai's teacher, the eminent monk Dao'an. The expansion of Waguan included monastic quarters and communal halls. It was also known for the Phoenix Terrace, an elevated terrace that offered a view of the Yangtze River that was memorialized by the Tang dynasty poet Li Bai.

By the end of the Eastern Jin dynasty in AD 420, Waguan had become one of the most ornately decorated temples and was known for its "three triumphs": a four-foot and two-inch tall jade statue of the Buddha from Sinhala (Sri Lanka), sculptures of Buddha by the sculptor Dai Kui (Andao), and a painting of Vimalakirti by Gu Kaizhi. Dai Kui, one of the founders of Chinese sculpture and a master of the dry-lacquer technique, and his son Dai Yong installed five "portable images" at Waguan Temple; the images were said to be so extraordinary that they emitted a continuous light and moved mechanically. Gu Kaizhi's painting gained notoriety from a likely untrue story in which he promised to make a huge monetary donation (1,000 taels of silver) to the temple; the monks dismissed him as a braggart because Gu was extremely poor, but his mural painting of Viamalakirti proved to be so spiritually inspiring that individuals who saw it began making large financial contributions to the temple.

The temple, more so than any other in Jiankang, became emblematic of the imperial throne. In the autumn 396, its 350-foot tall pagoda burnt down; this was seen as an omen of death for Emperor Xiaowu, who died two months later.

=== Later years ===
The temple was in active use for at least a millennium and was the home and school of generations of monks from within and without Chinese Buddhism. Its buildings were built and rebuilt many times over the centuries. The founder of Tiantai, Zhiyi, lectured the Lotus Sutra at Waguan Temple when he was thirty-two, ca AD 570. The monk Yuanchong (713–778) described studying at Waguan with a master named Xuan; this was possibly the eminent Tang dynasty monk Daoxuan. The abbot of the temple, Wuyi Keqin, was sent on a diplomatic mission to Japan by Ming Taizu, the founder of the Ming Dynasty, in the late 14th century. The monk Zhuhong, who had taken his monastic vows in 1566, spent time at Waguan recovered from an illness. A 16th century conversation with Wang Shizhen, Ming dynasty poet, writer, artist and litterateur, at Waguan Temple was recorded in the Jinling suoshi. The ruins of the temple are described in a story by the 17th century author Jin Shengtan, in which Lu Zhishen crosses a stone bridge to find the destroyed remains of the temple and sees the door of the visitors hostel has fallen from its hinges.

Several temples, with various names such as Wuxing Temple (吴兴寺) and Fengyou Temple (凤游寺), were constructed on the ruins of Waguan Temple.

In 2003, Waguan Temple was built in the Qinhuai district of Nanjing; it is one of 450 temples in modern Nanjing.
