= Neviano degli Arduini =

- Comune
- Comune di Neviano degli Arduini
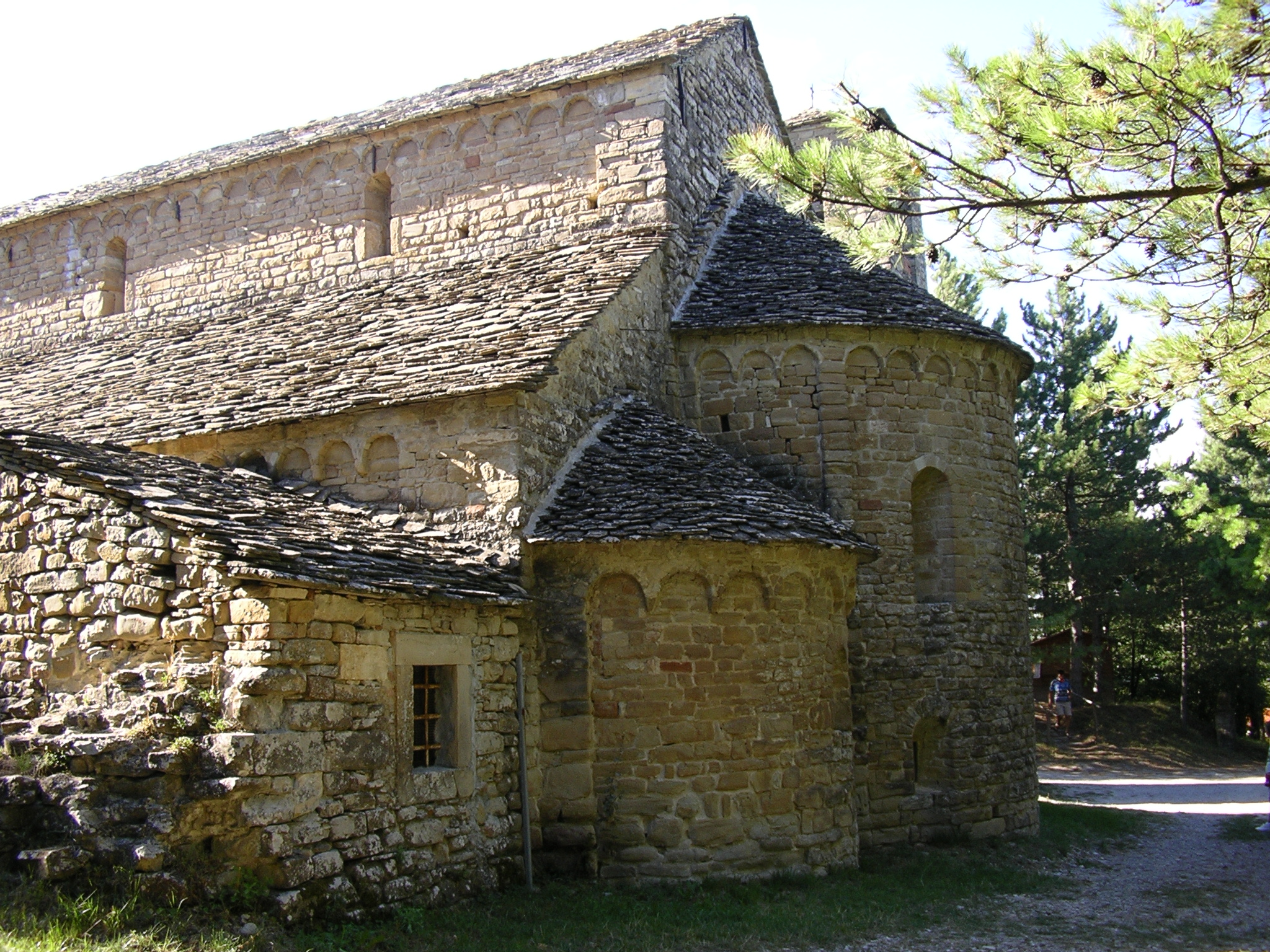
- Apse of the Pieve di Sasso.

- Location within Italy Location within Emilia-Romagna
- Coordinates: 44°35′N 10°19′E
- Country: Italy
- Region: Emilia-Romagna
- Province: Parma (PR)
- Frazioni: Antreola, Ariolla, Begozzo, Bertogallo, Campo del Fico, Campora, Case Bedi, Case Bodini, Case Bosi, Case Campanari, Case Canale, Case della Fossa, Case Fantini, Case Mazza, Case Paini, Case Penuzzi, Case Ruffaldi, Castelmozzano, Cedogno, Ceretolo, Cerreto, Corchio, Corticone, Costola, Formiano, La Bricola, La Costa, La Villa, Le Mole, Lodrignano, Lugaro, Lupazzano, Magrignano, Mercato, Misone, Monchio, Monte, Montetenero, Montroni, Mozzano, Mussatico, Neda, Orzale, Paderna, Pezzalunga, Piazza, Prada, Provazzano, Quinzano, Quinzo, Rivareto, Romazza, Sasso, Scorcoro, Sella di Lodrignano, Signano, Tissore, Urzano, Vezzano, Vico, Vignetta

Government
  - Mayor: Giordano Bricoli

Area
  - Total: 105.9 km^{2} (40.9 sq mi)

Population (31 May 2007)
  - Total: 3,724
  - Density: 35.17/km^{2} (91.08/sq mi)
- Time zone: UTC+1 (CET)
  - Summer (DST): UTC+2 (CEST)
- Postal code: 43024
- Dialing code: 0521
- Website: Official website

Neviano degli Arduini (Parmigiano: Nevian di Arduèn) is a comune (municipality) in the Province of Parma in the Italian region Emilia-Romagna, located about 80 kilometres (50 mi) west of Bologna and about 25 kilometres (16 mi) south of Parma.

In the communal territory is the Romanesque Pieve di Sasso, a national monument. This stone pieve (parish church) was built in the 11th century. Its reconstruction around 1080 is traditionally attributed to Matilda of Tuscany. It is a church with a nave and two aisles, built in rough stone. Notable is the façade, parted by thin pilasters and a medieval portal. It houses a sculpted baptismal font with octagonal plan, and figures of the Evangelists. Other notable buildings include the church of Sant'Ambrogio a Bazzano.

== Twin towns ==
- Tarascon, France
