= An Lingshou =

- Occupation(s): Buddhist nun and missionary

An Lingshou (Chinese: 安令首) was a Chinese Buddhist nun who lived in the first half of the 4th century Common Era. Her father initially refused her permission to become a nun, wanting her to follow the traditional roles of a woman as a wife and mother. He ultimately relented when his spiritual advisor, the monk Fotudeng, pointed out that allowing her to become a nun would bring glory and salvation to the family, a role that fit within the family-oriented values that emphasized a person's duty to the family over individual desires. Her success paved the way for other women to choose a religious life, one that was not focused on the traditional role of a woman in society.

== Life ==
An Lingshou (flourished in the first half of the fourth century), of Dongguan, or Donghuan, in present-day Shandong. She was the daughter (her given name has been lost) of the government official Xu Chong during the Later Zhao dynasty in North China. Her father wanted her to marry, but An had no interest in doing so, preferring the contemplative life. He said that she was selfish and placing her desires over her duties to her parents and family. She replied that her Buddhist faith would help her parents find salvation. Xu Chong then took the issue to Fotudeng who said that allowing An to become a nun would bring the family honor and glory and guide them to salvation.

An became a disciple of Fotudeng and Zhu Jingiang and founded the Jinshu Monastery. She is said to have converted over 200 people and built five monasteries and a retreat. The Emperor Shi Hu promoted her father to the governorship of Qinghe in Hebei Province in recognition of her merits.
