= SASO =

SASO may refer to:

- South African Students' Organisation
- Michael Saso (born 1930), American academic
- Société Aéronautique du Sud-Ouest, French aircraft company that was merged into Société nationale des constructions aéronautiques du sud-ouest in 1938
- Stability And Support Operations
- Saudi Standards, Metrology and Quality Organization (SASO)
- Senior Air Staff Officer

== See also ==
- Sasso
