= Sasso =

Sasso means stone in Italian. Notable people with the surname include:

- Ana Sasso (born c.1963), Croatian former beauty pageant contestant and model
- Cinzia Sasso (born 1956), Italian journalist
- Guidina Dal Sasso (born 1958), Italian cross country skier
- John Sasso, American Democratic political operative
- Käthe Sasso (1926–2024), Austrian child resistance activist in World War II, concentration camp and death march survivor
- Kiara Sasso (born 1979), Brazilian actress and singer
- Loredana Sasso (born 1957), Italian nurse and researcher
- Meredith Sasso, American lawyer and judge
- Sandy Eisenberg Sasso (born 1947), American rabbi
- Vincent Sasso (born 1991), French football player
- Will Sasso (born 1975), Canadian actor

== Places named Sasso ==
- Gran Sasso d'Italia, mountain in the Abruzzo region of central Italy
- Sasso Marconi, town and comune of the province of Bologna in northern Italy
- Monte Sasso, mountain in Lombardy, Italy
- Sasso di Bordighera, village in Liguria, Italy

== See also ==
- Madonna del Sasso (disambiguation)
- Gran Sasso (disambiguation)
- SASO (disambiguation)
