= Sant'Ambrogio a Bazzano =

Church building in Neviano degli Arduini, Italy

Coordinates: 44°34′22″N 10°21′59″E

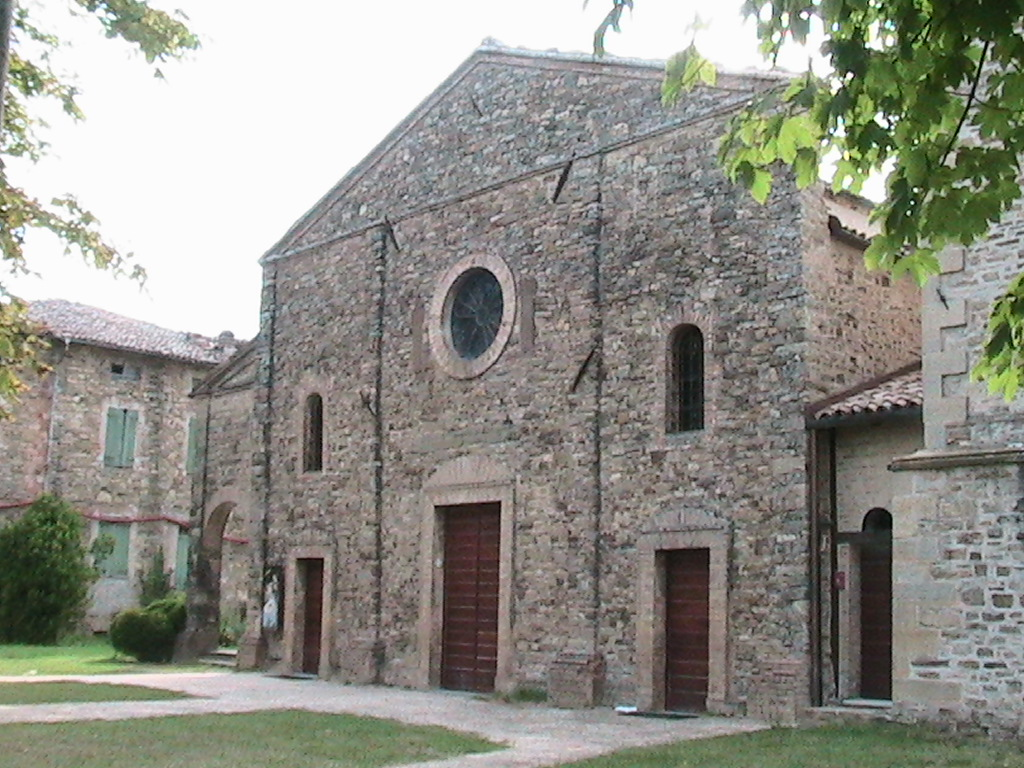
The facade of the church

Pieve di Sant’Ambrogio is a Romanesque-style, Roman Catholic parish church or pieve located in the neighborhood of Bazzano in Neviano degli Arduini in the region of Emilia Romagna, Italy.

== History ==
A church at the site is documented since 920 and was documented in 1004 as a pieve, able to confer baptism. The church still has a sculpted octagonal baptismal font from that era.

By the 12th century, the church had assumed the three-nave layout. Investigations have suggested the original apse was located where the facade now lies, an inversion occurring with a reconstruction in the 17th century. Chapels were added to the church in the 18th and 19th centuries.
