= Zhu Fatai =

Chinese scholar (320–387)

Zhu Fatai (Chinese: 竺法汰; pinyin: Zhú Fǎtài; Cantonese Yale: Chu1 Faat3 Taai3; AD 320 – 387) was a Chinese Buddhist scholar of the Jin dynasty. He was a disciple of Dao'an and Fotucheng in the ancient city of Ye and taught at Jiankang.

== Biography ==
Born 320, he moved to Jiankang from what is now Yishui in Shandong. As a young man, he had studied with Dao'an at Ye under monk Fotu Cheng. Following his time under Fotucheng, he left Ye in or around 349 and followed Dao'an on his wanderings through the northern and central provinces. Dao'an and his followers were forced to flee to Xiangyang in 365; Dao'an sent Fatai to Jiankang. En route to Jiankang, Fatai fell ill and was treated by the governor of the region, Huan Huo, in Jingzhou, at which several of the disciples held heated debates about the theory of the non-existence of conscious thought; this topic would feature later in Zhu Fatai's only surviving writings.

Zhu Fatai lived in Jiankang during the same period as Zhu Sengfu (c. 300–370), another Buddhist master and teacher who had arrived in Jiankang as a refugee from the north. Zhu Fatai arrived at Waguan Temple (瓦官寺; Waguansi) around 365 AD with over forty disciples and was greatly influenced by Zhu Sengfu. Zhu Fatai's public discussions and lectures of the Prajnaparamita were so popular that they were attended by Emperor Jianwen of Jin, other high nobles and courtiers, and thousands of other people from across the region.

Like Dao'an, Zhu Fatai had an interest in monastic life; under his organization, Waguan grew from a small temple to one of the largest and most important monasteries in Jiankang. Zhu Fatai resided at Waguan for two decades, where he was one of the most well respected and well connected scholars and monks in the capital.

=== Legacy ===
As students of secular works, Zhu Fatai's disciples included Tanyi and Tan'er, both experts of Laozi and I Ching. One of his early students was a young Daosheng, one of the foremost scholars of his lifetime. Zhu Fatai was also the teacher of Zhu Daoyi (d. 401), who founded the Huahu school.
