= Pieve di Sasso, Neviano degli Arduini =

Roman Catholic church in Emilia-Romagna, Italy

Coordinates: 44.52607°N 10.28855°E

The Pieve di Sasso, also known as the Pieve di Santa Maria Assunta, is a Roman Catholic parish church located on a hill near Sasso, a hamlet near the town of Neviano degli Arduini, in Province of Parma, region of Emilia-Romagna, Italy. The 11th-century church is a notable example of Romanesque architecture.

== History ==
Documents from 1004 make note of a church called Sanctae Marie de Saxo. According to tradition, a new church was rebuilt atop this hill in 1082, commissioned by the Countess Matilde di Canossa. Further documents from 1230 make note of this church, which occupied a position on the pilgrimage route that included the Abbey of Linari. Over the centuries, the structure had become dilapidated, but underwent restoration from 1821 to 1846, including new internal pavement. In 1905, the roof was refurbished. An earthquake in 1920 damaged the structure. A belltower, built in a Romanesque design was erected in 1948. Further renovations occurred after 1950, constructing a new pulpit and main altar.

== Description ==
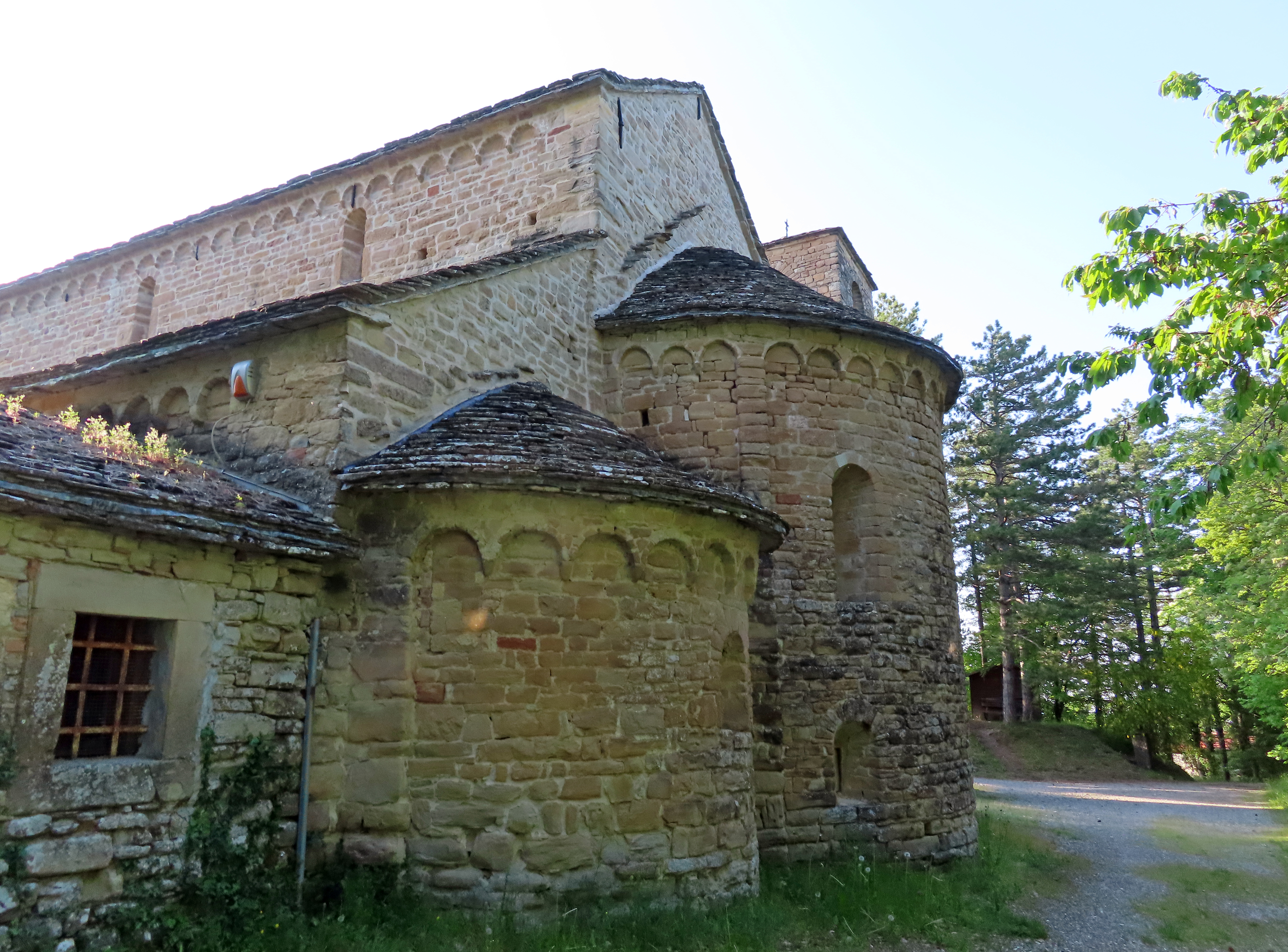
Apse

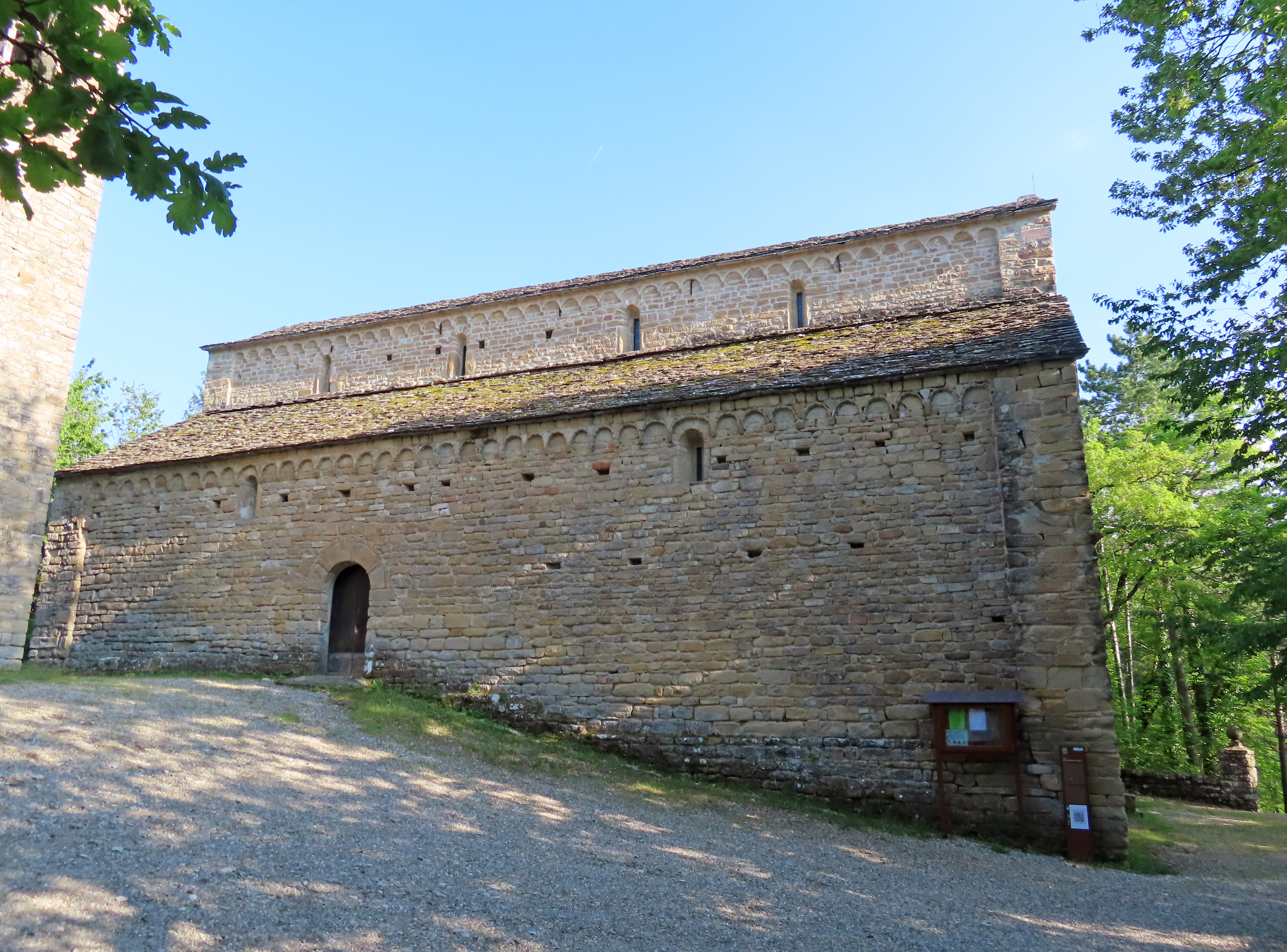
Northern flank

The church has three naves with an apse in the east. The facade is simple with an arched doorway. Above is a biphore window with a central column added during a refurbishment. Atop is a small Greek cross window. Along the flanks are narrow windows.

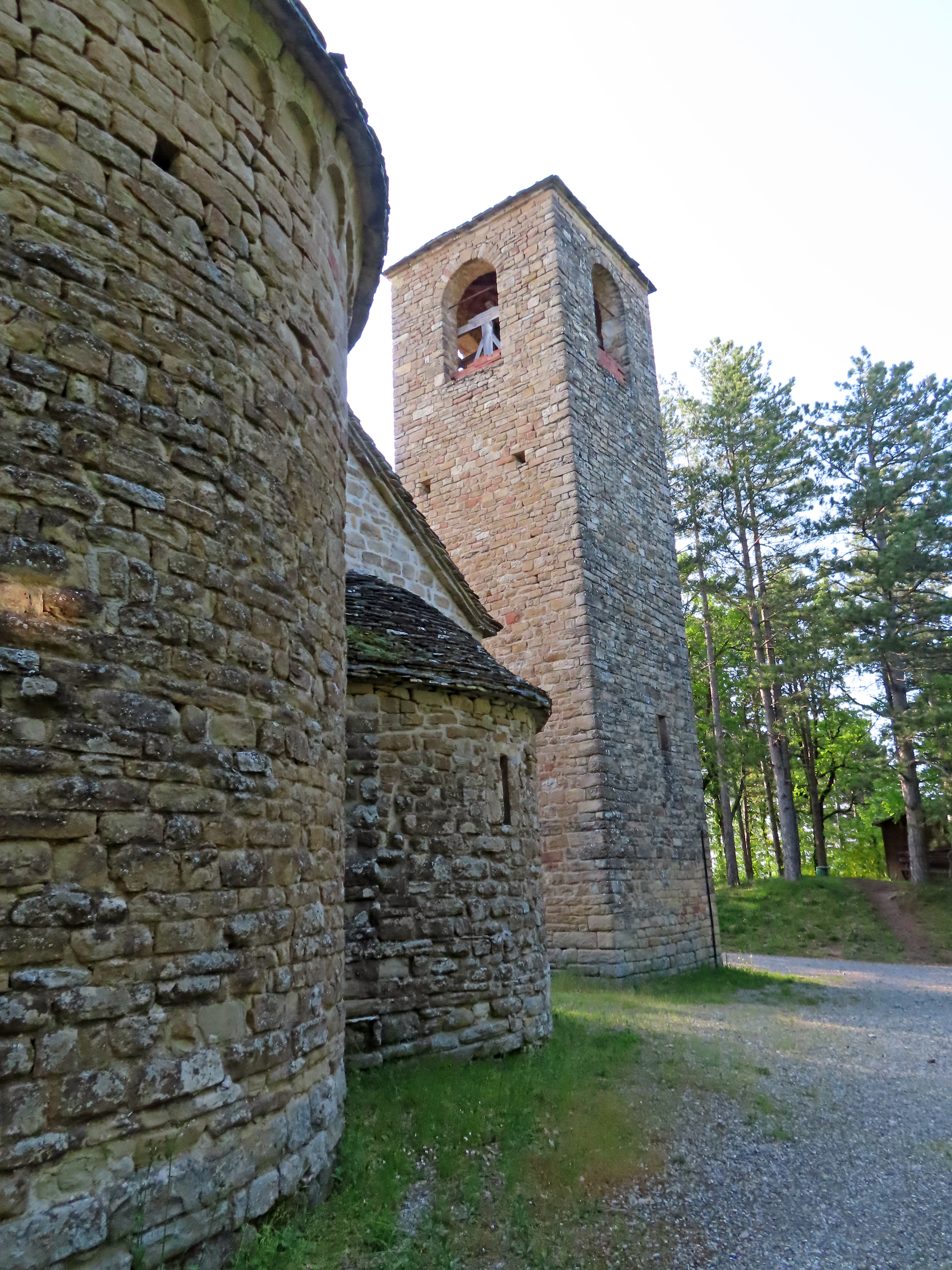
Apse and campanile

The baptismal font was renovated in 1960 using original stones. It has four panels with depictions representing the St Matthew, St March, a priest blessing and a Griffon and dove.

== Bibliography ==
- Federica Dallasta (2003). Centro studi delle Valli del Termina (ed.). La Pieve di Sasso e le sue sculture. Lupazzano di Neviano degli Arduini.
- Clara Rabinovici (2004). Battei (ed.). Le pievi del parmense. Parma.
