= Memoirs of Eminent Monks =

Compilation of biographies of monks

The Memoirs of Eminent Monks (Chinese: 高僧傳; pinyin: Gāosēng Zhuàn), also known as the Biographies of Eminent Monks, is a compilation of biographies of monks in China by Hui Jiao 慧皎 of Jiaxiang Temple in Kuaiji Mountain, Zhejiang c. 530 from the introduction of Buddhism to China up to the Liang Dynasty. Hui Jiao explains himself that the title is supposed to draw a contrast with monks who are famous but not eminent - an allusion to the lost work of his contemporary Baochang, Míngsēng zhuàn 名僧傳 (= Biographies of Famous Monks).

The manuscript is 14 scrolls in length with the preface given in Scroll 14. It contains 257 major biographies, arranged in ten categories: (1) translators of scripture/ sutras 譯經 (yijing), (2) expounders of righteousness 義解 (yijie), (3) monks of miraculous spirit 神異 (shenyi), (4) practitioners of meditation 習禪 (xichan), (5) experts in the vinaya 明律 (minglu), (6) those who give up their bodies 遺身 (yishen), (7) chanters of scripture/ sutras 誦經 (songjing), (8) those bringing happiness and fortune 興福(xingfu), (9) masters of scripture/ sutras 經師 (jingshi), and (10) leaders of chanting 唱導(changdao). Hui Jiao also lists 259 minor biographies. The text includes the biographies of An Shi Gao, Kumārajīva, Faxian, Dao An, Fotudeng, and others. Hui Jiao used a wide range of other biographies, some of which are still extant, and this makes the way he shaped his stories highly revealing of his historical method and ideals.

== See also ==
- Theragatha
- Therigatha
- Chinese Buddhism
