= Taoist Church of Italy =

The Taoist Church of Italy (TCI for short; in Italian: Chiesa Taoista d'Italia, "CTI" for short) is a religious body of Taoism established in 2013 by Vincenzo di Ieso, a fourteenth-generation Taoist master of the Xuanwu school of the Wudang Mountains (武当玄武派 Wǔdāng Xuánwǔ pài), into which he was initiated in 1993 with the ecclesiastical name of Li Xuanzong. Despite the founder's particular affiliation, the church intends to incorporate all forms of Taoism in Italy. The establishment of the church has been defined by a scholar of religious rights as a "crucial event for both Taoism and religious freedom in Italy".

== History ==
After an earlier experience as the "Taoist Association of Italy" (Associazione Taoista d’Italia) in the 1990s, master Vincenzo di Ieso—Li Xuanzong ordained the first Italian disciples into Taoist priesthood in 2010, then formally constituting the Taoist Church of Italy on 14 November 2013.

The statute of the organization is "designed according to Italian regulations and in the perspective of a future agreement with the state" (under article 8 of the Constitution of Italy, the Italian state officially recognizes a number of religious bodies through legal agreements). The Taoist Church of Italy would be the "first case in the world of a Taoist institution adopting such a type of confessional organization", according to the description given by the Italian CESNUR. At its dawn in China, however, Taoism organized itself into communitarian-confessional experiences, to develop in later centuries merely as an ensemble of ritual traditions exercised by priestly lineages (transmitted generation by generation or by ordination) and monastic orders. Such character is maintained in contemporary China, where those who qualify for the title of "Taoist" are only the initiates of priestly and monastic orders, who exert their sacerdotal function within the framework of Chinese folk religion.

== Organization ==
According to the statute of the church, "adherents" are all those members who are not "Taoists", that is to say all those members who have not formally undertaken any Taoist religious engagement and yet participate, even temporarily, to the activities of the church.

The Taoist Church of Italy, which is recognized by the Chinese Taoist Association, makes a distinction between its lay members and its sacerdotal body in accordance with the Chinese Taoist tradition. Only the members of the sacerdotal body, whether novices or already ordained ones, may call themselves "Taoists" in the Chinese acceptation of the term (that is daoshi, literally "masters of the Tao").

All lay members may have access to the novitiate, formally choosing to apply Taoist ethical principles into their own life. Through an initiation, members may pass from the degree of adherents to that of novices, and thenceforth they may attend the courses of the Higher Academy of Taoist Education. If novices are then accepted as disciples by a master (shifu), a fully ordained priest, they may take the vows and be ordained themselves as daoshi.

=== Priests and monks ===
In the Taoist Church of Italy, "Taoists" or "actual Taoists" are all the novices and fully ordained priests. They guide the church (that is the body formed by all adherents) exerting liturgical functions and spiritual assistance. Newly ordained priests are formally appointed as "daoshi" by the Taoist Holy Ecclesiastical College, whose members confer on them the "License for the Ministerial Exercise of Taoist Liturgy" and inscribe them into the "Public Register of the Taoist Clergy". The newly ordained clergymen may choose, in accordance with their own vocation, to be simply priests with the possibility of getting married, or monks taking the vow of chastity. Thus, the Taoist Church of Italy embodies both the priestly and the monastic traditions of Taoism, which in China are respectively represented by the "Right Unity" orders (正一道 Zhèngyīdào) and by the "Full Truth" orders (全真道 Quánzhēndào). According to the statute of the church, there is no substantial difference between the two orders, being both equated in training and functions.

=== Higher Academy of Taoist Education ===
The Higher Academy of Taoist Education is a school of university level. It works under the aegis of the Chinese Taoist Association organizing three-year courses for training Taoist novices in the theory, liturgy and energetic medicine of Taoism.

=== Taoist Holy Ecclesiastical College ===
The Taoist Holy Ecclesiastical College is a body of daoshi whose number may vary based on the needs of the occasion and on the numerical consistency of the entire clergy of the Taoist Church of Italy. Only those clergymen who are forty years of age and who have matured at least five years of religious activity may enter the college, although clergymen who do not meet such requirements and yet have matured exceptional merits may be admitted too into it. The Holy College is directed by a prior, a primus inter pares. The Holy College remains in office for four years and the constituent members may not receive more than two mandates.

== Statistics ==
According to the most recent data relative to the year 2014, provided by the Taoist Church of Italy to the CESNUR, the church is composed of 403 lessons’ attendants, 352 participants, 83 novices and 16 fully ordained "Taoists" (daoshi).
