= Gran Sasso (disambiguation) =

Gran Sasso is Gran Sasso d'Italia, the highest mountain in central Italy.

Gran Sasso may also refer to:

- Isola del Gran Sasso d'Italia, a town in Italy near the mountain
- Gran Sasso e Monti della Laga National Park, which surrounds the town and mountain
- Laboratori Nazionali del Gran Sasso, the largest underground laboratory in the world, under the midpoint of the tunnel

== See also ==
- Capannelle Pass, passes near the Gran Sasso in the Apennines, Italy
