= Madonna del Sasso =

Madonna del Sasso may refer to:

- Madonna del Sasso, Piedmont, a municipality in Italy
- Madonna del Sasso, Switzerland, a sanctuary
