= Yinxi =

Legendary figure of Zhou China

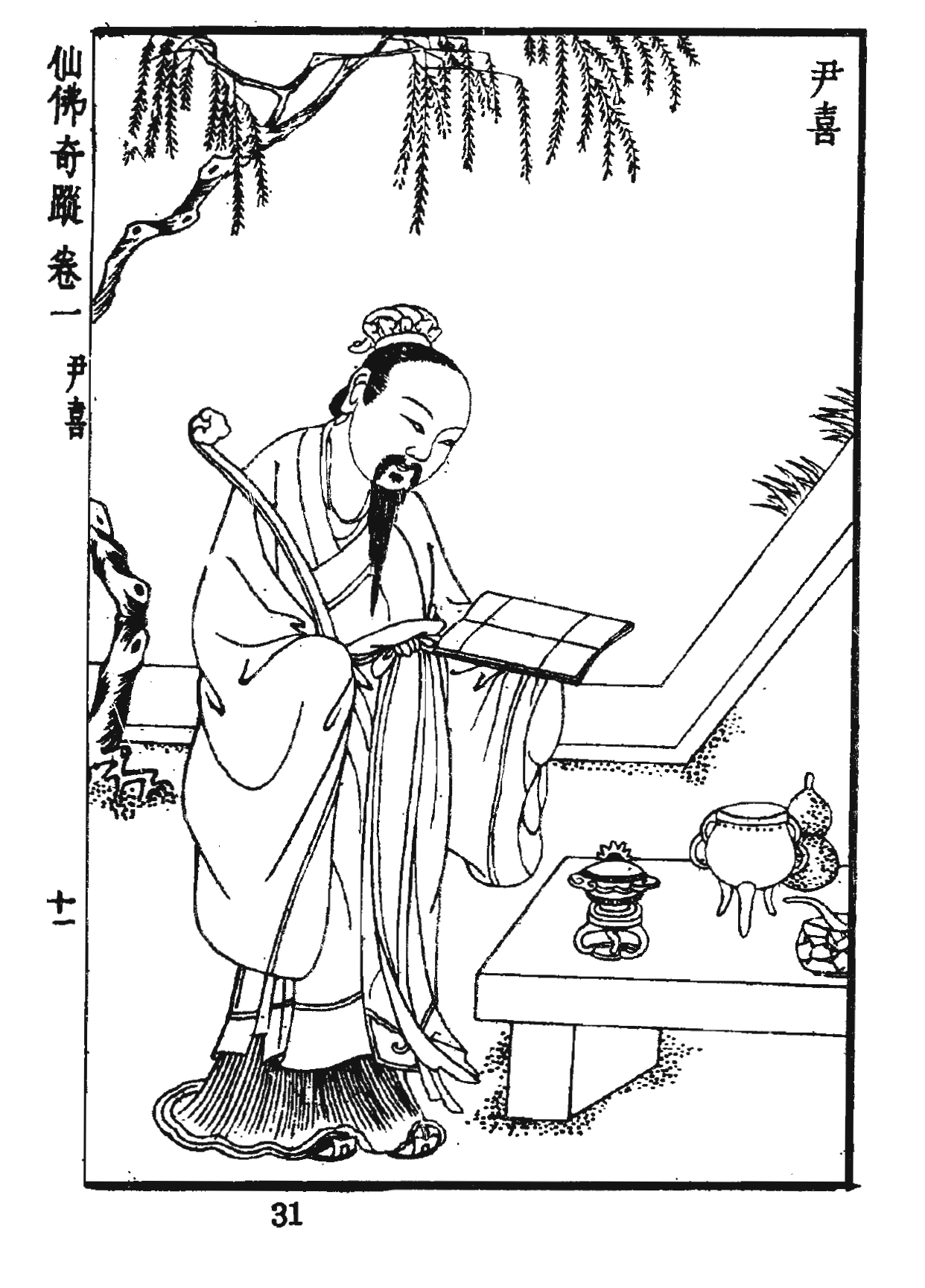
A portrait of Yinxi

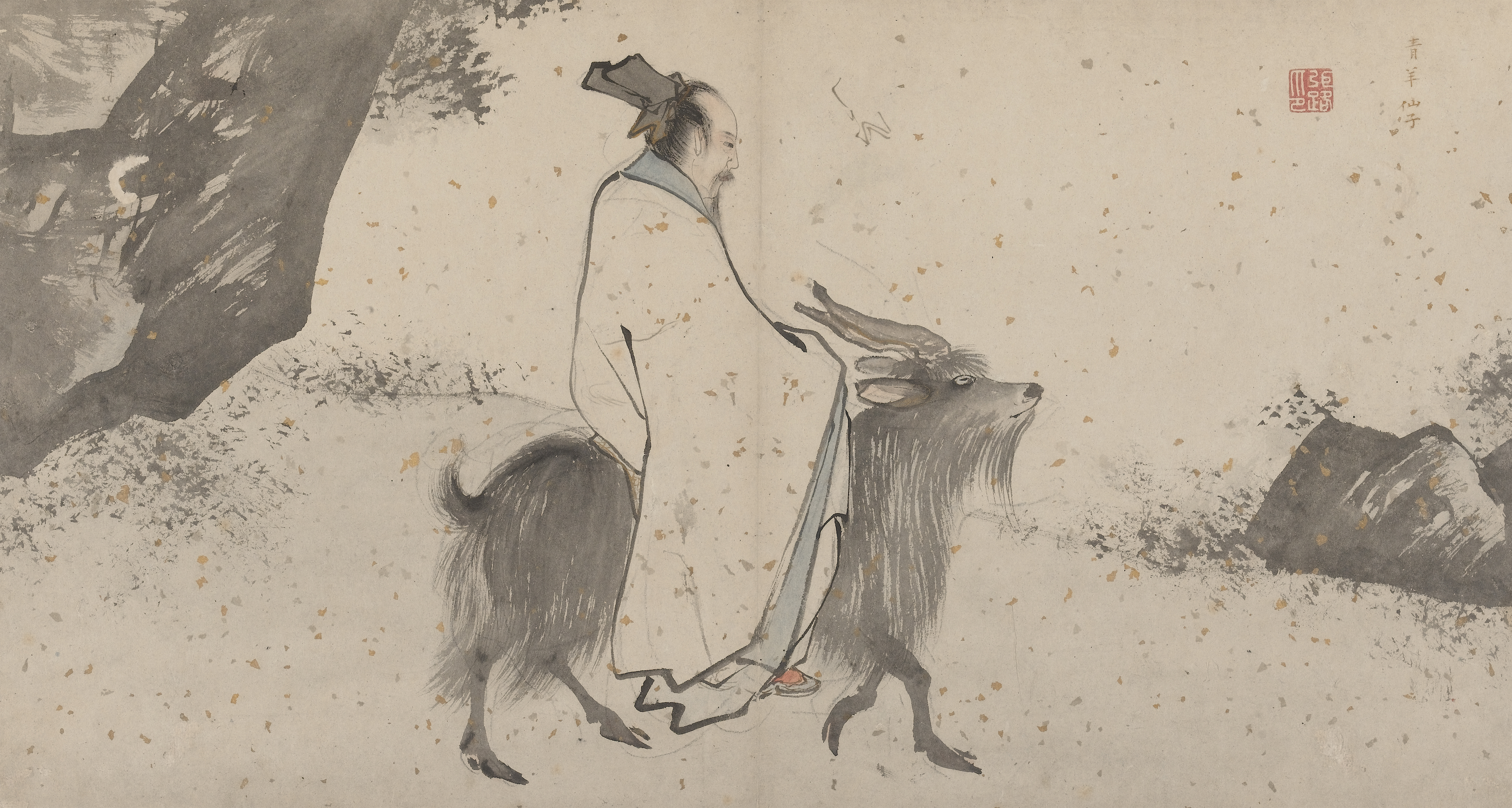
Yinxi, the "Blue-green ram Transcendent" (Qingyang xian, 青羊仙), painting by Zhang Lu (1464–1538)

Yinxi, formerly romanized as Yin-hsi (Chinese: 尹喜; pinyin: Yǐn xǐ), was a legendary figure of Zhou China. He was said to have been a guard at the western gate of the Zhou capital Chengzhou (present-day Luoyang) or, alternatively, at the western pass out of the Luo–Yi valley. His own wisdom caused him to halt Laozi on his way through the gate and, supposedly, he successfully importuned the sage to compose the Tao Te Ching before permitting him to pass.

He later wrote a book called Guan Yi which is of profound knowledge and revered by future scholars. He was also considered an ancient sage later on.

His own book, the Perfect Classic of the Beginning of the Scripture of the Supreme Way (無上妙道文始真經; Wushang miaodao wenshi zhenjing) was lost in the Han period, and later versions were considered to be forgeries.
