= Fotu Cheng =

Buddhist monk in 3rd/4th century China

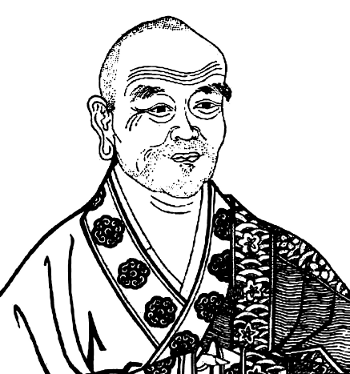
- Illustration of Fotu Cheng from a Chinese print
- Born: 232 CE; Kucha
- Died: 13 January 349; Ye, Later Zhao
- Occupations: Buddhist monk, scholar, missionary, political analyst, and translator

Fotu Cheng (Sanskrit: Buddhacinga?; simplified Chinese: 佛图澄; traditional Chinese: 佛圖澄; pinyin: Fótú Chéng; ca. 232 – 13 January 349) was a Buddhist monk and missionary from Kucha. He studied in Kashmir and arrived in the Western Jin capital Luoyang in 310 CE, and was active in the spread of Buddhism in China during the Later Zhao dynasty of the Sixteen Kingdoms period.

== Life ==
=== Early life ===
Fotu Cheng came from Kucha to the Western Jin dynasty in 310 CE and propagated Buddhism widely. He is said to have demonstrated many spiritual powers and was able to convert the warlords in this region of China over to Buddhism. He succeeded in converting the Jie warlord Shi Le and became Shi's closest advisor as he founded the Later Zhao dynasty in 319 CE. Fotu Cheng uttered the only phrase that reached us in the Jie language, cited in connection with Shi Le's successful war against Liu Yao of the Han-Zhao dynasty in 328 CE, and recorded in the Chinese annals in Chinese transcription with a Chinese translation. This phrase was analyzed in several publications.

=== As a teacher of meditation ===
Fotu Cheng is well known for his teaching methods of meditation, especially ānāpānasmṛti ("mindfulness of breathing"). Fotu Cheng widely taught ānāpānasmṛti through methods of counting breaths, so as to temper the breathing, simultaneously focusing the mind into a state of peaceful meditative concentration (Skt. samādhi). By teaching meditation methods as well as doctrine, Fotu Cheng popularized Buddhism quickly. According to Nan Huai-Chin, "Besides all its theoretical accounts of emptiness and existence, Buddhism also offered methods for genuine realization of spiritual powers and meditative concentration that could be relied upon. This is the reason that Buddhism began to develop so vigorously in China with Fotu Cheng."

=== Legacy and successors ===
Eventually, Fotu Cheng became a Later Zhao government official under Shi Hu, who allowed him to found a great number of Buddhist temples. Among his disciples were Dao An, Zhu Faya, Zhu Fatai, Fa-he and Fa-ch'ang. These disciples had a great impact on Buddhism in China, and continued to revere the memory of their teacher. In his history of China, John Keay writes:

Fotu Deng's [Cheng's] disciples would include some of Chinese Buddhism's most outstanding scholars. When the Later Zhao kingdom fell apart in 349 — four princes were enthroned and murdered in that year alone — Fotudeng's disciples fanned out across the north from Shandong to Sichuan and gravitated south as far as Guangdong. One of them, the monk Dao'an, became the greatest exponent, translator, and organiser in the early history of Chinese Buddhism; and of his disciples several assisted Kumarajiva, another native of Kuqa, in the most ambitious of all translation projects in terms of quantity and fidelity. Yet all such luminaries continued to revere Fotudeng's memory, which would suggest that he was more than a mere showman and miracle-worker.

== See also ==
- Silk Road transmission of Buddhism
- Buddhism in Central Asia
