= Laozi =

Semi-legendary Chinese philosopher, founder of Taoism

Laozi; 老子
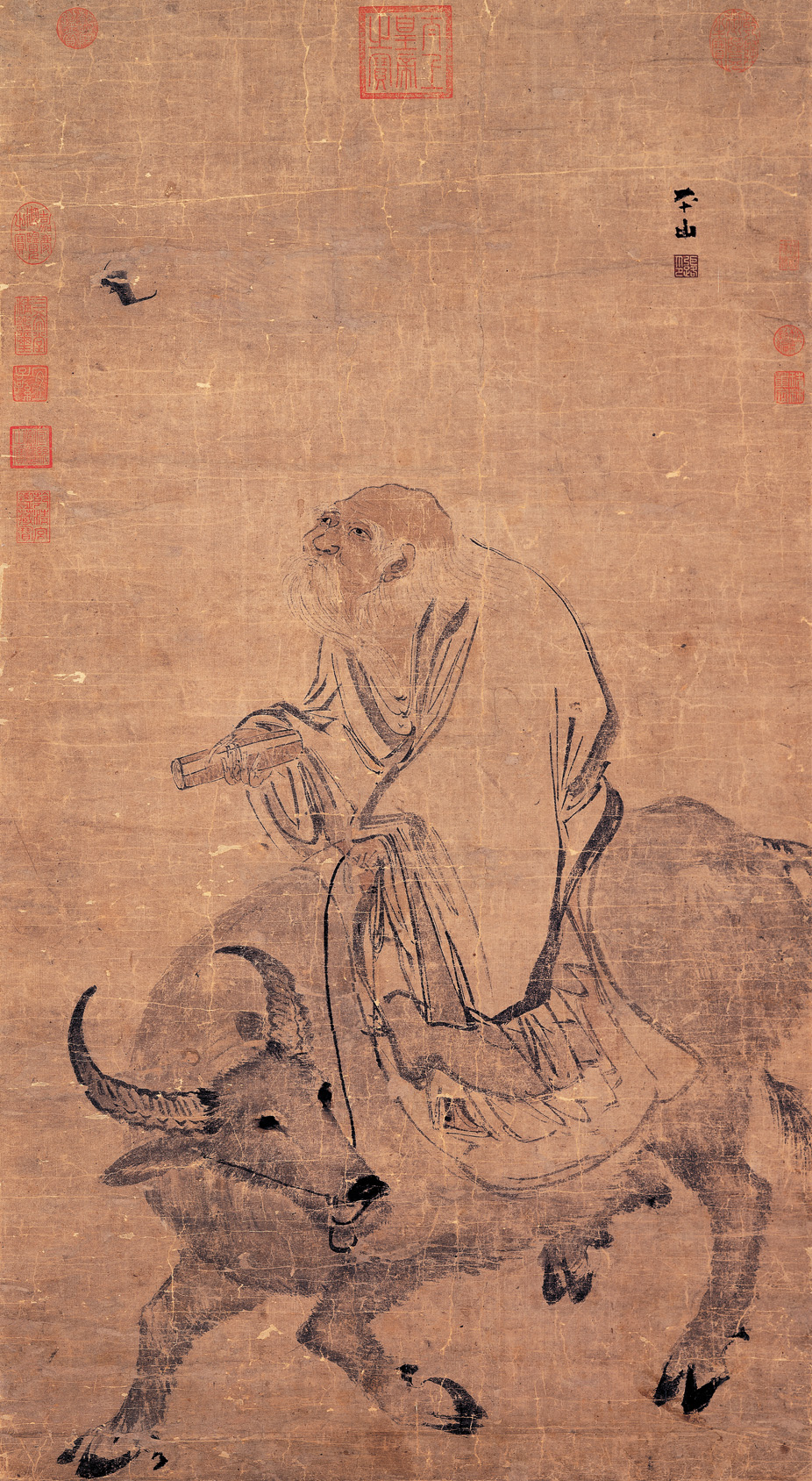
- Ming era portrait by Zhang Lu
- Born: trad. 6th century BC, sometimes dated 4th century BC; Quren Village, Chu (present-day Luyi, Henan)
- Died: trad. 5th century BC

Philosophical work
- Era: Ancient philosophy
- Region: Chinese philosophy
- School: Taoism
- Notable works: Dao De Jing
- Notable ideas: Tao; Wu wei

Laozi
- "Laozi" in Chinese seal script (top)and regular script (bottom)

Honorific
- Chinese: 老子
- Hanyu Pinyin: Lǎozǐ
- Literal meaning: "Old Master"
Transcriptions
Standard Mandarin
- Hanyu Pinyin: Lǎozǐ
- Bopomofo: ㄌㄠˇ ㄗˇ
- Wade–Giles: Lao^{3}-tzŭ^{3}
- Tongyong Pinyin: Lǎo-zǐh
- Yale Romanization: Lǎudž
- IPA: [làʊ.tsɹ̩̀]
Wu
- Suzhounese: Lao^{6}-tsy^{3}
Yue: Cantonese
- Yale Romanization: Lóuhjí
- Jyutping: Lou5-zi2
- IPA: [lɔw˩˧ tsi˧˥]
Southern Min
- Hokkien POJ: Ló-chú
- Tâi-lô: Ló-tsú
Old Chinese
- Baxter–Sagart (2014): C.rˤuʔ tsəʔ

Personal name
- Chinese: 李耳
- Hanyu Pinyin: Lǐ Ěr
Transcriptions
Standard Mandarin
- Hanyu Pinyin: Lǐ Ěr
- Wade–Giles: Li^{3} Erh^{3}
- Tongyong Pinyin: Lǐ Ěr
- IPA: [lì àɚ]
Old Chinese
- Baxter–Sagart (2014): C.rəʔ C.nəʔ

Courtesy name
- Traditional Chinese: 李伯陽
- Simplified Chinese: 李伯阳
- Hanyu Pinyin: Lǐ Bóyáng
Transcriptions
Standard Mandarin
- Hanyu Pinyin: Lǐ Bóyáng
- Bopomofo: ㄌㄧˇ ㄅㄛˊ ㄧㄤˊ
- Wade–Giles: Li^{3} Po^{2}-yang^{2}
- Tongyong Pinyin: Lǐ Bó-yáng
- IPA: [lì pwǒ.jǎŋ]
Old Chinese
- Baxter–Sagart (2014): C.rəʔ pˤrak laŋ

Posthumous name
- Chinese: 李聃; 老聃
- Hanyu Pinyin: Lǐ Dān; Lǎo Dān
Transcriptions
Standard Mandarin
- Hanyu Pinyin: Lǐ Dān; Lǎo Dān
- Bopomofo: ㄌㄧˇ ㄉㄢ; ㄌㄠˇ ㄉㄢ
- Wade–Giles: Li^{3} Tan^{1}; Lao^{3} Tan^{1}
- Tongyong Pinyin: Lǐ Dan; Lǎo Dan
- IPA: [lì tán]; [làʊ tán]

Theonym
- Chinese: 老君
- Hanyu Pinyin: Lǎojūn
- Literal meaning: the Old Lord
Transcriptions
Standard Mandarin
- Hanyu Pinyin: Lǎojūn
- Bopomofo: ㄌㄠˇ ㄐㄩㄣ
- Wade–Giles: Lao^{3}-chün^{1}
- Tongyong Pinyin: Lǎo-jyun
- IPA: [làʊ.tɕýn]

Japanese name
- Kanji: 老子
- Hiragana: ろうし
- Katakana: ロウシ
Transcriptions
- Revised Hepburn: Rōshi
- Kunrei-shiki: Rousi

Laozi (variously spelled; /ˌlaʊ.ˈtsʌ/, low-TSUH; Chinese: 老子; pinyin: Lǎozǐ) was a legendary Chinese philosopher considered to be the author of the Tao Te Ching (Pinyin: Dào Dé Jīng), one of the foundational texts of Taoism. Modern scholarship generally regards his biographical details as later inventions and his opus a collaboration of various writers, with the name Laozi, literally meaning 'Old Master', likely intended to portray an archaic anonymity that could converse with Confucianism. Traditional accounts addend him as Li Er, born in the 6th-century BC state of Chu during China's Spring and Autumn period (c. 770 – c. 481 BC). Serving as the royal archivist for the Zhou court at Wangcheng (modern Luoyang), he met and impressed Confucius (c. 551 – c. 479 BC).

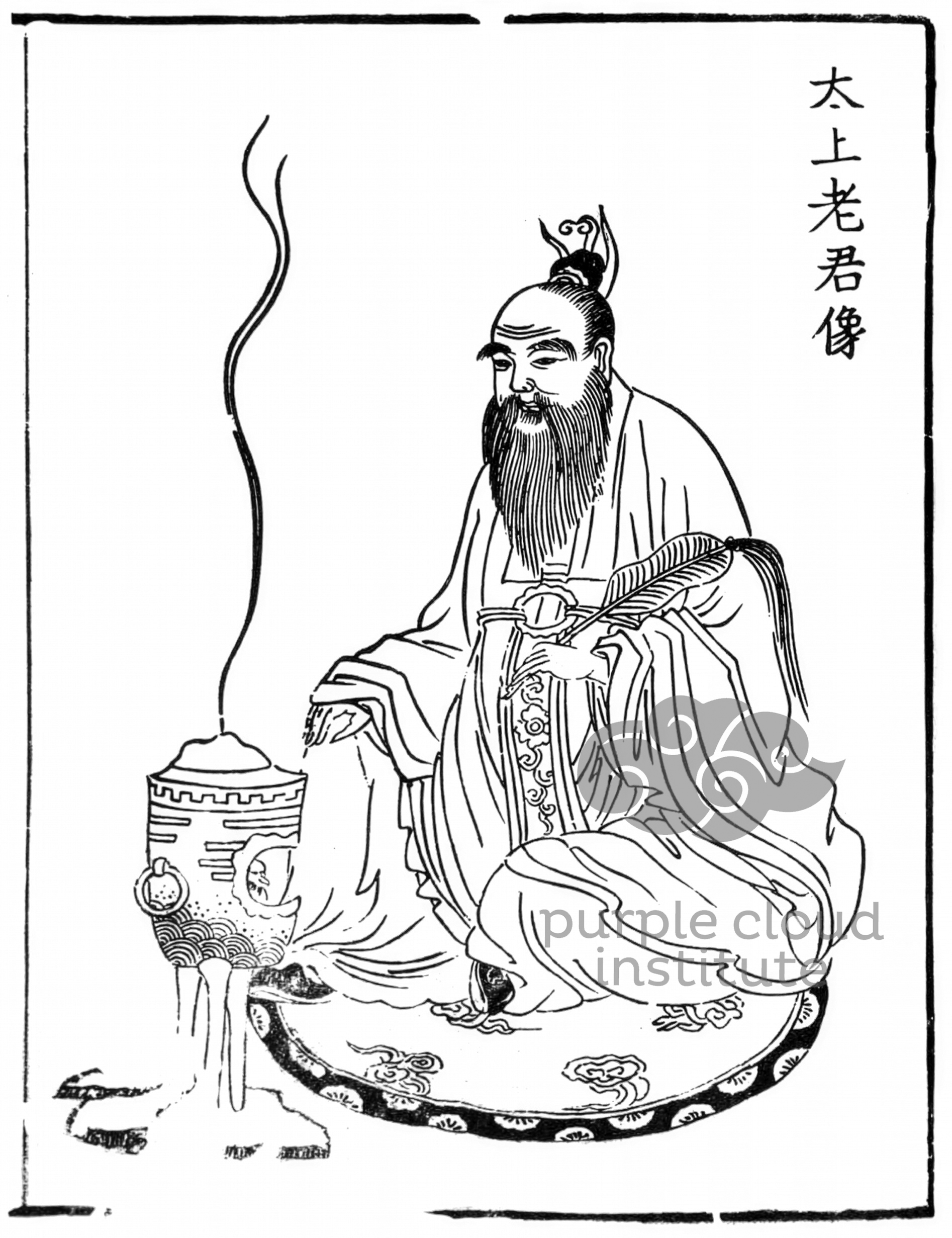
Laozi, sat afore his cauldron; the top-right corner inscription reads "Impression of Taishang Laojun"

A central figure in Chinese culture, Laozi is generally considered the founder of Taoism. He was claimed and revered as the ancestor of the Tang dynasty (618–907) and is similarly honored in modern China as the progenitor of the popular surname Li. In some sects of Taoism, Chinese Buddhism, Confucianism, and Chinese folk religion, it is held that he then became an immortal hermit. Certain Taoist devotees held that the Dào Dé Jīng was the avatar – embodied as a book – of the god Laojun, one of the Three Pure Ones of the Taoist pantheon, though few philosophers believe this.

The Dào Dé Jīng had a profound influence on Chinese religious movements and on subsequent Chinese philosophers, who annotated, commended, and criticized the texts extensively. In the 20th century, textual criticism by historians led to theories questioning Laozi's timing or even existence, positing that the received text of the Dào Dé Jīng was not composed until the Warring States period (c. 475 – 221 BC), and was the product of multiple authors.

== Name ==
Lǎozǐ is the pinyin romanization of 老子, a name with various romanized spellings, such as Laotse, Lao Tzu, Lao-Tze, etc., and various pronunciations in English. It is not a personal name, but rather an honorific title or epithet, essentially meaning 'old teacher' or 'venerable master'. Its structure, with zǐ in the second syllable, matches that of other ancient Chinese philosophers, such as Kongzi (Confucius), Mengzi, and Zhuangzi.

Traditional accounts give Laozi the personal name Li Er (李耳, Lǐ Ěr), whose Old Chinese pronunciation has been reconstructed as *C.rəʔ C.nəʔ. Li is a common Chinese surname which also has the meaning 'plum' or 'plum tree' when used as a common noun; there is a legend tying Laozi's birth to a plum tree. Laozi has long been identified with the persona Lao Dan (老聃, Lǎo Dān). Dan similarly means "Long-Ear" or "the Long-Eared One". The character 耳 is the Chinese word for 'ear'.

Laozi is recorded bearing the courtesy name Boyang (伯陽, Bóyáng), whose Old Chinese pronunciation has been reconstructed as *pˤrak laŋ. The character 伯 was the title of the eldest son born to the primary wife, or an uncle of the father's family who was older than one's father, also used as a noble title indicating an aristocratic lineage head with rulership over a small to medium domain, and as a general mark of respect. The character 陽 is yang, the solar and masculine life force in Taoist belief. Lao Dan seems to have been used more generally, however, including by Sima Qian in his Shiji (c. 91 BC), in the Zhuangzi, and by some modern scholars.

== Identity ==
By the mid-twentieth century, consensus had emerged among Western scholars that the historicity of a person known as Laozi is doubtful and that the Dào Dé Jīng is "a compilation of Taoist sayings by many hands", with an author being invented afterwards. While multiple authorship over time is typical for early Chinese texts, the book's conspicuous absence of a central Master figure places it in marked contrast with nearly all other early Chinese philosophical works.

As of 2024, the oldest manuscript containing text from the Dào Dé Jīng dates to the late 4th century BC, written on bamboo slips excavated as part of the Guodian Chu Slips. These passages correspond with roughly one third of the received text, and some are placed in the same order. These are mixed in with passages not carried by the transmitted Dào Dé Jīng, indicating that its makeup was still undergoing revisions and modifications. The oldest manuscripts of the Dào Dé Jīng in a complete form by itself were discovered at a tomb in Mawangdui, and date to the early 2nd century BC. Analysis of early commentary on passages that appear in the received Dào Dé Jīng supports an accretionary evolution for the text rather than a singular authorship event.

=== Traditional accounts ===
The earliest biographical reference to Laozi is found in the 1st‑century BC Records of the Grand Historian by Sima Qian. Multiple accounts of Laozi's biography are presented, with Sima Qian expressing various levels of doubt in his sources.

In one account, Sima Qian reports that Laozi was said to be a contemporary of Confucius during the 6th or 5th century BC. His personal name was Er or Dan. He was born in the village of Quren (曲仁里, Qūrén lǐ) in the southern state of Chu, within present-day Luyi in Henan. He was said to be the son of the Censor-in-Chief of the Zhou dynasty and Lady Yishou (益壽氏), and was a scholar who worked as the Keeper of the Archives for the royal Zhou court. This reportedly allowed him broad access to the works of the Yellow Emperor and other classics of the time, and he wrote a book in two parts before departing to the west.

In another, Laozi was a different contemporary of Confucius called Lao Laizi (老莱子), one of the Twenty-four Filial Exemplars, and wrote a book in 15 parts. The story tells of Zong the Warrior who defeats an enemy and triumphs, and then abandons the corpses of the enemy soldiers to be eaten by vultures. By coincidence Laozi, traveling and teaching the way of the Tao, comes on the scene and is revealed to be the father of Zong, from whom he was separated in childhood. Laozi tells his son that it is better to treat respectfully a beaten enemy, and that the disrespect to their dead would cause his foes to seek revenge. Convinced, Zong orders his soldiers to bury the enemy dead. Funeral mourning is held for the dead of both parties and a lasting peace is made.

In a third, he was the court astrologer Lao Dan who lived during the 4th century BC reign of the Duke Xian of Qin who grew weary of the moral decay of life in Chengzhou and noted the kingdom's decline. He ventured west to live as a hermit in the unsettled frontier at the age of 80. At the western gate of the city (or kingdom), he was recognized by the guard Yinxi. The sentry asked the old master to record his wisdom for the good of the country before he would be permitted to pass. The text Laozi wrote was said to be the Dào Dé Jīng, although the present version of the text includes additions from later periods. In some versions of the tale, the sentry was so touched by the work that he became a disciple and left with Laozi, never to be seen again. In some later interpretations, the "Old Master" journeyed all the way to India and was the teacher of Siddartha Gautama, the Buddha. Others say he was the Buddha himself.

The stories assert that Laozi never opened a formal school but nonetheless attracted a large number of students and loyal disciples. There are many variations of a story retelling his encounter with Confucius, most famously in the Zhuangzi. A.C. Graham suggested that the Confucian version of the story presented in the Book of Rites was the original, which was borrowed and re-interpreted by the followers of Zhuang Zhou. His birthday is popularly held to be the 15th day of the second month of the Chinese calendar. In accounts where Laozi married, he was said to have had a son who became a celebrated soldier of Wei during the Warring States period.

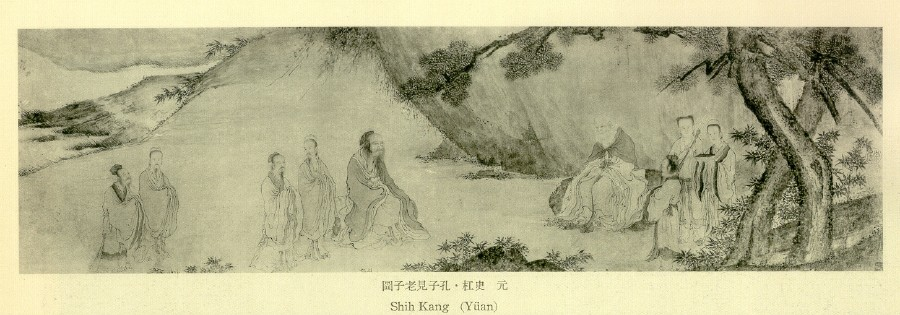
Confucius meets Laozi, Shi Gang (史杠), Yuan dynasty

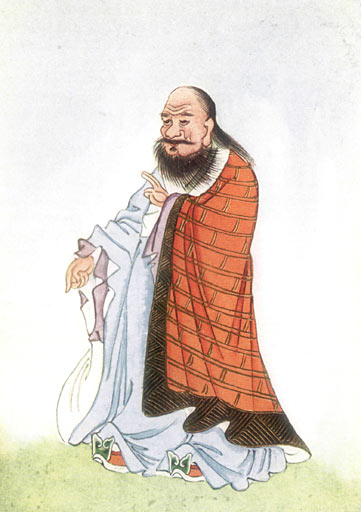
Depiction of Laozi in E. T. C. Werner's Myths and Legends of China

== Dào Dé Jīng ==
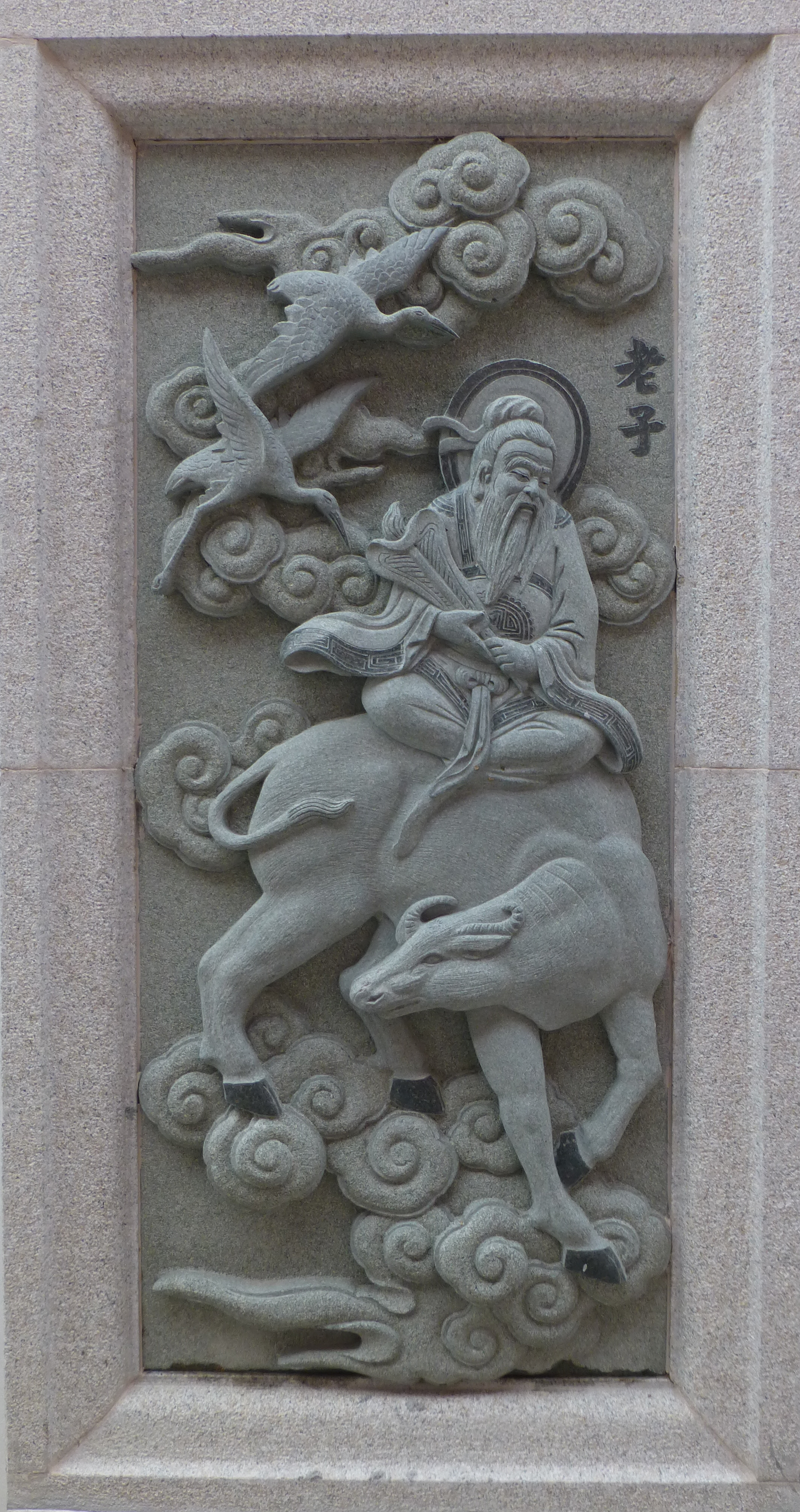
Carving of Laozi at Ping Sien Si Temple in Perak, Malaysia

The Dào Dé Jīng (or "Tao Te Ching", according to an older romanization) is one of the most significant treatises in Chinese cosmogony. It is often called the Laozi, and has always been associated with that name. The identity of the person or people who wrote or compiled the text has been the source of considerable speculation and debate throughout history. As with many works of ancient Chinese philosophy, ideas are often explained by way of paradox, analogy, appropriation of ancient sayings, repetition, symmetry, rhyme, and rhythm. The Dào Dé Jīng stands as an exemplar of this literary form. Unlike most works of its genre, the book conspicuously lacks a central "master" character and seldom references historical people or events, giving it an air of timelessness.

The Dào Dé Jīng describes the Tao as the source and ideal of all existence: it is unseen, but not transcendent, immensely powerful yet supremely humble, being the root of all things. People have desires and free will (and thus are able to alter their own nature). Many act "unnaturally", upsetting the natural balance of the Tao. The Dào Dé Jīng intends to lead students to a "return" to their natural state, in harmony with Tao. Language and conventional wisdom are critically assessed. Taoism views them as inherently biased and artificial, widely using paradoxes to sharpen the point.

Wu wei, literally 'non-action' or 'not acting', is a central concept of the Dào Dé Jīng. The concept of wu wei is multifaceted, and reflected in the words' multiple meanings, even in English translation; it can mean "not doing anything", "not forcing", "not acting" in the theatrical sense, "creating nothingness", "acting spontaneously", and "flowing with the moment".

This concept is used to explain ziran, or harmony with the Tao. It includes the concepts that value distinctions are ideological and seeing ambition of all sorts as originating from the same source. Dào Dé Jīng used the term broadly with simplicity and humility as key virtues, often in contrast to selfish action. On a political level, it means avoiding such circumstances as war, harsh laws and heavy taxes. Some Taoists see a connection between wu wei and esoteric practices, such as zuowang ('sitting in oblivion': emptying the mind of bodily awareness and thought) found in the Zhuangzi.

Alan Chan provides an example of how Laozi encouraged a change in approach, or return to "nature", rather than action. Technology may bring about a false sense of progress. The answer provided by Laozi is not the rejection of technology, but instead seeking the calm state of wu wei, free from desires. This relates to many statements by Laozi encouraging rulers to keep their people in "ignorance", or "simple-minded". Some scholars insist this explanation ignores the religious context, and others question it as an apologetic of the philosophical coherence of the text. It would not be unusual political advice if Laozi literally intended to tell rulers to keep their people ignorant. However, some terms in the text, such as "valley spirit" (谷神, gǔshén) and 'soul' (魄, pò), bear a metaphysical context and cannot be easily reconciled with a purely ethical reading of the work.

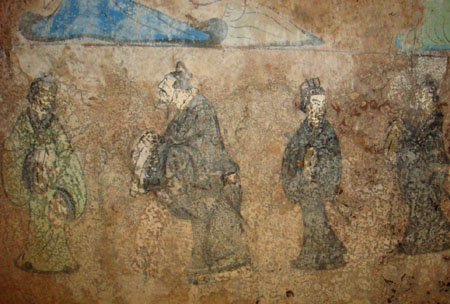
A Western Han fresco depicting Confucius and Laozi, from a tomb of Dongping County, Shandong, China

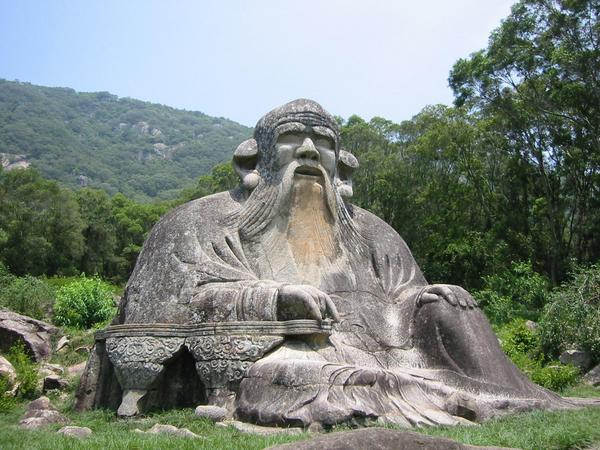
A stone sculpture of Laozi, located north of Quanzhou at the foot of Mount Qingyuan

== Influence ==
Potential officials throughout Chinese history drew on the authority of non-Confucian sages, especially Laozi and Zhuangzi, to deny serving any ruler at any time. Zhuangzi, the other founder of Taoism, had a great deal of influence on Chinese literati and culture. Political theorists influenced by Laozi have advocated humility in leadership and a restrained approach to statecraft, either for ethical and pacifist reasons, or for tactical ends. In a different context, various antiauthoritarian movements have embraced Laozi's teachings on the power of the weak.

=== Han dynasty ===
The story of Laozi has taken on strong religious overtones since the Han dynasty. As Taoism took root, Laozi was worshipped as a god. Belief in the revelation of the Tao from the divine Laozi resulted in the formation of the Way of the Celestial Masters, the first organized religious Taoist sect. In later Taoist tradition, Laozi came to be seen as a personification of the Tao. He is said to have undergone numerous "transformations" and taken on guises in various incarnations throughout history to initiate the faithful in the Way. Religious Taoism often holds that the "Old Master" did not disappear after writing the Dào Dé Jīng but rather spent his life traveling and revealing the Tao.

Taoist myths state that Laozi was a virgin birth, conceived when his mother gazed upon a falling star. He supposedly remained in her womb for 62 years before being born while his mother was leaning against a plum tree. Laozi was said to have emerged as a grown man with a full grey beard and long earlobes, both symbols of wisdom and long life. Other myths state that he was reborn 13 times after his first life during the days of Fuxi. In his last incarnation as Laozi, he lived 990 years and spent his life traveling to reveal the Tao.

=== Tang dynasty ===
Due to his traditional name Li Er, Laozi has been venerated as the ancestor of all subsequent Lis, and many clans of the Li family trace their descent to Laozi, including the emperors of the Tang dynasty. This family was known as the Longxi Li lineage (隴西李氏). According to the Simpkinses, while many (if not all) of these lineages are questionable, they provide a testament to Laozi's impact on Chinese culture. Under the Tang, Laozi received a series of temple names of increasing grandeur. In the year 666, Emperor Gaozong named Laozi the "Supremely Mysterious and Primordial Emperor" (太上玄元皇帝, Tàishàng Xuán Yuán Huángdì). In 743, Emperor Xuanzong declared him the "Sage Ancestor" (聖祖, Shèngzǔ) of the dynasty with the posthumous title of "Mysterious and Primordial Emperor" (玄元皇帝, Xuán Yuán Huángdì). Emperor Xuanzong also elevated Laozi's parents to the ranks of "Innately Supreme Emperor" (先天太上皇, Xiāntiān Tàishàng Huáng) and "Innate Empress" (先天太后, Xiāntiān Tàihòu). In 749, Laozi was further honored as the "Sage Ancestor and Mysterious and Primordial Emperor of the Great Way" (聖祖大道玄元皇帝, Shèngzǔ Dàdào Xuán Yuán Huángdì) and then, in 754, as the "Great Sage Ancestor and Mysterious and Primordial Heavenly Emperor and Great Sovereign of the Golden Palace of the High and Supreme Great Way" (大聖祖高上大道金闕玄元天皇大帝, Dà Shèngzǔ Gāo Shǎng Dàdào Jīnquē Xuán Yuán Tiānhuáng Dàdì).

A seventh-century work, the Sandong Zhunang (三洞珠囊; "Pearly Bag of the Three Caverns"), presents Laozi as the perfect Taoist master and a character named Yinxi as the ideal Taoist student. Yinxi follows a formal sequence of preparation, testing, training and attainment.

=== Siddhar ===
In the Siddhar tradition of India, the greatly revered Bhogar, one of the 18 esteemed Siddhars of yore, is believed to be Laozi and is of Chinese origin. His caste, from obscure references is noted to be "Cinatecakkuyavar" or Chinese potter. In his principal book of poetry, the Bhogar 7000, he tells of his travels to China to spread his ideas on spirituality, specifically on the topic of sublimating the sexual energies and using said energies to become self-realised, with a spiritually-minded partner. His jeeva samadhi can be found in the southwestern corridor of the Dhandayuthapani Swamy Temple, Palani, Tamil Nadu, India.

=== Contemporary ===
Many contemporary philosophers have seen Laozi as a proponent of limited government. The right-libertarian economist Murray Rothbard suggested that Laozi was the first libertarian, likening Laozi's ideas on government to Friedrich Hayek's theory of spontaneous order. James A. Dorn agreed, writing that Laozi, like many 18th-century liberals, "argued that minimizing the role of government and letting individuals develop spontaneously would best achieve social and economic harmony." Similarly, the Cato Institute's David Boaz includes passages from the Dào Dé Jīng in his 1997 book The Libertarian Reader and noted in an article for the Encyclopædia Britannica that Laozi advocated for rulers to "do nothing" because "without law or compulsion, men would dwell in harmony." Philosopher Roderick Long argues that libertarian themes in Taoist thought are actually borrowed from earlier Confucian writers.

The anarcho-syndicalist writer and activist Rudolf Rocker praised Laozi's "gentle wisdom" and understanding of the opposition between political power and the cultural activities of the people and community in his 1937 book Nationalism and Culture. In his 1910 article for the Encyclopædia Britannica, Peter Kropotkin also noted that Laozi was among the earliest proponents of essentially anarchist concepts. More recently, anarchists such as John P. Clark and Ursula K. Le Guin have written about the conjunction between anarchism and Taoism in various ways, highlighting the teachings of Laozi in particular. In her rendition of the Dào Dé Jīng, Le Guin writes that Laozi "does not see political power as magic. He sees rightful power as earned and wrongful power as usurped... He sees sacrifice of self or others as a corruption of power, and power as available to anyone who follows the Way. No wonder anarchists and Taoists make good friends."
