= Dao'an =

Chinese Buddhist monk and author (312–385)

- 道安
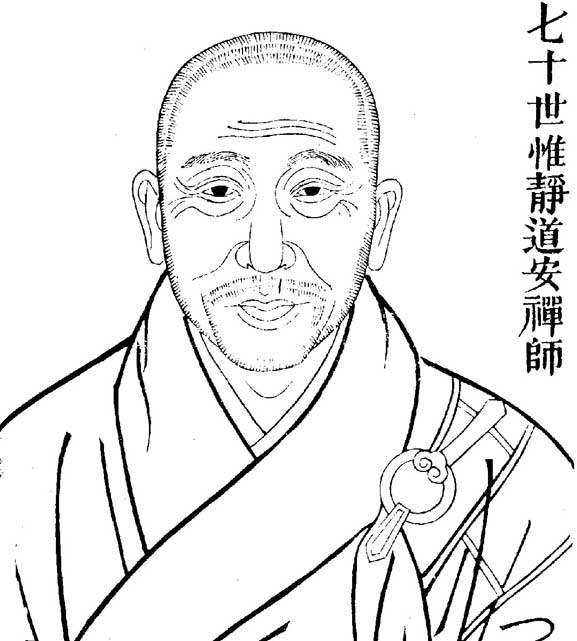

Personal life
- Born: 312 Jizhou District, Hengshui, Hebei, China
- Died: 385 (aged 72–73) Chang'an, Shaanxi, China

Religious life
- Religion: Buddhism
- Temple: White Horse Temple; Tanxi Temple; Wuchong Temple (379–385)
- Dharma name: Dao'an

Senior posting
- Teacher: Fotucheng (佛圖澄)
- Students: Huiyuan Huichi

Dao'an (Chinese: 道安; pinyin: Dào'ān; Wade–Giles: Tao-an; 312–385) was a Buddhist monk, author and bibliographer during the Eastern Jin dynasty. He was from what is now Hebei. His main achievement was that of overseer of translation of Buddhist texts into Chinese, organizer of the Chinese sangha, author of exegetical works and compiler of the most important early catalogue of Chinese Buddhist translation in 374. Although this catalogue is itself lost, Sengyou reproduces much of it in his catalogue (T2145), which was completed in 515.

Dao'an is widely regarded as the founding figure of the Maitreya cult in China.

== Life ==
According to his traditional biography, after the loss of his parents he was raised by an elder cousin. Dao'an left home to join the monastic order at twelve. Ca. 335 CE he visited Linzhang and became a disciple of the famous Kuchean monk and missionary Fotudeng (232–348). One of his disciples was the monk Huiyuan, whose teachings inspired Pure Land Buddhism. He was active in Xiangyang until the Former Qin ruler Fu Jian captured the city in 379 and brought Dao'an to Chang'an. He spent the last years of life translating and interpreting scripture as well as compiling a catalogue of scriptures. He also advocated that all monks and nuns take Shi 釋 as a surname, from the first character of Gautama Buddha's title in Chinese, Shìjiāmóuní (Chinese: 釋迦牟尼 "Śākyamuni").

== Sources ==
- Zheng, Changji (2005). "The Tale of Master Yuan of Mount Lu". In Mair, Victor H.; Steinhardt, Nancy S.; Goldin, Paul R. (eds.). Hawai'i Reader in Traditional Chinese Culture. Translated by Sen, Tansen; Mair, Victor H. Honolulu: University of Hawai'i Press. pp. 304–339. ISBN 0824827856.
