= Quan Yi =

4th century Former Qin and Later Qin minister

- 權翼

Assistant Gentleman Attendant of the Yellow Gate (給事黃門侍郎)
- In office 357 – ?
- Monarch: Fu Jian

Secretary of the Personnel (吏部尚書)
- In office ? – 370
- Monarch: Fu Jian

Deputy Director of the Right of the Masters of Writing (尚書右僕射)
- In office 370 – ?
- Monarch: Fu Jian

Colonel-Director of Retainers (司隸校尉)
- In office ? – 385
- Monarch: Fu Jian

Minister of Ceremonies (太常)
- In office ?–?
- Monarch: Yao Chang

Personal details
- Born: Unknown Lueyang County, Hanzhong, Shaanxi
- Died: Unknown
- Relations: Quan Deyu (descendant)
- Courtesy name: Ziliang (子良)

Quan Yi (fl. 4th century), courtesy name Ziliang, was a minister of Former Qin and Later Qin during the Sixteen Kingdoms period. Quan Yi was one of the followers of the Qiang general, Yao Xiang, who surrendered from Later Zhao to the Jin dynasty. After Yao Xiang was killed in 357, Quan Yi followed Xiang's brother, Yao Chang and surrendered to Former Qin, where he served for 28 years. Following the disastrous Battle of Fei River in 383, Quan Yi attempted to stop Murong Chui from marching to north, but was outmaneuvered. As Western Yan troops encircled the capital Chang'an, Quan Yi fled to Yao Chang, now ruler of Later Qin, who he served until his death.

Quan Yi was also supposedly the ancestor of the Tang dynasty chancellor, Quan Deyu.

== Service under Yao Xiang ==
In 352, the ruling Shi family of Later Zhao was destroyed by Ran Min. The Zhao general, Yao Yizhong, gave orders to his sons to flee south and serve the Jin dynasty as he grew deathly ill. After his death, his son Yao Xiang succeeded him and went south. Yao Xiang's party stopped along the way at Que'ao Crossing (碻磝, in present-day Chiping District, Shandong) for Yao Xiang to hand out appointments to his followers. Quan Yi, a native of Lueyang County, was given the responsibility of being Yao Xiang's Army Advisor together with Xue Zan (薛贊). Although the group was intercepted by Former Qin forces along the way, Yao Xiang managed to reach Jin territory and submit to the court. The court made Yao Xiang a general and assigned him to Qiao (譙; present-day Bozhou, Anhui).

=== Service under the Jin dynasty ===
However, Yao Xiang did not get along with Jin's leading commander, Yin Hao. In 353, Yin Hao was concern with Yao Xiang's autonomy and wanted to kill him. In his second assassination attempt, Yin Hao's general Wei Jing (魏憬) led an ill-fated ambush against Yao Xiang and was killed. After his death, Wei Jing's family continuously visited Yao Xiang and Yin Hao's base in Shouchun, causing much worry for Yao Xiang. Yao Xiang sent Quan Yi to talk to Yin Hao regarding the recent turn of events.

During their meeting, Yin Hao said to Quan Yi, "General Yao and I are both servants of His Highness. We share both joys and sorrows. However, General Yao is often arbitrary, which is not what I am hoping for from him." Quan Yi replied, "Yao Xiang is an unmatched hero with tens of thousands under his wing. The reason he obeys the House of Jin is that he had heard of the court's virtue and its many wise ministers. Yet you, General, easily believe in slanders and estrange yourself from General Yao. I believe the root of suspicion lies in you." Yin Hao said, "General Yao is unruly in nature, sparing and punishing as he pleases. Furthermore, he had allowed one of his underling to steal my horse. Is this how a servant of the throne acts?" Quan Yi said, "General Yao serves the imperial dynasty, how could he possibly harm the innocent? But the treacherous have no place under the law, so what pity is there in killing them?" Yin Hao continued, "Then why steal my horse?" Quan Yi responded, “General, you had said that the General Yao is a powerful man, too difficult to control, and that you plan to subdue him one day. That was why he took your horse, in order to defend himself." Yin Hao laughed and said, "Now how could that be?"

Shortly after the talk, another northern expedition was held, but during the expedition, Yao Xiang rebelled and ambushed Yin Hao's army. Quan Yi followed Yao Xiang throughout his time roving the Central Plains until Xiang was killed by Former Qin forces in 357. Quan Yi joined Xiang's brother, Yao Chang in surrendering to Qin and serving their new state.

== Service under Former Qin ==
After he joined the state, Quan Yi found himself favouring Fu Jian, the cousin of the Qin emperor, Fu Sheng. However, Quan Yi and Xue Zan took notice of Fu Sheng's tyrannical behaviours and wanted Fu Jian to replace him. They told him, "Our Lord is distrusting and cruel, those within and beyond are appalled by him. Qin deserves a better ruler, and who else better than Your Highness?" After consulting Lü Polou (呂婆樓), Fu Jian agreed. Fu Jian then recruited the hermit Wang Meng, and, when the time was ripe, led his troops against Fu Sheng to depose him.

After Fu Jian ascended the throne, Quan Yi was appointed Assistant Gentleman of the Yellow Gates. He and Xue Zan worked together with Wang Meng, handling confidential affairs in the government. During a visit to Longmen Five Shrines (龍門五畤) to carry out sacrifices, Fu Jian began to admire the scenery, and told his ministers, "These mountains and rivers are beautiful. Yet, at the same time, they are impenetrable." Quan Yi replied, "Wu Qi once said that there is no danger in virtue, and I sincerely hope that Your Majesty will follow the examples of Yao and Shun in cherishing it. The strength of these mountains and rivers alone are not enough." Fu Jian was pleased by his input.

For the next few years, Quan Yi rose to the position of Supervisor of the Masters of Writing. In 370, he was appointed Deputy Director of the Right of the Masters of Writing.

That same year, Former Qin conquered its rival state, Former Yan. Shortly after Yan's demise, Quan Yi met with the ten-year-old Murong Feng (慕容鳳), son of the Yan general Murong Huan (慕容桓). After the Yan emperor, Murong Wei, surrendered, Huan continued fighting but was killed in the end. Quan Yi advised him, "Child, you display promising talents. Do not follow your father, who chose to be ignorant of his destiny." Murong Feng scolded him, "My late father merely acted out of loyalty. He performed dutifully as every minister should even if he had failed. If the people believed in what you said, then how can we expect the future to follow the way of righteousness?" Quan Yi quickly apologized to him and later informed the incident to Fu Jian. He said, "Murong Feng is a talented fellow, but a wolf-like child has an evil heart. I fear he will be of no use in the end."

=== Intercepting Murong Chui ===
For the next decade, Fu Jian continued his conquest of China, eventually leaving the Jin dynasty as the last remaining state in China to oppose the Qin expansion. Fu Jian wanted to conquer the southlands and complete his unification, but this was met with heavy opposition from some prominent officials including Quan Yi, Fu Rong, Dao'an and Shi Yue in 382. Quan Yi argued that although Jin was weak, the alliance of Huan Chong and Xie An was strong, and their officials were still loyal to their dynasty. Quan Yi also submitted a petition to remonstrate Fu Jian, but his suggestions fell on deaf ears.

Fu Jian's string of success came to an end with a terrible defeat at the Battle of Feishui in 383. Although Fu Jian managed to return to the north, the effects of the battle were beginning to show, as the Murong clan began making their moves to break away from Qin. Murong Chui was persuaded by his son, Murong Nong to revive their fallen state of Yan in Liaodong. Chui agreed, and at Mianchi, he tricked Fu Jian into letting him move to the northern borders, supposedly to secure the area from revolts. Quan Yi saw through his ruse, and quickly told Fu Jian to recall him back to the capital. However, Fu Jian was confident in Murong Chui's loyalty and refused to do so.

Despite Fu Jian's rejection, Quan Yi was determined to stop Murong Chui from reaching the north. Quan Yi, without Fu Jian's knowledge, sent warriors to intercept Murong Chui at the bridge across the Yellow River south of Kongcang (空倉). Murong Chui suspected something was off, so instead of taking the bridge, he created rafts in order for he and his men to cross the river. Meanwhile, he had one of his officers, Cheng Tong (程同) to wear his clothes and ride his horse while leading his boy attendants to use the bridge. Quan Yi's men ambushed Cheng Tong, but he managed to escape, and so did Murong Chui.

=== Fall of Chang'an ===
In 384, Former Qin began to fall apart. Murong Chui broke away and formed Later Yan, while his nephew Murong Hong created Western Yan. Yao Chang would also later declare independence and form Later Qin that year. Fu Jian regretted not following Quan Yi's advice and asked him what their next move should be. Quan Yi told him, "The enemies would not last for long. Murong Chui is preoccupied in securing the east of the mountains, and will not pose a threat. Our primary concern should be within the capital region, where the Xianbei clans densely reside. You should deal with this immediately." Fu Jian agreed and handed out new appointments to his loyalists.

In 385, Western Yan forces were close to conquer Qin's capital of Chang'an. Fu Jian had fled the city, promising to return with an army to save it. However, Fu Jian never returned, as he was captured by Later Qin forces and later executed. Meanwhile, Western Yan forces eventually overwhelmed the defenses, prompting Fu Jian's son, Fu Hong (苻宏) to abandon the capital. Quan Yi also fled the city with many others including Xue Zan, Huangfu Fu (皇甫覆), Zhao Qian (趙遷) and Duan Keng (段鏗) over to Later Qin.

== Service under Later Qin ==
Quan Yi was once a subordinate of Yao Chang and his brother, which was why he decided to go over to his state. Yao Chang accepted Quan Yi's surrender and even allowed him to serve in his government. His only known position during his stint in Later Qin was the Minister of Ceremonies. He remained with the state for the rest of his life, but it is not exactly known when he died.

Yao Chang was straightforward and harsh with his criticism, not afraid to insult and humiliate anyone he saw wrong in front of everybody. One day, Quan Yi admonished him to tone down his character. He said to the emperor, "Your Majesty holds a self-ordained position. You should not entertain this sort of triviality. To attract the heroes, he cast his net to the talented, and appreciated the good while forgiving the bad. These were the qualities of Han Gaozu. It is not too late to change your ways." However, Yao Chang replied, "This is simply my nature. Not a single part of me resembles Emperor Shun, and I have quite a few of Han Gaozu's flaw. But if the people do not hear my words, how else would they know of their wrongdoings?"
