= Fu Xiong =

Former Qin general and prime minister

- 苻雄

Prime Minister (丞相)
- In office 351 – 354
- Monarch: Fu Jiàn

Personal details
- Born: Unknown
- Died: 26 July 354
- Spouse: Empress Dowager Gou
- Relations: Fu Jiàn (苻健) (brother); Fu Ding (brother); Fu Jiàn (苻鑒) (brother)
- Children: Fu Fa; Fu Jiān; Fu Rong; Fu Shuang; Fu Zhong
- Parents: Fu Hong (father); Lady Jiang (mother)
- Courtesy name: Yuancai (元才)
- Posthumous name: Prince Jingwu (敬武王); Prince Wei (魏王); Emperor Wenhuan (文桓皇帝)

Fu Xiong, courtesy name Yuancai, originally named Pu Xiong (蒲雄), was a Di military general of Former Zhao and Former Qin during the Sixteen Kingdoms period. He was the father of Fu Jiān, the third ruler of Former Qin. During the confusion following Shi Hu's death, he served as a general under his father Pu Hong, and during the reign of his brother Fu Jiàn (note the different pinyin), he was given the role of Prime Minister. Fu Xiong's biggest contribution to the state was when he repelled a major invasion from the Grand Marshal of Jin, Huan Wen, at the Battle of Bailu Plain in 354. After Fu Jiān killed Fu Sheng and took the throne in 357, he was posthumously honoured as Emperor Wenhuan.

== Service under Pu/Fu Hong ==
Pu Xiong was the second child to the Di chieftain and Later Zhao general, Pu Hong. From a young age, he had a liking for military scriptures and was also good at riding and shooting. However, he was also described as ugly, having short feet and a big head, earning him the nickname "Big-headed Prancing Dragon General". He would often use his political skills to give positions in the Zhao government to commoners he saw fit. Soon, he participated in enough of his father's campaign to earn him to the position of Prancing Dragon General from Shi Hu.

Later Zhao collapsed into civil war after the death of Shi Hu in 349. Pu Hong always had imperial ambitions and wanted to use the chaos to form his own state, so he refused to submit to Zhao's de facto ruler Ran Min. Pu Xiong intercepted a general of Ran Min named Ma Qiu who was on the way to Yecheng in 350. Ma Qiu was trusted by Pu Hong and was appointed a general. Later that year, Pu Hong declared himself Prince of the Three Qin and changed the family name to Fu. However, he would not live for long after, as he was poisoned by Ma Qiu at a banquet the same year.

== Service under Fu Jiàn ==
Fu Xiong's elder brother, Fu Jiàn killed Ma Qiu and assumed the throne in 350. Fu Xiong was made his General Who Upholds The State and followed him during his campaign against Du Hong (杜洪) in Guanzhong. During the campaign, Fu Xiong defeated Du Hong's general Zhang Guang (張光). Fu Jiàn then sent Xiong to conquer the territories north of the Wei River. After Fu Jiàn occupied Chang'an, Fu Xiong destroyed the last resistance in Shanggui led by Zhao's Inspector of Liangzhou, Shi Ning (石寧).

The following year, in 351, Fu Jiàn declared himself Heavenly King. Among the various titles he handed out to his subordinates and family members, Fu Xiong in particular received the important titles of Prime Minister and Commander of all military affairs. In 352, Fu Xiong and many others recommended Fu Jiàn to further declare himself emperor. Fu Jiàn agreed and declared a general amnesty.

Later in 352, the Jin generals, Xie Shang and Yao Xiang, attacked the independent warlord Zhang Yu (張遇) at Xuchang. Fu Xiong and his nephew Fu Jing marched to Xuchang to prevent the city from falling to Jin. Fu Xiong routed Xie Shang at Chengqiao (誠橋; near Xuchang), causing him to retreat to Huainan. Yao Xiang also decided to withdraw to help Xie Shang. Fu Xiong then relocated Zhang Yu and thousands of households living under him back to the capital and placed Xuchang under Qin control.

Near the end of the year, Fu Xiong campaigned against the Qinzhou (秦州, modern eastern Gansu) warlord Wang Zhuo at Longxi, forcing him to flee to Former Liang. In 353, Wang Zhuo struck back with reinforcements from Zhang Chonghua's generals. Fu Xiong defended with Fu Jing at Longli (龍黎, in present-day Wushan County, Gansu), where they greatly routed him, killing thousands and capturing the Liang generals Zhang Hong (張弘) and Song Xiu (宋修). In the middle of the year, Fu Xiong attacked Chouchi, defeating its Duke, Yang Chu. Due to an attempted insurrection in the capital made by Zhang Yu which triggered other minor revolts, Fu Xiong was recalled back to Chang'an to defeat the rebels. Fu Xiong put down the revolt of Kong Te (孔持) and in 354 the revolt of Zhou Cheng (周成).

=== Huan Wen's 1st Northern Expedition ===
Fu Xiong faced his biggest threat yet in 354 as he faced a major invasion from Jin. The Grand Marshal, Huan Wen, invaded Qin through Jingzhou while Sima Xun attack Qin's western borders through Liangzhou with assistance from Wang Zhuo. Fu Jiàn sent Fu Xiong, Fu Chang, Fu Jing, Fu Sheng and Fu Shuo (苻碩) to repel the invasion. Fu Xiong was badly defeated at Lantian despite the heroics of his nephew Fu Sheng. He was also defeated at Bailu Plains (白鹿原, west of Lantian County, Shaanxi) by Huan Wen's younger brother Huan Chong. As Huan Wen revelled in his victory and comforted the people around Chang'an, Fu Xiong shifted his attack over to Sima Xun, defeating him at Ziwu Valley (子午峪, in present-day Xi'an, Shaanxi).

Fu Xiong fought Huan Wen at Bailu Plains again, this time getting the best of him. Huan Wen's army suffered from a shortage of food, as he initially expected there to be plenty around Chang'an. The opposite turned out true, as the Qin people had already harvested their crops prior to his coming. The fighting left more than ten thousand dead, so Huan Wen retreated from Guanzhong while bringing along thousands of those living in Qin lands. With Huan Wen dealt with, Fu Xiong drove out Sima Xun and Wang Zhuo out of Chenchang.

=== Death and posthumous honours ===
Fu Xiong led his final campaign against Qiao Bing (喬秉) in Yongzhou. He died during the campaign from natural cause on July 26. Fu Jiàn grew distressed from his death, lamenting, "Does Heaven not want me to conquer the Four Seas? Why else would they take my Yuancai!" He posthumously named Fu Xiong Prince Jingwu and Prince of Wei. Fu Xiong was succeeded by his son Fu Jiān. In 357, Fu Jiān killed his tyrannical cousin and emperor Fu Sheng and took the throne. He posthumously honoured his father as Emperor Wenhuan after his ascension.
