= Gou =

Gou or GOU may refer to:

== People ==
- Empress Gou (fl. 359), wife of Fú Jiān of Former Qin
- Empress Dowager Gou (fl. 337–371), mother of Fú Jiān of Former Qin
- Oeyo (1573–1626), wife of Shōgun Tokugawa Hidetada

=== Surname ===
- Khadafi Gou (born 1977), Cuban footballer
- Terry Gou (born 1950), Taiwanese businessman
- Xiao Gou (died 887), Chinese chancellor

== Other uses ==
- Gō (TV series), a Japanese drama
- Gō (given name), a masculine Japanese given name
- Gō (unit), a traditional Japanese unit of volume
- Garoua International Airport, in Cameroon
- Gawar language
- General Offensive Unit, a class of fictional artificially intelligent starship in The Culture universe of late Scottish author Iain Banks
- Godfrey Okoye University, in Enugu, Nigeria
- Government of Uganda (GOU)
- United Officers' Group (Spanish: Grupo de Oficiales Unidos), a defunct Argentine nationalist secret society
- Main Operations Directorate (Glavnoe upravlenie operatsii) of the General Staff of the Armed Forces of the Russian Federation
