= Wang Meng (Former Qin) =

Chinese general and politician

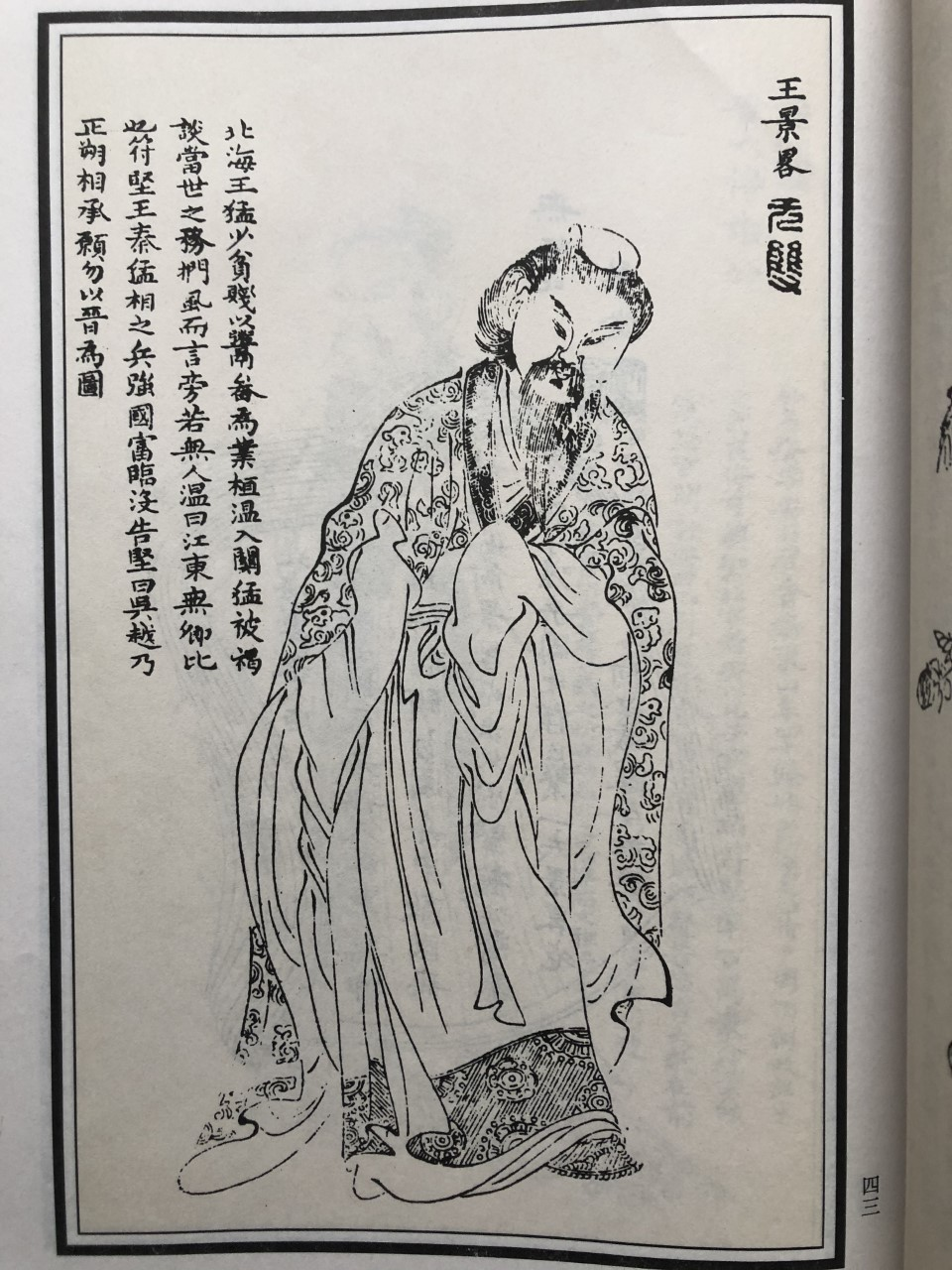
Wang Meng as depicted in the Wu Shuang Pu (無雙譜, Table of Peerless Heroes) by Jin Guliang

Wang Meng (Chinese: 王猛; pinyin: Wáng Měng; 325 – August or September 375), courtesy name Jinglüe (景略), formally Marquess Wu of Qinghe (清河武侯), was a Chinese military general and politician. He served as a chancellor of the Former Qin dynasty of China and under the Emperor Xuanzhao in the fourth century AD. Under his governance, the Former Qin expanded from encompassing only most of Shaanxi, eastern Gansu, and extreme western Shanxi and Henan, to covering nearly all of then-Chinese territory north of the Huai River and the southwest. He is commonly regarded as one of the greatest statesmen in Chinese history. Wang Meng is depicted in the Wu Shuang Pu (無雙譜, Table of Peerless Heroes) by Jin Guliang.

== Early life ==
Wang Meng was poor in his youth when he lived in the Later Zhao capital Yecheng, and he made a living by making bamboo grain containers for threshing. Despite his intelligence, his talents were not discovered by Later Zhao officials. The intelligentsia also largely refused to associate with him, since he was unkempt in his appearance. He later became a hermit at Huayin Mountain, in the territory of Former Qin, ruled by the Fu clan of Di ethnicity, after Later Zhao's collapse.

When the Jin general Huan Wen made a major attack on Former Qin in 354 and reached all the way to Ba River (灞水), in the vicinity of Former Qin's capital Chang'an, Wang went to meet Huan. Wang, as unkempt as he was, was using his hand to slap at fleas and ticks during the conversation, but impressed Huan with his knowledge and tactics. Huan then asked him why the people of the Qin lands were not shifting their allegiance to Jin, and Wang pointed out that the people were not sure what Huan's intentions were, given that he hesitated at crossing the Ba River. As the situation stalemated, Huan began to run out of food supplies and was forced to withdraw. He invited Wang to withdraw with him, but Wang declined, apparently believing that Huan was not the right person to follow.

After Fu Sheng, the son of Former Qin founding emperor Fu Jiàn, became emperor in 355, he ruled the empire with stern cruelty and arbitrariness, slaughtering officials and nobles at will. His cousin Fu Jiān (note different tone) the Prince of Donghai feared that he would be the next target, and secretly plotted with a number of people. At Lü Polou (呂婆樓)'s suggestion, Fu Jiān met Wang, and they became friends immediately, and Fu Jiān compared their meeting to Liu Bei's meeting of Zhuge Liang.

In 357, after finding out that Fu Sheng was ready to kill him and his brother Fu Fa (苻法) the Prince of Qinghe, Fu Jiān acted preemptively, overthrowing and killing Fu Sheng. He assumed the throne under the title "Heavenly Prince" (Tian Wang), and he made Wang one of his key advisors, along with his brothers Fu Fa and Fu Rong, his son Fu Pi, and his mother Empress Dowager Gou's lover Li Wei (李威).

== Early career ==
Under Li's suggestion, however, Fu Jiān increasingly entrusted greater and greater responsibility to Wang, and Wang handled the responsibility capably. When he got into a conflict of words with the general Fan Shi (樊世), angering Fan so much that Fan physically attacked him, Fu put Fan to death. Wang was named the mayor of Chang'an in 359, and quickly arrested and executed the founding emperor Fu Jiàn's brother-in-law Qiang De (強德), who had previously robbed the people of possessions and children unpunished. Quickly, the noble families curbed their behavior, and social order was well established, in Chang'an. Late that year, Fu Jiān promoted him to prime minister, despite his initial refusal and recommendation of Fu Rong for that post.

Wang Meng, as prime minister, organized the Former Qin government into a model of efficiency and honesty—sometimes to the degree of ruthlessness. In 364, for example, after Fu Sheng's brother Fu Teng (苻騰) the Duke of Ru'nan rebelled and was executed, Wang suggested to Fu Jiān that Fu Sheng's four remaining brothers be killed as well, a suggestion that Fu Jiān rejected. Wang also showed military talent, in addition to talent in governance. In 366, for example, Fu Jiān sent him, Yang An, and Yao Chang to make a successful raid against Jin's Jing Province (荊州, modern central and southern Hubei). In 367, Wang also led an army against the warlords Lian Qi (斂岐) and Li Yan (李儼), who occupied modern eastern Gansu and who had vacillated between Former Qin and Former Liang. At that time, however, Wang avoided a direct confrontation with Former Liang's ruler Zhang Tianxi, as he negotiated a compromise in dividing Li's territory and followers.

In late 367, Fu Sheng's remaining brothers—Fu Liu (苻柳) the Duke of Jin, Fu Sou (苻廋) the Duke of Wei, and Fu Wu (苻武) the Duke of Yan, along with Fu Jiān's brother Fu Shuang (苻雙) the Duke of Zhao, rebelled. Fu Jiān sent separate forces against each of the rebellious dukes, and Wang was sent to attack Fu Liu, whom he defeated easily. Wang then turned his attention against Fu Sou, and eventually, all four dukes were defeated and killed.

In 369, when Huan Wen launched a major attack against Former Yan, the Former Yan emperor Murong Wei and regent Murong Ping panicked and sought assistance from Former Qin, promising to cede the Luoyang region to Former Qin if it rendered assistance. Most Former Qin officials suggested a refusal, but Wang reminded Fu Jiān that if Huan conquered Former Yan and added its territory to Jin's, Former Qin would not be able to stand. Fu Jiān therefore sent a force commanded by Shi Yue (石越) to relieve Former Yan, whose general Murong Chui defeated Huan, with Shi's assistance. However, Former Yan refused to cede Luoyang, and Fu Jiān commissioned Wang to lead a 60,000-men force against Former Yan later that year. Wang's campaign seemed even more promising after Murong Chui, fearful of Murong Ping's jealousy and the emperor Murong Wei's mother Empress Dowager Kezuhun's hatred toward him, defected to Former Qin. Fu Jiān greeted Murong Chui with great honors, but Wang distrusted Murong Chui.

In early 370, Wang attacked Luoyang, forcing its surrender. He then carried out a plot to try to put Murong Chui to death—as he bribed one of Murong Chui's guards Jin Xi (金熙) into giving Murong Chui's heir apparent Murong Ling (慕容令), who was serving as Wang's guide, a false message that Murong Chui had heard that Empress Dowager Kezuhun had regretted her actions and that, therefore, he was defecting back to Former Yan. Murong Ling, unable to verify either the truth or the falsehood of the message, decided to defect back to Former Yan. Wang immediately accused Murong Ling of treason, and Murong Chui, in fear, fled, but was captured, although Fu Jiān believed that Murong Ling was acting independently and therefore pardoned Murong Chui. (Historians such as Sima Guang, the author of Zizhi Tongjian, and Bo Yang, have criticized Wang as driven by jealousy of how honored Murong Chui was by Fu Jiān, although this point is disputed by other historians.)

Wang continued his campaign against Former Yan, and he advanced on Hu Pass (壺關, in modern Changzhi, Shanxi), defeating all Former Yan resistance on the way. He then captured Jinyang (晉陽, in modern Taiyuan, Shanxi). Murong Ping led a 300,000-men strong force against Wang, but apprehensive of Wang, he stopped at Lu River (潞川, in modern Changzhi as well). Wang soon arrived to prepare to face off against him. Meanwhile, Murong Ping made the worst display of his corruption at this time—keeping guards at forests and streams, disallowing commoners and even his own soldiers from cutting firewood or fishing unless they paid a usage fee in either money or silk. He soon had a stash of wealth, but completely lost the morale of his soldiers. Murong Wei, hearing this, sent a messenger to rebuke him and ordering him to distribute the wealth to the soldiers, but the damage was done. In winter 370, the armies engaged, and despite the numerical advantage that Murong Ping had, Wang crushed him, and Murong Ping fled back to the Former Yan capital Yecheng by himself. Murong Wei abandoned Yecheng and tried to flee to the old capital Helong (和龍, in modern Jinzhou, Liaoning), but was captured on the way. Fu Jiān pardoned him but had him formally surrender with his officials, ending Former Yan.

== Late career ==
Fu Jiān made Wang Meng the viceroy over six provinces—the former territory of Former Yan. In those six provinces, Wang had full imperial authority, an authority that Wang tried to decline repeatedly, but eventually exercised. In 371, he wrote to Zhang Tianxi and persuaded him to submit to Former Qin authority as a vassal. Later that year, he again tried to decline the responsibilities of viceroy over six provinces, and offered to govern just one province. Fu Jiān refused.

In 372, Fu Jiān summoned Wang back to Chang'an to again be prime minister. Fu Rong succeeded him as viceroy over the six provinces. It was described that during this time, Wang was so capable that Fu Jiān barely had to carry out any duties of his own. Sima Guang had this description of Wang's abilities:

Wang was strong in personality and understanding, honest and resolute, clean and solemn, and he understood right and wrong very well. He deposed incompetent officials and promoted the talented people who were hidden in the lower ranks due to their lack of connections. He supervised the people to tend their fields, plant mulberries, and keep silkworms, in addition to strengthening the battle training of the troops. Each official was competent in tasks that he was given. Each penalty fit the evidence of the crime. Therefore, the empire became rich and powerful and undefeatable. It was during this time that Former Qin was a most well-run state.

In summer 375, Wang grew ill. In order to try to appease the spirits to save Wang's life, Fu Jiān ordered a general pardon. However, by autumn, Wang was near death. On his deathbed, he warned Fu Jiān against campaigns to conquer Eastern Jin, and stated that he believed that the Xianbei (the people of Former Yan's nobility) and the Qiang would create trouble in the future and should be watched against. He then died. However, Fu Jiãn failed to take in this last advice, and launched a major offensive against Eastern Jin in the autumn of 383, but was badly defeated at the Battle of Fei River in winter that year, severely weakening Former Qin and eventually led to its collapse in 394.

Wang Meng's sons Wang Yong (王永) and Wang Pi (王皮) would serve as Former Qin officials, and Wang Yong would eventually be prime minister during the reign of Fu Pi, but was unable to reverse Former Qin's collapse at that time. One of Wang Meng's grandsons, Wang Zhen'e, would later be a Jin general under Liu Yu.
