= Fu Jian (337–385) =

Emperor Xuanzhao of Former Qin 前秦宣昭帝
- Heavenly King of Great Qin
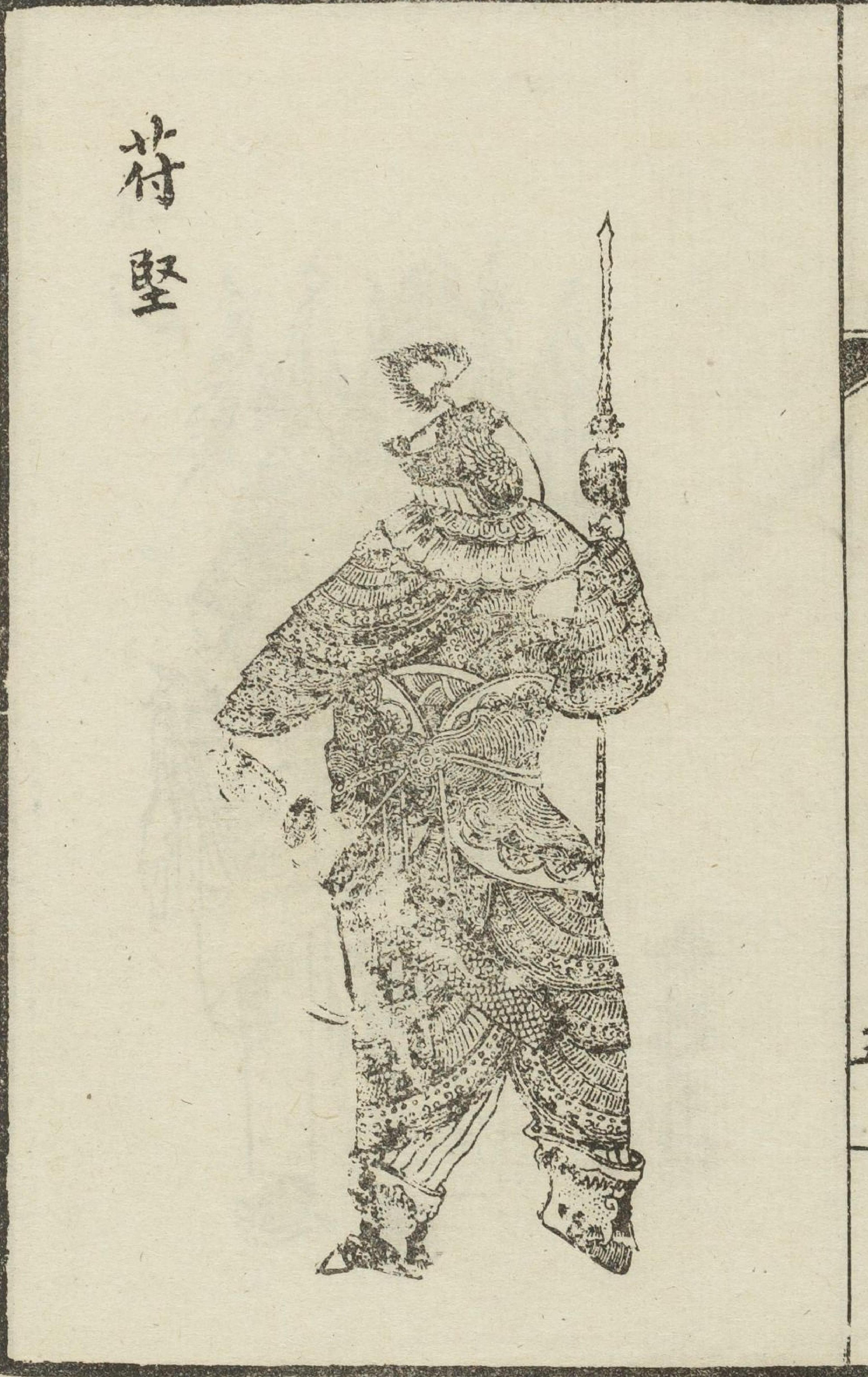

Ruler of Former Qin
- Reign: 357–385
- Predecessor: Fu Sheng
- Successor: Fu Pi

Prince of Donghai
- Reign: 354–357
- Born: Pú Jiān (蒲堅); 337
- Died: October 16, 385 (aged 47–48)
- Spouse: Empress Gou; Princess Qinghe of Former Yan
- Issue: Fu Pi, 6 other sons and 4 daughters
Names
- Fú Jiān (苻堅)
Era dates
- Yǒngxīng (永興): 357–359; Gānlù (甘露): 359–364; Jiànyuán (建元): 365–385
Regnal name
- Heavenly King of Great Qin (大秦天王)
Posthumous name
- Emperor Xuānzhāo (宣昭皇帝, lit. "responsible and accomplished") (by Former Qin); Heavenly King Zhuanglie (壯烈天王) (by Later Qin); Emperor Wenzhao (文昭皇帝) (by Later Liang)
Temple name
- Shìzǔ (世祖)
- House: Fu (Pu)
- Dynasty: Former Qin
- Father: Fu Xiong
- Mother: Princess Consort Gou

Fu Jian (Chinese: 苻堅; 337 – 16 October 385), courtesy name Yonggu (永固) or Wenyu (文玉), also known by his posthumous name as the Emperor Xuanzhao of Former Qin (前秦宣昭帝), was the third monarch of the Di-led Chinese Former Qin dynasty, ruling as Heavenly King. Under his reign, the Former Qin unified Northern China by conquering the Former Yan, Chouchi, Former Liang, and Dai, as well as the Eastern Jin's Yi Province (modern Sichuan and Chongqing), until he was repelled at the Battle of Fei River in 383. Following this defeat, the Former Qin state disintegrated and Fu was assassinated in 385 by Yao Chang, his former subordinate who then founded the Later Qin dynasty. He was considered by traditional histories to be a virtuous and just ruler, who, ironically, by sparing too many of his enemies after defeating them, led to his own downfall.

== Early life ==
Fu Jian was born in 337, when the family name was still Pu (蒲), to Fu Xiong (苻雄) and his wife Lady Gou. His grandfather Pu Hong (蒲洪) was a Di chieftain and a major general for Later Zhao, serving under the violent emperor Shi Hu, who did however accord Pu great respect. Later, during Later Zhao's collapse, Pu Hong changed his name to Fu Hong, and planned a conquest of the Guanzhong region, but was poisoned by the general Ma Qiu. He was succeeded by his son, Fu Jian's uncle Fu Jian (317–355) (苻健), who advanced west to conquer the Guanzhong region and the surrounding provinces, and established Former Qin in 351. In this, he was ably assisted by Fu Jian's father Fu Xiong, whom he created the Prince of Donghai. In 354, while on a campaign, Fu Xiong died. As the son of Fu Xiong's wife, Fu Jian inherited the title of Prince of Donghai, even though he had at least one older brother, Fu Fa (苻法), who was created the Prince of Qinghe. Fu Jian developed the reputation of being filial and far-sighted, as well as being knowledgeable and able.

As Fu Jian grew older, he received some military responsibilities under his cousin Fu Sheng, who succeeded Former Qin's founding emperor after his death in 355. In 357, when Yao Xiang (姚襄), a major Qiang chief, attacked Former Qin, hoping to conquer it, Fu Jian was one of the generals who fought him and defeated him, capturing and executing him on the battlefield. Yao Xiang's brother Yao Chang surrendered. Initially, the lead general Fu Huangmei (苻黃眉) the Prince of Guangping wanted to put Yao Chang to death, but Fu Jian interceded, and Yao Chang was spared.

Fu Sheng's reign was one filled with violence, caprice, and cruelty. As he killed official after official in his administration, all of the nobles and officials became fearful of being the next target. A number of officials tried to persuade Fu Jian to overthrow Fu Sheng, and it was in the planning stages that Fu Jian, under the introduction of the official Lü Polou (呂婆樓), met Wang Meng, with whom he immediately developed a friendship. Fu Jian planned to act against Fu Sheng but hesitated, since Fu Sheng was a powerful warrior. However, after news leaked that Fu Sheng had planned to kill Fu Jian and his brother Fu Fa, Fu Jian and Fu Fa took immediate action and attacked the palace while Fu Sheng was in a drunken stupor. Fu Sheng's guards surrendered without a fight, and Fu Jian put Fu Sheng to death and took over the throne. He did not, however, take imperial title as Fu Sheng had, but claimed the title "Heavenly King" (Tian Wang). He posthumously honored his father Fu Xiong as an emperor, and he honored his mother Lady Gou as an empress dowager. His wife Lady Gou was created empress.

== Reign with the assistance of Wang Meng ==
At the start of Fu Jian's reign, in addition to Wang Meng, he had several other top advisors—his brothers Fu Fa and Fu Rong the Duke of Yangping, his son Fu Pi the Duke of Changle, and his mother Empress Dowager Gou's lover Li Wei (李威). It was with Li's support that Wang's position became increasingly important, eventually becoming one of prime minister status. This was particularly the case when, around new year 358, Empress Dowager Gou, apprehensive of Fu Fa's growing authority, forced him to commit suicide. Senior officials, mostly of Di ethnicity, were often jealous of Wang, but whatever conflict they engaged with Wang always resulted in Wang's prevailing over them, since Wang was favored by Fu Jian. Wang, with Fu Jian's support, established rule of law throughout the empire, and he even executed the founding emperor's honored but corrupt brother-in-law, Qiang De (強德), despite Fu Jian's desire to pardon Qiang. It was described that the empire was ruled efficiently and justly during this period. Fu Jian was also recorded as having the cruel laws of Fu Sheng's reign and the extravagance. He also encouraged his officials to recommend talented people for posts, and rewarded or punished them based on whether the people they recommended performed their jobs well. It was described that Former Qin officials were therefore all highly competent and responsible.

In 364, Fu Jian conferred titles on Zhang Tianxi, the nominal Jin vassal who was the ruler of Former Liang, making him a Former Qin vassal as well. In late 365, however, Zhang Tianxi disavowed that status and cut off relations with Former Qin.

Later in 364, Fu Sheng's brother Fu Teng the Duke of Ru'nan rebelled, but was captured and executed. Wang, concerned about four other brothers of Fu Sheng (Fu You (苻幼) the Duke of Huai'nan, Fu Liu (苻柳) the Duke of Jin, Fu Sou (苻廋) the Duke of Wei, and Fu Wu (苻武) the Duke of Yan), suggested to Fu Jian to have all of them killed. Fu Jian refused.

Late in 364, Fu Jian tried to restore the early Jin system by permitting the dukes—his brothers, sons, and cousins—to commission their own assistants. However, he cancelled the plans when some of the dukes retained rich merchants to serve as their assistants purely on account of their wealth.

In 365, after the Former Yan regent Murong Ke captured the important Jin city of Luoyang, he postured as if about to attack Former Qin. Fu Jian personally readied his troops to face Murong Ke, but no attack from Murong Ke actually occurred.

Late in 365, Xiongnu chiefs Liu Weichen and Cao Gu rebelled together, and Fu Jian personally attacked them, capturing Liu and forcing Cao's surrender—but, in the first instance of such actions that would lead to disaster decades later, allowed Cao and Liu to continue to command their troops. Later that year, Fu You rebelled but was killed in battle by Li, who had stayed at the capital Chang'an with Fu Jian's crown prince Fu Hong (苻宏, note different character than Fu Jian's grandfather).

In 367, after Murong Ke's death and replacement by the far less capable Murong Ping, Fu Jian began plans to conquer Former Yan. He would soon, however, have to contend with the possibility that his empire would be the one so conquered, as in winter of that year, Fu Liu (at Puban (蒲阪, in modern Yuncheng, Shanxi)), Fu Sou (at Shancheng (陝城), in modern Sanmenxia, Henan)), Fu Wu (at Anding (安定, in modern Pingliang, Gansu)), and Fu Jian's brother Fu Shuang (苻雙) the Duke of Zhao (at Shanggui (上邽, in modern Tianshui, Gansu)), rebelled together, offering to submit to Former Yan and seeking Former Yan aid. However, Murong Ping refused assistance. Fu Jian sent forces to attack the four rebellious dukes separately. Fu Wu and Fu Shuang were quickly defeated and killed, followed by Fu Liu and Fu Sou.

In 369, the paramount Jin general Huan Wen launched a major attack against Former Yan, reaching Fangtou (枋頭, in modern Hebi, Henan), in the vicinity of Former Yan's capital Yecheng. In panic, Former Yan sought assistance from Former Qin, promising that if Former Qin launched troops to assist, it would cede the Luoyang region to Former Qin. Most Former Qin officials opposed, but Wang advised Fu Jian that he had to make sure that Huan would not conquer Former Yan—because Former Qin would not be able to stand up to Jin if Jin destroyed Former Yan. Fu Jian thus launched troops, which arrived after Former Yan's general Murong Chui had already dealt Huan one defeat, but the Former Qin forces, in conjunction with Former Yan, did deal Huan another major defeat. However, Former Yan reneged on its promise to cede the Luoyang region, and Fu Jian put Wang in charge of a 60,000-men force against Former Yan. Wang's campaign seemed even more promising after Murong Chui, fearful of Murong Ping's jealousy and the emperor Murong Wei's mother Empress Dowager Kezuhun's hatred toward him, defected to Former Qin.

In spring 370, Wang first advanced on Luoyang and forced its surrender. He then advanced on Hu Pass (壺關, in modern Changzhi, Shanxi), defeating all Former Yan resistance on the way. He then captured Jinyang (晉陽, in modern Taiyuan, Shanxi). Murong Ping led a 300,000-men strong force against Wang, but apprehensive of Wang, he stopped at Lu River (潞川, in modern Changzhi as well). Wang soon arrived to prepare to face off against him. Meanwhile, Murong Ping made the worst display of his corruption at this time—keeping guards at forests and streams, disallowing commoners and even his own soldiers from cutting firewood or fishing unless they paid a usage fee in either money or silk. He soon had a stash of wealth, but completely lost the morale of his soldiers. Murong Wei, hearing this, sent a messenger to rebuke him and ordering him to distribute the wealth to the soldiers, but the damage was done. In winter 370, the armies engaged, and despite the numerical advantage that Murong Ping had, Wang crushed him, and Murong Ping fled back to Yecheng by himself. Murong Wei abandoned Yecheng and tried to flee to the old capital Helong (和龍, in modern Jinzhou, Liaoning), but was captured on the way. Fu Jian pardoned him but had him formally surrender with his officials, ending Former Yan.

Initially, Fu Jian put Wang Meng in charge of all of the conquered Former Yan territory, as viceroy. He relocated Murong Wei and his clan, as well as a large number of his Xianbei people, to the Guanzhong region, in the heart of Former Qin. In 372, he summoned Wang back to the capital to resume his post as prime minister, while putting Fu Rong in charge of the eastern empire. Wang's authority was described to be so great that Fu Jian himself had little need to worry about the affairs of state.

Fu Jian continued to carry out campaigns that were intended to eventually unite all of China. In 373, he launched a campaign against Jin's western region, conquering modern Sichuan, Chongqing, and southern Shaanxi. Meanwhile, many Former Qin officials, including Wang, became concerned about the large number of Xianbei people that he placed in the heart of the empire and how many Xianbei officials, including those of Former Yan's imperial Murong clan, he put in charge of important posts, and they largely urged him to reduce the authority of Xianbei officials. He refused. In 375, Wang became gravely ill, and he, on his death bed, suggested to Fu Jian to stop the campaigns against Jin while not trusting the Xianbei and Qiang officials as much as he has done. After Wang died, however, Fu Jian did not agree with his last words and continued to bestow authority on the Xianbei and Qiang officials.

== After Wang Meng's death ==
After Wang Meng's death, Fu Jian continued to carry out his campaigns to try to unite the empire. These campaigns, while largely successful, were, according to historical sources, draining on the resources of the empire and of the people, and wore out his troops. Further, Fu Jian, who was known for thrifty living in his early years, began to spend somewhat extravagantly on palace designs. Further, one of Wang's focus areas—to keep the governmental officials honest and competent—appeared to have been ignored, as one began to see false governmental reports in historical records. For example, in 382, Former Qin suffered a major locust infestation that required a failed extermination effort throughout You (幽州, modern Beijing, Tianjin, and northern Hebei), Qing (青州, modern central and eastern Shandong), Ji (冀州, modern central Hebei), and Bing (并州, modern Shanxi) Provinces—and yet the governmental records paradoxically recorded that these provinces, except You Province, received large yields on their crop fields, and that the locusts did not infest the hemp and bean plants, a fairly impossible scenario. This suggested that government officials were no longer reporting statuses of their provinces honestly but were only making reports that pleased Fu Jian and the high level officials. This might be because Fu Jian, after Wang's death, felt that he had to personally oversee everything, and was burdening himself with too many tasks, as evidenced in an edict that he issued in 376 indicating that his workload was burdening him so much that half of his hair turned white.

In fall 376, Fu Jian launched a major attack against Former Liang, after its ruler Zhang Tianxi refused to show submission by visiting the Former Qin capital Chang'an and further killed Fu Jian's messengers. Zhang's generals, who were displeased with the young favorites that he had installed in the regime, either surrendered or were defeated easily, and in less than a month, Zhang was forced to surrender, and Former Liang's territory (modern central and western Gansu, northern Qinghai, and eastern Xinjiang) were annexed to Former Qin. Just two months later, Fu Jian launched another major campaign against Dai and, in light of the recent assassination of its prince Tuoba Shiyijian by his son Tuoba Shijun (拓拔寔君), conquered it as well, although he permitted Tuoba Shiyijian's grandson Tuoba Gui to remain under the care of tribal chief Liu Kuren (劉庫仁) and be the eventual heir presumptive to the Dai throne.

In 378, Fu Jian sent Fu Pi, Murong Wei, and Gou Chang (苟萇) to attack the important Jin border city of Xiangyang (襄陽, in modern Xiangfan, Hubei). At Gou's suggestion, Fu Pi ordered that Xiangyang be surrounded to force it into submission at minimal losses, but Fu Jian, unhappy at his son's slow pace in capturing the city, ordered Fu Pi to either capture the city by spring 379 or commit suicide. Fu Pi therefore launched a major assault on the city, capturing it in spring 379. Weixing (魏興; southeast of present-day Suqian, Jiangsu) also fell. At the same time, however, another army sent by Fu Jian, commanded by Peng Chao (彭超), after capturing Pengcheng (彭城, in modern Xuzhou, Jiangsu), was defeated by the Jin general Xie Xuan and forced to abandon Pengcheng.

In 380, Fu Jian's cousin Fu Luo (苻洛) the Duke of Xingtang, who felt slighted by not being sufficiently rewarded for his victories against Dai in 376 and believed that Fu Jian had worn out his troops, rebelled. He was, however, crushed by the general Lü Guang and captured, but Fu Jian did not kill him but only exiled him. (This was heavily criticized by historians, who believed that Fu Jian, by not executing Fu Luo and several others in similar situations, encouraged future rebellions that eventually brought down his empire.)

Also in 380, Fu Jian carried out a historically controversial decision to distribute his Di people—a small minority in his empire—to various regions of the empire, under the command of his sons and other generals. He probably intended to have them serve as a stabilizing force throughout the empire, but the short-term result was that the heart of the empire, Guanzhong, was left with few Di and filled with Xianbei and Qiang, which would eventually cause a destabilizing effect. He also summoned his brother Fu Rong back to the capital and take over posts previously held by Wang Meng. Fu Pi replaced Fu Rong in his responsibilities as viceroy over the eastern empire.

In late 382, Fu Jian again planned to conquer Jin. Most of the important officials opposed—including the prime minister Fu Rong. However, the campaign was supported by Murong Chui and Yao Chang, and Fu Jian became intent to carrying it out, and when an official raised the point that the Yangtze River was difficult to cross, he made the remarks, "We have so many soldiers that, if they threw down their whips, it would be enough to stop the flow of the Yangtze."

In 383, Fu Jian sent Lü on a campaign to Xiyu (西域, modern Xinjiang and former Soviet central Asia), where some of the kingdoms had submitted to Former Qin as vassals but some had not. Lü's campaign would last several years and be quite successful—but by the time it was complete, Fu Jian would be dead and Former Qin would be near destruction.

== Battle of Fei River ==
In 383, Fu Jian launched the campaign, under Fu Rong's command, despite Fu Rong's opposition. After initial victories, capturing the Jin city of Shouyang (壽陽, in modern Lu'an, Anhui), the Former Qin advance troops would suffer some losses at the hands of Xie Xuan and Liu Laozhi (劉牢之), and the armies would be stalemated at the Fei River (which no longer exists, but likely flowed through modern Lu'an, near the Huai River), with the Former Qin forces to the west of the river and the Jin forces to the east. Xie Xuan suggested to Fu Rong that he retreat west to allow Jin forces to cross, and Fu Jian and Fu Rong agreed, but as the retreat started, the Former Qin forces panicked and could not be stopped. Fu Rong, trying to calm the troops, suddenly had his horse fall under him, and he was killed by Jin forces, which further led to a complete collapse of Former Qin forces. Fu Jian himself was hit by a stray arrow, and was forced to flee to Murong Chui, whose army was one of the few that did not collapse. Murong Chui's son Murong Bao and brother Murong De tried to persuade him to kill Fu Jian and reestablish Yan, but Murong Chui refused, escorting Fu Jian safely back to Luoyang.

== After the Battle of Fei River ==
Murong Chui, while not willing to resort to murder due to Fu Jian's earlier kindness to him, did decide, however, to try to reestablish Yan. Under the pretense of wanting to calm the people of the eastern empire, he persuaded Fu Jian to allow him to lead an army northeast, despite opposition by Quan Yi. As Murong Chui arrived at Yecheng, he and Fu Pi suspected each other but each ruled out suggestions by their respective subordinates to ambush the other. As, at this time, the Dingling chief Zhai Bin (翟斌) rebelled against Former Qin, with assistance with Murong Chui's nephew Murong Feng (慕容鳳), and attacked Luoyang, and Fu Pi sent Murong Chui south to relieve Luoyang, with the Di general Fu Feilong (苻飛龍) as his assistant. On the way to Luoyang, Murong Chui ambushed Fu Feilong and slaughtered his Di soldiers, but still wrote an explanation to Fu Jian. In spring 384, however, Murong Chui would join Zhai and claim the title Prince of Yan, establishing Later Yan. He soon captured many cities in the eastern empire, although Yecheng and Luoyang held out against him.

Meanwhile, Murong Chui's nephew and Murong Wei's brother Murong Hong, upon hearing news of Murong Chui's uprising, gathered some Xianbei soldiers and started his own rebellion within Guanzhong, claiming his old Former Yan title of Prince of Jibei and starting Western Yan. Fu Jian sent his brother Fu Rui (苻叡) the Duke of Julu, assisted by Yao Chang, against Murong Hong. Murong Hong, in fear, was about to leave Guanzhong, and Fu Rui was intent on cutting off his escape route, despite Yao's suggestion to let the Xianbei leave. Instead, Murong Hong, forced into combat, defeated and killed Fu Rui. When Yao sent messengers to the capital to report the defeat, Fu Jian, for reasons unknown, got so angry that he killed Yao's messengers—causing Yao to panic and flee with Qiang soldiers. Yao then declared himself "the Prince of Qin of Ten Thousand Years" (萬年秦王), establishing Later Qin.

Meanwhile, Murong Hong advanced on Chang'an, and he was joined by another brother, Murong Chong. He demanded that Fu Jian escort Murong Wei to him, and Murong Wei, while pledging allegiance to Fu Jian, secretly send messengers to Murong Hong urging him to attack Chang'an, although Murong Hong was then murdered by his own generals and replaced with Murong Chong, who claimed the title of crown prince. Meanwhile, Fu Jian himself led an army against Yao, but was unsuccessful. Fu Jian's son Fu Hui (苻暉) the Duke of Pingyuan then abandoned Luoyang to come to Chang'an's aid, and all of the eastern empire was lost except for Yecheng. Meanwhile, Jin also launched campaigns, and would recapture the modern Chongqing, Sichuan, and southern Shaanxi region by early 385, as well as capturing much of the Former Qin territory south of the Yellow River, although Jin forces under Xie Xuan would at times be in temporary alliance with Fu Pi against Later Yan as well.

In late 384, Murong Wei tried to kill Fu Jian at a feast, and after this was discovered, Fu Jian put him and the other Xianbei inside Chang'an to death. Murong Chong, upon hearing this news, declared himself emperor in early 385. He would continue to deal Fu Hui defeats, and Fu Hui, in anger over the defeats and Fu Jian's rebukes in light of the defeats, committed suicide. With Murong Chong surrounding Chang'an, Chang'an fell into a terrible famine. Fu Jian decided that he would lead an army out of the city to try to capture food supplies, and he left his crown prince Fu Hong in charge of the city, but as soon as he left, the city fell, and Fu Hong fled to Jin.

Meanwhile, Fu Jian himself took his army to Wujiang Mountain (五將山, in modern Baoji, Shaanxi), but was surrounded and captured by Later Qin forces and taken to Xinping (新平, in modern Xianyang, Shaanxi) and imprisoned there with his concubine Consort Zhang, his son Fu Shen (苻詵) the Duke of Zhongshan, and his daughter Fu Bao (苻寶) and Fu Jin (苻錦). Yao Chang tried to persuade him to ceremonially pass the throne to him, but Fu Jian, angry at Yao's betrayal, refused. He also killed Fu Bao and Fu Jin, reasoning that he did not want to let Yao's followers humiliate them. In fall 385, Yao sent his soldiers to strangle Fu Jian. Consort Zhang and Fu Shen committed suicide. Even Later Qin soldiers mourned Fu Jian, however, and Yao, in order to pretend as if he did not put Fu Jian to death, posthumously honored him as Heavenly King Zhuanglie (壯烈天王), although that posthumous name would not be adopted by Fu Pi, who took the imperial throne upon hearing Fu Jian's death.

== Personal information ==
- Father
  - Fu Xiong (苻雄), Prince Jingwu of Donghai and brother of Fu Jian (317–355), posthumously honored as Emperor Wenhuan
- Mother
  - Empress Dowager Gou
- Wife
  - Empress Gou (created 357)
- Major Concubines
  - Consort Zhang
  - Consort Murong, daughter of Murong Jun
- Children
  - Fu Hong (苻宏), the Crown Prince (created 357)
  - Fu Pi (苻丕), the Duke of Changle (created 357), later emperor
  - Fu Hui (苻暉), Duke Dao of Pingyuan (created 357, committed suicide 385)
  - Fu Rui (苻叡), Duke of Julu (killed by Murong Hong of Western Yan 384)
  - Fu Xi (苻熙), the Duke of Guangping (created 357)
  - Fu Lin (苻琳), the Duke of Hejian (killed by Western Yan forces 384)
  - Fu Shen (苻詵), the Duke of Zhongshan (committed suicide 385)
  - Fu Bao (苻寶), Princess (executed 385)
  - Fu Jin (苻錦), Princess (executed 385)
  - Princess Shunyang, wife of Yang Bi (楊璧)
  - A daughter, wife of Yang Ding, later leader of Chouchi

Emperor Xuanzhao of (Former) Qin House of Fu Born: 337 Died: 385
Regnal titles
Preceded by Fu Sheng	Emperor of Former Qin; 357–385	Succeeded by Fu Pi
Titles in pretence
Preceded by Fu Sheng	— TITULAR — Emperor of China; 357–385; Reason for succession failure: Sixteen Kingdoms	Succeeded by Fu Pi
Preceded by Fu Sheng	— TITULAR — Emperor of China; 357–385; Reason for succession failure: Sixteen Kingdoms	Succeeded by Yao Chang
Preceded by Fu Sheng	— TITULAR — Emperor of China; 357–385; Reason for succession failure: Sixteen Kingdoms	Succeeded by Emperor Xiaowu of Jin
Preceded by Zhang Tianxi	— TITULAR — Emperor of China; 357–385; Reason for succession failure: Sixteen Kingdoms	Succeeded by Murong Chong
Preceded by Murong Wei	— TITULAR — Emperor of China; 357–385; Reason for succession failure: Sixteen Kingdoms	Succeeded by Murong Chui
