= Yao Xiang =

Jin dynasty general and Qiang chieftain (died 357)

- 姚襄

Grand Chanyu (大單于) (self-appointed)
- In office 355 – 357
- Monarch: Murong Jun

General Who Pacifies the North (平北將軍)
- In office 352 – 353
- Monarch: Emperor Mu of Jin

General of Agile Cavalry (驃騎將軍)
- In office 351 – 351
- Monarch: Shi Zhi

Personal details
- Born: 331
- Died: 357
- Relations: Yao Yi; Yao Ruo; Yao Chang; Yao Xu; Yao Yinmai; Yao Shuode; Yao Shao; Yao Jing; Yao Huang; 31 unnamed brothers
- Parent: Yao Yizhong (father)
- Courtesy name: Jingguo (景國)
- Posthumous name: Prince Wu of Wei (魏武王)

Yao Xiang (331?–357), courtesy name Jingguo, posthumously honored Prince Wu of Wei, was an ethnic Qiang warlord during the Sixteen Kingdoms and Jin dynasty (266–420) in Chinese history. He was the fifth son and heir of the Later Zhao general Yao Yizhong. After the destruction of Zhao and the death of Yizhong in 352, he went south to serve under the Jin dynasty. However, due to animosity between him and the Jin commander, Yin Hao, he broke away and roved the Central Plains to establish a base while fighting against Jin and the Former Qin. Although he suffered major losses from time to time, his charismatic personality allowed him to win and keep the support of the people wherever he went. In the end, he was killed in an ambush in 357 while fighting Qin forces at Sanyuan. After his death, his brother, Yao Chang, surrendered to Qin and became one of its generals. In 384, he rebelled and established the Later Qin, posthumously honouring Yao Xiang as a prince in the process.

== Service under Later Zhao ==
=== Early life and career ===
The year of Yao Xiang's birth is a matter of dispute. It is recorded that he was 27 years old when he died in 357, meaning that he was born in 331. However, his younger brother, Yao Yizhong's 24th son, Yao Chang, was recorded to be 64 years old when he died in 393, indicating that Yao Chang was born earlier than he was. Thus, there had likely been an error by historians when recording his age.

Yao Xiang was eight chi five cun tall (6 ft 8 In) and even in his youth, he was very popular among the gentry and common people for his talents and hospitality. His first recorded military action was in 350 amidst the aftermath of Ran Min's takeover of the Zhao government. He fought against Yizhong's former colleague, the Di leader Pu Hong, over the strategic location of Guanyou (關右, west of present-day Tongguan County, Shaanxi) but was badly defeated.

=== Ran Wei-Later Zhao War ===
Later that year, Yao Yizhong was appointed the Prime Minister of the Right. As Yizhong looked to establish an heir, many of his subordinates and followers pushed for Yao Xiang. Yizhong declined, as Yao Xiang was not the eldest son. However, support for Yao Xiang continued to grow, so Yizhong eventually accepted their demand. Yao Xiang was later appointed by the Zhao ruler, Shi Zhi, as Commissioner Bearing Credentials.

In 351, Shi Zhi was besieged by Ran Min in Xiangguo. Yao Yizhong sent Yao Xiang to lift the siege, but not before telling his son to swear that he would capture Ran Min for massacring the Shi clan. Yao Xiang arrived in Xiangguo with assistance from Shi Kun (石琨) and Former Yan's general Yue Wan. Yao Xiang defeated Ran Min's general Hu Mu (胡睦) at Zhanglu (長蘆, in present-day Cangzhou, Hebei). As the three forces approached, Ran Min went out to give battle. Yao Xiang, Shi Kun and Yue Wan attacked Ran Min from three sides while Shi Zhi came out to attack from behind. Ran Min suffered a terrible defeat but managed to escape. Though Yao Xiang was victorious, he did not fulfill his promise, so Yizhong punished him with a hundred floggings.

== Flight to the south ==
Shi Zhi died later that same year after his subordinate, Liu Xian, assassinated him and defected to Ran Min. Shi Zhi's death marked the end for Later Zhao, so Yizhong decided to submit to the Jin dynasty. After their submission was accepted, Yao Xiang was appointed General Who Pacifies the North and a few other positions. In 352, Yao Yizhong died, and before his death, he advised his sons to join Jin in the south now that the Shi clan had been destroyed. Yao Xiang succeeded his father but kept his death a secret.

He attacked the counties of Fagan (發乾; present-day Guan County, Shandong), Yangping (陽平; present-day Shen County, Shandong) and Yuancheng (元城; present-day Daming County, Hebei) before stopping at Que'ao Crossing (碻磝, in present-day Chiping District, Shandong) to hand out appointments. He then continued his journey, encountering Former Qin forces and suffering a defeat at Matian (麻田, east of present-day Luoyang, Henan) along the way. At Matian, Yao Xiang's horse was shot, so Yao Chang gave his horse to Xiang to allow him to escape. Fortunately for the two, reinforcements arrived in time to save them. Yao Xiang's group finally arrived in Jin at Xingyang, where only then he commenced the traditional mourning ritual for his father.

Yao Xiang sent five of his younger brothers to the Jin capital of Jiankang as hostages. The court accepted them and stationed Yao Xiang at Qiao (譙; present-day Bozhou, Anhui). The southlands were almost immediately charmed by Yao Xiang's personality and respected him greatly. Around this time, Yao Xiang visited the Jin official Xie Shang at Shouchun. Despite Xiang wearing a headscarf, Xie Shang easily recognised who he was, and the two quickly became close friends.

== As general of Jin ==
=== Yin Hao's first northern expedition ===
At the time of Yao Xiang's entry into the Jin dynasty, the Jin commander, Yin Hao, was carrying out his northern campaign. Yin Hao's target at the time was to capture the city of Xuchang from the warlord, Zhang Yu. In July 352, Yao Xiang and Xie Shang attacked the city. In response, Former Qin's Heavenly King, Fu Jiàn, sent Fu Xiong and Fu Jing (苻靚) to repel them and receive Zhang Yu. Xie Shang was defeated at Chengqiao (誠橋; near Xuchang) at the Ying River, causing him to retreat to Huainan. After hearing of Xie Shang's defeat, Yao Xiang abandoned his baggages to escort him to safety at Que Slope (芍陂; south of present-day Shou County, Anhui). Once at Que, Xie Shang left all matters in Yao Xiang's hands. The defeat forced Yin Hao's return to Shouchun and led to Xie Shang's demotion.

=== Escaping assassination ===
In 353, Yao Xiang believed that Former Qin and Former Yan had both grown strong, and to attack them would only result in defeat. Instead, he decided to set up military agricultural farms along the Huai River to train troops and strengthen Jin's frontier for the future. Meanwhile, Yin Hao began to worry about Yao Xiang's growing influence and was eager to get rid of him. Yin Hao had Yao Xiang's younger brothers imprisoned before sending assassins against him. However, the assassins all thought highly of Yao Xiang and instead revealed the plot to him. Soon, Yin Hao sent a general named Wei Jing (魏憬) to launch a surprise attack on Yao Xiang, but Wei Jing was defeated and killed instead.

With both of his assassination plots having failed, Yin Hao decided to move Yao Xiang somewhere far from him. He had his general, Liu Qi (劉啟) stationed at Qiao and ordered Xiang to move from Qiao to Litai (蠡台) in Liang state. Meanwhile, Yao Xiang became increasingly worried as he noticed that Wei Jing's sons and brothers were constantly visiting Yin Hao's base in Shouchun. Yao Xiang sent his advisor Quan Yi to discuss the issue with Yin Hao. The two men's meeting only confirmed their side's suspicion for one another and sowed further distrust.

=== Yin Hao's second northern expedition ===
Yin Hao marched north again in winter of 353, with Yao Xiang served as his vanguard. However, Yao Xiang now had the intention to break away from Jin. When Yin Hao's army were close by, Yao Xiang pretended to flee north during the night while setting up ambushes for pursuing Jin forces. When Yin Hao heard about Yao Xiang's actions, he chased after Yao Xiang all the way to Shansang (山桑; in present-day Mengcheng County, Anhui). Yao Xiang's ambushes devastated Yin Hao's army as they killed and captured thousands of their forces. Yin Hao was forced to abandon his supplies and weapon before retreating to Qiao, allowing Yao Xiang to claim them for himself. Yao Xiang then left his brother Yao Yi (姚益) to guard Shansang while he returned south to Huainan.

== As an independent warlord ==
=== Campaigns against Jin ===
Yin Hao sent Liu Qi and Wang Binzhi (王彬之) to attack Shansang, but Yao Xiang turned back from Huainan to attack them. After killing Liu and Wang, Yao Xiang marched to Que Slope and captured it. Soon, Yao Xiang crossed the Huai River and camped at Xuyi, where he gathered thousands of refugees and officials under his wing. He instructed his followers to farm and start silkworm cultivation while he sent envoys to Jiankang denouncing Yin Hao and apologising for actions. In response, the Jin court positioned Xie Shang at Liyang, in hopes that his friendship with Xiang would be enough to win him back.

The following year, Yao Xiang submitted to Former Yan and was appointed Inspector of Yuzhou and Duke of Danyang by Murong Jun. Later, a refugee leader named Guo Chang (郭敞) rebelled against Jin and captured Tangyi Commandery (堂邑, north of modern day Luhe District, Nanjing) along with its Interior Minister, Liu Shi (劉仕). Guo surrendered the commandery to Yao Xiang, which caused the Jin court to panic as this left Jiankang exposed to Xiang. The capital's defenses were tightened, and Xie Shang was moved from Liyang to the capital region to defend the Yangtze.

In 355, Yao Xiang declared himself Grand Chanyu and Grand General. Many of Xiang's followers were northerners, and because of this, they urged him to march north so that they could return home. Yao Xiang agreed, and along the way, he fought with the Jin general Gao Ji (高季) at Waihuang (外黃, east of modern day Qi County, Henan). He was defeated at first, but managed to regather his scattered troops and continued the assault. Gao eventually died of natural causes, allowing Xiang to overcome his leaderless army. Xiang then advanced to Xuchang and occupied the city.

=== Huan Wen's second northern expedition ===
The next year in 356, Huan Wen was appointed by Jin as Grand Commander of the Expeditionary Force to campaign against Yao Xiang. At the same time, Yao Xiang led his army to capture Luoyang from the warlord Zhou Cheng (周成). He planned to establish a base in the Hedong region (河東; around present-day Shanxi) before pressing on to conquer Guandong. However, he was unable to capture Luoyang even after a month of siege. His Chief Clerk Wang Liang (王亮) advised him to retreat, but he refused, refuting his argument by claiming that Luoyang would make a valuable stronghold. Not long after, Wang Liang died, and Yao Xiang became remorseful of his death.

Soon enough, Huan Wen arrived at the Yi River, and Yao Xiang was forced to break off his siege in order to face him. Yao Xiang sent Huan Wen a letter that read, "I see you have brought the royal troops. I am now obliged to return to the rightful authority. If you would please order your army to draw back somewhat, we will gladly bow and pay our obeisance at the side of the road." Huan Wen, however, rejected him, replying, "I have come to recover the Central Plains and pay respect to the imperial tombs, so for that, I have no business with you. Those who wish to present themselves will do so in person, not send another in his place." The two fought at the river, and in the end, Huan Wen emerged victorious. Yao Xiang lost several thousands of his men, so he retreated with his army to the north of Luoyang.

Despite this, Xiang's defeat did not encourage many to surrender to Huan Wen. Yao Xiang was reputed to be brave and kind to the people, and wherever he was present, families would often rush to join him. While Yao Xiang fled, more than 5,000 men in Luoyang abandoned their families to join him during the night, and when rumours of Yao Xiang's death circulated, the men and women of Xuchang and Luoyang mourned him. Huan Wen gave chase but was unable to capture Yao Xiang. However, one of Yao Xiang's officer, Yang Liang, turned back and surrendered to Huan. Huan Wen asked him what kind of man Yao Xiang was, to which he said, "Yao Xiang has divine wisdom and a broad mind, just like Sun Ce, but in valor and martial prowess he surpasses even the latter".

=== Campaign against Former Qin ===
Not long after his defeat at Luoyang, Yao Xiang invaded Former Qin's Pingyang County. He placed the county's Administrator, Fu Chan (苻產), under siege at Fort Xiongnu (匈奴堡). Qin's Prince of Jin, Fu Liu attempted to help Fu Chan, but was driven back by Yao Xiang. Eventually, Yao Xiang captured Fort Xiongnu, executed Fu Chan and slaughtered his soldiers. Yao Xiang also received the surrender of Qin's Inspector of Bingzhou, Yin Chi (尹赤), who used to be one of Yao Xiang's subordinate.

Yao Xiang then sent an envoy to Qin's emperor, Fu Sheng, demanding permission to cross his territory in order to return to Yao Xiang's homeland in Longxi. Fu Sheng at first considered agreeing to Yao Xiang's proposal, but at the advice of his cousin, Fu Jiān, who feared that Yao Xiang may become a threat to Qin in Longxi, refused. Instead, Fu Sheng sent his own envoys to confer Yao Xiang with ranks and titles. Fu Sheng hoped that this would put Yao Xiang at ease, allowing him to attack Yao Xiang while his guard was down.

However, Yao Xiang rejected his ranks and titles. He beheaded Fu Sheng's envoys and burned their seals and books before sending them back to Fu Sheng. He then attacked and plundered Hedong Commandery, where he was able to capture Xiangling County (襄陵: in present-day Sui County, Henan). Qin's Grand General, Zhang Ping campaigned and eventually defeated Yao Xiang, prompting Yao Xiang to seek peace with Zhang Ping. The two men were able to befriend each other in the process, to the point that they swore an oath of brotherhood. In the end, they agreed to withdraw their army from one another.

== Death and posthumous honours ==
In the summer of 357, Yao Xiang intended to conquer the Guanzhong region from Former Qin. Yao Xiang camped at Xingcheng (杏城, in present-day Yan'an, Shaanxi), where he sent Yao Lan (姚蘭) to attack Fucheng as well as Yao Yisheng (姚益生) and Wang Qinlu (王欽盧) to get the surrender of the Qiang people. However, they were defeated by Fu Fei (苻飛), and Yao Lan was taken prisoner. Fu Sheng responded by sending his generals, Deng Qiang and Fu Huangmei (苻黃眉), to defeat Yao Xiang. Yao Xiang initially refused to come out of Xingcheng and stuck to his defenses, but he soon became tempted to march out. A Buddhist monk named Zhitong (智通) warned him against this, but Xiang said, "Two roosters cannot perch on the same branch. I trust that Heaven will not abandon the virtuous, and will instead save our people. My plan is decided."

Meanwhile, Deng Qiang knew that Yao Xiang was flustered by his recent defeats to Huan Wen and Zhang Ping. He proposed a plan to Fu Huangmei in which he would lead his troops straight into Xingcheng, making loud noises with their drums and wildly waving their flags to lure Yao Xiang out. Deng Qiang did so and Yao Xiang was immediately provoked. Yao Xiang quickly brought his army out to fight, and Deng Qiang feigned a retreat. Yao Xiang pursued him until they reached Sanyuan, where they were met with Qin forces under Fu Huangmei and Fu Jiān. Yao Xiang was badly defeated, and he attempted to flee on his horse, Limeigua (黧眉騧). However, his horse fell, and this time he was killed.

Yao Chang took over Yao Xiang's army and surrendered to Former Qin. Yao Xiang was given a ducal funeral by Fu Sheng, while his father Yao Yizhong, whose coffin he carried around, was given one for a prince. Yao Chang would become an important general in Former Qin but following Qin's disastrous defeat at the Battle of Feishui and his fall out with Fu Jiān, he would establish his state of Later Qin in 384, posthumously naming his brother 'Prince Wu of Wei'.

== Cao Cao's Mausoleum ==
In 2008, the mausoleum of Cao Cao, a famous warlord during the fall of the Han dynasty, had been discovered. However, some historians cast their doubts that the mausoleum is that of Cao Cao's. One in particularly is Hu Juezhao (胡觉照), a history professor at the Xi'an Municipal Party Committee School, who claimed in an interview in 2010 that the mausoleum actually belongs to Yao Xiang.
