= GOH =

GOH or Goh may refer to:

- Gôh, a region of Ivory Coast
- Goh (Chinese surname)
- Goh (Korean surname)
- Gō (given name), a masculine Japanese given name
- General Overhaul Program of New York City Subway cars
- Glory of Heracles (series), a video game series
- Goh Hinogami, a character from the Virtual Fighter video game series
- Grand Opera House, Belfast
- Grand Opera House, Manhattan
- Grand Opera House, Wilmington, Delaware
- Grand Opera House, York
- Grand Oriental Hotel in Colombo, Sri Lanka
- Guest of honour
- Nuuk Airport in Greenland
- Team Goh, a Japanese auto racing team
- The God of High School, a Korean web manhwa
- Goh, a character in the video game Shinobido: Way of the Ninja
- Goh (Pokémon), a protagonist in the Pokémon TV series
- G.O.H. (1916–1932), Grand Opera House, Sydney, Australia
- Nuuk Airport, Greenland (IATA:GOH)
- Old High German, a language (ISO 639:goh)
