= Empress Gou =

Empress of the Qin Dynasty

Empress Gou (苟皇后, personal name unknown) was an empress of the Di-led Former Qin dynasty of China. Her husband was Fu Jiān, who created her empress in 355 after seizing the throne from his violent and cruel cousin Fu Sheng even though he claimed only the title of "Heavenly King" (Tian Wang).

Very little is known about Empress Gou. She might have been a relative of Fu Jiān's mother Empress Dowager Gou, but there is not enough evidence. She was still alive in 359, when she participated in a ceremonial feeding of silkworms, but there was no further record of her in history, including whether she survived to her husband's death in 385.

When Fu Jiān's crown prince Fu Hong fled to Jin in 385, he was recorded to have done so with his mother, who was likely to be Empress Gou.

Chinese royalty
Preceded by Empress Liang	Empress of China (Shaanxi); 357–385	Succeeded by Empress She of Later Qin
Preceded by Empress Liang	Empress of Former Qin; 357–385	Succeeded by Empress Yang
Preceded by Empress Xin of Former Liang	Empress of China (Gansu); 376–385	Succeeded by Empress Yang
Preceded by Empress Kezuhun of Former Yan	Empress of China (Shanxi); 370–385	
Preceded by Empress Kezuhun of Former Yan	Empress of China (Northeastern); 370–384	Succeeded by Empress Duan Yuanfei of Later Yan
Preceded by Empress Kezuhun of Former Yan	Empress of China (Luoyang region); 370–384	Succeeded by Empress Wang Shen'ai of Jin
Preceded by Empress Wang Fahui of Jin	Empress of China (Central); 379–384	Succeeded by Empress Wang Shen'ai of Jin
Preceded by Empress Wang Fahui of Jin	Empress of China (Southwestern); 376–385	
