= Gohs =

Gohs or GOHS may refer to:

- Rolf Gohs (born 1933), Swedish comic creator

== Schools ==
- GlenOak High School, Canton, Ohio, United States
- Glen Oaks High School, Baton Rouge, Louisiana, United States
- Great Oak High School, Blaine County, San Andreas, United States

== See also ==
- GOH (disambiguation)
