= Shi Yue =

Shi Yue or Shiyue may refer to:

== People ==
- Shi Yue (Former Qin) (died 384), military general of Former Qin
- Shi Yue (Go player) (born 1991), Chinese Go player
- Shi Yue (fencer) (born 1999), Chinese fencer

== Others ==
- Shiyue (month), the tenth month of the Chinese calendar
- Shiyue, Chinese literary magazine
