= Shi Yue (Former Qin) =

Former Qin general (died 384)

- 石越

Gentleman of the Yellow Gates (黃門侍郎)
- In office ?–?
- Monarch: Fu Jian

General Who Conquers The Caitiffs (征虜將軍)
- In office 378 – ?
- Monarch: Fu Jian

Colonel of Camped Cavalry (屯騎校尉)
- In office 380 – ?
- Monarch: Fu Jian

Inspector of Pingzhou (平州刺史)
- In office 380 – ?
- Monarch: Fu Jian

Crown Prince's Guard Leader of the Left (太子左衛率)
- In office ?–?
- Monarch: Fu Jian

General Who Conquers The Caitiffs (征虜將軍)
- In office 370 – ?
- Monarch: Fu Jian

General of Agile Cavalry (驍騎將軍)
- In office 383 – 384
- Monarch: Fu Jian

Personal details
- Born: Unknown Xingping, Shaanxi
- Died: 384

Shi Yue (died 384) was a military general of Former Qin during the Sixteen Kingdoms period. Initially starting out as an envoy to Former Yan, he helped the Qin army in capturing Xiangyang and in quelling the rebellion of Fu Jian's cousin, Fu Luo. He was most noted to be one of the main oppositions towards Fu Jian's plan to conquer the Jin dynasty (266–420) in 382, whose failure to win him over led to the disastrous defeat of the Qin army at the Battle of Feishui. After the defeat, he was entrusted the important task of defending Ye, where he urged Fu Pi to get rid of the suspicious Murong Chui but failing to convince his superior once more. Shi was killed in battle against Murong Nong in 384, and his head was used as an offering to Nong's father, Chui.

== Life ==
Nothing much is known about Shi Yue's early life and background apart from him being a native of Shiping (始平, in modern Xingping, Shaanxi). His first appearance in historical records was in 369; he was already a Gentleman of the Yellow Gate by that time. That year, Fu Jian sent Shi to Former Yan to act as an envoy after Yan's triumph over Jin and before their war with Qin. Yan's emperor regent, Murong Ping, treated him lavishly and showed off the state's wealth, but his ministers warned him against it, as they say Shi was only in Yan to observe the state's condition. Ping, however, chose to ignore them. Yan was later conquered by Qin in 370 after a brief and decisive war.

=== Siege of Xiangyang ===
For the next nine years, Shi Yue grew to become General Who Conquers the Caitiffs. In 378, Fu Jian planned a massive siege on Xiangyang and had Shi lead ten thousand cavalries from Luyang (魯陽; present-day Lushan County, Henan). When Qin forces reached the Mian River (沔水), the Inspector of Liangzhou, Zhu Xu, did not think that the Qin forces were a threat as they did not have any boats, so he paid little concern for them. Shi Yue used this to his advantage. He led 5,000 of his cavalries to swim across the Han River and took Xiangyang by surprise. Zhu Xu withdrew into the city defences while Shi Yue secured the outskirts of the city and captured hundreds of boats for the Qin forces to cross over. The siege of Xiangyang lasted for a year before it was eventually captured in 379 after its Protector, Li Bohu (李伯護), allowed the Qin troops to enter and capture Zhu Xu.

=== Fu Luo's rebellion ===
In 380, Fu Jian's cousins, Fu Luo and Fu Chong (苻重) were both disgruntled at Fu Jian's treatment of them and staged a rebellion in Youzhou. Fu Jian sent his generals Lü Guang and Dou Chong to quell them, and after defeating them at Zhongshan, the brothers scattered. Luo was sent to Chang'an while Chong was killed in battle. Shi Yue, serving as Colonel of Camped Cavalry, led ten thousand cavalries to cross the Bohai Sea from Donglai and surprise attacked the rebel's base in Helong. Fu Luo's main co-conspirator, Ping Gui (平規), was killed during the assault and the rebellion was put down. On August 380, Fu Jian split Pingzhou (平州, in modern Qinhuangdao, Hebei) off of Youzhou and made Shi Yue its first Inspector.

=== Battle of Feishui ===
In 382, Fu Jian intended to conquer the southlands from Jin and unify China once and for all. This was met with strong rebuttal from some of his officials such as Fu Rong, Quan Yi, Dao'an and Shi Yue himself. Shi Yue said to him, "The Year and Guard Star currently sits in the South Dipper, fortune lies in Wu. Your attempt to cut them down now will surely bring disaster. Moreover, there is the danger of the Yangtze River, and its people are likely to use it to their advantage. It is impossible to attack them." However, Fu Jian argued, "In the past, King Wu attacked Zhou and disobeyed divinations. The way of heaven is distant and unknown. Fuchai and Sun Hao both relied on their rivers and lakes yet could not escape demise. My army is so huge that if all my men throw their whips into the Yangtze, its flow will stop, so what danger would there be?"

Shi Yue was not swayed by his reasoning. He further said to Fu Jian, "The three lords you mentioned were all sadistic and unruly. Therefore, their enemies conquered them as easy as picking something off the ground. Although there is no virtue in Jin, their crimes are not punish worthy. May Your Majesty build up your army and wait for the provocation." After lengthy discussions in the court, Fu Jian concluded to carry out his campaign in the end. Fu Jian attacked Jin in 382 but was greatly routed in 383 at the Battle of Feishui. Once he return to the north, Fu Jian assigned his generals to different locations to prevent any form of uprising from occurring. This included Shi Yue, who was given 3,000 elite cavalry to guard Ye.

=== Post-Fei River ===
Rebellions began just as expected, with Qifu Guoren and Zhai Bin being among the first. The Xianbei general, Murong Chui, was sent to attack Zhai Bin but deep down he too had intentions to rebel. Shi Yue warned Fu Jian's son, Fu Pi, against sending any reinforcements to Murong Chui. However, Fu Pi was certain that Murong Chui and Zhai Bin will weaken each other anyway, so he simply sent 2,000 weak soldiers with faulty equipment and 1,000 cavalries led by Fu Feilong (苻飛龍) to assist Murong Chui. Later, an incident occur in Ye where Murong Chui murdered a number of pavilion attendants for not letting him enter the Ancestral Temple of Yan and set the pavilion on fire. Shi Yue urged Fu Pi to use this as justification to kill Chui, but Pi refused, stating Chui's deeds in escorting his father back north after the Battle of Feishui. After withdrawing, Shi Yue lamented and told to the others, "The father and son are bound to these petty acts of benevolence regardless of the bigger picture. We will all be captives at the end of this."

As a result, Chui succeeded in breaking away in 384 and his son, Murong Nong, rose up in support of him. Fu Pi sent Shi Yue to campaign against Murong Nong at Lieren (列人, in modern Feixiang District, Hebei). Despite urges for him to remain in Lieren and defend, Nong chose a more aggressive stance and led his troops to face Shi Yue directly. Shi Yue arrived west of Lieren, where his vanguard was attacked and defeated by Nong's Army Advisor, Qiwu Teng (綦毋滕). Nong then mounted a defence and waited for an opportunity to strike, seeing that Shi had better-equipped soldiers than him. Despite Shi's advantage over Nong, Shi decided to build a barrier and go on the defense, much to Nong's delight. When night came, Nong sent his general Liu Mu (劉木) to break through the barrier as Nong's army followed closely behind. The Qin army was greatly defeated, and Shi Yue was killed. Murong Nong beheaded Shi and sent his head to his father.
