= Yang Yu (Former Yan) =

- 陽裕

Marshal of the Left to the General-in-Chief (大將軍左司馬)
- In office 341–?
- Monarch: Murong Huang

Personal details
- Born: Unknown Ji County, Tianjin
- Died: Unknown
- Relations: Yang Wu (cousin)
- Courtesy name: Shilun (士倫)

Yang Yu (fl.304–345), courtesy name Shilun, was an official of the Jin dynasty (266–420) and the Former Yan during the Sixteen Kingdoms period. During the fall of Western Jin, Yang Yu fled to the Duan tribe in Liaoxi, where he served under five successive rulers as a minister. When the Duan were conquered in 338, he briefly joined the Later Zhao before he was captured in battle by the Former Yan. The Prince of Former Yan, Murong Huang greatly favoured Yang Yu, and he most importantly oversaw the construction of the city of Longcheng, which became the ancestral capital of the Murong.

== Life ==
=== Background ===
Yang Yu was a native of Wuzhong County (無終; in present-day Ji County, Tianjin) in Youbeiping Commandery. His parents and siblings all died when he was young, so he grew having to fend for himself. His relatives also did not recognize his potential, except for his uncle Yang Dan (陽耽), who once remarked, "This child is not only the most outstanding among our family, but he will be a valuable asset to the times."

=== Service under Wang Jun ===
In 304, the Prince of Chengdu, Sima Ying appointed He Yan (和演) as the new Inspector of You province in opposition to Wang Jun, who held the office at the time. Yang Yu accepted an invitation from He Yan to serve as his Registrar, but that same year, He was killed Wang Jun, who then transferred Yang Yu to the position of Assistant Officer in the Headquarters Office. However, Wang Jun disliked Yang Yu and refused to give him any important positions.

In 314, Wang Jun was defeated and captured by the Han-Zhao general, Shi Le at his capital in Ji. Shi Le asked one of Wang's officials, Zao Song (棗嵩) to recommend him a talent to recruit. Zao Song named Yang Yu to be appointed as a minister, but as Shi Le was about to employ him, Yang Yu disguised himself and escaped, fleeing to the Duan tribe at Lingzhi (令支, in present-day Qian'an, Hebei) in the east.

=== Service under the Duan tribe ===
The chieftain of the Duan, Duan Jilujuan learned of Yang Yu's arrival and welcomed him. Yang said to his friend, Cheng Pan (成泮), "Zhongni (Confucius) rejoiced at the invitation of Bi Xi (佛肸) and likened himself to a gourd. Yi Yin also once said, "Whom may I not serve? What people may I not serve?" Even the sages and worthies were like this, let alone us. Now that I have been summoned, will it all be in vain?" Cheng replied, "The Huaxia is in ruins, the Nine Provinces are divided and all that is left behind us is the Yi river (易水; in present-day Yi County, Hebei). Those who wish to remain stagnant and expect a greater future are like those who await the clearing of the Yellow River. How long is a human life? The ancients used to lament its fleeting nature. As Shaoyou (Qin Guan), even a minor official can provide for his descendants, how much more so a great minister? Follow in the footsteps of Yi Yin and Confucius, and you will know their divine wisdom."

Thus, Yang Yu followed his friend's advice and submitted to Duan Jilujuan, who appointed him as Prefect of the Gentlemen of the Palace and General of the Central Army. Yang eventually rose to the position of senior minister and served five successive rulers from Jilujuan to Duan Liao. He was highly valued by the Duan rulers, and his fellow minister, Lu Chen always praised him by saying, "I have seen many court officials since the times of peace under Jin, but only few are as loyal, upright and righteous as Yang Shilun."

In 337, the Duan was in conflict with the Later Zhao in the west and the Former Yan to the east in Liaodong. Yang Yu warned Duan Liao that disaster was imminent, and that he should mend his relations with the Prince of Former Yan, Murong Huang. However, Duan Liao disagreed, and he eventually removed Yang Yu from the central government by appointed him as Administrator of Yan Commandery and Chancellor of Beiping.

As Yang had feared, the Later Zhao and Former Yan carried out a joint military campaign against the Duan in 338. As the Heavenly King of Zhao, Shi Hu encroached on Lingzhi, Yang Yu led thousands of families up Mount Yan (燕山; in present-day Jizhou, Tianjin) and set up defence. The Zhao generals were worried that Yang Yu would attack their rear if they continued to advance, but Shi Hu said, "Yu is merely a Confucian scholar and has not surrendered only because he feared for his reputation. He will not be of any danger to us." Thus, they left him alone and advanced to Xuwu (徐無; west of present-day Zunhua, Hebei).

=== Brief stint under Later Zhao ===
After the fall of Lingzhi, Yang Yu descended the mountain and surrendered with his followers. Shi Hu scolded him by saying, "You once fled like a slave but now come to me as a scholar. Do you understand the will of Heaven or do you just have nowhere else to hide?" Yang Yu replied, "I once served Lord Wang (Wang Jun), but I could not save him from disaster. I then fled to the Duan, but they too could not escape unscathe. Now, Your Majesty's vast net of Heaven encompasses the Four Seas. The heroes of You and Ji provinces all flock to you, and I feel no shame in standing shoulder to shoulder with them. The fate of my life rests solely in the hands of Your Majesty." Shi Hu was pleased with his response and appointed him as Administrator of Beiping. Yang Yu was even invited to join the central government in Zhao and appointed as Assistant of the Left of the Masters of Writing.

Later that year, Duan Liao, who had been hiding in Mount Miyun (密雲山; in present-day Miyun District, Beijing), requested to surrender to Later Zhao. Shi Hu tasked Yang Yu with acting as a guide for his general, Ma Qiu to lead 30,000 troops to welcome his former liege. However, during their march, they were ambushed by the Former Yan general, Murong Ke and suffered a crushing defeat. Yang Yu was captured by the Yan army and sent to Murong Huang.

=== Servince under Former Yan ===
At the time, Yang Yu's cousin and Yang Dan's son, Yang Wu, was working as a key official for the Former Yan. Murong Huang had also heard of Yang Yu's reputation, so he was released from prison and appointed as Prefect of the Household Gentlemen. He was later transferred to Interior Minister of Tangguo.

In 341, Murong Huang began constructing his new capital at Longcheng, and because Yang Yu was skilled in architecture and design, he was entrusted with the construction of all aspects of the city, from the walls and palace to the ancestral temples. The new palace he built was named Helong Palace, and months later, he was moved to the office of Left Marshal to the General-in-Chief. The construction of Longcheng was completed in 342, after which it became Murong Huang's new capital. Between that year and 345, Murong Huang carried out several military campaigns, forcing Goguryeo into submission and conquering the Yuwen tribe, both of which Yang Yu participated in.

Though Yang Yu joined relatively late, the favour that he received from Murong Huang far surpassed that of his long-serving retainers. Even as he became a high-ranking official in court, Yang Yu continued to behave as if he were a commoner, remaining humble and compassionate. Whenever his fellow scholar-in-exile died, he would personally conduct their funerals and raise their orphaned children. As a result, he was universally respected by the people, and when he eventually died at the age of 62, Murong Huang mourned his death deeply.
