= Fu Rong =

Chinese Former Qin general and official (died 383)

Fu Rong (苻融) (died 383), courtesy name Boxiu (伯休), formally Duke Ai of Yangping (陽平哀公), was an official and general of the Di-led Former Qin dynasty of China. He was a younger brother of Fu Jiān, the third emperor of the dynasty.

== Early life ==
Fu Rong, when he was young, was known for his virtues. His uncle, the state founder Fu Jiàn (note tone difference) wanted to make him the Prince of Anle. However, Fu Rong declined and although Fu Jiàn was surprised he accepted his nephew's refusal. After Fu Jiàn's death, his son and successor Fu Sheng greatly favored Fu Rong, and often had Fu Rong attend him in the palace.

After Fu Jiān overthrew the arbitrarily violent Fu Sheng in 357 and claimed the title of "Heavenly King" (Tian Wang), he made Fu Rong the Duke of Yangping, and made Fu Rong one of his chief advisors. Ancient historians left behind records stating that Fu Rong was a tall and handsome gentleman, and that he was intelligent with an excellent memory, he was also physically strong, skilled at horsemanship, archery, as well as the use of spears. They also stated that he was skillful at ruling on legal cases and in governing the state. In 359, Fu Jiān offered to make Wang Meng the prime minister, but Wang Meng initially declined and recommended Fu Rong instead. Fu Jiān refused to accept Wang's declination. Throughout the years, Fu Rong largely acted as a voice for caution, urging Fu Jiān against risky actions. For example, in 360, Fu Jiān was going to relocate some Wuhuan and Xianbei tribes that had surrendered near the capital Chang'an, but after Fu Rong argued that it was too risky to locate recently surrendered peoples near the capital, Fu Jiān relented.

== Career as Fu Jiān's advisor ==
After Former Qin destroyed rival Former Yan in 370, Fu Jiān initially put Wang Meng in charge of the six provinces that Former Yan possessed, as viceroy, but in 372 he recalled Wang to again be prime minister, and made Fu Rong the viceroy of the six provinces. Although he was away from the capital, he urged Fu Jiān not to incorporate so many Xianbei officials (particularly those from Former Yan's imperial Murong clan) into his own government, a suggestion Fu Jiān did not accept. Indeed, from this point on, although it was clear that Fu Jiān still trusted his brother deeply, he rarely listened to Fu Rong's cautionary suggestions.

In 379, while Fu Jiān's son Fu Pi was sieging the Jin city Xiangyang (襄陽, in modern Xiangfan, Hubei), Fu Jiān had initially ordered Fu Rong to mobilize the six eastern provinces and meet him personally at Xiangyang, but at Fu Rong's urgings (that it would be overly costly to mobilize so many troops for the battle at Xiangyang), Fu Jiān cancelled the order.

In 380, when his cousin Fu Luo (苻洛) the Duke of Xingtang rebelled in You Province (幽州, modern Beijing, Tianjin, and northern Hebei), Fu Rong was the supreme commander of the forces attacking Fu Luo, although he did not personally engage Fu Luo before the general Lü Guang defeated and captured Fu Luo. Later that year, Fu Jiān recalled Fu Rong to serve as a prime minister, replacing Wang Meng, who had died in 375. Fu Pi took over as viceroy of the six provinces.

In 382, Fu Rong urged against a campaign that Fu Jiān launched, under Lü's command, against the Xiyu kingdoms, but Fu Jiān did not listen to him.

== Battle of Fei River ==
Late that year, Fu Jiān resolved to attack Jin, hoping to destroy and unite China. Most officials were opposed. He summoned Fu Rong to a private conversation, hoping that Fu Rong would support it, but Fu Rong, citing Wang's urging against it on his deathbed, opposed—arguing that it would be a dangerous venture and that what Fu Jiān truly had to look out for were the Xianbei and Qiang generals who might rebel. Fu Jiān did not listen to him, but instead put him in charge of commanding the invasion force against Jin. In 383, the campaign was launched, as Fu Rong led some 300,000 men and headed toward the Jin city of Shouyang (壽陽, in modern Lu'an, Anhui), capturing it with relative ease. Fu Jiān soon joined him personally, and they prepared further movements. However, Jin forces, commanded by Xie Shi (謝石), dealt Fu Rong's forward troops minor defeats, and the morale dropped. Eventually, the armies were stalemated across the Fei River (which no longer exists but probably flowed through Lu'an, near the Huai River), Former Qin forces to the west and Jin forces to the east.

The Jin general Xie Xuan sent a message to Fu Rong, suggesting that the Former Qin forces retreat slightly to allow Jin forces to cross the Fei River, so that the armies could engage. Fu Jiān overruled the generals' reluctance for the plan, wanting to attack Jin forces as they were crossing the river, and Fu Rong agreed, ordering a retreat. However, the Former Qin forces fell into a panic while retreating, and Jin forces attacked. Fu Rong tried to personally calm the troops, but as he was doing so, his horse suddenly fell, and he was killed by Jin forces. His death brought further panic to the Former Qin forces, and it entirely collapsed. Former Qin would not able to restart its attack against Jin, and a chain of events eventually led to its near destruction in 385.
