= Guest of honour =

Guest of honour (or honor) may refer to:

== Film, television and theatre ==
- Guest of Honour (1934 film), a British comedy film directed by George King
- Guest of Honour (2019 film), a Canadian drama film by Atom Egoyan
- A Guest of Honor (opera), a 1903 opera by Scott Joplin
- "Guest of Honour" (Upstairs, Downstairs), a television episode

== Literature ==
- A Guest of Honour (novel), a 1970 novel Nadine Gordimer
- Guest of Honor, a 1993 comic book penciled by Michael Zulli
- "Guest of Honor", a 1993 story by Robert Reed
- Guests of honor, authors, editors or active fans specially honored at a science fiction convention
