= Ma Qiu =

Later Zhao and Former Qin general (died 350)

- 麻秋

Inspector of Liangzhou (涼州刺史)
- In office 346 – 350
- Monarch: Shi Hu/Shi Shi/Shi Zun/Shi Jian

General Who Directs The Army (軍師將軍)
- In office 350 – 350
- Monarch: Pu Hong

Personal details
- Born: Unknown Taiyuan, Shanxi
- Died: 350

Ma Qiu (died 350) was a military general of Later Zhao and Former Qin during the Sixteen Kingdoms period. Ma Qiu participated in Zhao's campaigns against Former Yan and Former Liang. During the confusion of Shi Hu's death, he sided with Ran Min, helping in his order to exterminate the barbarians. However, he was captured by Fu Jiàn, Pu Hong's son, and executed after his attempted coup which resulted in Pu Hong's death.

== Service under Later Zhao ==
Ma Qiu was from a tribal family that lived in Taiyuan Commandery, although his later participation in Ran Min's ethnic cleansing of the Jie and hu people suggests that he may actually be Han Chinese. He had served Later Zhao during the time of Shi Le. He was described as a fierce and dangerous man. According to the Taiping Yulan, it was popular during his time for mothers to stop their children from crying by telling them that Ma Qiu would come for them.

Ma Qiu's earliest mentions was in 333, during Shi Hu's control over the emperor Shi Hong. Around this time, the powerful Di chieftain Pu Hong broke away from Later Zhao. Shi Hu sent Ma Qiu to subdue him, but Pu Hong immediately surrendered without a fight. Shi Hu valued Pu Hong's influence over the Di, so he did not punish but rather rewarded him.

=== War with Former Yan ===
Ma Qiu was involved in the joint Later Zhao and Former Yan campaign against the Duan tribe in 338. Ma Qiu and Guo Tai (郭太) pursued the tribe's leader, Duan Liao to Mount Miyun, capturing his mother and wife and slaughtering his troops. The Duan tribe was on the verge of collapsing but by this point, Shi Hu had realized that Yan was not interested in letting Zhao benefit from the war. Shi Hu ordered Ma Qiu to retrieve Duan Liao, who had offered his surrender at Mount Miyun. The Yan general Murong Ke ambushed Ma Qiu at Sanzangkou (三藏口, in present-day Chengde, Hebei), leaving three-fifths of his army dead. Ma Qiu returned on foot to an angered Shi Hu, who stripped him off his titles and offices.

=== War with Former Liang ===
Despite his demotion, he eventually returned to prominence as the Inspector of Liangzhou by 346. That year, Shi Hu launched an invasion on the Former Liang and had him attack Jincheng with Sun Fudu. The Administrator of Jincheng, Zhang Chong (張沖) surrendered to Ma Qiu, although the Prefect, Che Ji (車濟) refused and killed himself. Impressed with his loyalty, Ma Qiu gave him a proper burial. The Liang ruler, Zhang Chonghua sent his official, Xie Ai to repel the invaders, and he greatly routed them at Zhenwu (振武; in present-day Yongdeng County, Gansu).

Soon after, Shi Hu ordered Ma Qiu to attack Daxia (大夏; northwest of Guanghe County, Gansu). Ma Qiu captured the city after the Liang general, Liang Shi (梁式) arrested the Administrator, Song Yan (宋晏) and handed over the city. He instructed Song Yan to writing a letter to the Commandant of Wanshu (宛戍, in present-day Guanghe, Gansu), Song Ju (宋矩) into surrendering, but Song Ju refused. Instead, after declaring his loyalty to the Liang in front of Ma Qiu, he killed his wife and children before committing suicide. Much like he did with Che Ji, Ma Qiu commended his loyalty and provided him a burial.

In 347, Ma Qiu continued his advances into Liang the following year by attacking Fuhan (枹罕, in present-day Linxia County, Gansu). Although he completely surrounded the city, the defences were sturdy. He used siege ladders and tunnels to breach their defenses but all these failed while getting thousands of his men killed. Zhao's general Liu Hun (劉渾) came to reinforce Ma Qiu but Liang's general Zhang Qu (張璩) arrived and viciously attacked the Zhao forces. Ma Qiu abandoned the siege and retreated to Daxia.

Shi Ning was sent in to further reinforce Ma Qiu. Xie Ai went to face Ma Qiu's army, riding a light carriage, wearing a white headdress and having drums played as he proceeded. Ma Qiu saw him foolish-looking and thought he was mocking him, so he sent his cavalries to fight him. However, Xie Ai refused to move, which makes the cavalries suspect an ambush, so they did not move further. With the cavalries away, a Liang army led by Zhang Mao attacked Ma Qiu's camp. The Zhao army scattered and Xie Ai joined in the fight. Ma Qiu was badly routed and fled alone on horseback to Daxia.

Ma Qiu returned with Shi Ning (石寧) and captured Fuhan before proceeding to Henei. Reinforced by Sun Fudu and Liu Hun, he attacked Zhang Chonghua's army. Meanwhile Xie Ai marched south-west and defeated Wang Zhuo before fighting Ma Qiu for the last time. Ma was defeated once more and fled to Jincheng, much to the frustration of Shi Hu.

Not long after, Ma Qiu launched his final invasion of Liang, which ended in success as he defeated their general, Zhang Mao. The Protector of Fuhan, Li Kui (李逵) surrendered to him along with thousands of Di and Qiang living south of the Yellow River.

== During the Ran Min Disturbance ==
Shi Hu passed away in 349, succeeded by his son Shi Shi. However, his brother Shi Zun overthrew him and started a series of four short-lived emperors in Zhao between 349 and 351. During Shi Shi and Shi Zun's reigns, Ma Qiu appears to a remained neutral. In 349, he repelled an invasion by Jin's Inspector of Liángzhou Sima Xun. The situation in Zhao worsened in 350 when Shi Hu's adopted grandson Ran Min broke away and established his state of Wei. While Ma Qiu marched to Luoyang together with Wang Lang, he received Ran Min's order to execute any living barbarian in sight. Ma Qiu complied and had many of Wang Lang's barbarian troops executed, causing Wang to flee.

Ma Qiu then marched to Yecheng to meet with Ran Min. However, he was intercepted by Pu Hong's son, Pu Xiong and captured. Pu Hong decided to make Ma Qiu his General Who Directs the Army. Later that year, Pu Hong declared himself King of the Three Qin and change his surname to Fu. Ma Qiu advised Fu Hong to concentrate in conquering Guanzhong while Ran Min and Shi Zhi were at war. Fu Hong agreed but Ma Qiu was not as loyal as he thought. At a feast, Ma Qiu took the chance to poison Fu Hong and take over his army. Though he successfully poisoned Fu Hong, he was quickly arrested and executed by Fu Hong's son, Fu Jian.

== Legend of Magu ==
In Chinese mythology, Magu is a female Taoist deity associated with the elixir of life. In some iterations of her, Ma Qiu is portrayed as her father. The most notable works that do this are the Complete Biographies of the Immortals (列仙全傳), written by the Ming dynasty author, Wang Shizhen and the Secret Collection of Jianhu (堅瓠秘集), written by the Qing dynasty author, Chu Renhuo.

In these works, Ma Qiu retains his fierce demeanour from history. He was put in charge of building fortifications and forced his workers to work day and night. They are only allowed to rest once they hear the cock's crow at dawn. Magu took pity on the workers, so she mimics the sound of a cock to give the workers earlier rests by crowing at an earlier hour. However, Ma Qiu soon found out and wanted to apprehend his daughter for this, but by then, she had fled to the mountains to pursue the Taoist arts.
