= Gō (given name) =

- Gender: Male

Origin
- Origin: Japanese
- Meaning: Different meanings depending on the kanji used

Gō, Go, Gou or Goh (written: 豪, 剛 or 郷) is a masculine Japanese given name. Notable people with the name include:

- Go Aoki (青木 豪; born 1999), Japanese curler
- Go Arisue (有末 剛), Japanese bondage artist
- Go Aruga (有賀 剛; born 1978), Japanese rugby union player
- Gō Ayano (綾野 剛; born 1982), Japanese actor
- Go Hatano (波多野 豪; born 1998), Japanese footballer
- Go Hayama (端山 豪; born 1993), Japanese footballer
- Go Higaki (桧垣 豪; born 1976), Japanese golfer
- Gō Ikeyamada (池山田 剛), Japanese female manga artist
- Go Iwase (磐瀬 剛; born 1995), Japanese footballer
- Go Jibiki (地曵 豪; born 1976), Japanese actor
- Go Kaburaki (鏑木 豪; born 1977), Japanese footballer
- Go Kamamoto (釜元 豪; born 1993), Japanese baseball player
- Go Matsumoto (松本 剛; born 1993), Japanese baseball player
- Go Murayama (村山 豪; born 1998), Japanese volleyball player
- Go Nagai (永井 豪; born 1945), Japanese manga artist and writer
- Go Nagaoka (長岡 郷; born 1984), Japanese footballer
- Goh Nakamura, American musician, film score composer and actor
- Go Nishida (西田 剛; born 1986), Japanese footballer
- Go Oiwa (大岩 剛; born 1972), Japanese footballer and manager
- Go Osaka (逢坂 剛; born 1943), Japanese writer
- Gō Rijū (利重 剛; born 1962), Japanese film director and actor
- Go Shibata (柴田 剛; born 1975), Japanese film director
- Go Shiina (椎名 豪; born 1974), Japanese anime and video game composer
- Go Shiozaki (潮﨑 豪; born 1982), Japanese professional wrestler
- Go Soeda (添田 豪; born 1984), Japanese tennis player
- Gō Takamine (高嶺 剛; born 1948), Japanese film director
- Go Togashi (富樫 豪; born 1984), Japanese footballer
- Gō Wakabayashi (若林 豪; born 1939), Japanese actor
- Go Yamamoto (山元 豪; born 1995), Japanese Nordic combined skier
- Go Yokoyama (横山 剛; born 1983), Japanese kickboxer
- Gō Zappa (雑破 業; born 1970), Japanese writer and anime screenwriter
