= Fu Jian (317–355) =

Emperor Jingming of Former Qin 前秦景明帝
- Emperor of Former Qin

Ruler of Former Qin
- Reign: 4 March 351 – 355
- Coronation: 4 March 351 (Heavenly King); 2 February 352 (Emperor)
- Predecessor: Fu Hong
- Successor: Fu Sheng
- Born: Pú Jiàn (蒲健); 317
- Died: 355 (aged 37–38)
- Spouse: Empress Qiang
- Issue: Fu Sheng
Names
- Fú Jiàn (苻健)
Era name and dates
- Huángshǐ (皇始): 351–355
Regnal name
- Commander in charge of military affairs in Guanzhong, Grand General, Grand Chanyu, Heavenly King of Great Qin (都督關中諸軍事 大將軍 大單于 大秦天王, 351–352); Emperor (since 352)
Posthumous name
- Emperor Jingming (景明皇帝)
Temple name
- Gaozu (高祖)
- House: Fu (Pu)
- Dynasty: Former Qin
- Father: Fu Hong

Fu Jian (Chinese: 苻健; 317–355), originally named Pu Jian (蒲健, name changed 350), courtesy name Jianye (建業), also known by his posthumous name as the Emperor Jingming of Former Qin (前秦景明帝), was the founding emperor of the Di-led Chinese Former Qin dynasty.

== During the reign of Shi Hu of Later Zhao ==
Pú Jiàn was born, as Pu Hong (蒲洪)'s third son, by Lady Jiang, in 317, while Pu Hong was a Di chieftain under Han-Zhao. However, he grew up largely during the time when Pu Hong served under Later Zhao's emperor Shi Hu. Shi Hu, while outwardly appreciative of Pu Hong's service, was deeply apprehensive of the loyalty Pu's Di soldiers had for him, and so secretly killed Pu Hong's two oldest sons. However, impressed with Pú Jiàn's bravery, archery, horsemanship, and generosity, Shi Hu favored him greatly and spared him.

In 349, as Shi Hu was gravely ill, he commissioned Pu Hong to be the governor of Yong Province (雍州, modern central and northern Shaanxi). However, it appeared that Pu Hong did not immediately proceed to his post, but was slow in preparing his Di troops for assignment while at his base at Fangtou (枋頭, in modern Hebi, Henan).

== During the collapse of Later Zhao ==
After Shi Hu died later that year, he was succeeded by his youngest son Shi Shi, but the power was actually in the hands of Shi Shi's mother Empress Dowager Liu and her ally Zhang Chai. Dissatisfied with Empress Dowager Liu and Zhang, Pu, along with several other generals, persuaded another son of Shi Hu, Shi Zun the Prince of Pengcheng to march on to the capital Yecheng, overthrowing Shi Shi. Shi Zun became emperor, but he was apprehensive of Pu Hong taking over the Guanzhong region, and therefore stripped Pu Hong of his title as governor of Yong Province. Pu Hong became angry, and immediately returned to his troops at Fangtou and sought assistance from Jin. Pú Jiàn appeared to have been with his father during this time and supportive of his ambitions.

Later in the year, Shi Zun was overthrown by his adoptive nephew Shi Min, who supported another son of Shi Hu, Shi Jian the Prince of Yiyang, as the new emperor. As the turmoil continued, the Di and Qiang whom Shi Hu had previously forced to move to eastern China began to disregard Later Zhao's laws and seek to return to their ancestral homes in the west. They supported Pu Hong as their leader. In 350, when Shi Min issued an order for the slaughter of the non-Han, but particularly the Jie and the Xiongnu, and began to show intent to take over the empire, Pu Hong was one of the generals who resisted Shi Min. Later in the year, Jin created him the Duke of Guangchuan, and created Pu Jiàn the Duke of Xiangguo. However, Pu Hong did not hold on to the Jin-created titles for long, and soon declared himself the Prince of Sanqin (i.e., the prince of the Three Qins) and the Grand Chanyu, and changed his family name from Pu to Fu, in response to a prophecy. He intended to march west to occupy the Guanzhong region; however, as he was planning, he was poisoned to death by his general Ma Qiu; on his death-bed, Fu Hong ordered Fu Jian to take over the Guanzhong region. Fu Jian, as his father's heir apparent, took over his troops and put Ma to death. He discarded the titles that his father had claimed, and again claimed the Jin-created titles.

Later that year, Fu Jian readied for a campaign west, but did not want to let the general Du Hong (杜洪), who occupied Guanzhong's main city Chang'an, know his intention, so he pretended to be ready to permanently settle at Fangtou. Once Du became relaxed, Fu marched west, dividing his army into two groups, one commanded by his brother Fu Xiong (苻雄) and himself, and one commanded by his nephew Fu Qing (苻菁) and Yu Zun (魚遵). Both armies advanced west quickly, and in winter 350, Chang'an fell to Fu Jian's forces.

In spring 351, Fu Jian's advisor Jia Xuanshuo (賈玄碩) suggested that Fu Jian claim the title the Prince of Qin and request Jin to grant him that title. Fu Jian was displeased, because he was ready to declare independence from Jin. He soon declared himself the "Heavenly King" (Tian Wang), formally breaking from Jin (and Later Zhao) and establishing Former Qin.

== Reign ==
As the ruler of Former Qin, Fu Jian appeared to be a diligent and thrifty ruler, and he abolished many of the harsh Later Zhao laws and invited able people to join his administration, but he was also violent and easily offended. For example, later in 351, he became increasingly angry that Jia had initially only suggested that he claim a princely title and not an imperial title, and he falsely accused Jia of conspiring with Jin's general Sima Xun and put Jia and his sons to death.

In 352, Fu Jian proclaimed himself Emperor. He continued to engage both former Later Zhao generals who controlled small fiefdoms and Former Yan and Jin forces, as the three states settled their borders by force in the aftermaths of Later Zhao's final destruction in 351 and the subsequent fall of Ran Min (formerly known as Shi Min) to Former Yan in 352. In 353, Fu Xiong and Fu Qing also repelled an attack by the nominal Jin vassal Former Liang.

In 354, the Jin general Huan Wen launched a major attack on Former Qin, in coordination with Former Liang forces. Fu Jian gathered all of his available forces and put them in the hands of his sons Fu Chang (苻萇) the Crown Prince, Fu Sheng the Prince of Huainan, Fu Shuo the Prince of Beiping, along with Fu Xiong and Fu Qing, ready to resist Huan. Huan, however, was able to advance all the way to Chang'an's vicinity, defeating all Former Qin resistance on the way. However, Huan hesitated at making a final siege against Chang'an, and as Fu Jian, anticipating the Jin attack, had already harvested all of the wheat, Jin forces began to run out of food supplies and was forced to withdraw in late summer 354.

The success against Huan came at a price, however, as Fu Jian's crown prince Fu Chang suffered an arrow wound in the campaign against Huan, and died in winter 354. Fu Jiàn's wife Empress Qiang wanted to create their youngest son Fu Liu (苻柳) the Prince of Jin crown prince, but Fu Jiàn, believing in a prophecy that appeared to indicate that he should create Fu Sheng crown prince, did so in 355—notwithstanding Fu Sheng's violent and capricious nature.

In summer 355, Fu Jian grew ill. During his illness, his nephew Fu Qing the Prince of Pingchang, believing that Fu Jian had already died, made a surprise attack on Fu Sheng's palace, intending to kill Fu Sheng and take over as emperor. Fu Jian, in his illness, quickly emerged and showed himself to the guards; as soon as Fu Qing's army saw Fu Jian as well, the soldiers panicked and abandoned Fu Qing. Fu Jian executed Fu Qing but no one else. He died five days later, leaving his new empire in the hands of his unstable son.

== Personal information ==
- Father
  - Fu Hong (苻洪), originally Pu Hong (蒲洪, name changed 350), self-proclaimed Prince of Sanqin, posthumously honored as Emperor Wuhui (poisoned by Ma Qiu (麻秋) 350)
- Mother
  - Lady Jiang
- Wife
  - Empress Qiang (created 351, d. 356)
- Children (note: all of Fu Jian's sons, except where as noted, who were created dukes in 351, were promoted to princes (wang) in 352 and subsequently redemoted to dukes in 357 because Fu Jian (337–385), who took the throne that year, claimed the title of "Heavenly King" (Tian Wang) rather than emperor; they will only be referred to here as dukes rather than princes to avoid repetition)
  - Fu Chang (苻萇), Crown Prince Xian'ai (created 351, d. 354)
  - Fu Jing (苻靚), the Duke of Pingyuan (created 351)
  - Fu Sheng (苻生), initially the Duke of Huainan (created 351), later the Crown Prince (created 355), later emperor
  - Fu Di (苻覿), the Duke of Changle (created 351)
  - Fu Fang (苻方), the Duke of Gaoyang (created 351). Killed in Battle of Lishan against Western Yan 385
  - Fu Shuo (苻碩), the Duke of Beiping (created 351)
  - Fu Teng (苻騰), the Duke of Huaiyang (created 351, executed 364)
  - Fu Liu (苻柳), the Duke of Jin (created 351, executed 368)
  - Fu Tong (苻桐), the Duke of Ru'nan (created 351)
  - Fu Sou (苻廋), the Duke of Wei (created 351, forced to commit suicide 368)
  - Fu Wu (苻武), the Duke of Yan (created 351, executed 368)
  - Fu You (苻幼), the Duke of Zhao (created 351, killed in battle 365)
  - Fu Dong (直立), the Duke of Klu (created 351, executed 368)

Emperor Jingming of (Former) Qin House of Fu Born: 317 Died: 355
Regnal titles
Preceded by Himself as Prince of Qin	Emperor of Former Qin; 351–355	Succeeded by Fu Sheng
Chinese royalty
Preceded by Fu Hong as Prince of Three Qins	Prince of Qin; 351	Succeeded by Himself as Emperor of Former Qin
Titles in pretence
Preceded by Shi Zhi	— TITULAR — Emperor of China; 351–355; Reason for succession failure: Sixteen Kingdoms	Succeeded by Fu Sheng
