= Fu Sheng (Former Qin) =

Fu Sheng 苻生
- Emperor of Former Qin

Emperor of Former Qin
- Reign: 10 July 355 – 357
- Predecessor: Fú Jiàn
- Successor: Fú Jiān
- Born: Pú Shēng (蒲生); 335
- Died: 357 (aged 21–22)
Names
- Fú Shēng (苻生)
Era name and dates
- Shòuguāng (壽光): 355–357
Posthumous name
- Prince Li (厲王, lit. "violent")
- House: Fu (Pu)
- Dynasty: Former Qin
- Father: Fú Jiàn

Fu Sheng (Chinese: 苻生; 335–357), originally named Pu Sheng (蒲生), courtesy name Changsheng (長生), also known by his posthumous name as the Prince Li of Yue (越厲王), was the second emperor of the Di-led Former Qin dynasty of China. He was the son of Former Qin's founding emperor Fu Jiàn (Emperor Jingming), and was a violent, arbitrary, and cruel ruler, and after ruling for only two years was overthrown by his cousin Fu Jiān (Emperor Xuanzhao) in a coup and executed, and therefore was not posthumously recognized as an emperor during the remainder of the Former Qin's rule.

== Before reign ==
Pu Sheng was born to Pu Jiàn in 335, as his third son, by his wife, the later Empress Qiang. At that time, both Pu Jiàn and his father Pu Hong (蒲洪) were generals for Later Zhao. Pu Sheng was born blind in one eye (though some accounts said that he lost his eye to an eagle while trying to get eagles' eggs). Once, his grandfather Pu Hong teased him, "I heard that you, my blind boy, only shed tears from one eye; is that true?" Pu Sheng, in anger, stabbed his blind eye and exclaimed, "This is the other eye shedding tears!" Pu Hong, shocked at his reaction, whipped him and told him, "You are only deserving to be a slave!" Pu Sheng responded, "That is fine; I'll just be like Shi Le [a slave who became founding emperor of Later Zhao]." Pu Hong became concerned at his behavior, which was also manifested by lack of discipline, and told Pu Jiàn that he should consider killing his son, lest his family be destroyed by him. Pu Jiàn considered it, but was dissuaded from it by his brother Pu Xiong (蒲雄) who told him that, "We should give this boy some time to grow and be mature." As Pu Sheng matured, he became known for his strength and ferocity in battle, as he was strong enough to battle wild beasts, and was skillful in horsemanship and use of weapons. After his father (who had by then changed the family name from Pu to Fu) established Former Qin in 351, he was created the Prince of Huainan.

In 354, when Jin's general Huan Wen launched a major attack against Former Qin, nearly destroying it, Fu Sheng was one of the generals whom Fu Jiàn commissioned to lead the army against Huan. Fu Sheng was personally successful in battles, single-handedly slaying tens of Jin's officers and soldiers and cutting down many enemy flags, but was not particularly successful as a commanding general. Eventually, Huan was forced to withdraw when his food supplies ran out, but Fu Sheng's older brother Fu Chang (苻萇) the Crown Prince, suffered an arrow wound during the campaign, and died in winter 354. Initially, his mother Empress Qiang wanted to create his younger brother, Fu Liu (苻柳) the Prince of Jin, crown prince, but Fu Jiàn, reading a prophecy that contained the phrase "three goats shall have five eyes," believed that the prophecy indicated that Fu Sheng should succeed him (because one of his eyes was blind), and therefore created Fu Sheng crown prince. After a failed coup by his cousin Fu Qing (苻菁) the Prince of Pingchang to take over in 355, Fu Sheng succeeded to the throne when his father died thereafter. He honored his mother Empress Qiang as empress dowager, and created his wife Princess Liang empress.

== Reign ==
Fu Sheng almost immediately displayed his violent and cruel nature, however. Fu Jiàn's will commissioned a number of high-level officials to serve as Fu Sheng's assistants, but all of them (with the possible exception of his granduncle Fu An (苻安) the Prince of Wudu, who might or might not have been named in the will) perished rather quickly under his violent rule:

- Yu Zun (魚遵): executed in 357 along with his sons and grandsons after Fu Sheng dreamed of a large fish (yu (魚) in Chinese) eating calamus (pu (蒲) in Chinese),
- Lei Ruo'er (雷弱兒): executed in 355 along with his sons and grandsons after false accusations by Fu Sheng's associates Zhao Shao (趙韶) and Dong Rong (董榮),
- Mao Gui (毛貴), uncle of Fu Sheng's wife Empress Liang: executed in 355 along with Empress Liang, Liang An, and Liang Leng after astrologers prophesied that there would be a great funeral and high-level officials would be killed,
- Wang Duo (王墮): executed in 356 after offending Dong, who then advised Fu Jiàn that a high-level official needed to be executed in accordance with astrological signs,
- Liang Leng (梁楞): executed in 355, along with Empress Liang, Mao Gui, and Liang An,
- Liang An (梁安): executed in 355, along with Empress Liang, Mao Gui, and Liang Leng,
- Duan Chun (段純): executed in 355, the same day that Fu Jiàn became emperor, after Fu Sheng was offended at his suggestion that changing the era name in the middle of a year was improper,
- and Xin Lao (辛牢): killed in 356 by an arrow Fu Sheng launched during the middle of a feast after Fu Sheng became displeased that he, as the master of ceremony, was not getting everyone drunk.

Because Fu Sheng was blind in one eye and apparently apprehensive that people would be making fun at him or be contemptuous of him due to that disability, he ordered that words such as "missing," "lacking," "slanted," "less," and "without" to never be used. He was also engaged in heavy drinking, and he often either ignored officials' petitions altogether or made irrational decisions on them in the middle of his stupor, allowing his attendants to make random decisions on his behalf. He also carried out cruel punishment—in addition to frequent executions, he also liked to cruelly treat animals—including throwing them into boiling water or skinning them alive, which he sometimes applied to humans. In 356, when his uncle Qiang Ping (強平), Empress Dowager Qiang's brother, tried to correct his ways, he broke Qiang Ping's skull by hammering his skull, and then executed him, leading Empress Dowager Qiang to die in sorrow and fear.

Also in 356, Fu Sheng's brother Fu Liu the Prince of Jin was able to persuade the Former Liang regent Zhang Guan to have the young Former Liang ruler Zhang Xuanjing become a vassal.

In 357, the former Jin general Yao Xiang, who, after rebelling against Jin in 354, had intended to establish his independent state, attacked former Qin's northern territory, and the former Qin generals Deng Qiang and Fu Huangmei (苻黃眉) the Prince of Guangping fought back and captured and executed him. Fu Sheng, still respectful of Yao Xiang and his father Yao Yizhong, whose casket Yao had carried with his army, buried both with honors. However, he not only did not reward Fu Huangmei but further insulted him, leading Fu Huangmei to plot an unsuccessful assassination attempt against him, resulting in Fu Huangmei's death.

Later in 357, Fu Sheng became suspicious of his cousins Fu Jiān the Prince of Donghai and Fu Fa (苻法) the Prince of Qinghe and considered killing them. His ladies in waiting leaked the news to Fu Jiān, who immediately led his private army to attack the palace. The imperial guards, who had already resented Fu Sheng's ferocity, defected to Fu Jiān. Fu Jiān captured Fu Sheng, who was still in a drunken stupor, and had him deposed, demoted to Prince of Yue and then executed by being dragged by a horse. Fu Jiān then took the throne.

== Era name ==
- Shouguang (壽光 shòu guāng) 355–357

== Personal information ==
- Father
  - Fu Jiàn (Emperor Jingming)
- Mother
  - Empress Qiang
- Wife
  - Empress Liang (created and executed 355)
- Son
  - Fu Kui (苻馗), Hereditary Prince of Yue

King Li of (Former) Qin House of Fu Born: 335 Died: 357
Regnal titles
Preceded by Fu Jiàn	Emperor of Former Qin; 355–357	Succeeded by Fu Jiān
Titles in pretence
Preceded by Fu Jiàn	— TITULAR — Emperor of China; 355–357; Reason for succession failure: Sixteen Kingdoms	Succeeded by Fu Jiān
