= Fu Hong =

Fu Hong 苻洪
- Emperor of Former Qin (posthumously)

ruler of Former Qin
- Reign: 350
- Successor: Fu Jian
- Born: Pú Hóng (蒲洪); 317
- Died: 355 (aged 37–38)
Names
- Fú Hóng (苻洪)
Regnal name
- Grand General, Grand Chanyu, Prince of Three Qins (大將軍 大單于 三秦王)
Posthumous name
- Emperor Huiwu (惠武皇帝)
Temple name
- Taizu (太祖)
- Father: Pu Huaigui

Fu Hong (Chinese: 苻洪, 284–350), originally named Pu Hong (Chinese: 蒲洪), courtesy name Guangshi (Chinese: 廣世), was the father of founding emperor of the Former Qin dynasty, Fu Jiàn (Emperor Jingming). In 350, Fu Hong proclaimed himself the Prince of Three Qins (Chinese: 三秦王), receiving a prophecy willed him to become King (Chinese: 艸付應王). In the same year, he was poisoned by his subordinate Ma Qiu, who was then executed by Fu Jiàn, who took over Fu Hong's army. He was posthumously honored as the Emperor Huiwu of (Former) Qin (Chinese: (前)秦惠武帝) with the temple name Taizu (太祖).

Prince of Three Qins House of Fu Born: 317 Died: 355
Chinese royalty
New creation	Prince of Three Qins; 350	Succeeded by Fu Jiàn as Prince of Qin
