= Empress Dowager Gou =

Empress Dowager Gou (Chinese: 苟太后; personal name unknown) was an empress dowager of China's Former Qin dynasty.
