= Yu Liang's Northern Expedition =

Aborted campaign by Yu Liang against the Later Zhao (339)

- Part of the Eastern Jin and Sixteen Kingdoms period
Date	September – October 339
Location	Anhui and Hubei
Result	Inconclusive; Zhao retreats

Belligerents
Later Zhao	Eastern Jin

Commanders and leaders
Shi Hu; Kui An; Shi Min; Li Nong; Zhang Hedu; Li Tu	Yu Liang; Mao Bao †; Fan Jun †; Yu Yi; Li Yang

Strength
70,000	Unknown

Casualties and losses
5,000+	6,000+

Yu Liang's Northern Expedition was an aborted campaign by the Eastern Jin commander, Yu Liang against the state of Later Zhao in 339 during the Jin dynasty (266–420) and Sixteen Kingdoms period. While in the midst of preparing for the expedition, the Heavenly King of Zhao, Shi Hu ordered his generals to carry out a pre-emptive attack on the Jin. The campaign ended in a stalemate, but the losses sustained by the Jin forced Yu Liang to call off the expedition.

== Background ==
Yu Liang was a top-ranking official and the brother-in-law of Emperor Ming of Jin through his sister, Empress Yu Wenjun. When Ming neared death in 325, Yu Liang was among the few he entrusted a regent to his son, Emperor Cheng, who was only three years old at the time. Yu Liang dominated the imperial court in the first two years under Emperor Cheng, but his mishandling of power led to the devastating rebellion of Su Jun from 327 to 329. The rebellion tainted his reputation, and after it was put down, he was willingly transferred from the capital, Jiankang to a border post; first to Wuhu in Yang province, then to Wuchang in Jiang province.

Though Yu Liang remained influential even when away from Jiankang, power within the Jin government was essentially split between him, the minister Wang Dao and the border commander, Xi Jian. He was determined to restore the political power he once had, and in 338, he conspired with Xi Jian to raise troops against Wang Dao. However, Xi Jian refused to join and the plot was leaked to Wang Dao. After his Army Advisor, Sun Sheng dissuaded him, Yu Liang abandoned the idea and the matter quietly went away.

== Prelude ==
Yu Liang then considered his next plan, that is to launch a northern expedition and elevate his prestige through military success. In March or April 339, he petitioned the court to issue a series of appointments;

- Huan Xuan, (Note: not to be confused with the Huan Chu emperor with a similar-sounding name. In the Tang-era Book of Jin, this Huan Xuan's biography is found in the same volume (vol.81) as his kinsman Huan Yi.) as Chief Controller north of the Mian river and Inspector of Si province, with his city of Xiangyang as his base.
- Yu Yì (庾懌), his younger brother, as Chief Controller of Liang and Yong provinces and Inspector of Liang province, to be transferred to Weixing (魏興; southeast of present-day Suqian, Jiangsu);
- Yu Yi (庾翼; note the different given name), his other younger brother, as Colonel of Southern Man and acting Administrator of Nan commandary, to be transferred to Jiangling;
- Mao Bao, as Chief Controller Yang province west of the Yangzi and Inspector of Yu province, along with the Administrator of Xiyang, Fan Jun (樊峻), to be transferred to Zhucheng (邾城, in modern Huanggang, Hubei) with 10,000 elite soldiers;
- Tao Cheng (陶稱), as General of the Household Gentlemen of the South and Chancellor of Jiangxia, to march to the central Mian river.

Tao Cheng was the son of Tao Kan, a prominent leader in Jing province who Yu Liang had a complicated relationship with but had died in 334. Yu Liang had a grudge with Tao Cheng as he was the one who previously leaked the plot with Xi Jian to Wang Dao. When Tao Cheng visited him at Xiakou, Yu Liang had him arrested and executed for a list of past crimes. Yu Liang also realized that Weixing was too remote and dangerous, so he had Yu Yì camp at Banzhou (半洲; west of present-day Jiujiang, Jiangxi) instead.

In April or May, Yu Liang's Army Advisor, Li Song (李閎) attacked the state of Cheng-Han in the west at Ba and Jianyang commanderies, capturing two of their administrators. That same month, Yu Liang submitted a petition to the court, requesting them to gather a hundred thousand soldiers at Shicheng (石城; in present-day Zhongxiang, Hubei) and position the armies along the Yangzi and Mian rivers to launch a northern campaign against the Later Zhao state. When Emperor Cheng consulted his court, Wang Dao supported the proposal, but Xi Jian and the Minister of Ceremonies, Cai Mo opposed it. Cai Mo's argument in particular convinced the court to order Yu Liang not to move his troops.

== The campaign ==
=== Fall of Zhucheng ===
As Mao Bao and Fan Jun moved to Zhucheng, the Heavenly King of Zhao, Shi Hu took notice and knew that an invasion was imminent. He assigned Kui An as the Grand Commander to lead Shi Jian, Shi Min, Li Nong, Zhang Hedu and Li Tu (李菟) among others to carry out a preemptive attack on Jin. They were to bring 50,000 infantry to invade the borders of Jing and Yang provinces and 20,000 cavalry to assault Zhucheng. Mao Bao requested for aid from Yu Liang, who was camped at Wuchang, but Yu Liang felt that the city was strong to hold long enough, so he delayed in sending reinforcements.

In September or October, Zhao forces under Shi Min defeated Jin forces south of the Mian River, killing their general, Cai Huai (蔡懷). Kui An and Li Nong captured several locations south of the Mian, while Zhu Bao (朱保) routed the Jin forces at Baishi (白石; southwest of present-day Hanshan County, Anhui) and killed Zheng Bao (鄭豹) and four other generals. Zhang Hedu's detachment attacked Zhucheng and captured it; around 6,000 Jin soldiers perished in the battle, and while Mao Bao and Fan Jun managed to break out of the encirclement, they drowned in the Yangzi river during their flight.

=== Defence of Shicheng ===
Kui An proceeded to capture Huting (胡亭; northwest of present-day Fuyang, Anhui) and invade Jiangxia. The Administrator of Yiyang, Zheng Jin and a local general, Zheng Chong both surrendered to the invading Zhao forces. Kui An then advanced to lay siege onto Shicheng, which was defended by the Administrator of Jingling, Li Yang (李陽). When Yu Yi heard that the Zhao army was approaching Shicheng, he sent his soldiers from Jiangling to ambush them and secretly kept the city supplied as the laid siege. Li Yang also held fast to his defences and fought back relentlessly.

In the end, Kui An was defeated and more than 5,000 of soldiers were killed. He retreated, and as he marched east along the Mian River, his soldiers sacked and pillaged the surrounding counties and commanderies. He captured over 7,000 household on his way back north and had them relocated to the provinces of You and Ji.

== Aftermath ==
While the Zhao invasion was happening, Yu Liang was drafting a memorial for the court asking to be transferred to Shicheng. When he learnt of Zhucheng's fall, however, he instead sent a memorial of apology and offered to demote himself, which the court accepted but allowed him to keep his current office. The Book of Jin claims that the defeat made Yu Liang "ill from grief", and he soon died on 14 February 340.

Yu Yi inherited his military positions, while his other brother, Yu Bing handled affairs within the court. Yu Yi would carry out his own northern expedition from 343 to 344, but the untimely deaths of his nephews, Emperor Cheng and Emperor Kang, Yu Bing and finally him meant that he was unable to achieve much from the campaign. After he died in 345, his court rival, He Chong took the chance to strip the Yu clan of their military command and replaced Yu Yi with his subordinate, Huan Wen.

== Sources ==
- Book of Jin
- Zizhi Tongjian
- Lü, Simian (1948), A History of Jin, Northern and Southern Dynasties 两晋南北朝史, vol. 1, Shanghai: Kaiming Press
