= Yu Bing (Eastern Jin) =

Jin dynasty minister and consort kin (296-344)

- 庾冰

Chief of the Palace Secretariat (中書監)
- In office 339 – 344
- Monarch: Emperor Cheng of Jin/Emperor Kang of Jin/Emperor Mu of Jin

Inspector of Yangzhou (揚州刺史)
- In office 330 – 343
- Monarch: Emperor Cheng of Jin/Emperor Kang of Jin/Emperor Mu of Jin

Personal details
- Born: 296
- Died: 344
- Children: Yu Xi (庾希); Yu Xí (庾袭); Yu You; Yu Yun (Note: Yu Yun's grandsons Yu Dengzhi and Yu Bingzhi have biographies in vol.53 of Book of Song. Their third cousins include Yu Yue (great-grandson of Yu Liang), who has a biography in vol.52 of the same work, and Pei Songzhi (whose mother was a granddaughter of Yu Liang).); Yu Qian (庾倩) (Note: The character "倩" has two pronunciations: "qiàn" and "qìng".); Yu Miao; Yu Rou; Yu Daolian
- Parent: Yu Chen (father)
- Occupation: Politician
- Courtesy name: Jijian (季堅)
- Posthumous name: Zhongcheng (忠成)

Yu Bing (296 (Note: According to Yu Bing's biography in Book of Jin, he was 49 (by East Asian reckoning) when he died. Thus by calculation, his birth year should be 296.) – 29 December 344 (Note: According to Emperor Kang's biography in Book of Jin, Yu Bing died on the gengchen day of the 11th month of the 2nd year of the Jianyuan era. This corresponds to 29 Dec 344 in the Julian calendar.)), courtesy name Jijian, was a Chinese consort kin and politician. He served as a minister of the Eastern Jin dynasty. He was a part of the prestigious Yu clan of Yingchuan as the younger brother of Yu Liang and elder brother of Emperor Ming of Jin's empress, Yu Wenjun. After Yu Liang died in February 340, Yu Bing and another brother of his, Yu Yi inherited Liang's influence in the court. During the succession issues of 342 and 344, Yu Bing pushed for his nephews to inherit the throne to retain his clan's power, in contrast to his court rival and brother-in-law He Chong, (Note: He Chong's biography in Book of Jin recorded that his wife was a younger sister of Yu Wenjun.) who supported the dying emperors' sons to succeed instead.

== Life ==
Yu Bing was a prodigy and highly looked upon since a young age. He once received an appointment from the Minister over the Masses but turned it down, and instead became an Assistant in the Palace Library. In 311, he assisted in putting down the rebellion of the Inspector of Yangzhou, Hua Yi, and for that, he became Marquis of Dunxiang. Wang Dao later promoted him to Minister of Education and Chief Clerk of the Right to the Minister Over The Masses.

=== Su Jun's rebellion ===
In 327, war was about to break out between Bing's brother, Yu Liang and the warlord Su Jun. Yu Liang made Bing his Interior Minister of Wu to prepare against Su Jun. Shortly after the war began in c.December, Yu Liang and his brothers Yu Shuyu, Yu Tiao and Yu Yi were driven out of Jiankang by Su Jun's forces in 328. Su then turned to Wu Commandery where Yu Bing was situated. Yu Bing retreated and fled to Kuaiji, so Su Jun placed a bounty on his head. An attendant soldier of Bing's offered him an escape through his boat, covering him under bamboo mats. Along the way to Kuaiji, Bing and the soldier would chant and sing with each other. Whenever they reached a checkpoint, they acted wildly, shouting, "Who's looking for Yu Bing? I got him right here!" The guards at these checkpoints all thought they were simply drunk men, and allowed them to pass. Eventually, Yu Bing safely arrived at Kuaiji.

When a loyalist coalition was created against Su Jun in 328, the Interior Minister of Kuaiji, Wang Shu, made Yu Bing General Who Asserts Valour and ordered him to lead troops to Zhejiang. Meanwhile, Su Jun's minister, Cai Mo, surrendered to Yu Bing and gave back Bing his office of Interior Minister of Wu. Together with Yu Tan (虞潭), Bing fought against Su's general Zhang Jian (張健) and later, during the final push to capture Shitou, Yu Bing sent Sima Tenghan (司馬滕含) to assist the coalition. After the rebellion dissipated in 329, Yu Bing was offered the title of Marquis of Xinwu, but Yu Bing rejected it. Instead, he became General Who Spread Might and Interior Minister of Kuaiji.

=== After Wang Dao's death ===
After Wang Dao died in 339, Yu Bing took his place as Chief of the Palace Secretariat, Inspector of Yangzhou, and advisor of affairs of the Masters of Writing. Bing was dedicated to his offices. He respected the old ministers and recruited talented newcomers into the administration, so he was seen by many as virtuous. However, unlike Wang Dao, he was stricter on the officials, which attracted some criticism from people such as Yin Rong (殷融) and Fan Wang (范汪). During this time, he rectified the household rolls by registering more than 10,000 unlisted people and increased the military figures. Yu Bing enjoyed investigating into every matter with extreme thoroughness but became more lenient as time goes by. However, his leniency became too excessive to the point that many did not take his laws seriously. Yu Liang died in 340 and his positions were given to his younger brother Yu Yi. Together with Yi, Bing filled in his late brother's role and maintained their family's prominence in the court.

In 341, the Inspector of Yan, Murong Huang demanded the court to bestow him with the titles of Grand General and Prince of Yan. There was great debate surrounding this, as while Huang was one of the last of Jin's loyalists in the north, Huang was not a part of the imperial family. The debate went on for a year. Meanwhile, Huang sent a memorial to the court accusing the Yu brothers of monopolizing power and calling for their removal. He also wrote a personal letter to Yu Bing faulting him of inefficiently running the state despite holding high positions. Bing was afraid that if Huang rebels, the court will blame him for it. Because of this, Yu Bing and He Chong sent a joint memorial in support of Huang, and Huang was granted his titles.

=== Succession issues ===
Emperor Cheng of Jin grew ill in 342. False edicts were published, forbidding any ministers from entering the palace. However, Yu Bing suspected something was amiss and upon further investigation, the edicts were proven to be forged. The emperor's children, Sima Pi and Sima Yi were both still young and not fit to rule. Yu Bing and Yu Yi's sister, Yu Wenjun was the mother of Emperor Cheng, and for this reason the brothers were able to have a strong presence in the state. They feared that if either one of Cheng's sons were to ascend, their ties to the throne will become more distant which in turn will diminish their influence. Thus, they proposed that another nephew of theirs, Sima Yue, be made to succeed his brother to the throne. This was met with remonstration from He Chong, who believed that the emperor's son should succeed, but Yu Bing ignored him.

Yu Bing was among the few to receive Emperor Cheng's final testament. After his death, Sima Yue ascended the throne and became Emperor Kang. While the new emperor mourned, Yu Bing and He Chong took care of government affairs for him. In 343, Yu Bing supported Yu Yi's decision to launch a joint attack with Former Liang and Murong Huang against Later Zhao, although he was in the minority that advocated for this. However, not long after, when the Zhao administrator, Dai Kai (戴開), defected to Jin, Yu Yi used this as a pretext to stage his northern expedition against Zhao. In order to help Yu Yi, Yu Bing requested to be moved to border command, so the court place him in command of Jingzhou, Jiangzhou, Ningzhou, Yizhou, Lianzhou, Jiaozhou, Guangzhou and four commanderies of Yuzhou. Yu Bing then moved out of the capital to camp at Wuchang.

In November 344, while Yu Yi's campaign was still going on, Emperor Kang became deathly ill. In similar fashion, the emperor's eldest son, Sima Dan, was only a child. Yu Bing and Yu Yi were once again pushing for a brother to succeed him, this time being Sima Yu. (Note: This is despite the fact that Sima Yu's mother was not Yu Wenjun. Also, by this point, Sima Yu was already in his early 20s and would not be as pliable as Emperors Cheng and Kang were when they ascended the throne.) However, He Chong successfully convinced the dying emperor to go with Sima Dan, much to the anger of the Yu brothers. Sima Dan ascended the throne as Emperor Mu of Jin with Empress Dowager Chu acting on his behalf.

Just one month later, Yu Bing would fall sick as well. Empress Dowager Chu tried to summon him to help her in the government, but Bing could not respond. He eventually succumbed and died on December 29, 344. He was posthumously named Zhongchang and posthumously appointed Palace Attendant and Minister of Works. His daughter, Yu Daolian became the empress to Emperor Fei of Jin in 365.
