= Sima Yang =

Prince of Xiyang (284-329)

- 司馬羕

Personal details
- Born: 284
- Died: 29 March 329 (aged 45)
- Parent: Sima Liang (father)

Prince of Xiyang (西阳王)
- Tenure: 28 September 291 – c.November 326

Prince of Yiyang County (弋阳县王)
- Tenure: c.November 326 – 29 March 329 (Note: While Emperor Cheng's annals in Book of Jin referred to Sima Yang as Prince of Yiyang County when recording his death, vol.94 of Zizhi Tongjian referred to him as Prince of Xiyang when recording his death.)
Posthumous name
- None
- House: Jin dynasty

Sima Yang (Chinese: 司馬羕; 284 – 29 March 329), courtesy name Yannian (延年), was an imperial prince of the Jin dynasty. A son of Sima Liang, Prince Wencheng of Runan, and grandson of Sima Yi, Yang was known for being one of the few princes of the Sima clan who went south to Jiankang in the aftermath of the Disaster of Yongjia, as well as a supporter of Su Jun during the latter's rebellion against the Eastern Jin. After the rebellion's failure, he was either forced to commit suicide or executed.

== Background and life during the Western Jin era ==
Sima Yang was born in 284 during the reign of his cousin Emperor Wu of Jin; he was also born late in Liang's life. (Note: Sima Liang was born before 227, which meant that he was at least 58 years old when Yang was born.) During the later part of the Tai'kang era (c.285 - 289), he was made Duke of Xiyang County. In May 290, Emperor Wu died. With his death, Sima Liang became embroiled in court politics as Emperor Wu's successor and son Emperor Hui was developmentally disabled. In May 291, after the ouster and killing of Emperor Hui's first regent Yang Jun in April, Sima Liang was made co-regent with Wei Guan. Just a few months later in July, Sima Liang and Wei Guan were killed by Sima Wei; Sima Yang's elder brother Sima Ju (司馬矩) was also killed. Then aged seven, Sima Yang managed to escape with assistance from Sima Liang's in-law Pei Kai and Pei Kai's father-in-law Wang Hun. (Note: According to Pei Kai's biography in Book of Jin, Pei Kai's son Pei Zan married a daughter of Yang Jun. Thus, when Yang Jun was deposed and killed in Apr 291, Kai was imprisoned due to his marital ties with Yang; Zan was killed during the coup itself. Even though he was about to be executed, Kai did not panic and indeed asked for a brush and paper to correspond with relatives as if nothing unusual had happened. Fortunately, Fu Zhi managed to save Kai and Kai was only relieved of his positions. Kai's eldest son Pei Yu married a daughter of Sima Liang, and a daughter of Kai married a son of Wei Guan. Kai himself died later that year at the age of 55 (by East Asian reckoning); the year ends on 4 Feb 292 in the Julian calendar.) The day after Liang's and Wei's deaths, Sima Wei was killed after Emperor Hui's empress Jia Nanfeng plotted against him. On 28 September 291, Yang was made a prince; he was also later appointed to various military posts. During the War of the Eight Princes, he was once reduced to the status of a commoner on accusations that he was part of Sima Ai's (Prince of Changsha) clique, but was later restored to his princely status after Emperor Hui's return to Luoyang in June 306; Emperor Hui later died in January 307. During the Yongjia era (307–312) of the reign of Emperor Hui's successor and half-brother Emperor Huai, Yang's fiefdom eventually grew to 35000 households. However, with the growing chaos in Northern China, he eventually had to abandon his fiefdom and follow Sima Yue, the Prince of Donghai and Emperor Huai's regent. With Sima Yue's death in April 311 and the Disaster of Yongjia in July, Sima Yang fled south to join Sima Rui, the Prince of Langya (and future Emperor Yuan of Jin), together with his younger brother Sima Zong (司馬宗) the Prince of Nandun. (Note: During his time in the north, Sima Yang invited Yu Shuyu, who was then still a teenager, to serve under him; Yu refused the invitation.)

== Life under Emperors Yuan and Ming ==
Sima Rui took the title "King of Jin"—a title previously used by Sima Zhao and Emperor Wu while they were regents of Cao Wei—rather than emperor on 6 April 317. He created his son Sima Shao crown prince on 1 May of the same year. Under Sima Rui as King of Jin, Sima Yang was allowed to appoint his own officials. He also had a private army of about 1000 soldiers, and 100 cavalrymen. Together with Sima Zong, Yang was ordered to settle refugees to populate Zhongzhou (中州) and the remote areas of Jiangxi. On 7 February 318, Liu Cong, the emperor of Han-Zhao, executed Emperor Min. About two and a half months later, on 23 April, news of Emperor Min's execution reached Jiankang. Sima Rui then declared himself emperor three days later. (Note: According to Emperor Yuan's biography in Book of Jin, Sima Yang led the other officials in persuading Emperor Yuan to take up the imperial title.)

In January 323, Emperor Yuan died and was succeeded by his son Emperor Ming. After Wang Dun, who had the upper hand in his struggle against Emperor Yuan, died in August 324 and his rebellion subsequently quelled, Sima Yang was made Grand Commandant in c.November.

In early October 325, Emperor Ming became gravely ill. During this final illness, Sima Zong and Yu Yin (younger brother of Lady Yu Mengmu (Note: Emperor Yuan's wife, posthumously honoured as "Empress Yuanjing".)) held the keys to the palace where Emperor Ming was resting. One night, Yu Liang decided to seek an audience with the emperor; he then went to Sima Zong and asked for the keys to the palace gates. Sima refused, incurring Yu's wrath. At a later date, Yu pushed open the door to Emperor Ming's chambers. In tears, Yu claimed that Sima Yang and Sima Zong were plotting to dismiss court officials. Yu then requested that the emperor make him regent and dismiss Sima Zong, Sima Yang and Yu Yin; Emperor Ming refused. On 12 October, a number of high-level officials, including Sima Yang (who was then taizai), Yu Liang, Wang Dao, Bian Kun (卞壼), Xi Jian, Lu Ye (陸瞱; grandson of Lu Mao), and Wen Jiao formed the regency council.

== Involvement with Su Jun and death ==
Emperor Ming died on 18 October 325 and was succeeded by his young son Emperor Cheng. With his death, his empress Yu Wenjun's elder brother Yu Liang began to increase his power. As Empress Dowager Yu became regent on 2 November, Yu Liang became effectively the most powerful official in the administration. He changed from the lenient policies of Wang (who was prime minister during Emperor Ming's reign) to stricter applications of laws and regulations, which offended the officials accustomed to Wang's lenience. Further, he became apprehensive of the generals Tao Kan and Zu Yue – neither of whom was mentioned in the list of honors and promotions announced by Emperor Ming's will and believed that Yu had erased their names from the will – and Su Jun, who had allowed many criminals to join his army. On 20 November 326, Sima Yang's nephew Sima You (司馬祐) the Prince of Ru'nan died. Later that month or in early December, Yu Liang alienated public opinion (Note: Sima Zong and Sima Yang were cousins of Sima Jin (Emperor Yuan's father) and were thus regarded as elders of the clan, despite their relatively young age.) by falsely accusing Sima Yang's brother Sima Zong of treason and killing him, and demoting Sima Yang to Prince of Yiyang County (弋阳县王).

In c.December 327, Su Jun and Zu Yue declared their rebellion. Su quickly arrived at the capital Jiankang in early March 328 and captured it. Yu Liang and his brothers Yu Shuyu, Yu Tiao and Yu Yi were forced to flee. Meanwhile, Su granted himself and Zu various titles on 5 March and allowed his troops to pillage the capital. On the same day, Su Jun issued a general pardon, but said pardon did not include Yu Liang and his brothers; Sima Yang was restored to his previous title of Prince of Xiyang after he praised Su.

However, Su Jun was killed in November 328, and his rebellion began to falter. In March 329, imperial forces recaptured the capital, and Sima Yang met his end; his sons Sima Bo (司馬播) and Sima Chong (司馬充) and grandson Sima Song (司馬崧) were also killed. (Note: Per vols.6 and 38 of Jin Shu, Sima Yang's son Sima Kui (司马悝), who was made Sima Rong's heir and Prince of Liang, predeceased his father on 20 Aug 317 (dingwei day of the 7th month of the 1st year of the Jianwu era). As Sima Yang himself was then about 33 years old, Sima Kui was likely a child or young teenager when he died.)
