= He Chong (Jin dynasty) =

Jin dynasty minister (292-346)

- 何充

Manager of the Affairs of the Masters of Writing (錄尚書事)
- In office 339 – 346
- Monarch: Emperor Cheng of Jin/Emperor Kang of Jin/Emperor Mu of Jin

Inspector of Yangzhou (揚州刺史)
- In office 343 – 346
- Monarch: Emperor Mu of Jin

Personal details
- Born: 292
- Died: 346
- Relations: He Zhun (brother)
- Parent: He Rui (father)
- Courtesy name: Cidao (次道)
- Peerage: Marquis of Dunxiang (都亭侯)
- Posthumous name: Duke of Wenmu (文穆公)

He Chong (292 – 21 February 346), courtesy name Cidao, was a Chinese minister of the Eastern Jin dynasty. After the death of Prime Minister Wang Dao in September 339, He Chong became one of Emperor Cheng of Jin's most influential advisors. He Chong feuded with the imperial uncles (and his brothers-in-law), Yu Bing and Yu Yi over the successions of Emperor Cheng and Emperor Kang, as He Chong backed the emperors' respective sons to take the throne while the Yu brothers supported their nephews. In 345, following the deaths of the Yu brothers, He Chong played an instrumental role in Huan Wen's rise to power when he recommended him to succeed Yu Yi's position of Inspector of Jingzhou.

== Life ==
=== Early life and career ===
He Chong hailed from Qian County (灊縣; northeast of present-day Huoshan County, Anhui) in Lujiang Commandery (廬江郡; around present-day Lu'an, Anhui) and was renowned for his writings and virtue. He first served as a secretary of Sima Rui's commander, Wang Dun. Wang Dun had a brother named Wang Han (王含), the Prefect of Lujiang. Wang Han was notoriously corrupt, but Wang Dun once praised him in front of his officials. He said, "My brother is an excellent official in his commandery. The people of Lujiang adore him." Hearing his statement, He Chong openly and sternly replied, "I am from Lujiang myself, and what I've heard is different." Wang Dun could not respond to this but was resentful towards He Chong and had him demoted. After Wang Dun died in August 324, He Chong became an Imperial Secretariat.

He Chong had strong ties in the Jin administration. His mother was an elder sister of Cao Shu (曹淑), the wife of the prominent minister Wang Dao while his wife was the younger sister of Emperor Ming's empress, Yu Wenjun, and brother-in-law, Yu Liang. Because he was on good terms with Wang Dao and Emperor Ming, he managed to secure a high-ranking position early in his career. After Emperor Cheng ascended the throne in 325, He Chong became an Attendant Gentleman of the Yellow Gate. He sided with the loyalist coalition during Su Jun's rebellion between 328 and 329. For helping in the fight against Su Jun, he became Marquis of Dunxiang and a Cavalier In Regular Attendance.

He Chong successively serves as Prefect of Dongyang, General Who Establishes Might and Prefect of Kuaiji. In Kuaiji, He Chong became noted for his virtuous administration and recommendation of talents such as Xie Feng (謝奉) and Wei Yi (魏顗). Both Wang Dao and Yu Liang were impressed with his performance, so the two urged Emperor Cheng to promote him. He Chong rose to Minister of Personnel and Champion General, holding command of the army in Kuaiji. Before Wang Dao died in 339, he told Emperor Cheng to use He Chong as his advisor. After Wang Dao's death, the Emperor made He Chong the General Who Protects The Army and Manager of the Affairs of the Masters of Writing.

=== Succession of Emperor Cheng and Emperor Kang ===
Emperor Cheng was deathly ill in 342, and there were debates over who should succeed him. His sons, Sima Pi and Sima Yi were both still infants. After Yu Liang's death in February 340, his younger brothers Yu Yi and Yu Bing held considerable influence within the state as uncles of Emperor Cheng. They worry that if one of Cheng's sons succeeds him, their ties to the throne become distant, allowing another family with closer blood ties to the emperor to take their place. Yu Bing advocated for his nephew and Emperor Cheng's brother, Sima Yue, to succeed him, but He Chong opposed this. He remonstrated to Yu Bing that the role of the emperor should be passed down to the emperor's son if possible, but Yu Bing ignored him.

Sima Yue ascended the throne and became later known as Emperor Kang of Jin, with He Chong and Yu Bing serving as his advisors. After his ascension, Emperor Kang thanked He Chong for allowing him to take the throne, but He Chong told him, "Your Majesty could only soar like a dragon thanks to Yu Bing. If I had been listened to, you would never have reached such heights." Emperor Kang felt ashamed because of this. Emperor Kang later made Chong General of Agile Cavalry, Chief Controller of Xuzhou and Jinling in Yangzhou, and Inspector of Xuzhou. Chong moved himself to Jingkou to avoid confrontation with the Yu brothers.

In 343, Yu Yi held a northern expedition against Jin's rival state, Later Zhao. Yu Bing requested the court to relocate him to Wuchang so that he could support his brother, which they permitted. However, after Yu Bing left the capital, the court summoned He Chong back and appointed him Chief Controller of Yangzhou, Yuzhou and Langya in Xuzhou. They also assigned him acting Inspector of Yangzhou, Chief of the Palace Secretariat and Manager of the Affairs of the Masters of Writing.

A familiar scene arose in 344 as Emperor Kang grew ill. Yu Yi and Yu Bing suggested that the Prince of Kuaji and their nephew, Sima Yu take the throne, as the emperor's son, Sima Dan, was still a child. However, He Chong approached Emperor Kang and successfully persuaded him to make Sima Dan his heir. Emperor Kang died shortly after, and Sima Dan ascended the throne, later known as Emperor Mu. Because of this, the Yu brothers hated He Chong. After the emperor's ascension, He Chong kept his role as Chief of the Palace Secretariat and Manager of the Affairs of the Masters of Writing. However, He Chong placed more importance on the latter position, so he voluntarily relinquished the former and became a Palace Attendant.

=== Elevating Chu Pou and Huan Wen ===
He Chong believed that Chu Pou, father of the Empress Dowager, Chu Suanzi, should hold more prominent offices in the capital. He Chong started a petition to relieve Chu Pou from border command and have Chu Pou serve as his assistant. The court appointed Chu Pou as Palace Attendant, Guard General and Manager of the Affairs of the Masters of Writing while allowing him to keep his current offices. However, Chu Pou feared that some court ministers would accuse him of exploiting the court since he was Emperor Mu's grandfather, so he asked to remain at the border. The court agreed and instead appointed him Guard General, Inspector of Xuzhou and Yangzhou and stationed him in Jingkou.

Yu Bing died in 344, and Yu Yi died in 345. Yu Yi had been in command of Jin's western borders in Jingzhou for some time and was supposed to be succeeded by his son Yu Yuanzhi (庾爰之). The court favoured this, but He Chong thought that Yu Yuanzhi was too young and inexperienced to defend a vital region such as Jingzhou. He instead recommended Yu Yi's subordinate, Huan Wen, who he claimed had more calibre, to take the task. He Chong was confident that Yuanzhi would be willing to give up his position to Huan Wen. Indeed, as Huan Wen succeeded Yu Yi, Yu Yuanzhi did not object and was relocated with his brother Yu Fangzhi (庾方之) to Yuzhang (豫章郡; around present-day Nanchang, Jiangxi).

He Chong died at the age of 55 (by East Asian reckoning) in February 346. The court posthumously appointed him Minister of Works and named him Duke of Wenmu. As he had no children, his nephew He Fang (何放) succeeded him.

== Character ==
He Chong was a subject of both praise and criticism during his time. Although Chong was a prominent minister, he had no actual power to carry out reforms and sort out the government. However, he was dedicated to his work and refused to practice nepotism. He often chose capable officials over him and his family members to carry out offices, such as in the case of Huan Wen. On the other hand, some also accused him of surrounding himself with mediocre and untrustworthy people.

He Chong was an ardent Buddhist and loved giving a large portion of his wealth to monks and temples. On the contrary, he also refused to give his wealth to his family members and friends who struggled financially. He Chong's attitude attracted criticism and mockery from his Confucianist peers. Ruan Yu (阮裕) once taunted He Chong by telling him, "Your ambition is greater than the universe. Your bravery surpasses all time." When He Chong asked what he meant, Ruan Yu said, "I painted a county of thousand households, which I did not even get yet. You want to attain Buddhahood. Is this not much more enormous?" While He Chong and his brother, He Zhun (何準), were obsessed with Buddhism, another pair of brothers, Xi Yin and Xi Tan were adamant followers of the Way of the Celestial Masters. Xie Wan (brother of Xie An) once mocked them by saying, "The two Xis flatter Dao. The two Hes flatter Buddhism."
