= Emperor Ai of Jin =

Emperor of Eastern Jin from 361 to 365

Emperor Ai of Jin 晉哀帝
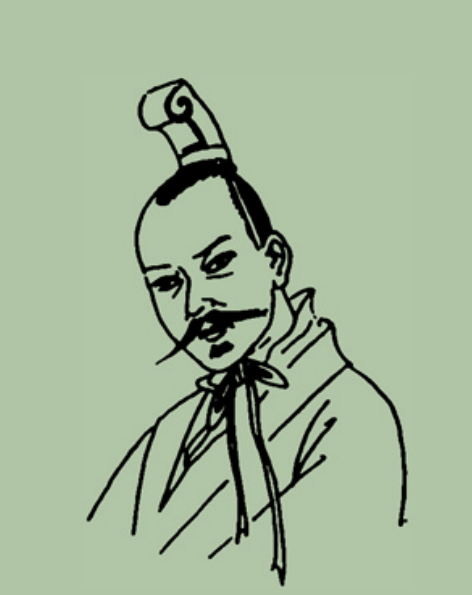

6th Emperor of Eastern Jin Dynasty
- Reign: 13 July 361 – 30 March 365
- Predecessor: Emperor Mu
- Successor: Emperor Fei
- Regent: Huan Wen; Empress Dowager Chu Suanzi

Prince of Langye 琅琊王
- Reign: 1 August 342 – 13 July 361
- Born: 341
- Died: 30 March 365 (aged 24); Jiankang, Eastern Jin
- Burial: Anping ling (安平陵), Nanjing, Jiangsu
- Spouse: Wang Muzhi
Full name
- Family name: Sīmǎ (司馬); Given name: Pi (丕)
Era dates
- Longhe (隆和): 362 – 363; Xingning (興寧): 363 – 365
Posthumous name
- Emperor Aī 哀皇帝
- House: House of Sima
- Dynasty: Eastern Jin
- Father: Emperor Cheng
- Mother: Consort Zhou

Emperor Ai of Jin (simplified Chinese: 晋哀帝; traditional Chinese: 晉哀帝; pinyin: Jìn Aī Dì; Wade–Giles: Chin Ai-ti; 341 – March 30, 365), personal name Sima Pi (司馬丕), courtesy name Qianling (千齡), was an emperor of the Eastern Jin Dynasty. During his brief reign, the actual powers were largely in the hands of his granduncle Sima Yu the Prince of Kuaiji, and the paramount general Huan Wen. According to historical accounts, he had an obsession with immortality, which resulted in his death, brought about as a result of poisoning by pills given to him by magicians in 364 and in 365.

== Early life ==
Sima Pi was born in 341, during the reign of his father Emperor Cheng of Jin, as Emperor Cheng's oldest son. His mother was Consort Zhou, who in 342 gave birth to his younger brother Sima Yi. In summer 342, Emperor Cheng grew ill. The common succession protocol, as He Chong (何充) pointed out, would mean that his oldest son would succeed to the throne, but Emperor Cheng's uncle Yu Bing (庾冰), wanting a new emperor who would also be connected to his clan as well, persuaded Emperor Cheng to pass the throne to his younger brother Sima Yue the Prince of Langya, also a son of his sister Yu Wenjun, under the reasoning that with the powerful rival Later Zhao to the north, the empire needed an adult emperor. Emperor Cheng agreed, and named Sima Yue as the heir, and Sima Yue succeeded to the throne as Emperor Kang when he died soon after. The one-year-old Sima Pi was instead created the Prince of Langya on 1 August 342. He continued in that title after Emperor Kang's death in November 344, as Emperor Kang chose to pass the throne to his infant son Sima Dan (as Emperor Mu). It is not known when he married his wife Wang Muzhi, only that she carried the title Princess Consort of Langya.

== Reign ==
Jin Aidi (晉哀帝)
Family name:	Sima (司馬; sī mǎ)
Given name:	Pi (丕, pī)
Posthumous name:	Ai (哀, āi), literary meaning: "lamentable"

In July 361, Emperor Mu died without a son. Emperor Mu's mother Empress Dowager Chu thus ordered that Sima Pi be made emperor, and he took the throne as Emperor Ai, at age 20. He created his wife Princess Consort Wang as empress in October 361, and his brother Sima Yi, who previously carried the title the Prince of Donghai, as the Prince of Langya. Since he was an adult, Empress Dowager Chu did not serve as regent for him, and he honored his mother Consort Zhou as Consort Dowager (皇太妃) in 362, but with supplies and ceremonies similar to the empress dowager. However, the decision-making process was largely in the hands of the general Huan Wen and Emperor Ai's granduncle Sima Yu the Prince of Kuaiji.

In 362, Huan, after securing the Luoyang region, requested that the capital be moved back to Luoyang, where it had been until it had been captured by Han Zhao in 311. The imperial government, under an edict issued by Emperor Ai, declined.

In 363, Consort Dowager Zhou died. In accordance with proper protocol that he could no longer honor her as mother, out of respect for Empress Dowgaer Chu, Emperor Ai did not observe the normal mourning period due to a mother.

Emperor Ai was obsessed with seeking immortality, and despite his young age, he died from Chinese alchemical elixir poisoning. In 364, he became poisoned by pills given him by magicians, and he grew so ill that he was unable to handle important matters. Empress Dowager Chu had to resume regency on his behalf.

Later in 364, Former Yan launched a major attack against Luoyang, and Huan and Sima Yu considered a counterattack to relieve Luoyang. However, as Emperor Ai died in March 365, that plan was cancelled, and Luoyang soon fell. As he did not have a son, Emperor Ai was succeeded by his brother Sima Yi, as Emperor Fei. Emperor Ai was preceded in death by his wife Empress Wang, who died about a month before he died; they were buried together with imperial honors.

== Era names ==
- Longhe (隆和, py. Lónghé): 2 March 362 – 20 March 363
- Xingning (興寧, py. Xīngníng): 20 March 363 – 28 January 366

== Family ==
- Empress Aijing, of the Wang clan of Taiyuan (哀靖皇后 太原王氏; d. 365), personal name Muzhi (穆之)
- Unknown
  - Unnamed son (b. 3 November 363) died young before his father

Emperor Ai of Jin House of Sima Born: 341 Died: 30 March 365
Regnal titles
Preceded by Emperor Mu of Jin	Emperor of China; Eastern Jin; 361–365 with Consort Dowager Zhou (361–363); Sima Yu (363); Empress Dowager Chu (364–365)	Succeeded by Emperor Fei of Jin
