= Cai Mo =

Jin dynasty minister (281–356)

- 蔡謨

Minister of Ceremonies (太常寺)
- In office ?–?

Personal details
- Born: 281 Kaifeng, Henan
- Died: 356
- Children: Cai Shao; Cai Xian
- Parent: Cai Ke (father)
- Occupation: Politician
- Courtesy name: Daoming (道明)
- Peerage: Baron of Jinyang (濟陽男)
- Posthumous name: Wenmu (文穆)

Cai Mo (281–356), courtesy name Daoming, was a Chinese politician during the Jin dynasty (266–420). When northern China fell into chaos, Cai Mo migrated to the south, where he became a prominent minister during the early Eastern Jin period. He was most notable for his work as the Minister of Ceremonies and for being a vocal opponent of his state's attempts at reclaiming the north from their rival, Later Zhao.

== Early career ==
Cai Mo came from a line of officials in Kaocheng County (考城縣), Chenliu Commandery (陳留郡), in present-day Kaifeng, Henan. After reaching adulthood, Cai Mo received the title "filial and incorrupt". He also worked as an Assistant Officer in his local government and became nominated as Xiucai. The Prince of Donghai, Sima Yue, offered Cai Mo a position in his administration, but Cai Mo rejected it.

At the turn of the 4th century CE, northern China became increasingly chaotic due to civil wars and rebellions. Cai Mo's father, Cai Ke (蔡克), was killed in 307 when the rebel Ji Sang took and sacked Yecheng. Cai Mo eventually decided to move south of the Yangtze to avoid the turmoil and serve the Prince of Langya and Inspector of Yangzhou, Sima Rui. Under Sima Rui, Cai Mo served as the Army Advisor to Sima Rui's son, Sima Shao and later to Rui himself after Rui became Prime Minister in 315. Cai Mo then worked in a succession of offices and continued to do so after Eastern Jin's establishment in 318. Cai Mo enjoyed a good reputation in the south. He shared the same courtesy name, "Daoming" (道明), as two of his peers, Zhuge Hui (son of Zhuge Jing) and Xun Kai (son of Xun Fan). The people at the time nicknamed them the "Three Mings of the Restoration" (中興三明).

In 328, the rebel Su Jun seized the Eastern Jin capital of Jiankang. He appointed Cai Mo as the Interior Minister of Wu after Su Jun drove the previous one, Yu Bing, into hiding. However, Cai Mo later joined Wen Jiao's loyalist coalition against Su Jun and returned the position to Yu Bing. After the rebellion, in 329, the Jin court appointed Cai Mo as Palace Attendant and Minister of the Five Categories of Troops. Cai Mo attempted to resign and suggested that Kong Yu and Zhuge Hui receive his rewards, but the court refused. The court later made him Secretary of Personnel and awarded him the title 'Baron of Jinyang' for his contributions against Su Jun. Similarly, Cai Mo requested his resignation, but the court rejected it.

== Service as Minister of Ceremonies ==
Despite his attempts to resign, Cai Mo continued working in the government. Cai Mo was demoted to a commoner when, while supervising the ancestral temple, the person in charge forgot to set up the memorial tablet for Emperor Ming of Jin. However, Cai Mo would return to the government shortly after, becoming Minister of Ceremonies and acting Directorate of the Palace Library. Although, at this time, he was too ill to handle his work in person.

In 338, Emperor Cheng of Jin was in the ancestral temple when he sent envoys to honour the Grand Tutor, Grand Commandant and Minister of Works. While waiting for the envoys, Emperor Cheng made an unprecedented request for music to be performed in the temple. Officials pointed out to Emperor Cheng that music-making can only happen during state banquets and sacrificial ceremonies in the temple. The Ministry of Ceremonies extensively discussed the matter. Cai Mo asserted that the emperor should be allowed to order music performed in the ancestral temple when sending envoys, and the court should obey this decision. Since then, it became a custom for the emperors to order music performed at the temple for any occasion.

In another incident, the Prince of Pengcheng, Sima Hong (司馬紘), informed the court of the portraits of Buddha in Lexian Hall (樂賢堂). Emperor Ming of Jin drew the paintings, and despite the disturbances in Jiankang, Lexian Hall remained intact. Sima Hong believed that the portraits were the reason for the hall's survival, so he asked the court to issue a eulogy for them. Emperor Cheng brought the matter to his ministers to discuss. According to Cai Mo, Buddhism was a teaching of the barbarians and not a part of the traditional system. He also asserted that there was no evidence that Emperor Ming was a Buddhist, and he likely painted the pictures as simply part of his hobby. While Cai Mo acknowledged that the paintings might have been blessed and protected the hall, he pointed out that the rebellion destroyed the rest of Jiankang, so it would be inappropriate for the court to extol them. As a result, the court turned down Sima Hong's suggestion.

Yearly, the empress would usually pay a visit to the imperial tombs. These visits were very costly, so Cai Mo suggested doing away with the practice, to which it was agreed.

== Opposing the northern expeditions ==
In 339, the regent, Yu Liang, proposed to hold an expedition north to reclaim Jin's former territories from Later Zhao. Yu Liang's equal, Xi Jian, was against this, and Cai Mo sided with Xi Jian. Cai Mo presented lengthy reasoning for his stance. He pointed out that Zhao's ruler, Shi Hu, was a superior administrator and general compared to Yu Liang. He also brought up the past failings of Zu Ti's northern expeditions and the difficulties of crossing the rivers dividing Jin and Zhao. Cai Mo convinced the court, so Yu Liang postponed his plans. When Yu Liang attempted his expedition later that year following Prime Minister Wang Dao's death, he was soundly defeated by Zhao, just as Cai Mo expected.

Later in 339, Xi Jian died. Before he died, Xi Jian requested the court to promote Cai Mo and, after his death, allow Cai Mo to inherit his position. The Jin court elevated Cai Mo to Military Director of the Grand Commandant and Palace Attendant and, after Xi Jian died, Cai Mo inherited the position of General who Conquers the North and Inspector of Xuzhou.

Shortly after Xi Jian's death, another commander, Chen Guang (陳光), wanted to campaign against Later Zhao, so the court sent him to attack Shouyang. Once again, Cai Mo weighed in to voice his opposition. He said that Shouyang's defences were too strong, that the Zhao army would be quick enough to respond to any intrusion, and that it would be wasteful to use the state's elite soldiers to take an area that would bring little benefit. The court once again sided with Cai Mo, so the court recalled Chen Guang.

Shi Hu built many ships in Qingzhou that he used to raid Jin's borders, killing many people of Jin. The issue troubled the court, which prompted Cai Mo to have the general, Xu Xuan (徐玄) and others guard the Central Plains. Cai Mo also established a reward system which awarded each person for every enemy boat they captured. At the time, Cai Mo commanded 7,000 troops, and he stationed them in Tushan (土山; northeast of present-day Suizhou, Hubei) in the east and Jiangcheng (江乘; in present-day Xianlin University City, Jiangsu) in the west. Altogether, they had eight frontier towns, eleven fortress cities and thirty beacon towers. Before his death, Xi Jian had compiled a list of around 180 subordinates whom he wanted to reward for their services. The rewards stopped because of his death, and many did not receive them. These subordinates had served meritoriously and fought in many battles, so Cai Mo requested the court to complete the list, to which the court agreed.

The stalemate between the north and the south ended in 349, as Zhao was experiencing political unrest between its princes. After Shi Hu died, a civil war between his family members followed. By mid 349, demands for an expedition became prevalent among Jin officials. Cai Mo remained sceptical at the thought, even as he quickly became a minority in the court. When asked, Cai Mo explained that Jin did not have a capable figure to lead the state to overcome Zhao. He also added that expeditions would only deplete Jin's resources and demoralise the people. The court sent their first general, Chu Pou, north in 349 and would continue to do so for the next decade with minimal success.

== Downfall and final years ==
Previously, in 346, Cai Mo became acting Minister of the Masses, and in 348, the Jin court wanted him to take up the post officially. However, Cai Mo sent petitions declining it. He said to his peers, "If I were to become Minister of the Masses, posterity would despise me, so I dare not accept the post." He continuously declined the office for three years, even after Empress Dowager Chu sent her messengers to order him. In 350, Emperor Mu sent his officials to call him to court again, but this time he feigned illness and refused to meet the emperor. Emperor Mu sent another ten messengers to call him between morning to late in the afternoon, but Cai Mo persisted. The empress dowager was about to dismiss the court when Sima Yu, angered by Cai Mo's attitude, petitioned to have him punished.

Many ministers signed the petition, which sent Cai Mo into a panic. Cai Mo brought his sons and brothers in plain clothing to present themselves to the emperor. He admitted to his faults and turned himself into the Minister of Justice. The general, Yin Hao, whom the court had appointed to command the military expeditions, initially pushed for Cai Mo's execution. However, Yin Hao's friend, Xun Xian, successfully changed his mind, fearing Cai Mo's potential to rebel. In the end, the emperor only reduced Cai Mo to a commoner.

Cai Mo spent the rest of his days at home teaching his children. Years after his removal, the Empress Dowager offered him to return to the government as Household Counsellor with the privilege of a Separate Office with equal ceremonial to the Three Excellencies. Cai Mo expressed gratitude but refused, as he was now genuinely ill. This time, the court tolerated him. Cai Mo died in 356, at the age of 76 by East Asian reckoning. He was posthumously appointed Palace Attendant and Minister of Works and posthumously named Wenmu.
