= Yu Yi (Shuyu) =

Chinese Jin dynasty consort kin, general and official (293–342)

- 庾懌

Inspector of Yu Province (豫州刺史)
- In office late 339 – 342
- Monarch: Emperor Cheng of Jin

Personal details
- Born: 293
- Died: c.April 342
- Children: Yu Tong (庾统)
- Parent: Yu Chen (father)
- Occupation: Official, military general
- Courtesy name: Shuyu (叔預)
- Posthumous name: Jian (简)

Yu Yi (Note: He should not be confused with his younger brother with a similar-sounding name (庾翼), whose courtesy name is Zhigong (稚恭).) (293 (Note: Yu's biography in Jin Shu recorded that he was 50 (by East Asian reckoning) when he died.) – c.April 342), (Note: According to the Zizhi Tongjian, Yu Yi poisoned himself in the 2nd month of the 8th year of the Xiankang era of the reign of Emperor Cheng of Jin; the month corresponds to 23 Mar to 21 Apr 342 on the Julian calendar.) courtesy name Shuyu, was a Chinese consort kin, official and military general of the Jin dynasty (266–420). He was a member of the prestigious Yu clan of Yingchuan as the younger brother of the powerful Jin minister, Yu Liang. However, after Yu Liang died in 340, it was his youngest brother Yu Zhigong who inherited Liang's military positions, and became a prominent political force during their time with their other brother Yu Bing, who handled court affairs.

== Life ==
=== Before Su Jun's rebellion ===
Yu Yi was born in 293, during the reign of Emperor Hui of Jin, with his empress Jia Nanfeng as regent. When they were young, Yu Yi won praise from his elder brother Liang for being unrestrained and simple. Yu Yi's father Yu Chen (庾琛) was the governor of Kuaiji Commandery along the southern shore of Hangzhou Bay and later served on the staff of Sima Rui the Prince of Langye (later Emperor Yuan) when Sima Rui was posted at Jianye. In the late 300s to early 310s, before he was 20, he was invited to serve under Sima Yang, the Prince of Xiyang; Yu Yi refused the invitation. He later served under Sima Chong, the Prince of Donghai, in several roles, before serving as Left General of the Guards.

=== Su Jun's rebellion and after ===
In October 325, Yu Yi's brother-in-law Emperor Ming died. As his successor Emperor Cheng was still a child, Yu Yi's elder brother Yu Liang became regent, with their sister Yu Wenjun as empress dowager. Due to Yu Liang's mishandling, Su Jun rebelled together with Zu Yue in c.December 327. When rebel forces were about to capture Jiankang in 328, Yu Yi fled south together with his other brothers Liang, Tiao and Zhigong to join Wen Jiao. After the rebellion was put down in 329, Yu Yi was made Baron of Guangrao; he then took on the post of Administrator of Linchuan.

In c.April 339, (Note: Vol.96 of Zizhi Tongjian dated this event to the 3rd month of the 5th year of the Xiankang era of the reign of Emperor Cheng of Jin; the month corresponds to 27 Mar to 24 Apr 339 in the Julian calendar.) as part of Yu Liang's plans for a northern expedition against Later Zhao, he submitted a memorial to the throne, requesting for Yu Yi to be made chief controller of all military affairs for Liangzhou and Yongzhou, Inspector of Liangzhou and garrisoned at Weixing; the memorial was approved. Later, as Weixing was deemed too remote and dangerous, Yu Yi's garrison point was shifted to Banzhou. Later that year, in c.November, (Note: Both Emperor Cheng's biography in Jin Shu and vol.96 of Zizhi Tongjian dated the Later Zhao offensive to the 9th month of that year, which corresponds to 19 Oct to 17 Nov 339 in the Julian calendar. That year had a leap 4th month.) as a response to Yu Liang's plans, Later Zhao emperor Shi Hu attacked several major cities and bases on the Jin-Zhao border, inflicting heavy losses and capturing Zhucheng (邾城, in modern Huanggang, Hubei) before withdrawing. With this major setback, Yu Liang had to cancel his plans; Yu Yi's appointment was then changed to Inspector of Yu Province. He was also placed in charge of all military affairs concerning Xuancheng, Lujiang, Liyang and Anfeng, and his garrison point was at Wuhu.

As Inspector of Yu Province, Yu Yi sent Inspector of Jiangzhou Wang Yunzhi (王允之) some poisoned wine in c.March 342. The suspicious Wang then fed the wine to a dog, which died after drinking; Wang then reported this secretly to Emperor Cheng. In response, Emperor Cheng exclaimed, "My elder maternal uncle had already caused chaos to the Tianxia. Now, my younger maternal uncle wishes to do the same!" (Note: According to Wang Yunzhi's biography in vol.76 of Jin Shu, he was from the Wang clan of Langya; Wang Dun from the same clan had rebelled against Emperor Cheng's grandfather Emperor Yuan and father Emperor Ming. Also, Yu Liang's mishandling had caused Su Jun's rebellion, which was hugely destructive to the Eastern Jin; on a personal level, Emperor Cheng lost his mother during the rebellion.) When news of Emperor Cheng's response reached Yu Yi the following month, he committed suicide by poisoning himself. (Note: However, in a strange twist of fate, both Emperor Cheng and Wang Yunzhi would die within that year. According to vol.97 of Zizhi Tongjian and the annals of Emperor Cheng in Jin Shu, he died on the guisi day of the 6th month of the 8th year of the Xiankang era of his reign, which corresponds to 26 July 342 in the Julian calendar. According to the annals of Emperor Kang in Jin Shu, Wang Yunzhi died on the jiawu day of the 10th month of that year, which corresponds to 24 Nov 342 in the Julian calendar.)

== Yu Tiao ==
Yu Tiao (庾条; fl.305 (Note: Yu Tiao's biography in Jin Shu was listed between the biographies of Yu Bing and Yu Zhigong, suggesting that he was born between Bing's 296 and Zhigong's 305/306.) - 349) was regarded as the least accomplished among the Yu brothers. He was known to have fled Jiankang with most of his brothers during Su Jun's rebellion. As Administrator of Linchuan, Yu Tiao was known to have put down a rebellion (Note: The Jin Shu contradicts itself when recording the scale of the rebellion. The annals of Emperor Mu recorded that the rebels numbered several thousands (聚众数千), whereas Yu Tiao's own biography recorded that the rebels numbered several hundreds (聚党数百人).) in his jurisdiction during the reign of his grandnephew Emperor Mu of Jin. (Note: Emperor Mu was a grandson of Yu's sister Yu Wenjun.)
