= Emperor Mu of Jin =

Emperor of Eastern Jin from 344 to 361

Emperor Mu of Jin 晉穆帝

5th Emperor of Eastern Jin Dynasty
- Reign: 18 November 344 – 10 July 361
- Predecessor: Emperor Kang
- Successor: Emperor Ai
- Regent: Empress Dowager Chu Suanzi
- Born: 343
- Died: 10 July 361 (aged 18); Jiankang, Eastern Jin
- Burial: Yongping ling (永平陵), Nanjing, Jiangsu
- Spouse: He Fani
Full name
- Family name: Sima (司馬); Given name: Dan (聃)
Era dates
- Yonghe (永和): 345 – 356; Shengping (升平): 357 – 361
Posthumous name
- Emperor Mù 穆皇帝 (lit. "solemn")
Temple name
- Xiaozong (孝宗)
- House: House of Sima
- Dynasty: Eastern Jin
- Father: Emperor Kang
- Mother: Chu Suanzi

Emperor Mu of Jin (simplified Chinese: 晋穆帝; traditional Chinese: 晉穆帝; pinyin: Jìn Mù Dì; Wade–Giles: Chin Mu-ti; 343 – 10 July 361), personal name Sima Dan (司馬聃), courtesy name Pengzi (彭子), was an emperor of the Eastern Jin Dynasty. While he "reigned" 17 years, most of these years were as a child, with the actual power in figures such as his mother Empress Chu Suanzi, his granduncle-in-law He Chong, (Note: According to He Chong's biography in Book of Jin, his wife is a younger sister of Emperor Mu's grandmother Yu Wenjun.) his granduncle Sima Yu the Prince of Kuaiji, Yin Hao, and Huan Wen. It was during his reign that Jin's territory temporarily expanded to its greatest extent since the fall of northern China to Han-Zhao, as Huan destroyed Cheng-Han and added its territory to Jin's, and Later Zhao's collapse allowed Jin to regain most of the territory south of the Yellow River.

== Prior to reign ==
Sima Dan was born in 343, during the reign of his father Emperor Kang; his mother was Empress Chu Suanzi, Emperor Kang's wife. He was his father's only son. When he was only one year old in 344, Emperor Kang grew seriously ill. His granduncles from his paternal grandmother's side, the key officials Yu Bing (庾冰) and Yu Yi (庾翼), wanted to support his granduncle, a son of his great-grandfather Emperor Yuan, Sima Yu the Prince of Kuaiji, as the new emperor, but Emperor Kang accepted the advice of another key official, He Chong (何充), and decided to pass the throne to Sima Dan despite his young age. (Note: He Chong had, two years earlier, given identical advice to Emperor Kang's elder brother and predecessor Emperor Cheng (i.e., he should pass the throne to a son), advice which was not followed.) He therefore created Sima Dan crown prince. He died less than a month later, and Crown Prince Dan succeeded to the throne as Emperor Mu.

== Under Empress Dowager Chu's regency ==
Jin Mudi (晉穆帝)
Family name:	Sima (司馬; sī mǎ)
Given name:	Dan (聃, dān)
Temple name:	Xianzong (孝宗, xiào zōng)
Posthumous name:	Mu (穆, mù), literary meaning: "solemn"

Due to Emperor Mu's young age, his mother Empress Dowager Chu became the ruling authority at court and served as regent, although she largely followed the advice of He Chong and Sima Yu the Prince of Kuaiji, who served as co-prime ministers. (Note: Sima Yu took that position after Empress Dowager Chu's father, Chu Pou (褚裒), declined.) After He Chong's death in 346, his role was taken by Cai Mo.

In 345, after Yu Yi, who had served as the commander of military forces in the western provinces (roughly covering modern Hubei, Hunan, Guizhou, and Yunnan), died, the ambitious general Huan Wen (an uncle of Emperor Mu by marriage, having married his aunt Sima Xingnan (司馬興男) the Princess Nankang) was put in charge of those provinces. In late 346, Huan, despite a lack of approval from the central government, started a campaign to conquer Cheng-Han, a rival state that possessed modern Sichuan and Chongqing. In 347, Cheng-Han fell to him, allowing Jin to control all of southern China. From this point, however, Huan became effectively independent in his decision-making over the western provinces. Sima Yu, in apprehension that Huan intended to take over the empire entirely, invited the renowned official Yin Hao to join him and Cai as a high-level official as well, intending to use Yin to counter Huan.

In 349, with rival Later Zhao in a state of disarray following the death of its emperor Shi Hu and the subsequent internecine warfare between his sons and his adopted grandson Shi Min, many of Later Zhao's southern provinces switched their allegiance to Jin, and Huan prepared a northern excursion. Instead, the imperial government, under Sima Yu and Yin, sent Emperor Mu's grandfather Chu Pou. Chu, however, withdrew after some initial failures, and the campaign resulted in the death of many civilians who were intending to defect to Jin. (Note: Chu Pou died in distress soon thereafter, in January 350.) Minor campaigns carried out by the general Sima Xun were also largely unsuccessful.

In 350, Yin himself prepared a campaign north, but failed to immediately carry out that campaign; instead, he seized even more power after accusing Cai, by repeatedly declining an honor conferred on him, was being disrespectful to the emperor, and reducing Cai to commoner status. Meanwhile, Huan became impatient after his requests were being rebuffed by Sima Yu and Yin and, around the new year 352, Huan mobilized his troops and gestured as if he were about to attack the capital Jiankang. Yin was shocked, and initially considered either resigning or send the imperial banner of peace (Zouyu Fan, 騶虞幡) to order Huan to stop. After advice from Wang Biaozhi (王彪之), however, he instead asked Sima Yu to write a carefully worded letter to Huan, persuading Huan to stop.

Later in 352, Yin launched his own campaign, but upon the start of the campaign, former Later Zhao generals in control of Xuchang and Luoyang rebelled, and his venture had to halt to deal with these rebellions. Subsequently, when his assistants, the generals Xie Shang (Note: Xie was also Emperor Mu's grand-uncle, as he was Empress Dowager Chu's uncle.) and Yao Xiang tried to attack Zhang Yu (張遇), the general in control of Xuchang, Former Qin forces came to Zhang's aid and defeated Xie's troops. Yin then abandoned the campaign entirely.

In fall 352, Yin prepared a second campaign. Initially, the campaign had some success, recovering Xuchang from Former Qin. However, Yin became suspicious of Yao's military capabilities and independence, and therefore tried to assassinate Yao. Yao discovered this, and, as Yin headed north, he ambushed Yin's troops, inflicting heavy losses on Yin. Yao then took over the Shouchun region. The people despised Yin for his military losses, and Huan submitted a petition demanding Yin's ouster. The imperial government was compelled to demote Yin to commoner status and exile him. From that point on, the imperial government was under Sima Yu alone, although it was forced to yield to Huan much of the decision-making power.

In 354, Huan launched a major campaign against Former Qin, but after advancing all the way to the vicinity of Former Qin's capital Chang'an, hesitated on further advancements, and he eventually ran out of food supplies and was forced to withdraw.

In 356, Huan proposed that the capital be moved back to Luoyang (Note: Luoyang had been the imperial capital of the Jin dynasty until its fall to Han-Zhao in July 311.), but his proposal was rejected. He then carried out a campaign against Yao, who was largely in control of the region at the time. He dealt Yao some severe losses, and Yao eventually tried to advance west and was defeated and killed by Former Qin. Once again in control of the Luoyang region, Huan re-proposed his idea to move the capital back to Luoyang, but the imperial government again declined. Later that year, the Jin vassal Duan Kan (段龕), who was in control of modern Shandong as the Duke of Qi, was defeated by Former Yan's general Murong Ke, and his domain was seized by Former Yan.

In spring 357, as Emperor Mu had his rite of passage (at age 13), Empress Dowager Chu terminated her own regency, and from that point on, Emperor Mu became officially the decision maker, although effectively, Sima Yu and Huan Wen continued to make the decisions.

== As "adult" emperor ==
In September 357, Emperor Mu married He Fani as his empress.

In 358, Sima Yu offered to resign all of his powers, but Emperor Mu declined. Later that year, a northern campaign by the general Xun Xian, intending to recapture the Shandong Peninsula, failed.

In 359, with Former Yan exerting pressure on Jin possessions south of the Yellow River, the generals Xie Wan (謝萬), Zhuge You (諸葛攸), and Chi Tan (郗曇; son of Xi Jian) advanced north to attack Former Yan, but the forces collapsed after Xie wrongly believed that Former Yan forces were near and ordered a retreat. Without aid, Jin possessions south of the Yellow River began to fall into Former Yan hands.

In July 361, Emperor Mu died without a son. Empress Dowager Chu therefore ordered that his cousin, Sima Pi the Prince of Langya, be made emperor. Sima Pi then succeeded to the throne as Emperor Ai.

== Era names ==
- Yonghe (永和): 21 February 345 – 5 February 357
- Shengping (升平): 6 February 357 – 2 March 362

== Consorts ==
- Empress Muzhang, of the He clan of Lujiang (穆章皇后 廬江何氏; 339–404), personal name Fani (法倪)

== Notes ==
Emperor Mu of Jin House of Sima Born: 343 Died: 10 July 361
Regnal titles
Preceded by Emperor Kang of Jin	Emperor of China; Eastern Jin; 344–361 with Empress Dowager Chu (344–357)	Succeeded by Emperor Ai of Jin
Preceded by Ran Min	Emperor of China; Eastern Jin; 344–361 with Empress Dowager Chu (344–357)	Succeeded by Emperor Ai of Jin
Preceded by Li Shi	Emperor of China; Eastern Jin; 344–361 with Empress Dowager Chu (344–357)	Succeeded by Emperor Ai of Jin
