= Yu Yi =

Chinese Jin dynasty consort kin, general and calligrapher (305–345)

- 庾翼

General Who Maintains The West (安西將軍)
- In office 340 – 344
- Monarch: Emperor Cheng of Jin/Emperor Kang of Jin

Inspector of Jingzhou (荊州刺史)
- In office 340 – 345
- Monarch: Emperor Cheng of Jin/Emperor Kang of Jin/Emperor Mu of Jin

Personal details
- Born: 305 or 306
- Died: 345
- Children: Yu Yuanzhi; Yu Fangzhi
- Parent: Yu Chen (father)
- Occupation: Calligrapher, military general
- Courtesy name: Zhigong (稚恭)
- Peerage: Marquis of Duting (都亭侯)
- Posthumous name: Marquis Su of Duting (都亭肅侯)

Yu Yi (Note: He should not be confused with his elder brother with a similar-sounding name (庾懌), whose courtesy name is Shuyu (叔預).) (305 or 306 (Note: Yu's biography in Jin Shu had a slight discrepancy when recording his age; it indicated that he was 21 when Su Jun rebelled (in 327) and 40 when he died (in 345). The Chinese year 328 starts from 28 Jan in the Julian calendar; this was about a month before Jiankang fell to Su Jun in early March.)– 16 August 345 (Note: According to Sima Dan's biography in Book of Jin, Yu Yi died on the gengwu day of the 7th month of the 1st year of the Yonghe era of his reign. This corresponds to 16 Aug 345 on the Julian calendar.)), courtesy name Zhigong, was a Chinese consort kin, calligrapher and military general of the Jin dynasty (266–420). He was a member of the prestigious Yu clan of Yingchuan as the youngest brother of the powerful Jin minister, Yu Liang and Yu Wenjun, wife of Emperor Ming of Jin. After Yu Liang died in 340, Yu Yi inherited his military positions, and with his other elder brother Yu Bing, who handled court affairs, they became a prominent political force during their time. As a commander, Yu Yi led a northern expedition from 343 to 344 against Later Zhao in the north and briefly fought Cheng-Han in the west before his untimely death in 345. Yu Yi's death allowed his former subordinate and nephew-in-law, Huan Wen, (Note: Huan Wen's wife Princess Nankang was Yu's niece as her mother was Yu's sister Yu Wenjun.) to take up his military command in Jingzhou from his sons with the help of Yi's court rival and brother-in-law, (Note: He Chong's biography in Book of Jin recorded that his wife was a younger sister of Yu Wenjun.) He Chong.

Apart from being a general, Yu Yi was also a very gifted calligrapher. He was considered as one of the greatest calligraphers of the Jin dynasty, standing with the likes of Wang Xizhi.

== Early life and career ==
=== Su Jun's rebellion ===
Yu Yi was described as having an elegant appearance and a deep understanding of statecraft even at a young age. In c.December 327, his eldest brother, the regent Yu Liang, came into conflict with the warlord, Su Jun. To defend himself, Yu Liang had Yu Yi defend Shitou with several hundreds of commoners. After Jiankang fell in early March 328, Yu Yi followed his brothers Yu Liang, Yu Shuyu and Yu Tiao in fleeing to Xunyang to seek Wen Jiao's help.

After the rebellion was defeated in 329, Yu Yi became Tao Kan's Army Advisor and went on to serve a number of positions, eventually reaching Attendant Officer of the Palace Gentlemen. Later, he was transferred to General Who Establishes Might and Prefect of Xiyang (西陽; west of present-day Guangshan County, Henan). During his tenure, Yu Yi appeased the people which in turn earned him their reverence. Throughout his time in office, Yu Yi was said to be composed and straightforward with his words.

=== Siege of Shicheng (339) ===
In 339, Yu Liang planned to lead an expedition to reclaim lost territory in northern China from the Jie state of Later Zhao. Yu Liang had Yu Yi camped at Jiangling as part of the campaign. However, the Zhao was provoked by Jin troops moving to Zhucheng (邾城, in modern Huanggang, Hubei), which allowed them to launch a preemptive strike on Jin. The Zhao general Kui An made his way south, routing many Jin generals along the way and capturing Zhucheng . He then set his eyes on Shicheng (石城; in present-day Zhongxiang, Hubei). Yu Yi had set up soldiers to ambush the Zhao army beforehand, and as Kui An besieged Shicheng, Yu Yi stealthily kept the city supplied with grains from Jiangling long enough for the Jin general, Li Yang (李陽) to repel Kui An. For helping in saving Shicheng, Yu Yi was granted the title of Marquis of Duting.

== Succeeding Yu Liang ==
Yu Liang died on February 340, just months after his failed expedition. Yu Yi took up his late brother's role as Chief Controller of Jiangzhou, Jizhou, Sizhou, Yongzhou, Liangzhou, and Yizhou. Furthermore, he was created the General Who Maintains The West, Inspector of Jingzhou as well as Credential Holder, and he was garrisoned at his brother's former base at Wuchang. Many people expressed scepticism towards Yu Yi due to his young age, but this turned to praise as public and private affairs both flourished within a few years under Yu Yi's strict and attentive administration.

In 342, Yu Yi tried to get the court to move his base from Wuchang to Lexiang (樂鄉; northeast of present-day Songzi, Hubei), citing weird sightings near his base as his reason. One minister, Wang Shu (王述; father of Wang Tanzhi), protested against this to the court, stating that Lexiang was too far away from the northern borders and that Yu Yi, being a prominent commander, should be responsible for holding a strategic hold such as Wuchang. The court agreed with Wang, so Yi dropped his demands.

Yu Yi was generous to many and loved to help people elevate their statuses, although he despised those who were outwardly pretentious. He was close friends with Huan Wen, who he swore a pact of friendship with and was once recommended by Yu Yi to Emperor Cheng to be trusted with more power. However, Yu Yi disliked the likes of Yin Hao and Du Yi (杜乂), who he believed were only useful in times of peace. Yu Yi did try to employ Yin Hao a number of times, however, but Yin refused to accept his offers and remained a hermit. Yu Yi also hated Yin Hao's father, Yin Xian (殷羨), who was the Chancellor of Changsha, due to his corruption and cruelty. In 343, he wrote a letter to his brother, Yu Bing, demanding that he demote Yin Xian.

== Northern expedition ==
During Yu Yi's time, northern China was dominated by Later Zhao while the region of Shu was occupied by Cheng-Han. Yu Yi had ambitions to conquer the two, so he sent messengers to Jin's vassals in the north, Murong Huang and Former Liang to coordinate themselves for Yi's grand strategy. Many members of the court believed this to be impossible, and only Yu Bing, Huan Wen and Sima Wuji (司馬無忌) agreed with Yu Yi's plans.

An opportunity came for Yu Yi in autumn of 343 when Zhao's Administrator of Runan, Dai Kai (戴開) brought thousands of families under him and surrendered to Yu Yi. This along with Murong Huang's previous successes against Zhao prompted an imperial edict to be published discussing the subject of retaking the Central Plains. Yu Yi petitioned for the general Huan Xuan (Note: not to be confused with Huan Wen's youngest son with a similar-sounding name.) to be made commander in Sizhou, Liangzhou, Yongzhou and four commanderies in Jingzhou and have him attack Danshui. In preparation, Yu Yi made Huan Wen his Subcommander, recruited new soldiers and assembled the animals and carriages. However, this burdened and upset the people living in his provinces.

Yu Yi wanted to move his base to key city of Xiangyang, where Huan Xuan was garrisoned, but fearing that the court would not allow it, he sent a petition asking to camp at Anlu instead. When Emperor Kang of Jin sent messengers ordering him to halt, Yu Yi ignored them and marched to Xiakou. Once there, he asked the court to garrison him at Xiangyang. Yu Yi had 40,000 men under his command, so Emperor Kang granted his wish and make him Commander of the expeditionary force. The emperor also had Yu Bing transferred from Jiankang to Wuchang to support his brother.

After moving his troops to Xiangyang, Yu Yi summoned his assistants, displayed his flags and armours and personally handed out bows and arrows to his men. Yu Yi's soldiers were supposedly inspired by the hardships and progress that Yi went through, which kept morale high in the army. The court further promoted Yu Yi to Colonel of the Nanman and General Who Attacks the West. Around the same time, 500 or 600 Zhao cavalries marched out of Fancheng. Yu Yi ordered his Champion General Cao Ju (曹據) to attack them, and after killing the cavalry general, Cao Ju seized around a hundred of their horses.

Many of the Han Chinese in Zhao fled to Yu Yi, and he treated them kindly while recruiting the ones he saw talented into his ranks. In August 344, Yu Yi sent Huan Xuan to attack the Zhao general Li Pi (李羆) at Danshui, but Xuan was badly routed. Yi had Xuan demoted, which caused Xuan to soon "die of shame". With his death, Yu Yi had his eldest son, Yu Fangzhi (庾方之) and his Marshal, Ying Dan take up Huan Xuan's post at Xiangang. Additionally, he had his Army Advisor Sima Xun as Inspector of Liangzhou.

== Final years ==
Emperor Kang fell deathly ill in November 344. The reason Yu Yi and Yu Bing were able to hold a considerable amount of power was because Emperor Kang and Emperor Cheng before him were both sons of the brothers' sister, Yu Wenjun. The two feared that if their nephew's son were to succeed, their ties to the emperor will become distant and a family closer to the emperor will take their place. Thus, the brothers pushed for another nephew of theirs to the throne, Sima Yu. (Note: This is despite the fact that Sima Yu's mother was not Yu Wenjun. Also, by this point, Sima Yu was already in his early 20s and would not be as pliable as Emperors Cheng and Kang were when they ascended the throne.) However, the Jin minister, He Chong, successfully convinced Emperor Kang to choose his infant son, Sima Dan, as his heir. Following Kang's death, the brothers were left angered with He Chong as Sima Dan ascended the throne to be known posthumously as Emperor Mu.

Just a month later, Yu Bing would also die of illness. With much responsibility at hand, Yu Yi left Yu Fangzhi to guard Xiangyang while Yi garrisoned himself at Xiakou to become Commander of Jiangzhou. He was supposed to be acting Inspector of Yuzhou as well, but he turned the office down. Afterwards, he made another attempt to move his base to Lexiang, but the court once again denied him. He thus went back to training and preparing his army for future campaigns against the barbarian states. Later, Yu Yi ordered Cao Ju and the Inspector of Yizhou Zhou Fu to attack Cheng-Han, and the two routed the Cheng general Li Huan (李桓) at Jiangyang.

=== Death and posthumous events ===
In 345, Yu Yi was suffering from an ulcer on his back. He was unable to perform his tasks, so he entrusted them to his son, Yu Yuanzhi (庾爰之) and his marshal Zhu Dao (朱燾). He died on August 16, and was posthumously named as Marquis Su of Duting (都亭肅侯). After his death, there was a mutiny among his soldiers led by Gan Zan (干瓚) which killed Cao Ju, but it was put down by Yu Yi's staff members Zhu Dao, Mao Muzhi, Yuan Zhen and Jiang Bin (江虨). Yu Yuanzhi was supposed to succeed his father to his positions in Jingzhou, but He Chong persuaded the court to have Huan Wen take up Yu Yi's offices instead. When Yu Yi's appointments were given to Huan Wen, Yu Yuanzhi did not protest. He and his brother Yu Fangzhi were moved to Yuzhang (豫章郡; around present-day Nanchang, Jiangxi).

Although the Yu clan had lost most of its power after the Yu brothers' deaths, the clan did retain some relevance, and one of its members, Yu Daolian, a daughter of Yu Bing, would become empress in 365 through her husband, Emperor Fei of Jin, thus restoring the clan's former prominence. However, after Huan Wen took over the government in 371, he had the family purged for posing as a potential threat.

== Calligraphy and writings ==
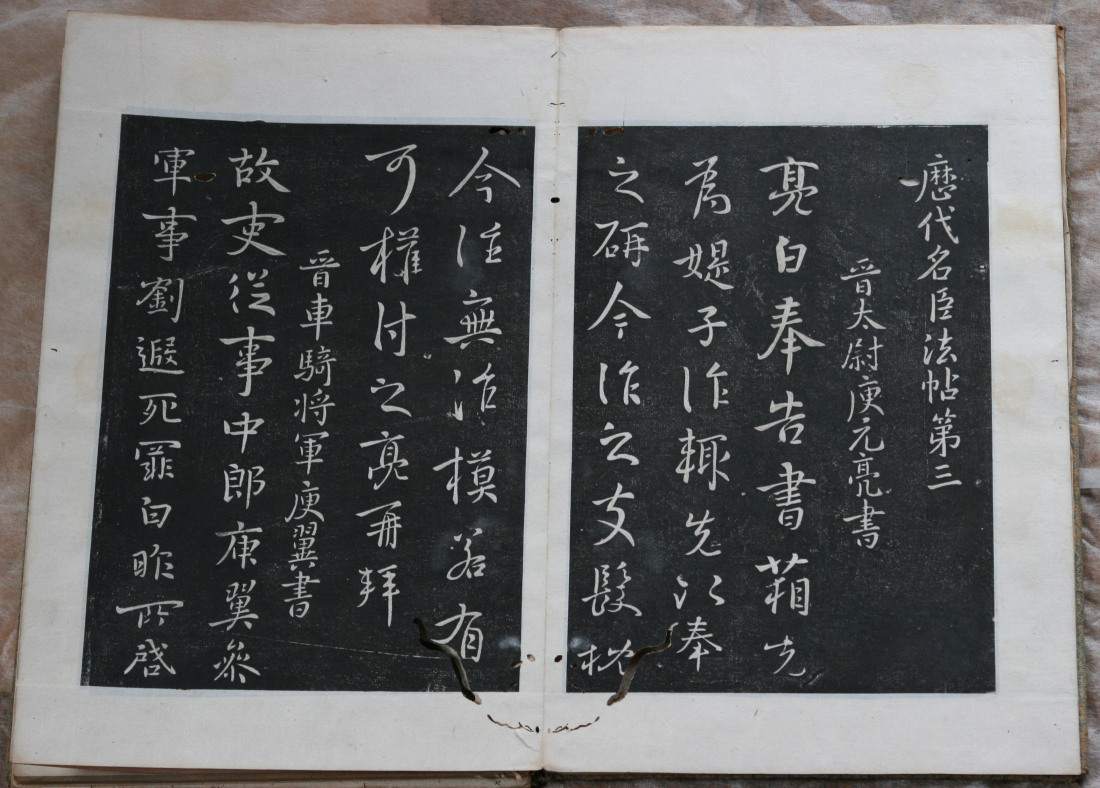
Yu Yi (left) and Yu Liang's calligraphy (right) in the Model Calligraphy from the Chunhua Pavilion.

Outside the government and military, Yu Yi was a very talented calligrapher, being a master of the cursive script and clerical script. In his book, The Calligraphy Manual of Xuanhe Era (宣和書譜), Emperor Huizong of Song considered Yu Yi's calligraphy to be equal to that of his contemporary, Wang Xizhi, who is often said by many to be China's greatest calligrapher. One of Yu Yi's works, "Guli tie (故吏帖)", contains seven rows and sixty characters. It was compiled during the Song dynasty in the Model Calligraphy from the Chunhua Pavilion (淳化閣帖), which also includes the inscriptions of other works from past calligraphers. Two works of his that survive today as copies are the "Buzheng tie (步徵帖)" and "Shengshi tie (盛事帖)", both which he wrote in cursive.

Apart from calligraphy, he was also a notable writer, and has made at least 22 volumes of essays during his lifetime which were compiled in the Quan Jinwen (全晉文).
