= Emperor Kang of Jin =

Emperor of Jin Dynasty from 342 to 344

Emperor Kang of Jin 晉康帝

4th Emperor of Eastern Jin Dynasty
- Reign: 27 July 342 – 17 November 344
- Predecessor: Emperor Cheng
- Successor: Emperor Mu
- Born: late 322
- Died: 17 November 344 (aged 22); Jiankang, Eastern Jin
- Burial: Chongping ling (崇平陵), Nanjing, Jiangsu
- Consorts: Empress Kangxian
- Issue: Emperor Mu
Full name
- Family name: Sīmǎ (司馬); Given name: Yue (岳, yuè)
Era dates
- Jianyuan (建元): 343 – 344
Posthumous name
- Emperor Kāng 康皇帝 (lit. "joyful")
- House: House of Sima
- Dynasty: Eastern Jin
- Father: Emperor Ming
- Mother: Empress Mingmu

Emperor Kang of Jin (simplified Chinese: 晋康帝; traditional Chinese: 晉康帝; pinyin: Jìn Kāng Dì; Wade–Giles: Chin K'ang-ti; late 322 – 17 November 344), personal name Sima Yue (司馬岳), courtesy name Shitong (世同), was an emperor of the Eastern Jin dynasty (266–420). He was a son of Emperor Ming and a full younger brother of Emperor Cheng. He was backed by his uncles, Yu Bing and Yu Yi to the throne, but only reigned for two years and was succeeded by his infant son Sima Dan (posthumously known as Emperor Mu of Jin).

== Prior to reign ==
Sima Yue was born in 322 as the second son of Emperor Ming, by his wife Empress Yu Wenjun. After his father died in October 325 and was succeeded by his brother Emperor Cheng, Sima Yue was created the Prince of Wu on 23 November 326. In 327, because his uncle Sima Yu the Prince of Langya wanted to yield that more honorific title, Sima Yu was created the Prince of Kuaiji and Sima Yue was created the Prince of Langya. It is not known where Sima Yue was during the Su Jun Disturbance of 327–329—whether he was captured and held hostage like his emperor brother, at his principality of Wu (which Su Jun did not occupy), or elsewhere. During his brother's reign, he received a progression of offices, but did not appear to actually participate in major decision-making.

In summer 342, Emperor Cheng grew gravely ill. He had two young sons — Sima Pi and Sima Yi, then still in cradles, by his concubine Consort Zhou. Yu Bing (庾冰), one of the top two officials and Emperor Cheng's (and Sima Yue's) uncle, fearful that the Yu clan would lose power if a young emperor were named, persuaded Emperor Cheng that in the face of the powerful enemy Later Zhao, an older emperor should be named. Emperor Cheng agreed and designated Sima Yue the Prince of Langya, despite the other top official He Chong (何充)'s opposition. He died soon after, and Sima Yue took the throne as Emperor Kang. He Chong did not make secret his opposition; after Emperor Kang took the throne, when he thanked Yu and He for making him emperor, He stated, "The reason why Your Imperial Majesty can fly like a dragon is Yu Bing. If I were listened to, we would not have this current prosperous reign." Emperor Kang appeared humiliated, but did not retaliate against He and continued to respect him. (Note: He Chong would request to become a local governor to avoid working with Yu Bing, and his request was granted.)

== Reign ==
In early 343, Emperor Kang created his wife Chu Suanzi empress.

Later in 343, Emperor Kang's other uncle, Yu Yi (庾翼), proposed a major military campaign against Later Zhao, in coordination with Former Yan's ruler Murong Huang and Former Liang's ruler Zhang Jun, both nominal Jin vassals. Most officials feared this large undertaking, but with support from Yu Bing, Huan Wen (Note: Emperor Kang's brother-in-law, having married his sister Sima Xingnan (司馬興男) the Princess Nankang), and Sima Wuji (司馬無忌) the Prince of Qiao, Emperor Kang approved the plan and mobilized troops. Yu Bing was made a governor to coordinate with Yu Yi, and He Chong was recalled to replace him, and served in conjunction with Emperor Kang's father-in-law Chu Pou (褚裒) (Note: However, Chu Pou soon yielded his post.). However, Yu Yi eventually, for reasons unknown, largely did not carry out his campaign, although he made some border attacks.

In fall 344, Emperor Kang grew ill. Yu Bing and Yu Yi wanted to support his uncle Sima Yu the Prince of Kuaiji as emperor, but He Chong, consistent with his prior advice to Emperor Cheng, suggested that Emperor Kang should pass the throne to his son Sima Dan. Emperor Kang agreed and created Sima Dan crown prince. He died two days later, and was succeeded by the one-year-old Crown Prince Dan (as Emperor Mu).

== Era name ==
- Jianyuan (建元, jiàn yuán): 11 February 343 – 21 February 345

== Family ==
- Empress Kangxian, of the Chu clan of Henan (康獻皇后 河南褚氏; 324–384), personal name Suanzi (蒜子)
  - Sima Dan, Emperor Mu (穆皇帝 司馬聃; 343–361), first son

== Notes ==
Emperor Kang of Jin House of Sima Born: 322 Died: 17 November 344
Regnal titles
| Preceded by Emperor Cheng of Jin | Emperor of China; Eastern Jin; 342–344 | Succeeded by Emperor Mu of Jin |
