= Chu Suanzi =

Chu Suanzi 褚蒜子

Empress dowager of the Eastern Jin Dynasty
- Tenure: 18 November 344 – 5 July 384
- Predecessor: Empress Yu Wenjun
- Successor: Li Lingrong

Regent of the Eastern Jin Dynasty
- Reign: 344–357, 364–366, 373–376
- Monarchs: Emperor Mu; Emperor Ai; Emperor Fei; Emperor Xiaowu

Empress consort of the Eastern Jin dynasty
- Tenure: 10 February 343 – 18 November 344
- Predecessor: Empress Du Lingyang
- Successor: Empress He Fani
- Born: 324
- Died: 5 July 384 (aged 59–60); Jiankang, Eastern Jin
- Spouse: Emperor Kang of Jin
- Issue: Emperor Mu of Jin
Posthumous name
- Empress Kangxian (康獻皇后)
- Father: Chu Pou
- Mother: Xie Zhenshi (Note: Xie Shang's biography in Book of Jin recorded that Chu Suanzi was his niece. The epitaph of Shang's father Xie Kun recorded that he had only one daughter, named Zhenshi.)

Chu Suanzi (Chinese: 褚蒜子; 324 (Note: According to Empress Chu's biography in Book of Jin, she was 61 (by East Asian reckoning) when she died. Thus by calculation, her birth year should be 324.) – 5 July 384 (Note: According to Sima Yao's biography in Book of Jin, Empress Dowager Chu died on the guichou day in the 6th month of the 9th year of the Taiyuan era of Yao's reign. This corresponds to 5 Jul 384 in the Julian calendar.)), formally Empress Kangxian (康獻皇后, literally "the joyful and wise empress"), at times as Empress Dowager Chongde (崇德太后), was an empress of the Eastern Jin. Her husband was Emperor Kang; outliving him by 40 years, she was an empress dowager during the reigns of five emperors, including serving as regents for three of them: her son Emperor Mu (344–357), her nephew-in-law Emperor Ai (364–366), and her cousin-in-law Emperor Xiaowu (373–376). Despite the power she held, she appeared to largely yield to the judgement of high-level officials who advised her and rarely made decisions on her own.

== Background and life as empress consort ==
Chu Suanzi's father Chu Pou was a mid-level official during the reign of Emperor Kang's brother Emperor Cheng, successively on the staffs of Sima Yang (司馬羕) the Prince of Xiyang and then of Sima Yue the Prince of Wu—the future Emperor Kang. He was respected for the appropriateness of his speech. Her mother was a sister of Xie Shang.

As Chu Suanzi herself grew older, she was known for her intelligence and foresight, and she was married to Sima Yue, who had then become the Prince of Langye, as his princess. When Emperor Cheng chose to pass the throne to his brother rather than his sons at his death in 342, Sima Yue became emperor, and he created her empress on 10 February 343, (Note: According to Sima Yue's biography in Book of Jin, Lady Chu was made empress on the renzi day of the 12th month of the 8th year of the Xiankang era of Emperor Cheng's reign. This corresponds to 10 Feb 343 in the Julian calendar.) when he was 21 and she was 18. At the same time, Lady Chu's mother Lady Xie was also created "Xiangjun of Xunyang" (寻阳乡君). That year, she also bore him his only son, Sima Dan. He died just one year later, however, and her infant son Sima Dan, whom he created crown prince just before his death, became emperor (as Emperor Mu).

== As empress dowager ==
=== During Emperor Mu's reign ===
After Lady Chu became empress dowager, she received an official petition stating that since her mother Lady Xie had already received a title, the deceased wives of her father, Ladies Xun and Bian, should be granted titles posthumously as well. Empress Dowager Chu dismissed the petition.

Due to Emperor Mu's young age, Empress Dowager Chu was quickly called upon to serve as regent. He Chong was her key advisor. He Chong initially wanted to share that authority with her father Chu Pou, but Chu Pou believed that as the empress dowager's father, it was inappropriate for him to serve in that capacity, and therefore remained a provincial governor. Eventually, in 345, that role went to Emperor Mu's granduncle Sima Yu the Prince of Kuaiji. After He Chong's death in 346, the authority was shared between Sima Yu and Cai Mo. After the general Huan Wen conquered Cheng-Han in 347, effectively, the imperial government lost authority over the western provinces, with Huan being only nominally submissive. In response, Sima Yu invited the equally renowned Yin Hao to join as a key advisor to the empress dowager.

In 348, after he led a failed campaign against the collapsing Later Zhao with major losses, Chu Pou died in humiliation on 1 Jan 350. During the next few years, however, without major campaigns on Jin's part, many of Later Zhao's southern provinces switched their allegiance to Jin, but not firmly so. Huan repeatedly requested permission to march north, but was constantly rebuffed by Sima Yu and Yin, who were concerned that he would be even harder to control if he recovered central and northern China for Jin.

In 350, when Empress Dowager Chu was bestowing a greater honor on Cai, Cai repeatedly declined—so much so that, as the emperor, the empress dowager, and the officials waited at the palace for the messengers that the empress dowager sent to his home to return with him, they waited from morning to evening, causing the seven-year-old emperor to be drained. Yin used this opportunity to accuse Cai of disrespect and had him excluded from government and reduced to commoner status.

In 352 and 353, Yin made two failed attempts at northern expeditions against Former Yan and Former Qin—and after the second failure, which was caused by Yin's arrogance toward one of the former Later Zhao generals who surrendered to Jin, Yao Xiang, causing Yao to rebel in fear and anger—Huan submitted a petition accusing Yin of crimes, and with popular sentiment against Yin, Sima Yu was forced to exile Yin. From that point on, the imperial government rarely went against Huan's wishes. In 354, Huan attacked Former Qin and enjoyed some initial successes, moving within miles of the Former Qin capital Chang'an, but eventually hesitated when he was close, and Former Qin fought back and forced him to retreat. In 356, Huan marched north again and was able to force Yao out of the Luoyang region, which he had occupied, and this allowed Jin to regain control of the territory south of the Yellow River. (Note: except for modern Shandong, where the warlord Duan Kan (段龕) had been a nominal Jin vassal since 351 but was conquered by Former Yan's emperor Murong Jun in 356.)

In 357, as Emperor Mu turned 14 and went through his rite of passage (jiaguanli (加冠禮)), Empress Dowager Chu officially stripped herself of her role as regent, and moved to Chongde Palace (崇德宮), which would be her residence for the rest of her life. (Note: Her maternal uncle Xie Shang also died in June that year.)

In 361, Emperor Mu died at the age of 18. As he had no sons, Empress Dowager Chu ordered that his cousin Sima Pi the Prince of Langye (Note: Emperor Cheng's oldest son) be made emperor, and he took the throne as Emperor Ai.

=== During Emperor Ai's reign ===
As Emperor Ai was two years older than Emperor Mu and already 21 at the time of his ascension, Empress Dowager Chu did not serve as regent initially. However, in 364, when Emperor Ai became poisoned by pills given by Fangshis (magicians) which he took while trying to seek immortality, he fell ill and could not handle matters of state. Empress Dowager Chu again served as regent at that point. After he died sonless in 365, she ordered that his younger brother Sima Yi the Prince of Langye succeed him (as Emperor Fei).

=== During Emperor Fei's reign ===
Similarly, because Emperor Fei was also already an adult at the time he ascended the throne, Empress Dowager Chu did not serve as regent. However, after Huan Wen's major attack on Former Yan in 369 was repelled, at much loss of life, by joint forces of Former Yan and Former Qin, he pondered ways to demonstrate that he was still in control, particularly because he was interested in usurping the Jin throne. He spread false rumors that Emperor Fei was impotent and that all his sons were actually sons of his close associates. In 371, he drafted a proposed edict for Empress Dowager Chu and submitted it to her while she was at a Buddhist shrine in her palace. She read his submission and commented that she suspected the same thing, and she signed the edict, although she added several sentences showing her grief:

This widow has suffered more than a hundred kinds of grief. I consider those who have died and those who still live, and my heart is like being cut by knives.

Huan was initially apprehensive that Empress Dowager Chu might not submit to his plan, so he was happy that she agreed despite her tone. Huan then removed Emperor Fei and replaced him with his granduncle Sima Yu the Prince of Kuaiji (as Emperor Jianwen). Empress Dowager Chu initially created the former emperor the Prince of Donghai—a title he had held previous to becoming Prince of Langye and then emperor—but Huan pressured her into demoting him further to Duke of Haixi, a title that he would be known by in many historical accounts.

=== During Emperor Jianwen's reign ===
As the niece of Emperor Jianwen, Empress Dowager Chu had few roles during his reign—particularly because he himself had to negotiate a treacherous path that Huan had laid for him, as Huan himself intended to take the throne. Emperor Jianwen honored her as Empress Dowager Chongde, based on the name of her palace. After he died in 372, he was succeeded by his son and crown prince Sima Yao (as Emperor Xiaowu), and while she initially instinctively thought that Huan should be named regent, Wang Tanzhi and Xie An, (Note: paternal cousin of Lady Chu's uncle Xie Shang.) officials loyal to the imperial Sima clan and trying to prevent a Huan usurpation, persuaded her to become regent again. She agreed, but did not take official regent capacity initially.

=== During Emperor Xiaowu's reign ===
In 373, Huan Wen visited the capital Jiankang, and the rumor at the time was that he was going to execute Wang Tanzhi and Xie An, and then usurp the throne. However, after Wang and Xie met him, he apparently changed his mind and returned to his defense post at Gushu (姑孰, in modern Ma'anshan, Anhui), although he continued to pressure the imperial government to grant him the nine bestowments. But Wang and Xie dragged on; after Huan died later in August that year, his territories were divided among his brothers Huan Huo and Huan Chong, and his nephew Huan Shixiu (桓石秀). As Huan Chong was loyal to the imperial government, the threat of a Huan usurpation dissipated. After Huan Wen's death, Empress Dowager Chu formally took over as regent. In 376, after Emperor Xiaowu turned 14 and had his rite of passage, Empress Dowager Chu again gave up her regent authorities and was again referred to as Empress Dowager Chongde. She died in 384 and was buried with honors due an empress, with her husband Emperor Kang.

== Notes ==
Chinese royalty
Preceded by Empress Du Lingyang	Empress of Jin Dynasty (266–420); 343–344	Succeeded by Empress He Fani
