= Yu Liang =

Consort kin and regent of Eastern Jin dynasty (289-340)

Yu Liang (庾亮; 289 (Note: According to Yu Liang's biography in Book of Jin, he was 52 (by East Asian reckoning) when he died. Thus by calculation, his birth year should be 289.) – 14 February 340 (Note: According to the Zizhi Tongjian, Yu Liang died on the gengzi day of the 1st month of the 6th year of the Xiankang era of Emperor Cheng's reign. This corresponds to 14 Feb 340 on the Julian calendar.)), courtesy name Yuangui (元規), posthumously known as Marquess Wenkang of Duting (都亭文康侯), was a Chinese consort kin, military general and politician of the Jin dynasty from the prominent Yu clan of Yingchuan who impressed many with his knowledge but whose inability to tolerate dissent and overly high evaluation of his own abilities led to the disastrous revolt of Su Jun and Zu Yue, weakening Jin's military capability for years.

== Early career ==
When Yu Liang was young, he was known for his skills in rhetoric and knowledge in the Taoist philosophies of Laozi and Zhuang Zhou. When he was just 15, he was invited by Emperor Huai's regent Sima Yue the Prince of Donghai to be on his staff, but he declined, instead staying in Kuaiji Commandery (the southern shore of Hangzhou Bay) with his father Yu Chen (庾琛), the governor of Kuaiji.

After Sima Rui the Prince of Langye was posted to Jianye as the military commander of the area south of the Yangtze in August 307, he invited Yu Liang to serve on his staff, and during that time, he became impressed by Yu's abilities and solemn attitude, and he took Yu Liang's younger sister Yu Wenjun to be his son Sima Shao's wife. It was while in Sima Rui's service that Yu was created the Marquess of Duting. Later, after Sima Rui claimed the imperial title after Emperor Min's death in 318 (as Emperor Yuan), Yu, along with Wen Jiao, were friends and key advisors of Sima Shao, who became crown prince. After Emperor Yuan's death and succession by Crown Prince Shao (as Emperor Ming), Yu continued to be a key advisor, and was heavily involved in his planning against and subsequent defeat of the warlord Wang Dun's forces in 324. However, Yu declined all monetary awards and the title of Duke of Yongchang. (Note: After Yu Chen's death, there were two proposals to grant him posthumous honours. The first proposal took place during Emperor Ming's reign, while the second took place during the Xianhe era (326-334) of Emperor Cheng's reign. On both occasions, Yu Liang rejected the proposal.)

== The Su Jun Disturbance ==
In fall 325, Emperor Ming grew ill. During this final illness, Sima Zong (Note: son of Sima Liang and brother of Sima Yang) and Yu Yin (younger brother of Lady Yu Mengmu (Note: Emperor Yuan's wife, posthumously honoured as "Empress Yuanjing".)) held the keys to the palace where Emperor Ming was resting. One night, Yu Liang decided to seek an audience with the emperor; he then went to Sima Zong and asked for the keys to the palace gates. Sima refused, incurring Yu's wrath. At a later date, Yu pushed open the door to Emperor Ming's chambers. In tears, Yu claimed that Sima Yang and Sima Zong were plotting to dismiss court officials. Yu then requested that the emperor make him regent and dismiss Sima Zong, Sima Yang and Yu Yin; Emperor Ming refused. Eventually, Emperor Ming entrusted his four-year-old son Crown Prince Yan, by Yu Liang's sister Empress Yu, to a number of high-level officials, including Yu, Sima Yang (司馬羕) the Prince of Xiyang, Wang Dao, Bian Kun (卞壼), Xi Jian, Lu Ye (陸瞱), and Wen Jiao. Initially, after he died in October that year and was succeeded by Crown Prince Yan (as Emperor Cheng), the officials were in charge together, but as Empress Dowager Yu became regent, Yu Liang became effectively the most powerful official in the administration. He changed from the lenient policies of Wang (Note: Wang Dao was prime minister during Emperor Ming's reign.) to stricter applications of laws and regulations, which offended the officials accustomed to Wang's lenience. Further, he became apprehensive of the generals Tao Kan and Zu Yue – neither of whom was mentioned in the list of honors and promotions announced by Emperor Ming's will and believed that Yu had erased their names from the will – and Su Jun, who had allowed many criminals to join his army. In 326, he alienated public opinion by falsely accusing Sima Yang's brother Sima Zong (司馬宗) the Prince of Nandun of treason and killing him and demoting Sima Yang to Prince of Yiyang County (弋阳县王).

In 327, apprehensive of Su's ambitions, Yu became intent on stripping him of his military command, and he promoted Su to the post of minister of agriculture in order to do so. Su refused and rebelled in c.December, (Note: Vol 93 of Zizhi Tongjian and the annals of Emperor Cheng in Jin Shu both recorded that Su Jun and Zu Yue rebelled in the 11th month of the 2nd year of the Xianhe era; the month corresponds to 30 Nov to 30 Dec 327 in the Julian calendar.) in alliance with Zu. Yu, initially believing that he could defeat Su easily, declined assistance from provincial officials, including Wen's Jiang Province (江州, modern Jiangxi) forces, but instead Su quickly descended on the capital Jiankang (name changed from Jianye due to naming taboo of Emperor Min's name) and captured it in early 328, taking Emperor Cheng and Empress Dowager Yu and forcing Yu Liang and his other brothers Yu Shuyu, Yu Tiao and Yu Yi, to flee to Wen.

Yu and Wen quickly prepared their forces for a counterattack against Su. They invited Tao to join them, and Tao, initially refusing because of his residual anger against Yu, eventually accepted, but as Tao's forces were about to arrive, a rumor spread that Tao was going to kill Yu. Yu, hearing the rumor, decided to greet Tao and prostrate himself, apologizing for his errors. Tao's anger dissipated, and they joined forces, killing Su in battle in late 328 and defeating the remnants of his forces in early 329.

== After Su Jun's defeat ==
Initially, Yu tendered many resignations to his nephew, the emperor. Wang Dao, as regent, turned those resignations down in the emperor's name. Instead, Yu was commissioned as the governor of Yu Province (豫州, by that point referring to modern central Anhui). After Tao's death in July 334, Yu succeeded him as the governor of Jing (荊州, modern Hubei and Hunan); he was posted to Wuchang (武昌, modern Ezhou, Hubei), Yu, and Jiang Provinces and the military commander of the western provinces. Even though he was not in control of the government, he continued to have great influence from his post as the emperor's uncle. While at Wuchang, Yu helped to finance Wang Yin (王隐), which allowed Wang to complete his Jin Shu; this Jin Shu was regarded as one of the Eighteen History Books of Jin.

In 338, angry at what he saw as Wang's overly lenient attitude and not sufficiently grooming Emperor Cheng to rule, Yu tried to convince Xi to join him in an effort to depose Wang, but Xi refused, and Yu never carried out his plans. (Note: Vol.96 of Zizhi Tongjian recorded that when Sun Sheng, who was then serving under Yu, heard of the latter's plans, he advised Yu not to implement them. Wang himself heard of the plot, and wrote to Yu, urging him to "do the right thing" (宜善事之).) Instead, in 339, he planned a major attack north against Later Zhao. However, after opposition from Xi and Cai Mo, Emperor Cheng ordered Yu to stop his plans. After Wang died later in September that year, the government came under the control of Wang's assistant He Chong (Note: He Chong was also Yu Liang's brother-in-law as his wife was Yu Liang's and Yu Wenjun's younger sister, per He Chong's biography in Jin Shu.) and Yu Liang's brother Yu Bing, and Yu Liang resumed his battle preparations. This drew a response from Later Zhao's emperor Shi Hu, who attacked several major cities and bases on the Jin-Zhao border, inflicting heavy losses and capturing Zhucheng (邾城, in modern Huanggang, Hubei) before withdrawing. Yu, humiliated, offered to have himself demoted; while Emperor Cheng refused, he became distressed and died on the first day of the Chinese year 340. His brother Yu Yi inherited his military offices after his death.

== Ancestors and descendants ==
Yu Chen's elder brother was Yu Gun (庾袞).

According to the Yuanhe Xingzuan (元和姓纂), Yu Chen was a grandson of Yu Dun (庾遁; (Note: Yu's name was written as "Dao" (道) in his son Yu Jun's biography in Book of Jin.) courtesy name Dexian [德先]), son of Yu Cheng (庾乘). (Note: Yu Cheng's biography is listed under Guo Tai's (郭泰) in Book of the Later Han, as Yu once studied under Guo.) Yu Dun's elder brother was Yu Ni (庾嶷), who was Minister Coachman (太仆) during the Zhengshi era of Cao Fang's reign. Two of Yu Dun's sons were Yu Jun (庾峻) and Yu Chun (庾纯). Thus, Yu Jun and Yu Chun were brothers of Yu Liang's grandfather, (Note: Yu Chun's biography in Book of Jin recorded that his father Yu Dun lived to at least 81 (by East Asian reckoning) and had six sons.) while Yu Chen and Yu Gun were cousins of Yu Jun's sons Yu Min (庾瑉) and Yu Ai (庾敳), and Yu Chun's son Yu Fu (庾旉).

Yu Liang was recorded to have at least three sons:

- Yu Bin (庾彬) was killed during Su Jun's rebellion.
- Yu Xi (庾羲), who had at least two sons (Yu Zhun [庾准] (Note: Yu Zhun's name was written as "Huai" (淮) in his son Yu Yue's (庾悦) biography in Song Shu, to observe naming taboo for Emperor Shun of Song (Liu Zhun).) and Yu Kai [庾楷] (Note: Yu Kai has his own biography in vol.84 of Jin Shu.)) and a daughter who was the mother of Pei Songzhi.
- Yu He (庾龢)
