= Emperor Fei of Jin =

Emperor of Eastern Jin from 365 to 372

Emperor Fei of Jin 晉廢帝

7th Emperor of the Eastern Jin Dynasty
- Reign: 31 March 365 – 6 January 372
- Predecessor: Emperor Ai
- Successor: Emperor Jianwen

Prince of Donghai
- Reign: 1 August 342 – 15 July 361

Prince of Langya
- Reign: 15 July 361 – 31 March 365

Duke of Haixi County
- Reign: 16 February 372 – 23 November 386
- Born: 342
- Died: 23 November 386 (aged 44); Wu, Eastern Jin
- Consorts: Empress Xiao
Full name
- Family name: Sīmǎ (司馬); Given name: Yì (奕)
Era dates
- Taihe (太和): 366 – 371
Posthumous name
- None
Temple name
- None
- House: House of Sima
- Dynasty: Eastern Jin
- Father: Emperor Cheng
- Mother: Lady Zhou

Emperor Fei of Jin (simplified Chinese: 晋废帝; traditional Chinese: 晉廢帝; pinyin: Jìn Fèi Dì; Wade–Giles: Chin Fei-ti; 342 – November 23, 386), personal name Sima Yi (司馬奕), courtesy name Yanling (延齡), was an emperor of the Eastern Jin Dynasty in ancient China. He was the younger full-brother of Emperor Ai; he was later deposed by military leader and regent Huan Wen. The title that he is normally referred to, "Emperor Fei", is not a posthumous name or temple name as is usually the case with Chinese imperial titles, but rather signified that he was deposed (with "Fei" (廢) meaning "depose(d)"). He is also commonly known by the title he was given after his removal, Duke of Haixi (海西公); he is also the last descendant of Emperor Ming (his grandfather) to become emperor of the Eastern Jin.

== Early life ==
Sima Yi was born in 342, to Emperor Cheng and his concubine Consort Zhou, who was also the mother of his only brother, Sima Pi, who was one year older than he was. Later in 342, Emperor Cheng grew gravely ill. Typically, the throne would be passed down to a son, but Emperor Cheng's uncle Yu Bing (庾冰), who wanted to control the government a little longer, suggested that since Jin was then facing the threat of Later Zhao, an older emperor was needed, and so persuaded Emperor Cheng to pass the throne to his younger brother Sima Yue the Prince of Langya, who was Yu Bing's nephew as well. Emperor Cheng agreed, and after his death, Sima Yue took the throne as Emperor Kang. Emperor Kang created Sima Yi the Prince of Donghai on 1 August 342.

In Sima Yi's youth, he went through a progression of official ranks. While he was still the Prince of Donghai, he married Yu Bing's daughter Yu Daolian as his princess consort. (Note: This marriage likely took place after Yu Bing's death, as Sima Yi was two years old when Yu Bing died in December 344.) In 361, after the death of his cousin Emperor Mu (Emperor Kang's son) on 10 July, his older brother Sima Pi took the throne as Emperor Ai on 13 July, and he took over the greater title of Prince of Langya which Emperor Ai had previously held, on 15 July. In 365, after Emperor Ai died without a son, Sima Yi took the throne by decree of his aunt Empress Dowager Chu (Emperor Kang's wife). He created his wife Princess Consort Yu empress.

== Reign ==
Even though Emperor Fei was an adult, he did not have actual power, as not only were governmental matters largely in the hands of his granduncle Sima Yu the Prince of Kuaiji, but Sima Yu himself was not fully able to make decisions, as the paramount general Huan Wen imposed many of his own decisions on the imperial government, which had no choice but to accept.

Immediately after Emperor Fei took the throne, the important city Luoyang (which had served as Jin's capital early in the dynasty's history) fell to Former Yan, because Emperor Ai's death prevented a relief force from being dispatched.

Late in 365, the general Sima Xun, the governor of Liang Province (梁州, modern southern Shaanxi) rebelled, but he was defeated, captured, and executed in summer 366.

On 5 July 366, Empress Yu died. Emperor Fei would not have another empress for the rest of his reign.

In 369, Huan launched a major attack against Former Yan, advancing all the way to the vicinity of Former Yan's capital Yecheng, but hesitated at making a final assault on Yecheng, and was subsequently defeated by the Former Yan prince Murong Chui and Former Qin relief forces.

Huan, who had ambitions of usurpation and had intended to show off his power through conquering Former Yan until the campaign's failure, decided that he would show off his power in another way. He plotted with his confidant Xi Chao (郗超) to intimidate everyone by deposing Emperor Fei. However, the emperor had been careful during his reign and had not had any major faults, so Huan figured he had to manufacture one. He spread rumors that Emperor Fei was impotent and unable to bear children—and that his sons, by his concubines Consort Tian and Consort Meng, had in fact been biological sons of men that he favored, Xiang Long (相龍), Ji Hao (計好), and Zhu Lingbao (朱靈寶). (The rumors also implied a homosexual relationship between Emperor Fei and Xiang, Ji, and Zhu.) In December 371, Huan then went to the Jiankang and intimidated Empress Dowager Chu, to issue an edict that he had drafted deposing Emperor Fei. He replaced Emperor Fei with his granduncle Sima Yu, who took the throne as Emperor Jianwen. Emperor Fei was reduced in rank to Prince of Donghai, the title he had held for most of his life. Huan put Consorts Tian and Meng to death, along with their sons. He also massacred the powerful Yin and Yu clans.

== After removal ==
Huan Wen, however, wanted to further reduce the former emperor's rank, and he proposed that the prince be reduced to commoner status. Empress Dowager Chu resisted, aiming to remain the former emperor a prince. Huan suggest the former emperor reduced to Marquess of Haixi, and finally only reduced his rank to Duke of Haixi. Huan, apprehensive that the former emperor may try to return to the throne, had him exiled to Wu (吳縣, in modern Suzhou, Jiangsu) and put under heavy guard.

In winter 372, the Taoist agrarian rebel Lu Song (盧悚) claimed to have an edict from Empress Dowager Chu to restore Emperor Fei, and he sent a messenger to the duke to persuade him to join the rebellion. Initially the duke believed him, but later realized that if the empress dowager wanted to restore him, she would send imperial guards to escort him, and therefore realized that there was no edict. Without the duke's support, Lu's rebellion collapsed.

In exile, the former emperor constantly feared death, so he spent his remaining time indulging in drinking, music, and women, to show to Huan that he had no desire for political actions. Whenever his concubines bore children, he would not dare to nurture them (so that he would not prove Huan wrong). As this became evident, Huan began to relax the restrictions against him; Huan himself died in August 373. The Duke of Haixi died in 386, during the reign of Emperor Xiaowu, and was buried in Wu. His wife, Empress Yu, was disinterred to be reburied with him according to tradition.

== Era names ==
- Taihe (太和, tài hé): 28 January 366 – 6 January 372

== Family ==
- Empress Xiao, of the Yu clan of Yingchuan (孝皇后 潁川庾氏; d. 366), aunt, (Note: Yu Daolian is a daughter of Yu Bing, who is Emperor Fei's great-uncle, being an elder brother of his grandmother Yu Wenjun.) personal name Daolian (道憐)
- Meiren, of the Tian clan (美人 田氏; d. 372)
  - Unnamed son (d. 372)
  - Unnamed son (d. 372)
- Meiren, of the Meng clan (美人 孟氏; d. 372)
  - Unnamed son (d. 372)

== Notes ==
Emperor Fei of Jin House of Sima Born: 342 Died: 23 November 386
Regnal titles
Preceded by Emperor Ai of Jin	Emperor of China; Eastern Jin; 365–372	Succeeded by Emperor Jianwen of Jin
Chinese nobility
New creation	Duke of Haixi; 372–386	Unknown
