= Emperor Jianwen of Jin =

Emperor of Eastern Jin in 372

Emperor Jianwen of Jin 晉簡文帝

8th Emperor of the Eastern Jin dynasty
- Reign: 6 January - 12 September 372
- Predecessor: Emperor Fei
- Successor: Emperor Xiaowu
- Born: 320
- Died: 12 September 372 (aged 51–52); Jiankang, Eastern Jin
- Burial: Gaoping Mausoleum (高平陵), Nanjing, Jiangsu
- Consorts: Empress Jianwenshun; Empress Dowager Xiaowuwen
- Issue: Sima Daosheng; Emperor Xiaowu; Sima Daozi; Princess Poyang; Princess Xin'anmin; Princess Wuchang
Full name
- Family name: Sīmǎ (司馬); Given name: Yu (昱, yù)
Era dates
- Xianan (咸安): 372
Posthumous name
- Emperor Jiǎnwén 簡文皇帝
Temple name
- Taizōng (太宗)
- House: House of Sima
- Dynasty: Eastern Jin
- Father: Emperor Yuan
- Mother: Empress Dowager Jianwenxuan

Emperor Jianwen of Jin (simplified Chinese: 晋简文帝; traditional Chinese: 晉簡文帝; pinyin: Jìn Jiǎnwén Dì; Wade–Giles: Chin Chien-wen-ti; 320 – September 12, 372), personal name Sima Yu (司馬昱), courtesy name Daowan (道萬), was an emperor of the Eastern Jin dynasty in China. He was the youngest son of Emperor Yuan of Jin, the founder of the Eastern Jin dynasty. Emperor Jianwen was also a younger half-brother of Emperor Ming (albeit with an age gap of about 21 years), and was installed by military leader Huan Wen. Prior to taking the throne, he had served in important roles in the administrations of his grandnephews Emperor Mu, Emperor Ai, and Emperor Fei. Both in his service to his grandnephews and in his own reign as emperor, he is generally viewed as a weak-willed figure who showed enough wisdom to continue to survive and extend Jin rule, but whose effectiveness was also compromised by his over-dedication to philosophical discussions of Taoism and other related philosophies.

== Early life ==
Sima Yu was born in 320, as the youngest son of Emperor Yuan, by his favorite concubine Consort Zheng Achun (鄭阿春). As Emperor Yuan's wife Yu Mengmu (虞孟母) had died years earlier (Note: Lady Yu died in 312.), and the mother of his oldest son Sima Shao the Crown Prince (later Emperor Ming), Lady Xun, had been forced to leave the palace due to Princess Yu's jealousy while she was still alive, Consort Zheng was effectively the mistress of the palace, although she never carried the title of empress. On 14 March 322, Emperor Yuan created him the Prince of Langya—the same title that Emperor Yuan had earlier, which was therefore considered a special honor.

In January 323, Emperor Yuan died; in October 325, Yu's half-brother Emperor Ming also died. In 326, Consort Zheng died. As Prince of Langya, Sima Yu was not permitted by law to mourn his mother. Thus, he, at age six, requested another title by which he could. His nephew Emperor Cheng (Note: Emperor Ming's elder son), himself then a young child, permitted it, and created him the Prince of Kuaiji. As he grew in age, he was given a progression of higher and higher posts, although without actual power. Yu was about 22 years old when Emperor Cheng died in July 342; Emperor Cheng's younger brother Sima Yue became the next emperor of the Eastern Jin.

== During Emperor Mu's reign ==
In November 344, Sima Yue died after reigning for about two years, and was succeeded by his infant son Emperor Mu. Emperor Mu's mother Empress Dowager Chu became regent, but she largely followed the advice of prime minister He Chong (何充). As it was customary, at this point of Jin history, for there to be two prime ministers, He Chong recommended Empress Dowager Chu's father Chu Pou (褚裒), who declined and recommended Sima Yu instead. He Chong and Sima Yu thus shared the prime minister responsibilities until He Chong's death in 346; He Chong was replaced by Cai Mo.

In 347, after the ambitious general Huan Wen, without the imperial government's approval, carried out a campaign against and destroyed Cheng-Han, annexing Cheng Han territory to Jin, the imperial government became apprehensive that Huan would use this opportunity to take over. Sima Yu thus invited the official Yin Hao, who was considered able, to join him and Cai in making important decisions, to counter Huan's influence. In 350, after Cai had repeatedly declined greater honor conferred him by the emperor, Yin accused Cai of disrespecting imperial authority and had him removed, seizing more power than he had before.

In 348, Sima Yu's heir apparent Sima Daosheng (司馬道生), who was described as careless and frivolous, was accused of unspecified crimes; he was deposed and imprisoned, and died in imprisonment. Sima Yu's wife and Sima Daosheng's mother, Princess Wang Jianji (王簡姬), also died in distress. (Note: Princess Wang might have also been imprisoned prior to her death. She was from the Wang clan of Taiyuan; her father Wang Xia (王遐) was a generation removed from Wang Chang's great-grandson Wang Shu. Wang Xia was probably a cousin of Wang Shu's father Wang Cheng (also known as Wang Donghai).) His other sons, one by Princess Wang and three by various concubines, died early, and he was left without an heir, and his concubines were not conceiving any more. He retained a magician to look at his concubines to see which one could conceive an heir, (Note: Sima Yu was 40 in c.360.) and the magician looked at all of them and opined that none was destined to give him an heir—but then he saw a dark-skinned maid who was working with textiles, who was derogatorily referred to as a Malay, (Note: The original term used was "Kunlun".) named Li Lingrong, and he, in surprised, yelled out, "She is the one!" Sima Yu therefore took her as a concubine, and they had two sons: Sima Yao in 362 and Sima Daozi in 363. Sima Yao was subsequently named heir apparent.

Around the new year 352, Huan, impatient after his requests to advance north in light of Later Zhao's collapse were being rebuffed by Sima Yu and Yin, who were concerned about his expanding power, and mobilized his troops and gestured as if he were about to attack the capital. Yin was shocked, and initially considered either resigning or send the imperial banner of peace (Zouyu Fan, 騶虞幡) to order Huan to stop. After advice from Wang Biaozhi (王彪之), however, he instead asked Sima Yu to write a carefully worded letter to Huan, persuading Huan to stop.

After Yin himself launched unsuccessful northern campaigns in 352 and 353—the latter at great loss of life and property—Huan submitted a petition accusing Yin of crimes. The imperial government, led by Sima Yu, felt compelled to depose Yin in 354. From that point on, Sima Yu became the sole prime minister, although he was often forced to submit to Huan's wishes on important matters. Later in 354, Huan himself launched a campaign north against Former Qin, one of the successor states to Later Zhao, but after initial successes, he was forced to withdraw as he hesitated at attacking Former Qin's capital Chang'an and ran out of food supplies.

In 358, Sima Yu offered to resign and return all authority to Emperor Mu. Emperor Mu declined.

In 361, Emperor Mu died without a son, and by order of Empress Dowager Chu, his cousin Sima Pi the Prince of Langya ascended the throne as Emperor Ai. Sima Yu continued in his post as prime minister.

== During Emperor Ai's reign ==
In 363, when Emperor Ai's mother Princess Dowager Zhou died, Sima Yu served as regent for the three-month mourning period.

In 364, Emperor Ai, who was obsessed with immortality, was poisoned by pills given him by magicians, and he could not handle important affairs of state. Empress Dowager Chu again served as regent, but important decisions were made by Sima Yu and Huan Wen. In 365, with the Former Yan regent Murong Ke besieging the important city Luoyang, Sima Yu and Huan discussed launching a counterattack to relieve Luoyang, but when Emperor Ai died in spring 365, the plans were cancelled. Emperor Ai was succeeded by his brother Sima Yi the Prince of Langya, who took the throne as Emperor Fei. Sima Yu continued in his role as prime minister.

== During Emperor Fei's reign ==
In late 365, Emperor Fei offered the title Prince of Langya to Sima Yu and further created his heir apparent Sima Yao the Prince of Kuaiji. Sima Yu declined on his son's behalf and further himself declined the title of Prince of Langya, continuing to refer to himself as the Prince of Kuaiji, and Emperor Fei did not insist on his taking the greater title.

In 369, after Huan Wen launched a major attack against Former Yan but suffered a devastating defeat at the hands of Murong Chui, he considered another way to showcase his power. He decided to depose Emperor Fei, and he spread false rumors that Emperor Fei was impotent and that his sons were actually sons of men that he favored (implying a homosexual relationship between him and those men). In winter 371, Huan forced Empress Dowager Chu to issue an edict deposing Emperor Fei and replacing him with Sima Yu, who took the throne with trepidation but felt he had no choice.

== Reign ==
An immediate issue that Emperor Jianwen had to deal with upon taking the throne was Huan's suspicions toward his older half-brother Sima Xi (司馬晞) the Prince of Wuling, whose interest in military matters made Huan concerned that he would oppose Huan. Huan therefore falsely accused him of plotting treason, and Emperor Jianwen agreed to remove Sima Xi from his posts. Subsequently, however, Huan manufactured evidence against Sima Xi and petitioned that he be put to death. Emperor Jianwen wrote to Huan, stating that he did not want to kill his brother—and that if he was forced to, he would instead yield the throne. Huan, not willing to risk a confrontation, settled for having Sima Xi and his sons demoted to commoner status and exiled. (Note: Sima Xi outlived both Huan and his half-brother; he died in 381 at the age of 66 (by East Asian reckoning).)

In summer 372, Emperor Jianwen grew ill, and repeatedly tried to summon Huan to the capital—perhaps to offer him the throne—but Huan, concerned that it was a trap, continuously declined. Emperor Jianwen soon died, and was succeeded by his 10-year-old son Sima Yao, whom he created crown prince right before his death. As Huan himself died in August 373, the threats of a Huan usurpation dissipated, and Jin rule continued for several decades.

== Era name ==
- Xian'an (咸安, xián ān): 6 January 372 – 9 February 373

== Family ==
- Empress Jianwenshun, of the Wang clan of Taiyuan (簡文順皇后 太原王氏; d. 348), personal name Jianji (簡姬)
  - Sima Daosheng (會稽思世子 司馬道生), first son
  - Sima Yusheng (司馬俞生), second son
- Empress Dowager Xiaowuwen, of the Li clan (孝武文皇太后 李氏; 351–400), personal name Lingrong (陵容)
  - Sima Yao, Emperor Xiaowu (孝武皇帝 司馬曜; 362–396), third son
  - Sima Daozi, Prince Wenxiao of Kuaiji (會稽文孝王 司馬道子; 364–403), fifth son
  - Princess Poyang (鄱陽公主)
    - Married Wang Gu of Langya, Duke Shixing (琊瑯 王嘏), and had issue (one son)
- Shuyi, of the Hu clan (淑儀 胡氏)
  - Sima Yu, Prince Xian of Linchuan (臨川獻王 司馬鬱), fourth son
  - Sima Zhusheng (司馬朱生), sixth son
- Shuyi, of the Wang clan (淑儀 王氏)
  - Sima Tianliu (司馬天流), seventh son
- Shuyi, of the Xu clan (淑儀 徐氏)
  - Princess Xin'anmin (新安愍公主), personal name Daofu (道福), third daughter
    - Married Huan Ji of Qiao, Duke Linhe (譙國 桓濟), the second son of Huan Wen
    - Married Wang Xianzhi of Langya (琊瑯; 344–386), and had issue (Empress Anxi)
- Unknown
  - Princess Wuchang (武昌公主)
    - Married Huan Xiu of Qiao (譙國 桓脩), a son of Huan Chong

== Notes ==
Emperor Jianwen of Jin House of Sima Born: 320 Died: 12 September 372
Regnal titles
Preceded by Emperor Fei of Jin	Emperor of China; Eastern Jin; 372 with Huan Wen (372)	Succeeded by Emperor Xiaowu of Jin
