= Xi Jian =

Jin dynasty general (269-339)

- 郗鑒

Grand Commandant (太尉)
- In office 338 – 339
- Monarch: Emperor Cheng of Jin

Personal details
- Born: 269
- Died: 8 October 339
- Relations: Xi Chao (grandson); Xi Lü (great-great-grandfather)
- Children: Xi Tan (郗昙) (Note: Xi Tan's daughter later married, and divorced, Wang Xizhi's son Wang Xianzhi.); Xi Yin; Xi Yong; Xi Xuan (郗璿), wife of Wang Xizhi
- Occupation: Military general
- Courtesy name: Daohui (道徽)
- Posthumous name: Wencheng (文成)

Xi Jian (269 – 8 October 339), courtesy name Daohui, was a Chinese military general of the Jin dynasty (266–420). As a refugee leader in the north at the time of the Disaster of Yongjia, he later fled south to escape the encroaching Later Zhao dynasty and join the Eastern Jin, where he quickly became an important pillar of the dynasty through his contributions during the rebellions of Wang Dun and Su Jun. Among the refugee commanders of his time, he was one of the very few to be trusted by the imperial court, and by the end of his life, he formed part of a triumvirate within the Jin government that consisted of him and two other top-ranking ministers, Yu Liang and Wang Dao. His name can be rendered as Chi Jian.

== Early career ==
Xi Jian was from Gaoping County (高平縣; northwest of present-day Weishan County, Shandong) and was very poor in his youth. His great-great-grandfather was Xi Lü, an official under the Han dynasty warlord Cao Cao. Xi Jian was determined to better his livelihood, so he began reading the scriptures and whenever he farmed, he would chant what he had learnt. Eventually, he landed an office serving under the Prince of Zhao, Sima Lun. However, he disliked the prince's growing imperial ambition and soon resigned.

When Sima Lun usurped the throne in 301, Xi Jian refused to return to his service despite offers of lofty titles. The same year, Sima Lun was killed, and Xi Jian returned to the government to serve Liu Shi (劉寔). A few years later, Xi Jian received respective offers from the Prince of Donghai, Sima Yue, and Yue's general, Gou Xi, to serve under them. Xi Jian refused both of them, sensing that the two men will soon be turning on one another. Eventually, Xi Jian decided to retire from the government.

== Disaster of Yongjia and as Inspector of Yanzhou ==
In July 311, the rebel forces of Han-Zhao took over Luoyang and captured Emperor Huai, in what would be known as the Disaster of Yongjia. During the chaos, Xi Jian was captured by Chen Wu (陳午), a general of the Qihuo refugee army. Chen Wu wanted to employ Xi Jian and make him their leader, but Xi managed to escape. After Chen Wu was defeated, Xi Jian returned to his hometown in Gaoping, where most of the inhabitants were desperate to escape the ongoing war in the north. Xi Jian thus became a refugee leader and led his followers fled to Mount Yi in 313, where they defended themselves from enemies.

The Prince of Langya and Jin's paramount prince in the south, Sima Rui, came into contact with Xi Jian, who he appointed Inspector of Yanzhou. Xi Jian remained at Mount Yi, surviving constant attacks from Shi Le and Xu Kan. However, with no aid from the capital as well as an ongoing famine around his domain, his people were beginning to feel overwhelmed. Xi Jian's followers still grew, as many refugees flocked over to him and lived on mice and swallows, but this only meant that more food was needed to keep the refugees fed. In the end, Xi Jian eventually retreated to Hefei with his followers in 322 as Later Zhao forces engulfed the region. Despite his setback, Xi Jian was commended by many for his virtuous character, and was appointed a Master of Writing in the government.

== Wang Dun's Rebellion ==
By the time Xi Jian moved southwards, Sima Rui (Note: Emperor Yuan ascended the throne in 318 after news of the execution of Emperor Min of Jin reached Jiankang.) had just been defeated by his general Wang Dun, who placed Jin under his control. Sima Rui grew ill from the defeat and died the following year, leaving the throne to his son, Emperor Ming of Jin. Emperor Ming wanted someone to challenge Wang Dun within the state, so he made Xi Jian the Inspector of Yanzhou and Chief Controller of north of the Yangzi. However, Wang Dun saw through this and instead petitioned to have Xi Jian made Prefect of the Masters of Writing instead. Later that year, Emperor Ming summoned Xi Jian to the capital.

On the way, Xi Jian visited Wang Dun's base, where they discussed the old court in the north. Wang Dun criticized the minister Yue Guang for his lack of talent while praising his counterpart Man Fen (滿奮). Xi Jian defended Yue Guang, saying that he had been a loyal man who tried to protect the Crown Prince Sima Yu while Man Fen betrayed him to Sima Lun. Wang Dun responded to him that Man Fen only did so under pressure, and Xi Jian replied that a real man remains true to himself in both life and death. Wang Dun was offended by this implied insult, and apprehended Xi Jian in his house for some time. He eventually released him to continue his way to Jiankang, despite his advisors' urge to kill him. When Xi Jian reached Jiankang, he began plotting with Emperor Ming against Wang Dun.

In 324, Emperor Ming was ready to campaign against Wang Dun. Xi Jian turned down the appointments Emperor Ming gave to him and instead advised him to reach out to Su Jun and Liu Xia (劉遐) to join his war against Wang Dun. Emperor Ming defeated Wang Dun's forces the same year, and Wang Dun died from natural causes before the war ended. Xi Jian told Emperor Ming that Wang Dun's remains should be given back to his family members to display himself as righteous. Later, Xi Jian called for Emperor Ming to execute Wang Dun's partisans on two occasions, but both times he found his suggestions rejected.

== Su Jun's Rebellion ==
Emperor Ming died at a young age in 325. He was succeeded by his child heir, Emperor Cheng of Jin, guided by his brother-in-law Yu Liang. Months prior to his death, he appointed Xi Jian as General of Chariots and Cavalry, Chief Controller of Xuzhou, Yanzhou, and Qingzhou, and Inspector of Yanzhou. After his death, Xi Jian held a series of important offices for the next two years.

In 327, a rebellion broke out led by Su Jun and Zu Yue. Xi Jian offered to send reinforcements from Xuzhou to the capital, but Yu Liang turned him down. The capital was lost to rebel forces the following year and Su Jun became the de facto head of state with Emperor Cheng of Jin under his control. Yu Liang slipped away to Xunyang (尋陽, in present-day Huangmei County, Hubei) where he met Wen Jiao and conspired with him to reclaim the capital. He also got Xi Jian to join them, making him Minister of Works.

Xi Jian proposed a strategy to Wen Jiao. There was a rumour that Su Jun was intending to bring the emperor east to Kuaiji. He told him that the loyalists should occupy strategic locations around the area and fortify them while scorching the fields. That way, when Su Jun arrives, it would be difficult for him to attack and there would be no rations for his army. Xi Jian led the eastern army over to Daye (大業, in present-day Suzhou, Jiangsu), Qu'a (曲阿縣; present-day Danyang, Jiangsu), and Chengting (庱亭, in present-day Wujin County, Jiangsu) where they set up barricades to weaken Su Jun's assaults.

Surely enough, Su Jun arrived at Daye on his way to Kuaiji, where he besieged the commander Guo Mo. As fighting intensified in Daye, Guo Mo secretly abandoned his men and left them to fend Su Jun off by themselves. Xi Jian's generals were alarmed, and his advisor Cao Na (曹納) told him that they should fall back to Guangling. Xi Jian, however, wanted to hold on to his defences and scolded Cao Na for recommending him to retreat. Fortunately for Xi Jian's group, loyalist forces led by Tao Kan, Wen Jiao, Yu Liang and Zhao Yin (趙胤) eventually arrived at Su Jun's base in Shitou, diverting Su Jun's attention away from Daye. Su Jun was killed in battle at Shitou when facing Tao Kan.

Su Jun's brother, Su Yi (蘇逸), was chosen by the remnants of the rebels to be their new leader. The rebellion continued on into the next year, and Su Yi was killed while fleeing from the loyalist army approaching Shitou. Xi Jian provided the final blow to the rebellion as he sent his general Li Hong (李閎) to destroy Han Huang and the remaining rebels at Mount Pingling (平陵山, in present-day Liyang, Jiangsu). For his efforts, Xi Jian was made Palace Attendant, Minister of Works, and Duke of Nanchang County by Emperor Cheng.

== After Su Jun's Rebellion ==
Xi Jian lived for another decade, serving the Jin dynasty diligently. In the beginning of 331, Xi Jian repelled a Later Zhao invasion in Lou County (婁縣; in present-day Kunshan, Jiangsu) led by Liu Zheng. Later in 335, he sent his general Chen Guang (陳光) to defend Jiankang from a Later Zhao invasion, although the invasion proved to be a false flag. On 19 June 338, he would receive his highest position yet as Grand Commandant.

Between 338 and 339, Xi Jian found himself as an opposition to Yu Liang's attempts at drastic measures. In 338, Yu Liang wanted to lead armies against Wang Dao as he believed that Wang was harbouring corruption in the government. Yu Liang invited Xi Jian to join him, but he soundly rejected it, so Yu Liang called off his plans. The next year, Yu Liang wanted to campaign against Later Zhao, even getting the approval of Wang Dao and Emperor Cheng at first, but Xi Jian convinced the Prime Minister and Emperor that Jin should be conserving their resources to strike at the right time. Once again, Yu Liang's plans were rejected, although Yu Liang later got his wish by the end of the year and attempted to invade Zhao, which ended in failure.

Xi Jian grew deathly ill in 339. He wrote a memorial of resignation to Liu Xia (劉遐), demanding that Cai Mo be the one to succeed his offices. Xi Jian soon died and was posthumously named as "Wencheng (文成)".
