= Wen Jiao =

Chinese Jin dynasty official (288-329)

Wen Jiao (溫嶠) (288 (Note: According to Wen Jiao's biography in Book of Jin, he was 42 (by East Asian reckoning) when he died. Thus by calculation, his birth year should be 288.) – 6 June 329 (Note: According to the annals of Emperor Cheng in Book of Jin and vol.94 of Zizhi Tongjian, Wen Jiao died on the yiwei day of the 4th month of the 4th year of the Xianhe era. This corresponds to 6 Jun 329 on the Julian calendar.)), courtesy name Taizhen (太真), formally Duke Zhongwu of Shi'an (始安忠武公), was a Chinese military general and politician during the Jin dynasty. He was best known for his role in putting down two rebellions, led by Wang Dun and Su Jun respectively, which threatened the existence of the Eastern Jin.

== Family ==
Wen Jiao's father Wen Dan (溫澹) was a commandery governor, and his uncle Wen Xian (溫羨; died c.late 307) (Note: The annals of Emperor Huai in Book of Jin recorded that Wen Xian was made situ on 8 Feb 307. Wen Xian's biography in the same work recorded that he died soon after receiving the post. Per vol.86 of Zizhi Tongjian, Wang Yan was made situ on 8 January 308 (yihai day of the 11th month of the 1st year of the Yongjia era). Thus, Wen Xian must have died in late 307.) (Note: Wen Xian has a biography in vol.44 of Book of Jin; Wen Xian's biography recorded that he was a grandson of Wen Hui, while Wen Jiao's biography in the same work recorded that Wen Xian was older than Wen Dan.) was an early Jin prime minister. His maternal aunt Lady Cui, a daughter of Cui Can (崔参), was the wife of the general Liu Kun, who for years tried in vain to stop Han-Zhao forces from seizing Bing Province (并州, modern central and northern Shanxi) from Jin. (Note: The biography of Liu Kun's son Liu Qun in Book of Jin recorded that Wen Jiao wrote in memorials that Liu Qun was his yidi, while Cui Yue and Lu Chen were his maternal cousins. The term yidi is ambiguous as it can mean the younger brother or son of one's maternal aunt or one's wife.) (Note: An Wen Shi Pu annotation in A New Account of the Tales of the World recorded that Wen Dan married a daughter of Cui Can.) Another of Wen Jiao's maternal aunts was Lu Zhi's wife. (Note: Lu Chen's (Lu Zhi's son) biography in Book of Jin recorded that his maternal aunt was Liu Kun's wife, while Cui Yue's biography in the same work recorded that he was a great-grandson of Cui Lin and a paternal nephew of Liu Kun's wife.)

== Biography ==
=== Duan Pidi affiliation ===
In 317, after Emperor Min had been captured by Han-Zhao, Liu Kun, who had then lost Bing Province and was at the headquarters of Duan Pidi, the governor of You Province (幽州, modern Beijing, Tianjin, and northern Hebei), commissioned Wen Jiao to head to Jiankang to offer Sima Rui the Prince of Langye a petition to assume imperial title. Although his mother Lady Cui tried to stop him from leaving, he went anyway. Once Wen arrived in Jiankang, many of the Jin officials in the provisional capital, including Wang Dao, Zhou Yi, and Yu Liang were impressed by his talents and sought to befriend him. He sought to return north, but Sima Rui ordered him to stay. When Liu Kun was killed by Duan in 318 (after Duan became concerned that Liu, whose son Liu Qun (劉羣) had been captured by his rival for the Duan tribal leadership, Duan Mobo, might betray him to rescue Liu Qun), Wen, having heard that his mother Lady Cui had also died in the interim, again sought to return north, but Sima Rui, who had by now taken the imperial title (as Emperor Yuan), ordered him to stay and further ordered him to serve in his administration. He became a friend and a trusted advisor of the crown prince, Emperor Yuan's son Sima Shao. When the warlord Wang Dun resisted Emperor Yuan and captured the capital Jiankang in 322, it was Wen who stopped Crown Prince Shao from taking the risky maneuver of engaging in a final confrontation with Wang. As the years went by, Wen became known for being a good judge of talent.

=== Advisor to Emperor Ming ===
After Emperor Yuan died in January 323, Crown Prince Shao took the throne as Emperor Ming. He continued to consult Wen on many important matters, and Wang Dun sought to stop that by forcing Wen to become an assistant of his. Once Wen arrived at Wang's camp, he pretended to submit to Wang, flattering him and giving him many practical suggestions. Wang came to believe he had won Wen over and, in 324, as he grew ill and pondered his next move, he sent Wen back to Jiankang as its mayor, so that Wen could watch the emperor's move. Instead, Wen revealed Wang's illness and plans to Emperor Ming, which helped lead to Wang's forces' defeat when they attacked the capital later that year.

=== Yu Liang and Su Jun ===
After Emperor Ming died in 325, his will left a number of high level officials in charge of his four-year-old son Emperor Cheng's administration. However, Yu Liang, as the brother of Empress Dowager Yu, was the actual regent. His youthful arrogance quickly offended the generals Su Jun, Zu Yue (祖約), and Tao Kan, and he therefore in 326 made Wen the governor of the key Jiang Province (江州, modern Jiangxi), to defend against possible military rebellions. Later, when Su became sufficiently angered by Yu that he rebelled in c.December 327, Wen wanted to immediately come to Yu's aid, but Yu, overly confident that he could defeat Su and further concerned about Tao (whose Jing Province (荊州, modern Hubei) was to Wen's west), declined.

However, in early 328, it became clear that the imperial forces in the capital were in trouble, as Su defeated every single force that stood in his way. Wen quickly headed toward Jiankang notwithstanding Yu's reservations, but could not get to Jiankang before the capital fell to Su. Yu Liang was forced to flee together with his brothers Yu Shuyu, Yu Tiao and Yu Yi, and Emperor Cheng and his mother Empress Dowager Yu were captured. Empress Dowager Yu soon died from distress. The Yu brothers joined Wen, and they considered how they could defeat Su. Wen's cousin Wen Chong (溫充) suggested that they offer the title of the supreme commander to Tao, and they did so. However, Tao was still resentful of Yu and therefore initially refused. Eventually, however, after his anger was over, he accepted, and he, Wen, and Yu combined their forces and headed east to Jiankang. In winter 328, during a battle with Su, Su was killed, and they subsequently defeated the remnants of Su's army in 329. For his contributions, Wen was created the Duke of Shi'an.

=== Death ===
Jiankang having been heavily damaged during the war (and the palace having been burnt during the war), Wen considered moving the capital to Yuzhang (豫章, in modern Nanchang, Jiangxi), but after Wang Dao opposed, noting that Jiankang was in a better position to monitor the northern defenses against Later Zhao, Wen agreed to keep the capital at Jiankang. Most officials requested that he stay in Jiankang to serve as regent, but Wen, believing that Emperor Ming had intended that Wang Dao serve in that role, declined and, after leaving all of his supplies with Wang, set out to return to Jiang Province. On the way, however, he suffered problems with his tooth or teeth, and after having it/them pulled, suffered a stroke and died. He was buried at Yuzhang. The imperial government, because of his great contributions, considered building a magnificent tomb for him north of Emperor Ming's tomb, but Tao noted that Wen himself was thrifty in his own spendings and would not have wanted the government to expend effort for money for such a tomb, and so the proposal was not carried out.
