= Yu Wenjun =

Yu Wenjun 庾文君

Empress consort of the Eastern Jin dynasty
- Tenure: 25 July 323 – 19 October 325
- Successor: Du Lingyang

Empress dowager of the Eastern Jin dynasty
- Tenure: 19 October 325 – March 328
- Successor: Chu Suanzi
- Born: 297
- Died: March or April 328 (aged 30–31); Jiankang, Eastern Jin
- Spouse: Emperor Ming of Jin
- Issue: Emperor Cheng of Jin; Emperor Kang of Jin; Princess Xuan of Nankang (died c.369) (Note: The Jin Zhongxing Shu recorded that Princess Nankang's name was Sima Xingnan. She later married Huan Wen. Huan Wen's biography in the Tang-era Book of Jin recorded that Huan Wen's heir Huan Xi was appointed Inspector of Yuzhou just before the death of Princess Nankang. Huan Wen then took the opportunity of the princess's death to reject Huan Xi's appointment and then began constructing city walls around Guangling. Vol.102 of Zizhi Tongjian dated the construction of Guangling's city walls to the 4th year of the Taihe era of the reign of Emperor Fei of Jin.)
Posthumous name
- Empress Mingmu (明穆皇后)
- Father: Yu Chen
- Mother: Lady Xun

Yu Wenjun (Chinese: 庾文君; 297 – March or April 328), (Note: According to the annals of Emperor Cheng in Book of Jin and vol.94 of Zizhi Tongjian, Empress Dowager Yu died on the bingzi day of the 3rd month of the 3rd year of the Xian'he era of his reign. However, there is no bingzi day in that month; the month corresponds to 27 Mar to 25 Apr 328 in the Julian calendar. It is possible that the correct month was the 2nd (二) month; the corresponding date in the Julian calendar is 24 Mar 328.) formally Empress Mingmu (明穆皇后, lit. "the understanding and solemn empress"), was a member of the Yu clan of Yingchuan and an empress of the Chinese Jin dynasty by marriage to Emperor Ming. She served as regent during the minority of her son Emperor Cheng from 2 November 325 (Note: According to the annals of Emperor Cheng in Book of Jin, Empress Dowager Yu assumed regency on the guimao day of the 9th month of the 3rd year of the Taining era of his father's reign. This corresponds to 2 Nov 325 in the proleptic Gregorian calendar.) to early March 328, (Note: According to the annals of Emperor Cheng in Book of Jin, Su Jun occupied Jiankang on the bingchen day of the 2nd month of the 3rd year of the Xianhe era of his reign; the date corresponds to 4 Mar 328 in the proleptic Gregorian calendar.) when the capital Jiankang fell to Su Jun and Emperor Cheng became Su's captive.

== Life ==
Empress Yu's father Yu Chen (庾琛) was the governor of Kuaiji Commandery along the southern shore of Hangzhou Bay and later served on the staff of Sima Rui the Prince of Langye (later Emperor Yuan) when Sima Rui was posted at Jianye. She was considered kind and beautiful, and Sima Rui took her to be his son Sima Shao's wife. (Note: It is unknown if the marriage took place during Emperor Yuan's tenure as Prince of Jin in 317, or after he claimed the imperial title in 318. But the marriage should have taken place no later than 321, as their eldest son (the future Emperor Cheng) was born in Dec 321 or Jan 322.) Her eldest brother Yu Liang became a key friend and advisor to Sima Shao. Later, after Sima Rui declared himself emperor in April 318 and created Sima Shao crown prince on 10 May, she became crown princess. After Emperor Yuan died in January 323 and Sima Shao succeeded to the throne as Emperor Ming, she became empress. She had two sons with him, Sima Yan and Sima Yue, the future emperors Cheng and Kang respectively. She was also the first non-posthumous (Note: Emperor Yuan's biography in Book of Jin indicate that his consort Lady Yu was posthumously named empress on 10 Oct 320.) empress of the Eastern Jin, and the first empress of the Jin dynasty since Liang Lanbi (Emperor Huai's consort). Besides Yu Liang, Empress Yu's other brothers Yu Yi and Yu Bing were important Eastern Jin officials, while Yu Shuyu and Yu Tiao were less prominent. Her younger sister was the wife of He Chong.

=== Regency ===
Emperor Ming only ruled briefly (about two years) and died in 18 October 325. Initially, he left a balance of power between high-level officials with whom he entrusted the four-year-old Crown Prince Yan, who later succeeded to the throne as Emperor Cheng on 19 October 325. Empress Yu was honored as Empress Dowager Yu on the same day, and the officials encouraged her to become regent. Under this arrangement, Yu Liang became the most powerful official of the empire. He became apprehensive of the generals Su Jun, Zu Yue, and Tao Kan, each of whom suspected Yu of erasing their names from Sima Shao's will, which promoted and honored a large number of officials. Yu Liang was also apprehensive of Emperor Ming's step-uncle Yu Yin (虞胤) and the Imperial Princes Sima Zong (司馬宗) the Prince of Nandun and Zong's brother Sima Yang (司馬羕) the Prince of Xiyang, all of whom were powerful during Emperor Ming's reign but who had been removed under Empress Dowager Yu's regency. (Note: The animosity between Yu Liang and the three men probably arose from Emperor Ming's final illness. In early October 325, Emperor Ming grew ill. During this final illness, Sima Zong (son of Sima Liang and brother of Sima Yang) and Yu Yin (younger brother of Lady Yu Mengmu, who was Emperor Yuan's wife and posthumously honoured as "Empress Yuanjing") held the keys to the palace where Emperor Ming was resting. One night, Yu Liang decided to seek an audience with the emperor; he then went to Sima Zong and asked for the keys to the palace gates. Sima refused, incurring Yu's wrath. At a later date, Yu pushed open the door to Emperor Ming's chambers. In tears, Yu claimed that Sima Yang and Sima Zong were plotting to dismiss court officials. Yu then requested that the emperor make him regent and dismiss Sima Zong, Sima Yang and Yu Yin; Emperor Ming refused.) In winter 326, Yu Liang accused Sima Zong of treason and killed him, demoted Sima Yang, and exiled Yu Yin. This led to the people losing confidence in him.

=== Capture, death and burial ===
In 327, Yu Liang further resolved on separating Su, then the governor of Liyang Commandery (歷陽, roughly modern Chaohu, Anhui) from his troops, and he promoted Su to minister of agriculture—a post that did not involve commanding troops. Su saw his intent and declared a rebellion in c.December, (Note: Vol 93 of Zizhi Tongjian and the annals of Emperor Cheng in Jin Shu both recorded that Su Jun and Zu Yue rebelled in the 11th month of the 2nd year of the Xianhe era; the month corresponds to 30 Nov to 30 Dec 327 in the Julian calendar.) with Zu's assistance. Yu Liang initially thought that Su could be easily defeated, but instead Su quickly arrived at the capital in early March 328 and captured it. Yu Liang was forced to flee. Meanwhile, Su granted himself and Zu various titles on 5 March 328 (Note: According to the annals of Emperor Cheng in Book of Jin and vol.94 of Zizhi Tongjian, Su Jun granted himself and Zu Yue the titles on the dingsi day of the 2nd month of the 3rd year of the Xianhe era of Emperor Cheng's reign; the date corresponds to 5 Mar 328 in the proleptic Gregorian calendar. Tongjian also added the observation that Su Jun also issued a general pardon on that day, but said pardon did not include Yu Liang and his brothers.) and allowed his troops to pillage the capital; it was said that even Empress Dowager Yu's servant girls became spoils for his troops. Further, it was said that Su himself "humiliated" Empress Dowager Yu— although the method of humiliation was not specified in history, it is believed that she was raped by the troops. Empress Dowager Yu died in distress and fear at the age of 32 (by East Asian reckoning). (Note: Vol.94 of Zizhi Tongjian only recorded that Lady Yu died in distress (以憂崩). However, the volume did record that Lady Yu's servant girls, along with other women of the harem, became spoils for Su's troops; this is similar to the record found in the annals of Emperor Cheng in Jin Shu. Tongjian also recorded that noblewomen were stripped naked; those who could found straw or hay from damaged mats to preserve their modesty. Those who couldn't find straw sat down and used earth from the ground to cover themselves.) Her son Emperor Cheng became Su's captive for months before other provincial generals converged on Jiankang and defeated Su. The empress dowager's body was eventually recovered and she was buried together with Emperor Ming at Wuping Mausoleum on 19 May 328.

== Notes ==
Chinese royalty
Preceded by Empress Liang Lanbi	Empress of Jin Dynasty (266–420); 323–326	Succeeded by Empress Du Lingyang
