= Su Jun =

Eastern Jin military general and politician (died Nov 328)

Su Jun (Chinese: 蘇峻), courtesy name Zigao (Chinese: 子高) (before 294 (Note: According to the chronology of Su Jun's biography in Book of Jin, he became a xiaolian at age 18 (by East Asian reckoning) before the Disaster of Yongjia, which took place in 311. Thus by calculation, his birth year should be before 294.) – 13 November 328 (Note: According to Emperor Cheng's biography in Book of Jin, Su Jun died on the gengwu day of the 9th month of the 3rd year of the Xianhe era of his reign; the date corresponds to 13 Nov 328 in the Julian calendar.)) was a Chinese military general and politician of the Jin Dynasty whose rebellion against Emperor Cheng's uncle and regent Yu Liang was initially successful, allowing him to take over the imperial government, but he was eventually defeated by Tao Kan's and Wen Jiao's forces and killed in battle. The disturbance he created greatly weakened the Jin regime, which for decades did not have any ability to fight back against rival Later Zhao.

== Life ==
Su Jun's father Su Mo (蘇模) was a prime minister of the Dukedom of Anle—the dukedom that was given to Liu Shan the last emperor of Shu Han and his descendants. Su himself was known for his intelligence when he was young. In the aftermath of Han-Zhao's capture of Emperor Huai during the Disaster of Yongjia in July 311, (Note: In his annotations to vol.34 of Sanguozhi, Pei Songzhi cited Sun Sheng's Shu Shi Pu, which recorded that most of Liu Bei's descendants, including the last Duke of Anle, died during the Disaster.) Su gathered a group of refugees on modern Shandong Peninsula and served as the leader of self-protection league. This eventually brought the attention of Cao Ni—a general with substantial forces in modern Shandong who frequently changed his allegiance between Han-Zhao and Jin, and after Cao could not persuade Su to join him, he became determined to destroy Su. Su became fearful, and in 319 he took his group of refugees south to join the Jin imperial regime under Emperor Yuan, then located at Jiankang. Emperor Yuan was impressed at how Su kept his group of refugees together and how he had come a long distance to join him, and he made Su a commandery governor. He went through a succession of posts the next few years.

In 324, when the warlord Wang Dun's forces attacked Jiankang, with intent to overthrow Emperor Yuan's successor Emperor Ming, Emperor Ming summoned Su, among other generals posted on the northern border with Later Zhao, to come to his aid. When Su's forces (and those of Liu Xia (劉遐)) arrived in the capital late at night, Emperor Ming personally went to visit the forces. Su was instrumental in subsequently defeating Wang's forces, preserving Jin. After this success, Su was made the governor of Liyang Commandery (歷陽, roughly modern Chaohu, Anhui). He became proud of his success and began to have greater ambition, and he received criminals and other unwanted people into his commandery, seeking to strengthen his own personal force.

In early October 325, Emperor Ming became gravely ill. During this final illness, Sima Zong (Note: brother of Sima Yang) and Yu Yin (younger brother of Lady Yu Mengmu (Note: Emperor Yuan's wife, posthumously honoured as "Empress Yuanjing".)) held the keys to the palace where Emperor Ming was resting. One night, Yu Liang decided to seek an audience with the emperor; he then went to Sima Zong and asked for the keys to the palace gates. Sima refused, incurring Yu's wrath. At a later date, Yu pushed open the door to Emperor Ming's chambers. In tears, Yu claimed that Sima Yang and Sima Zong were plotting to dismiss court officials. Yu then requested that the emperor make him regent and dismiss Sima Zong, Sima Yang and Yu Yin; Emperor Ming refused. After Emperor Ming's death later that month, his four-year-old son Emperor Cheng succeeded to the throne, and Cheng's maternal uncle Yu Liang became regent. In late November or early December 326, Yu Liang alienated public opinion (Note: Sima Zong and Sima Yang were cousins of Sima Jin (Emperor Yuan's father) and were thus regarded as elders of the clan, despite their relatively young age.) by falsely accusing Sima Zong of treason and killing him, and demoting Sima Yang to Prince of Yiyang County (弋阳县王). An associate of Sima Zong, Bian Chan (卞阐), fled and sought refuge with Su Jun; when Yu Liang demanded that Su surrender Bian, Su refused.

Thus, Yu became apprehensive of Su and became convinced that he had to strip Su of his military post. In 327, he announced that Su was being promoted to minister of agriculture—a post that did not involve any military commands. Su refused, and asked to be transferred to another commandery instead. Yu in turn refused and prepare for war. Su then declared a rebellion against Yu's regency in c.December, stating in a famous quote:

I would rather be on a hill and looking at the jail, rather than be in a jail and looking at the hill.

In other words, he would rather lose in battle and be executed, than to submit himself to what he thought was certain imprisonment. He allied himself with Zu Yue the governor of Yu Province (豫州, usually referring to modern eastern Henan, but by that point mostly confined to central Anhui), and headed for Jiankang.

Yu was confident he could defeat Su—so much so that he declined emergency assistance from Wen Jiao, who was then the governor of Jiang Province (江州, modern Jiangxi) -- but instead Su won battle after battle and reached Jiankang quickly, capturing the city in early March 328 (Note: According to Emperor Cheng's biography in Book of Jin, Su Jun occupied Jiankang on the bingchen day of the 2nd month of the 3rd year of the Xianhe era of his reign; the date corresponds to 4 Mar 328 in the proleptic Gregorian calendar.) and forcing Yu to flee with his brothers Yu Shuyu, Yu Tiao and Yu Yi. Su's forces pillaged the capital, stripping both officials and commoners of their wealths and even their clothing, and even the servant girls of Empress Dowager Yu, Emperor Cheng's mother, were seized. Empress Dowager Yu, in distress, died. (Note: It is said that she was "humiliated" by Su, but the method of humiliation was not described.) Su took over the imperial government and put his allies into high positions quickly.

However, Yu Liang, Wen, and Tao Kan soon entered into an alliance and headed back east to Jiankang. Eastern commanderies also rose against Su, led by Xi Jian. Despite these provincial forces having greater numbers, Su continued to defeat them in battle after battle, and even Wen and Tao, capable generals in their own right, became apprehensive. However, during one battle in November 328, Su was hit by a spear and fell off his horse, and the provincial forces quickly beheaded him. His forces tried to coalesce behind his brother Su Yi (蘇逸), but collapsed in early 329.
