= General and I =

- Promotional Poster
- Genre: Historical fiction Romance
- Based on: A Lonesome Fragrance Waiting to be Appreciated by Feng Nong
- Written by: Zhang Yongchen
- Directed by: Ju Jueliang
- Starring: Wallace Chung; Angelababy; Sun Yizhou; Gan Tingting
- Country of origin: China
- Original language: Mandarin
- No. of episodes: 62

Production
- Executive producer: Zhao Jianling
- Production companies: Croton Media; Send Joy Media; LeTV; Cornucopia Music

Original release
- Network: Hunan Television
- Release: 2 January – 10 February 2017

General and I (Chinese: 孤芳不自赏; pinyin: Gū Fāng Bú Zì Shǎng) is a 2017 Chinese television series based on Feng Nong's novel A Lonesome Fragrance Waiting to be Appreciated. Directed by Ju Jueliang and written by Zhang Yongchen, the series stars Wallace Chung, Angelababy, Sun Yizhou and Gan Tingting. General and I aired on Hunan Television from 2 January to 10 February 2017.

== Synopsis ==
When the mansion of Prince Jing'an is under attack and destroyed overnight, He Xia (Sun Yizhou) and his attendant Bai Pingting (Angelababy) are forced to flee the Kingdom of Yan. They get separated, and Pingting takes refuge in a monastery where she meets the powerful general Chu Beijie (Wallace Chung) of the Kingdom of Jin. He recognizes her as his childhood first love. However, their situation renders this relationship a difficult one as they are from opposing kingdoms.

== Cast ==
=== Main ===
- Wallace Chung as Chu Beijie
  - Prince Zhen Bei. A powerful general and genius military strategist; secret half-brother to the King of Jin. He loves Bai Pingting since their first encounter twenty years ago when she and her father saved him and his mother. He is very loyal to his country, causing him to be split between his responsibilities and love on various occasions.
- Angelababy as Bai Pingting
  - A genius military strategist who is a cherished playmate and loyal servant of He Xia. She is wanted by the rulers of many kingdoms because she knows by heart the teachings of a highly wanted military strategy book that her father forced her to recite before he died. Chu Beijie rescued her when she was on the run, and he recognized her by the hairpin he gave her when they were young. Though she was initially forced to marry Chu Beijie, she eventually fell in love with him.
- Sun Yizhou as He Xia
  - Son of Prince Jing'an. An ambitious noble who is intent on seeking revenge for his family after being betrayed by the royal household of Yan. He later took asylum in the Kingdom of Bai Lan and became the princess' consort in order to gain power. He only realizes at the very end that he fell for Yao Tian.
- Gan Tingting as Yao Tian
  - Princess of Bai Lan, and later He Xia's wife. Her love for her husband ultimately leads to the downfall of her kingdom, and she sacrifices herself and her unborn baby to allow He Xia to fulfill his ambitions.

=== Supporting ===
==== Jin kingdom ====
- Yu Bo as Sima Hong, Emperor of Jin. Chu Beijie's half-brother.
- Jin Qiaoqiao as Dowager Empress Ren De
  - Sima Hong's mother. The only person who knows the truth of Chu Beijie's identity.
- Shi Yuyan as Chu Yu
  - Chu Beijie's mother. She committed suicide to protect her son, and left him under the care of the Dowager Empress.
- Wang Ruizi as Empress
  - Empress of Jin. Sima Hong's first wife and true love. She dies after being suffocated by Royal Consort Zhang.
- Deng Sha as Zhang Yun'er
  - Royal Consort Zhang. Sima Hong's concubine. Daughter of the Prime Minister. She is in love with Chu Beijie, but was forced to marry Sima Hong due to political struggles. As a result, she bore vengeance in her heart and resorted to schemes to ruin both Chu Beijie and Sima Hong's life.
- Chen Haofeng as Chancellor Zhang
  - Consort Zhang's father. An evil, scheming and power-hungry person. He sacrificed his daughter's happiness in order to attain the throne. After failing to steal the throne, he committed suicide.
- Lu Qing as Shuang'er
  - A palace maid who stayed by Sima Hong during the times he was imprisoned within the palace. She later becomes the second Empress of Jin.
- Cheng Haofeng as Zhang Wenzheng
- Zhu Jianyun as Xie Heng, Prime Minister/Grand Marshal of Jin state.
- Wei Binghua as Chu Moran, Chu Beijie's trusted lieutenant who likes Zui Ju.
- Cui Mingyang as Mu Lan, Chu Beijie's subordinate.
- Zhang Yun as Chen Mu, General of Jin.
- Zhang Jiao as He Xiang, Consort Zhang's maid.
- Yu Xiaofan as Madame Hua
- Miao Haizhong as Mister Hua
- Leo Li as Miss Hua
- Liao Songmei as Nanny Chen

==== Liang kingdom ====
- Wang Ce as King of Liang, King of Liang state.
- Qi Hang as Ze Yin, Famous general of Liang. Yang Feng's husband.
- Madina Memet as Yang Feng, Bai Pingting's childhood best friend, known as the "Two Qins of Jingan". Ze Yin's wife.
- Liu Mengmeng as Thirteenth Lady Yan, Lady Boss of Jiao Yan Lou. She is Chu Beijie's long-time strategic confidante, and is in love with him.
- Gu Minghan as Ruo Han, General of Liang state and trusted lieutenant of Ze Yin.
- Wang Tianze as Ze Qing, Ze Yin and Yang Feng's son.
- Qu Musen as Mu Yan

==== Yan kingdom ====
- Wang Zizi as Queen of Yan
- Yu Rongguang as He Sheng, Prince of Jingan Manor. He Xia's father.
- Wan Meixi as Murong Heren, Grand Princess of Yan. He Xia's mother, He Sheng's wife.
- Hu Wenzuo as Dong Zhuo, Bai Pingting and He Xia's childhood friend, and loyal assistant of He Xia. He has a kind heart.
- Sun Wei as Lu Ke, General of Yan.

==== Bai Lan kingdom ====
- Li Haohan as Gui Changqing, Prime Minister of Bai Lan. Gui Yan's father.
- Song Wenzuo as Gui Yan, General of Bai Lan. Gui Changqing's son. He is in love with Yao Tian.
- Wang Tianchen as Fan Lu, a mercenary tasked to kill Bai Pingting. However, he mistook Zui Ju to be Pingting, and took her hostage. He later falls in love with Zui Ju.
- Ma Chengcheng as Feng Yin, God-daughter of Gui Changqing. He Xia's concubine, positioned by Yao Tian.
- Mu Le'en as Lu Yi, Yao Tian's maid.
- Lu Yong as Qi Tian, General in Bai Lan who is in charge of Yongtai troops and later approached by Chu Beijie.

==== Others ====
- Zou Yang as Zui Ju
  - A highly skilled healer who saves Bai Pingting and later becomes her best and most loyal companion. Huo Hainan's disciple. She had a crush on Chu Beijie, but later falls for Fan Lu.
- Chen Dacheng as Huo Hainan, Zui Ju's teacher. A skilled royal physician in the palace.
- Li Qingyu as Chu Changxiao, Chu Beijie and Bai Pingting's son.
- Li Jinrong as Bai Hefu, Bai Pingting's father.

== Soundtrack ==
No.	Title	Lyrics	Music	Singer	Length
1.	"A Lonesome Fragrance (孤芳不自赏)" (Theme song)	Zhao Jianping	Tan Xuan	Henry Huo
2.	"A Lone Flower (一支孤芳)"	Zhang Mengwan	Chen Zhongyi	Wallace Chung
3.	"The Scene Before (眼前)"	Zhou Jieying	Tan Xuan	Tan Jing
4.	"A Familiar Scenery (風景舊曾諳)"	Liu Chang	Tan Xuan	William Wei & Claire Kuo
5.	"Won't Disappoint (不負)"	Li Xueman	Tan Xuan	Zhou Pin
6.	"Tower of Tears (淚塔)"	Zheng Nan, Jin Fang	Tan Xuan	Fang Yuan

== Production ==
The drama was filmed from April to September 2016 in several locations, such as Beijing, Inner Mongolia, Yinchuan, Yunnan, Xiangshan and Hengdian World Studios.

== Reception ==
The drama is a commercial success in China, achieving high ratings and surpassing 16 billion views. It ranked 1st place on the list of Most Profitable Dramas of 2017.

Despite its popularity, the drama received some criticisms for its production quality. The majority of the scenes used computer-generated imagery (CGI). However, the special effects were criticized of poor quality. The director Ju explained that the purpose of using CGI is to enhance the visual effect of the drama. He admitted the imperfect and said that time constraint for post-production is a factor.

=== Ratings ===
CSM52 city network ratings					National Internet ratings		
Air date	Episode	Ratings (%)	Audience share (%)	Rank	Ratings (%)	Audience share (%)	Rank
January 2, 2017	01	1.303	3.965	1	1.34	4.52	1
January 3, 2017	02-03	1.214	3.683	1	1.46	4.78	1
January 4, 2017	04-05	1.269	3.871	1	1.53	4.95	1
January 5, 2017	06-07	1.221	3.66	1	1.68	5.37	1
January 6, 2017	08	0.981	2.806	2	1.183	3.449	1
January 7, 2017	09	1.067	3.047	1	1.261	3.643	1
January 8, 2017	10-11	1.163	3.341	1	1.256	3.835	1
January 9, 2017	12-13	1.341	4.019	1	1.575	4.98	1
January 10, 2017	14-15	1.289	3.806	1	1.459	4.625	1
January 11, 2017	16-17	1.297	3.825	2	1.57	4.808	1
January 12, 2017	18-19	1.315	3.797	2	1.599	4.814	1
January 13, 2017	20	0.910	2.672	2	1.237	3.563	1
January 14, 2017	21	1.016	2.973	2	1.303	3.804	1
January 15, 2017	22	0.985	2.806	3	1.23	3.57	1
January 16, 2017	23-24	1.238	3.591	2	1.658	5.039	1
January 17, 2017	25-26	1.352	3.993	2	1.768	5.365	1
January 18, 2017	27-28	1.571	4.592	1	2.108	6.391	1
January 19, 2017	29	1.005	2.874	4	1.347	3.895	2
January 21, 2017	30	1.055	3.123	2	1.382	4.089	1
January 22, 2017	31	0.961	2.85	3	1.306	3.836	2
January 23, 2017	32-33	1.430	4.297	1	1.976	5.797	2
January 24, 2017	34-35	1.297	3.806	3	1.818	5.378	2
January 25, 2017	36-37	1.306	3.808	2	1.811	5.43	1
January 26, 2017	38-39	1.435	4.136	1	1.906	5.608	1
January 27, 2017	40	0.807	2.392	1	1.199	3.2	1
January 28, 2017	41	1.079	3.340	1	1.837	5.387	1
January 29, 2017	42	0.948	3.190	2	1.322	4.304	2
January 30, 2017	43	0.801	2.634	1	1.094	3.555	1
January 31, 2017	44-45	1.023	3.292	1	1.789	5.702	1
February 1, 2017	46-47	1.071	3.296	1	1.721	5.355	1
February 2, 2017	48-49	1.395	4.199	1	1.917	5.951	1
February 3, 2017	50	1.208	3.476	1	1.549	4.628	1
February 4, 2017	51	1.244	3.649	1	1.672	5.084	1
February 5, 2017	52-53	1.668	4.731	1	2.18	6.533	1
February 6, 2017	54-55	1.676	4.756	1	2.268	6.625	1
February 7, 2017	56-57	1.719	4.746	1	2.405	6.855	1
February 8, 2017	58-59	1.707	4.721	1	2.288	6.665	1
February 9, 2017	60-61	1.723	4.844	1	2.401	6.965	1
February 10, 2017	62	1.609	4.518	1	2.379	6.75	1
Average ratings	-	1.314	3.863	1	-	-	1

== International broadcast ==
- Malaysia - 8TV (Malaysia) - 8 May 2017
- Malaysia - ntv7 - 29 October 2019
- Singapore, Malaysia, Indonesia, Philippines and Thailand- Sony One (Coming Soon)
- Cambodia - PPCTV 6HD (Cambodia) - 30 April 2019
- Thailand - Channel 3 Thailand - 27 April 2020
- Philippines - Heart of Asia Channel - 2023
