= He Fani =

He Fani 何法倪

Empress consort of the Eastern Jin dynasty
- Tenure: 19 September 357 – 29 October 361
- Predecessor: Empress Chu Suanzi
- Successor: Empress Wang Muzhi
- Born: 339
- Died: 13 September 404 (aged 64–65); Jiankang, Eastern Jin
- Spouse: Emperor Mu of Jin
Posthumous name
- Empress Muzhang (穆章皇后); Empress Yong'an (永安皇后)
- Father: He Zhun
- Mother: Lady Kong

Empress He Fani (Chinese: 何法倪; 339 – 13 September 404), formally Empress Muzhang (穆章皇后, literally "the solemn and polite empress"), semi-formally Empress Yong'an (永安皇后), was an empress of the Eastern Jin dynasty. Her husband was Emperor Mu.

== Life ==
He Fani's father He Zhun (何準) was a brother of the one-time prime minister He Chong (Note: Per He Chong's biography in Book of Jin, his wife was a younger sister of Emperors Cheng's and Kang's mother Yu Wenjun.) (何充), who was an important official during the reigns of Emperor Cheng, Emperor Kang, and Emperor Mu. Both He Zhun and He Chong had already died by 357, when, based on the account of her high birth, He Fani was selected to be the empress on 19 September. (Note: As Lady He's father was already deceased, the edict was issued to her father's cousin He Qi (何琦), as the head of the household.) Emperor Mu was 14 and she was 18.

Emperor Mu did not have any sons, with Empress He or any of his concubines. After he died in July 361, he was succeeded by his cousin Emperor Ai (son of Emperor Cheng), and Empress He was not given the title of empress dowager but instead was honored as Empress Mu. As she was given Yong'an Palace (永安宮) as her residence, she also became known as Empress Yong'an.

Little is known about her life during the reigns of Emperor Ai, his brother Emperor Fei, their granduncle Emperor Jianwen, or Emperor Jianwen's son Emperor Xiaowu. When the warlord Huan Xuan (Huan Wen's son) usurped the throne from Emperor Xiaowu's son Emperor An in 403, she was still alive, and as she was forced to move from Yong'an Palace (Note: vacated to serve as Emperor An's residence as he had been demoted to Prince of Pinggu), her procession went past the imperial temples, and she cried bitterly at the sight of the temples. Huan Xuan became displeased and, instead of honoring her as a princess dowager as would be expected, he created her only as the Lady of Lingling. Subsequently, when Liu Yu started an uprising in 404 to restore Emperor An, Huan had her and Emperor An both transported west. But, on the way, Huan Xuan's brother-in-law Yin Zhongwen (殷仲文) turned against him and escorted both her and Emperor An's empress Wang Shen'ai back to the capital Jiankang. She was said to have then ordered that her regular supplies be reduced in light of the warfare that the people had just suffered. She died later that year and was buried with imperial honors with her husband Emperor Mu, whom she outlived by 43 years.

== Notes ==
Chinese royalty
Preceded by Empress Chu Suanzi	Empress of Jin Dynasty (266–420); 357–361	Succeeded by Empress Wang Muzhi
Preceded by Empress Chu Suanzi	Empress of China (Southeastern); 357–361	Succeeded by Empress Wang Muzhi
Preceded by Empress Li of Cheng Han	Empress of China (Southwestern); 357–361	Succeeded by Empress Wang Muzhi
Preceded by Empress Dong of Ran Wei	Empress of China (Central); 357–361	Succeeded by Empress Wang Muzhi
