= Yongshi =

Yongshi (永始) was a Chinese era name used by several emperors of China. It may refer to:

- Yongshi (16BC–13BC), era name used by Emperor Cheng of Han
- Yongshi (403–404), era name used by Huan Xuan
