= Xun Xian =

Chinese Jin dynasty general (322–359)

- 荀羨

Inspector of Xuzhou (徐州刺史)
- In office 350 – 359
- Monarch: Emperor Mu of Jin

Personal details
- Born: 322
- Died: 359
- Relations: Xun Guan (sister); Xun Rui (brother); Xun Yu (ancestor)
- Children: Xun Yi
- Parent: Xun Song (father)
- Occupation: Military general
- Courtesy name: Lingze (令則)

Xun Xian (322–359), courtesy name Lingze, was a Chinese military general of the Jin dynasty (266–420).

== Life ==
=== Early life and career ===
Xun Xian was the son of Xun Song (263?-329?) and the younger brother of the heroine Xun Guan; they were descendants of Xun Yu. Xun Xian was born late in Xun Song's life, when the latter was about 60 years old. In 328, at the age of seven (by East Asian reckoning), he was living in Jiankang when the Jin rebel Su Jun captured the capital along with Emperor Cheng. When Su Jun fell back to Shitou, Xun Song followed, bringing along Xun Xian. Su Jun took a liking for Xun Xian and usually allowed him to sit on his lap. However, this feeling was not mutual. One time, Xun Xian said to his mother, "A knife should be enough to kill this thief." His mother panicked and quickly closed his mouth, telling him not to speak such things aloud. Xun Song, already in poor health when Su Jun's rebellion was put down in early 329, died soon after.

At the age of 15 (by East Asian reckoning), he was chosen to marry Princess Xunyang (尋陽公主), the daughter of the late Emperor Yuan of Jin. However, Xun Xian was not interested and ran far away to avoid the marriage. The officials that monitored him caught up to him and brought him back to be forced to wed with the princess. As he reached adulthood, he was as famous as the calligrapher Wang Qia (son of Wang Dao and father of Wang Xun), and even befriended the likes of Liu Tan, Wang Meng (father of Wang Muzhi) and Yin Hao.

Xun Xian went on to serve in the Court of the Palace Library, and held the offices of Prefect of Yixing and Chu Pou's Chief Clerk. In 348, his friend Yin Hao became Inspector of Yangzhou, competing with his court rival Huan Wen. Yin Hao was quick to recruit Xun Xian as his General Who Establishes Might and Interior Minister of Wu together with Wang Xizhi. When Chu Pou died in 349, Xun Xian, through the help of Yin Hao, succeeded his rule as Inspector of Xuzhou, becoming the youngest person to hold the office of inspector in Eastern Jin at the age of 28 (by East Asian age reckoning).

In 350, Xun Xian was involved in an affair between the Jin court and the prominent minister, Cai Mo. Cai Mo had repeatedly avoided his position of Minister Over the Masses and even feigned illness to do so. A petition to punished him drew him out to court, where Yin Hao was advocating for his execution. Coincidentally, Xun Xian arrived at court just as the issue was going on, so Yin Hao asked for his opinion. Xun Xian believed that by pushing for his execution and putting his life in danger, Cai Mo may rebel and cause a bigger issue due to his influence. Thus, Yin Hao decided to stop calling for his death, although he was reduced to a commoner in the end.

=== Northern expeditions ===
Xun Xian accompanied Yin Hao in his northern expedition in 352 together with Xie Shang. The warlord Zhang Yu (張遇) had originally surrendered Xuchang to Jin, but as Xie Shang failed to win him over, so Zhang Yu seized back the city and also took Luoyang. Yin Hao withdrew and had Xun Xian defend Huaiyin. Following this campaign, Xun Xian became Chief of military affairs in Qingzhou and acting Inspector of Yanzhou.

In 356, the Duan Kan's state of Qi was on the verge of collapse by Former Yan forces. Duan Kan called Jin for aid, so the court sent Xun Xian to rescue him. Xun Xian camped at Langye, where he refused to advance as he feared the Yan forces' strength. He attacked the Yan general, Wang Teng at (王騰) Yangdu (陽都, in present-day Linyi, Shandong), where he captured and executed him. After Duan Kan had been defeated, Xun Xian withdrew back to Xiapi, leaving behind his generals to defend the borders. When Yan general Murong Lan (慕容蘭) camped at Biancheng (汴城, in modern Kaifeng, Henan), Xun Xian routed and killed him.

In 358, Xun Xian grew ill, so he had Chi Tan (郗曇; son of Xi Jian) to serve as his director of the Army. The same year, Yan once again provoked him by camping Jia Jian at Shanshi (山茌, in modern Changqing District, Shandong). Xun Xian immediately led out his troops to fight and, Jia Jian found himself greatly outnumbering him. In spite of this, Jia charged out with all 700 of his men to attack rather than defend, killing many of Xun's soldiers. Xun Xian was only able to get the upper hand after surrounding his entire city, and later managed to seize him following days of intense battle. Xun Xian offered him to go back to Jin, but Jia Jian refused. After persuading him numerous time, Jia Jian insulted him, thus angering Xun Xian. Xun Xian had him tied up and exposed to the rain. Days later, Jia Jian died. Xun Xian did not hold Shanshi for long, as Yue Ming (悅明) defeated him and retook the city for Yan.

=== Death ===
After failing to secure Shanshi, Xun Xian's illness grew worse. The court recalled him and had his positions given to Chi Tan. Xun Xian died the following year at the young age of 38 (by East Asian reckoning). He was posthumously appointed General of Agile Cavalry; his death and that of Wang Qia's were lamented by Emperor Mu of Jin.
