= Yang Quanqi =

Chinese Eastern Jin dynasty military general (died 400)

- 楊佺期

Inspector of Yong province (雍州刺史)
- In office 398 – 399
- Monarch: Emperor An of Jin

Personal details
- Born: Unknown Huayin, Shaanxi
- Died: c.January 400
- Relations: Yang Guang (elder brother); Yang Siping (younger brother; died c. December 408)
- Parent: Yang Liang (father)

Yang Quanqi (died c.January 400) was a military general of the Jin dynasty (266–420). He was a border commander who fought several battles against the northern barbarian states following the Battle of Fei River in 383, and later became a chief general for the Inspector of Jing province, Yin Zhongkan during Wang Gong's insurrections against Emperor An of Jin's regent, Sima Daozi. As part of the appeasement plan for the insurrectionists, the imperial court appointed Yang the Inspector of Yong province with the aim of sowing discord between him, Yin and the Inspector of Jiang province, Huan Xuan. Yin became suspicious of Yang and repeatedly turned down his suggestions to strike at Huan first. In the end, Yang Quanqi was captured and executed after he attempted to relieve Yin Zhongkan at Jiangling from Huan Xuan's forces.

== Background ==
Born into the famous Yang clan of Hongnong, Yang Quanqi was a descendant of the Grand Tutor of the Eastern Han dynasty, Yang Zhen (楊震). For seven generations, his lineage from Yang Zhen to his great-grandfather, the Western Jin Minister of Ceremonies Yang Zhun (楊準), were all respected for their virtue and reputation. However, his grandfather, Yang Lin (楊林), perished during the fall of Western Jin, while his father, Yang Liang found himself serving under the Jie-led Later Zhao dynasty. The Later Zhao also fell in 351, and Yang Liang followed the Qiang warlord, Yao Xiang before he surrendered to the Eastern Jin commander, Huan Wen in 356. As an Eastern Jin commander, Yang Liang fought in several campaigns against the Former Qin dynasty and reached the rank of Inspector of Liang province.

Yang Quanqi was described as brave and resolute, while his elder brother, Yang Guang (楊廣) and younger brother, Yang Siping (楊思平) were both strong but crude. He was especially proud of his family background, believing he had inherited his ancestors' prestigious mantle which no one in the Jiangnan could match. Yet, he was always left dejected whenever people compare his background to Wang Xun from the more influential Wang clan of Langya. Many of the southern clans thought that he and his family were unbefitting of their family name, as they had cross the Yangtze river too late to form marriage alliances and attain officialdom. As a result, they were often held back by the ruling elites, which made Yang Quanqi indignant and desperate to prove his worth.

== Campaigns in the north ==
In 384, following the Battle of Fei River, Yang Quanqi participated in the Eastern Jin's efforts to reclaim lost territory from the collapsing Former Qin. He first camped at Chenggu, where he then led his men to rout the Qin's Inspector of Liang province, Pan Meng (潘猛) at Kanghui Fortress (康回壘). For his merits, he was appointed General of Broad Might and Administrator of Henan, and was ordered to camp at Luoyang. In 391, when the Western Yan ruler, Murong Yong invaded Henan, Yang fought and drove him away.

In 392, the Former Qin general, Dou Chong, attacked the Jin Administrator of Pingyang at Huangtian Fortress (皇天塢), but Yang brought his forces to Hucheng (湖城; in present-day Lingbao City, Henan) and repelled him. In 393, a leader of the Di people under Jin, Yang Fusong, rebelled in the Shu region and brought his followers north to join the Later Qin dynasty. Yang Quanqi and his fellow general, Zhao Mu (趙睦) marched from Hucheng and entered Tong Pass to intercept him. Yang Fusong was defeated, and Yang Quanqi received the surrender of 900 households. However, the Later Qin general, Yao Chong soon arrived to reinforce Yang Fusong and dealt the Jin forces a heavy defeat. Zhao Mu was killed, while Yang Quanqi returned to Luoyang, after which he was promoted to Dragon-prancing General.

== Wang Gong's insurrections ==
=== Wang Gong's first insurrection ===
Due to an illness, Yang Quanqi was reassigned to Administrator of Xinye while concurrently serving as Marshal Who Establishes Might. He was later promoted to Administrator of Tangyi and Chief Controller of military affairs in Shitou, but had to resign due to another bout of illness.

In 397, the conflict between the Inspector of Yan and Qing provinces, Wang Gong and Emperor An of Jin's regent, Sima Daozi reached a breaking point as Wang planned to march onto the capital, Jiankang and depose the regent's corrupt associate, Wang Guobao. The Inspector of Jing province, Yin Zhongkan agreed to join forces with Wang, but he was worried that the Chancellor of Nan Commandery, Jiang Ji (江績) will object to their plans. To prevent any interference, Yin appointed Yang Quanqi as a Marshal and had him replace Jiang Ji in his position. After Yin completed his military preparations, he sent Yang to camp at Baling, but by then, Sima Daozi had already executed Wang Guobao and reached a compromise with Wang Gong, so Yang soon withdrew.

=== Wang Gong's second insurrection ===
In 398, Yin Zhongkan and the Inspector of Guang province, Huan Xuan allied with Wang Gong and the Inspector of Yu province, Yu Kai to once again force Sima Daozi into removing his corrupt associates. As Yin lacked experience as a field commander, he entrusted all military affairs to Yang Quanqi and his brothers, ordering him to lead the vanguard with 5,000 soldiers on boats and Huan Xuan following from behind. They first arrived at Penkou (湓口; in present-day Jiujiang, Jiangxi), where they scared away the Inspector of Jiang province Wang Yu (王愉), before arriving at Hengjiang (橫江; southeast of present-day He County, Anhui) and forcing the imperial army to retreat.

However, by the time they reached Shitou, Yu Kai had been defeated, and Wang Gong was assassinated by his veteran general, Liu Laozhi. Yang, Huan and the others sent petitions demanding justice for Wang and for Liu Laozhi's execution, but when the elite Beifu Army under Liu arrived at Xinting (新亭; south of present-day Jiangning, Jiangsu), Yang and Huan withdrew back to Caizhou (蔡洲; southwest of present-day Nanjing, Jiangsu) in panic. At the same time, the imperial court was unsure of the true situtation among the rebels and was just as afraid of their strength. The court decided to appease Yang and Huan; Yang Quanqi in particular was offered the positions of Chief Controller of military affairs in the provinces of Liang, Yong and Qin and Inspector of Yong province, both which were held by the official, Xi Hui. At the same time, they also had Yin Zhongkan demoted from Inspector of Jing.

Yang Quanqi and Huan Xuan were happy with their new titles and considered turning back, but Yin, angered by his demotion, threatened to kill their entire families if they did so. The three men coalesced at Xunyang, where they publicly swore an oath to ignore the court's order and bring justice for Wang Gong. Hence, the imperial court was left with no choice but to reinstate Yin Zhongkan while allowing Huan Xuan and Yang Quanqi to retain their new offices. Satisfied, the three returned to their respective outposts with their armies.

== As Inspector of Yong province ==
=== Replacing Xi Hui ===
While the new arrangements were yet to take effect, the Inspector of Yong, Xi Hui was reluctant to give up his position, though he was unsure if either Yang Quanqi or Huan Xuan was coming to replace him. He and his men were willing to fight against Yang, but feared that Huan would be too difficult for them. Once he learnt that Yang was coming, he conspired with the Administrator of Nanyang, Lü Qiuxian (閭丘羨) to raise an army to resist him. Yang knew that Xi would cause trouble for him, so he spread a rumour that Huan Xuan was entering the Mian river with Yang as his vanguard. Xi's soldiers believed it and lost morale, throwing his army into disarray as many of them asked to surrender. Soon, Yang entered the government headquarters, executed Lü Qiuxian and sent Xi Hui to the capital. He comforted and drilled the soldiers, provided relief for the people and repaired the city walls, thereby winning their support.

=== Conflict with Yin Zhongkan and Huan Xuan ===
Yang Quanqi, Huan Xuan and Yin Zhongkan maintained an uneasy military alliance in the central Yangtze region, as deep down they despised and suspected one another. Yang especially hated Huan, who looked down him due to his relatively poor family background, so he and Yin secretly agreed to support one another. Yet, Yin also suspected Yang and his brothers, and was worried that having them eliminate Huan would make them too powerful, so despite Yang's repeated suggestions to attack Huan, he would always refuse.

In 399, the Jin city of Luoyang was placed under siege by the Later Qin dynasty. The Administrator of Henan, Xin Gongjing (辛恭靖) fiercely defended the city while Yang Quanqi sent an envoy to the Northern Wei for reinforcements. The Wei sent their own envoy, Zhang Ji (張濟) to visit Yang, who admitted to Zhang that he did not have the soldiers and supplies to launch a counterattack. He gave the Northern Wei full command over the relief mission and even permitted them to take Luoyang for themselves in case the city fell before they arrived. However, not only was Luoyang soon lost to Later Qin, the Northern Wei decided not to pursue any further and garrisoned at Yewang instead.

Later that year, Huan Xuan submitted a request to the court to expand his area of command. The court, sensing an opportunity to sow discord among the three allies, agreed and ceded four commaderies from Yin Zhongkan to him as well as appointed his brother, Huan Wei (桓偉) as Colonel of the Southern Man to replace Yang Quanqi's brother, Yang Guang. Yang Quanqi was provoked and ordered his soldiers to prepare for war. He claimed that he had intentions to march north to reinforce Luoyang, but in reality he was planning to carry out a surprise attack on Huan Xuan with Yin Zhongkan. However, Yin could not dispel his suspicion of Yang, so he forbade him from continuing any further, even sending his cousin, Yin Yu (殷遹) to the north to block his path. As Yang did not have enough troops to challenge Huan Xuan on his own, he disbanded and returned.

=== Death ===
Not long after, flooding broke out in Yin Zhongkan's territory and he was forced to open up the granaries to feed his people. Huan Xuan took advantage of the situation and led his troops to attack Yin's base in Jiangling, defeating his forces along the way. The people of Jiangling were too starved to fight back, so Yin desperately asked Yang for reinforcements. Yang told him that since Jiangling had no food, he should flee the city and hold out at his base in Xiangyang together. Not wanting to abandon his territory, Yin lied to Yang that he had recently found just enough food from his territory to replenish his supplies.

Yang took Yin at his word and brought 8,000 troops to Jiangling wearing his finest armour. When Yang arrived, he realized that Yin had lied as he was only offered a meagre amount of rice. Angrily, he exclaimed, "We have already lost!" and refused to meet Yin. At the time, Huan Xuan was camped at Lingkou (零口; near Jiangling), so he and Yang Guang went out to attack him for a decisive battle. Huan fell back to Matou (馬頭; northeast of Gong'an County, Hubei), and the next day, Yang launched a heavy attack on Huan's general, Guo Quan (郭銓) and nearly captured him. However, Huan Xuan's reinforcements soon arrived and destroyed Yang's army.

Yang fled on a lone horse back to Xiangyang, but he was pursued and captured by another general of Huan Xuan, Feng Gai. He and Yang Guang were executed, and their heads sent to Jiankang. Yang Siping and his cousins were able to escape and found refuge among the Southern Man tribes. Yin Zhongkan was also captured and forced to commit suicide.
