= Li Lingrong =

Li Lingrong 李陵容

Grand empress dowager of the Eastern Jin dynasty
- Tenure: 29 April 397 – 9 August 400

Empress dowager of the Eastern Jin dynasty
- Tenure: 27 September 394 – 29 April 397
- Predecessor: Chu Suanzi

Consort dowager (皇太妃)
- Tenure: 6 May 387 – 27 September 394
- Born: 351
- Died: 9 August 400 (aged 48–49); Jiankang, Eastern Jin
- Spouse: Emperor Jianwen of Jin
- Issue: Emperor Xiaowu of Jin; Sima Daozi; Princess Poyang (鄱陽公主; fl.370s - 403)

Li Lingrong (Chinese: 李陵容; pinyin: Lǐ Língróng; 351 (Note: According to Record of Jiankang, Lady Li was 50 (by East Asian reckoning) when she died. Thus by calculation, her birth year should be 351.) – 9 August 400 (Note: According to Sima Dezong's biography in Book of Jin, Lady Li died on the renzi day of the 7th month of the 4th year of the Longan era of Dezong's reign. This corresponds to 9 Aug 400 in the proleptic Gregorian calendar.)), posthumous name Empress Dowager Xiaowuwen (Chinese: 孝武文太后; pinyin: Xiàowǔwén Tàihòu; lit. 'the filial', 'martial', 'and civil empress dowager') was an empress dowager of the Eastern Jin dynasty of China. She was a concubine of Emperor Jianwen and the mother of Emperor Xiaowu.

== Life ==
Li Lingrong was born of a humble origin, and she became a servant girl in the household of Sima Yu the Prince of Kuaiji. She was one of the servants involved with manufacturing textiles.

=== Concubine ===
Sima Yu originally had a wife from high birth, Princess Wang Jianji (王簡姬). (Note: Lady Wang was from the Wang clan of Taiyuan; her father Wang Xia (王遐) was a generation removed from Wang Chang's great-grandson Wang Shu. Wang Xia was probably a cousin of Wang Shu's father Wang Cheng (also known as Wang Donghai).) With her he fathered his heir apparent, Sima Daosheng (司馬道生), and Sima Yusheng (司馬俞生). However, Sima Daosheng was described as careless and frivolous. In 348, while Sima Yu was prime minister for his grandnephew Emperor Mu, Sima Daosheng was accused of unspecified crimes. He was deposed and died in imprisonment, while Princess Wang died in distress. Sima Yusheng and three other sons of Sima Yu all died early, leaving him without an heir, and his concubines were not conceiving any more. He hired a practitioner of physiognomy to look at his concubines and see which one could conceive an heir. The practitioner looked at all of them and opined that none was destined to give him an heir—but then he saw Li Lingrong, who was tall, dark-skinned and who was derogatorily referred to as "Kunlun". The practitioner, in surprise, yelled out, "She is the one!" Sima Yu therefore took her as a concubine, and they had two sons—Sima Yao in 362 and Sima Daozi in 363. (Note: If the record in Jiankang Shilu was correct, Lady Li was 11 and 12 respectively when her sons were born.) Sima Yao was subsequently named heir apparent. She also had a daughter with Sima Yu, who would later be Princess Poyang.

=== Empress dowager ===
In 371, the paramount general Huan Wen, in order to showcase his power, deposed Sima Yu's nephew Emperor Fei and replaced him with Sima Yu (as Emperor Jianwen). Emperor Jianwen only ruled for about eight months, dying in September 372. He did not create her any special titles, but he did create her son Sima Yao crown prince. Sima Yao, after Emperor Jianwen's death, ascended the throne as Emperor Xiaowu. Initially, out of respect for his father's deceased wife Princess Wang (Note: Princess Wang was posthumously honored as Empress Shun on 6 Nov 372; Lady Li was made shufei on the same day.) and for Empress Dowager Chu, (Note: mother of Emperor Mu of Jin and empress dowager since his reign) he did not honor Consort Li as empress dowager, but did progressively honor her with greater and greater imperial consort titles. In May 387, (Note: Chu Suanzi died in July 384.) he honored her as Consort Dowager (皇太妃), with all ceremonial trappings of an empress dowager. In September 394, after a petition by Sima Daozi (Note: now the Prince of Kuaiji), she was finally honored as empress dowager.

Lady Li's influence during Emperor Xiaowu's reign appeared to be limited, as Empress Dowager Chu was regent early, and after she gave up regent authorities in 376, power was largely in the hands of Xie An until Emperor Xiaowu fully turned adult. She was described as often mediating conflicts between him and Sima Daozi, and throughout his reign, Sima Daozi had great authority as the emperor's brother and prime minister.

=== Grand empress dowager ===
Emperor Xiaowu was killed by his concubine Honoured Lady Zhang in November 396 after humiliating her. He was succeeded by his developmentally disabled son Emperor An, and Empress Dowager Li was honored as grand empress dowager on 29 April 397. (Note: According to Sima Dezong's biography in Book of Jin, Lady Li was made grand empress dowager on the jiayin day of the 2th month of the 1st year of the Longan era of Dezong's reign. However, in the same line, it was recorded that Lady Wang was made empress on the wuwu day of the same month. The two days do not exist in the 2nd month of the 1st year of the Longan era, but do exist in the 3rd month of the same year. Thus, the (likely) correct date for Lady Li receiving the title corresponds to 29 Apr 397 in the proleptic Gregorian calendar. Vol.109 of Zizhi Tongjian dated the event to the jiayin day of the 3rd month of the 1st year of the Longan era.) She died on 9 Aug 400 and was mourned with ceremony due an empress, but was not buried with Emperor Jianwen or worshipped with him in his temple, but instead was worshipped in the same temple that housed Emperor Jianwen's mother, Consort Zheng Achun (鄭阿春).

== Descendants ==
Through her daughter Princess Poyang, Li Lingrong was a great-grandmother of Wang Xianyuan.
