= Liu Laozhi =

Chinese Jin dynasty military general (died 402)

- 劉牢之

General Who Guards the North (鎮北將軍)
- In office 400 – 402
- Monarch: Emperor An of Jin

Personal details
- Born: 4th century CE (Note: As Liu Laozhi's son was born in 371, his birth year should be 358 or before.) Xuzhou, Jiangsu
- Died: April or May 402
- Children: Liu Jingxuan (371 - 26 May 415) (Note: The annals of Emperor An in Jin Shu, and vol.117 of Zizhi Tongjian recorded that Liu Jingxuan was assassinated on the yimao day of the 4th month of the 11th year of the Yixi era. Liu's biography in Song Shu recorded that he was 45 (by East Asian reckoning) when he died.); Lady Liu (wife of Gao Yazhi [高雅之]) (Note: Wang Gong's biography in Jin Shu recorded that Gao Yazhi was Liu's son-in-law.)
- Parent: Liu Jian (father)
- Courtesy name: Daojian (道堅)

Liu Laozhi (died April or May 402), courtesy name Daojian, was a military general of the Jin dynasty (266–420). He was one of the earliest and most distinguished recruits of the elite Beifu Army (北府兵; "Northern Headquarters Army"), founded by the border commander Xie Xuan in his war against the Former Qin dynasty. Liu Laozhi played a pivotal part in the Jin's decisive victory over the Former Qin at the Battle of Fei River, and subsequently followed Xie Xuan in his northern expedition to reclaim lost territory in the wake of the Qin's collapse in northern China. He was then trusted with defending the northern border, but after an incident where he failed to provide reinforcements for his ally, he was stripped of his office for cowardice in 394.

Following the ascension of Emperor An of Jin in 396, Liu Laozhi was welcomed back to the military by the commander, Wang Gong, who wanted to campaign against the emperor's corrupt regent, Sima Daozi. During the second insurrection in 398, he betrayed and turned Wang over to the imperial court, who rewarded him with Wang's high-ranking positions and command over the Beifu Army. When Sun En's rebellion broke out in 399, Liu was given a commanding role in suppressing the rebels and became the empire's most trusted top general. However, when the imperial court campaigned against the rebellious Inspector of Jing province, Huan Xuan, Liu Laozhi defected once more and allowed Huan to overwhelm the imperial forces. After Huan took over the court and threatened to take away Liu's command of the Beifu Army, he planned to rebel again, but this time, his staff member objected and walked out on him. With disaster seemingly inevitable, Liu Laozhi committed suicide.

One of Liu Laozhi's subordinates was Liu Yu, the future Emperor Wu of Liu Song who posthumously exonerated him when he overthrew Huan Xuan and restored the Jin dynasty in 404. Liu Laozhi was a controversial figure; despite his heroics at the Battle of Fei River and the northern expedition, his later string of betrayals ultimately branded him as one of the most notorious traitors of his period.

== Early life and career ==
=== Joining the Beifu Army ===
Liu Laozhi was descended from Liu Jiao, a brother of Emperor Gaozu of Han; he came from a family of generals in Pengcheng Commandery. His great-grandfather Liu Xi (劉羲) was known for his marksmanship and served during the reign of Emperor Wu of Jin as the Administrator for Beidi and Yanmen commanderies. His father, Liu Jian (劉建) was also known for his martial prowess and rose to the rank of General Who Attacks Barbarians. Liu Laozhi himself was described as resolute and tactful. Records claim that he possessed a purplish-red complexion with striking beard and pair of eyes.

In 377, the Inspector of Yan province, Xie Xuan was stationed at Guangling, where he began handpicking recruits to fight against the impending invasion of the Former Qin dynasty. Liu Laozhi was among the people drafted, serving as Xie Xuan's Army Advisor and leading troops at the front. Xie's new group became known as the Beifu Army, and they soon gained renown for being the empire's most elite fighting force that rarely lost in battle.

In 378, the Former Qin generals, Peng Chao and Ju Nan (俱難) invaded Pengcheng, and so Xie Xuan led his army to repel them. Liu Laozhi distinguished himself in the battle by destroying Ju Nan's baggage train and seizing his transport ships at Xuyi, for which he was appointed General of Hawkish Display and Chancellor of Guangling. In the same year, his spouse (Liu Jingxuan's mother) also died.

=== Battle of Luo Creek ===
In 383, to support Huan Chong's expedition against Xiangyang, the Interior Minister of Xuancheng, Hu Bin (胡彬) led his troops towards Shouyang (壽陽; in present-day Shou County, Anhui) with Liu Laozhi providing rear support. However, before they could arrive, Huan's attack failed, and the Heavenly King of Former Qin, Fu Jian, sent Fu Rong and Zhang Ci to capture Shouyang. The court ordered Hu Bin and Liu Laozhi to intercept them, but Hu cautiously camped at Xiashi (硤石; in present-day Huainan, Anhui) instead. Shouyang eventually fell, and Fu Jian brought his main force to occupy the city. He also sent Liang Cheng with 20,000 troops to set up camp at Luo Creek (洛澗; also in Huainan, Anhui) and act as a bulwark against the Jin assault.

The following month, Xie Xuan dispatched Liu Laozhi with 5,000 elite troops to attack Liang Cheng. When he saw Liu's army approaching, Liang ordered his troops to form a defensive line along the Luo river. However, Liu Laozhi charged straight ahead across the river and broke through their formation. Liang Cheng was killed in battle, and Liu Laozhi divided his troops to block the escape routes at all the river fords. The remaining Qin units collapsed, and as they scrambled to escape across the Huai River, Liu Laozhi's force killed or captured more than 10,000 of them and seized all their equipments. The success at Luo Creek was a crucial precursor to the more famous Battle of Fei River; shortly after, Xie Xuan, Xie Shi and the others led their troops to join Liu Laozhi and met Fu Jian's forces along the Fei River (淝水; in modern-day Lu'an, Anhui). The Jin forces defeated the numerically superior but highly dispirited Qin army in a historic victory, driving Fu Jian back to the north.

=== Xie Xuan's Northern Expedition ===
The defeat at Fei River sparked uprisings throughout the Former Qin empire. In 384, Liu Laozhi led the Beifu Army to capture Qiao commandery and was rewarded with the offices of Dragon-Prancing General and Interior Minister of Pengcheng, along with the fiefly title of Baron of Wugang County. Later that year, Xie Xuan, wishing to take advantage of the upheaval in Qin to reclaim lost territory, launched his northern expedition. He sent Liu Laozhi to attack the Qin Inspector of Yan province, Zhang Chong (張崇) at his city of Juancheng. As Zhang fled to the Later Yan, Liu recaptured Juancheng, and many cities and forts south of the Yellow River offered their surrender to Jin. Xie also sent Liu to conquer Qiaoniao (碻磝; southwest of present-day Chiping County, Shandong).

At the time, Fu Jian's son, Fu Pi was under siege by the rebel Prince of Later Yan, Murong Chui. Out of desperation, Fu Pi formed an unlikely alliance with Xie Xuan to lift the siege. Xie dispatched Liu Laozhi with 20,000 soldiers to reinforce Fu Pi against Murong Chui. Liu reached Fangtou (枋頭; in present-day Hebi, Henan) in 385 before he hesitated to go any further, as he received news that Fu Pi's subordinates had tampered with his terms of surrender. He later advanced to Sunjiu Palisade (孫就栅; northwest of present-day Xun County, Henan) to attack the Yan Administrator of Liyang, Liu Fu (劉撫). Murong Chui temporarily left his son, Murong Nong in charge of the siege to deal with the Jin threat at Sunjiu. Liu struggled in his early bouts with Murong Chui and retreated back to Liyang (黎陽; present-day Xun County, Henan), allowing Murong to return to Ye and continue his siege.

Liu Laozhi finally advanced to Ye the following month, and Murong Chui once again led his troops to face him. However, in a rare instance in his lengthy military career, Murong Chui suffered a defeat and was forced to lift his siege. He fled to Xincheng (新城; north of present-day Handan, Hebei), and then further up north, enticing Liu Laozhi to pursue him. Liu did not inform Fu Pi of his pursuit, and it was only later when Fu found out that he sent his soldiers to reinforce him. By then, Liu had caught up with Murong at Dongtang Swamp (董唐淵; northwest of present-day Quzhou County, Hebei), but his soldiers were weary from their long march. He attempted to destroy the Yan baggage train at Wuqiao Marsh (五橋澤), but Murong Chui dealt him a heavy defeat.

Murong Chui had Murong De and Murong Nong cut off Liu Laozhi's escape route at Five Zhang Bridge (五丈橋), but according to records, Liu was able to escape alone on a fast horse by jumping over the creek. He rode until he was met with Fu Pi's reinforcements, who helped bring him to safety. At Linzhang Commandery, Liu Laozhi regathered his scattered soldiers and restored some of their morale, but due to his earlier defeat, he was recalled.

=== Defending the north ===
Despite this setback, Liu Laozhi was soon reappointed as Dragon Prancing General and garrisoned at Huaiyin (淮陰, in modern Huai'an, Jiangsu) before later moving to Pengcheng and serving as its Administrator. In 389, he quelled a rebellion at Huangqiu (皇丘; in present-day Yongcheng, Henan) led by Liu Li (劉黎), who proclaimed himself as Emperor. Later that year, the Former Qin general, Zhang Yuan (張願) occupied Jinxiang and besieged the Jin Administrator of Taishan, Yang Mai (羊邁). Liu Laozhi initially sent his Army Advisor, Xiang Qinzhi (向欽之) to repel him, but the Heavenly King of Zhai Wei, Zhai Liao sent his son Zhai Zhao to reinforce Zhang Yuan. Liu summoned Xiang back and waited for Zhai Zhao to withdraw. Once he did, Liu recaptured Taishan and pursued him, forcing Zhai Zhao to flee north of the Yellow River. He then defeated Zhai Zhao at Huatai (滑台, in modern Anyang, Henan) and accepted Zhang Yuan's surrender.

In 393, Liu Laozhi put down another rebellion, this time by Sima Hui (司馬徽) at Mount Matou (馬頭山; in present-day Jiaozuo, Henan). However, in 394, the Later Yan invaded Linqiu (廩丘, in modern Puyang, Henan), and Liu received an urgent request from the Administrator of Gaoping, Xu Han (徐含) for reinforcements. Liu was unable to help, and as a result he was charged with cowardice and stripped of office.

== Power struggle in the south ==
=== Betraying Wang Gong ===
For the next few years, Liu Laozhi remained out of military and government service. It was not until 397 when he reappeared; that year, the Inspector of Qing and Yan province, Wang Gong was planning to march from Jingkou onto the capital, Jiankang to compel Emperor An of Jin's regent, Sima Daozi to remove his corrupt associate, Wang Guobao. He invited Liu to serve on his staff as Interior Minister of Southern Pengcheng and General Who Assists the State, which Liu agreed.

The insurrection that year ended with a peace agreement between Wang and Sima after the latter had Wang Guobao executed. However, one of Wang's allies, Wang Xin refused to disperse his army and rebelled against him at Wu Commandery. Wang Gong sent Liu Laozhi with 5,000 troops to attack Wang Xin, and Liu ultimately defeated the rebels at Qu'e (曲阿; present-day Danyang, Jiangsu). For his reward, Liu Laozhi was appointed Administrator of Jinling.

In 398, Wang Gong, in an alliance with the Inspector of Yu province, Yu Kai and the Inspector of Jing province, Yin Zhongkan, once again raised an army against Sima Daozi, this time to force him to remove his confidants, Sima Shangzhi and his brothers, as well as the Inspector of Jiang province, Wang Yu (王愉). In response, Sima Daozi sent his son, Sima Yuanxian as Commander of the Expeditionary Force to oppose them.

Though it was Wang Gong who reinstated him in the military, Liu Laozhi resented him as Wang grew excessively proud of his achievements from the prior year but continued to treat Liu as a mere subordinate despite his military. Sima Yuanxian was aware of their animosity, so he sent the Administrator of Lujiang and a fellow Beifu Army general, Gao Su (高素) to persuade him into defecting, promising him Wang's positions in return. After discussing with his son, Liu Jingxuan, Liu Laozhi agreed. Wang's Army Advisor, He Danzhi (何澹之) discovered that they were colluding and warned his superior about Liu. However, knowing that He and Liu hated each other, Wang disregarded his warning as slander.

Before sending him off, Wang Gong held a special banquet for Liu Laozhi where he publicly recognized him as an elder brother. He entrusted Liu with his best soldiers and equipments before ordering him to lead another general, Yan Yan (顏延) at the vanguard. When they arrived at Zhuli (竹里; north of present-day Jurong, Jiangsu), Liu Laozhi killed Yan Yan and surrendered to the imperial court. He sent Liu Jingxuan and his son-in-law, Gao Yazhi back to ambush Wang at his city. The two captured him and sent him to the capital for execution. With Wang Gong dead, Liu Laozhi replaced him as Chief Controller of military affairs in the provinces of Yan, Qing, Ji, You, Bing, Xu, and Yang and Jinling commandery.

As Liu had suddenly rose from a junior general to a highly-important position, he struggled to win the support his new subordinates, and so he surrounded himself with confidants such as Xu Qianzhi (徐謙之) to gain a better footing. Meanwhile, Yin Zhongkan's generals, Yang Quanqi and Huan Xuan arrived at Shitou when they received news of Wang Gong's death. They submitted a petition demanding for Liu Laozhi's execution, but when Liu appeared with the Beifu Army to camp at Xinting (新亭; south of present-day Jiangning, Jiangsu), they were frightened into withdrawing back to Cai Islet (蔡洲; southwest of present-day Nanjing, Jiangsu). With both sides at a standstill, the imperial court decided to negotiate peace with the rebels, so they ordered Liu to welcome Yang and Huan before withdrawing back to Jingkou. The situation was resolved after Yin Zhongkan was pardoned and Yang and Huan were appointed as Inspector of Yong province and Inspector of Jiang province respectively.

=== Sun En's Rebellion ===
In 399, the leader of the Taoist Five Pecks of Rice sect, Sun En launched a naval invasion of the Three Wu Region (Wu, Wuxing and Kuaiji) from the Zhoushan Islands, his followers swelling to around 100,000. Liu Laozhi initially sent Huan Bao (桓寶) and Liu Jingxuan to reinforce the region, but when he heard that the Interior Minister of Wu, Huan Qian, had abandoned his post, he submitted a memorial to personally lead his forces against Sun En. It was around this time when he met a certain Liu Yu, who he recruited into his military staff.

When Liu Laozhi arrived at Wu with the Guard General, Xie Yan, he repeatedly defeated the rebels and made their way to the Zhejiang River. During the campaign, the court appointed Liu as the General of the Front and Chief Controller of military affairs in Wu Commandery. When Liu Laozhi crossed the river, Sun En led his followers to escape back to the islands, leaving behind large amounts of wealth and even their children back on the mainland. Liu's soldiers rushed to pillage the countryside, thus not only allowing Sun En to escape, but also causing disaffection among the local populace. Once Sun En left, Liu Laozhi returned to Jingkou.

In 400, Sun En invaded Kuaiji again, this time killing Xie Yan. Liu Laozhi was promoted to General Who Guards the North and Chief Controller of five commanderies including Kuaiji. When Liu led his troops to meet him, Sun retreated back to the sea, so he camped at Shangyu and sent his generals out to defend the various counties.

In 401, Sun En attacked Jiakou, and Liu initially repelled him back to the islands again. However, Sun soon turned around to attack Wu Commandery, where he killed the Interior Minister, Yuan Shansong (袁山松). Sun En then advanced north through the sea route with the aim of capturing Jingkou. The capital was greatly alarmed, and Liu Laozhi attempted to intercept him from Shanyin County but realized he could not make there in time. Thus, he instructed Liu Yu at Haiyan County to march along the coast to fight back against Sun En. Though Liu Yu had very few troops, he was able to defeat Sun En's forces at Dantu. Sun had to regroup and changed his course to Jiankang, but by then, the city was already reinforced and Liu Laozhi had returned to Jingkou, so he fled to Yu Islet (郁洲; in present-day Lianyungang, Jiangsu) in the end.

=== Betraying Sima Yuanxian ===
While Liu Laozhi was campaigning against Sun En, Huan Xuan was accumulating power in Jing province after he had killed both Yin Zhongkan and Yang Quanqi in c.January 400. As the threat of Huan Xuan grew, Sima Yuanxian launched a military campaign against him in 402. Liu Laozhi was appointed Chief Controller of the Vanguard and General Who Attacks the West with command over Jiang province.

Liu Laozhi's fame and prestige grew thanks to his exploits against Sun En, and the imperial court considered him the most capable general to oppose Huan Xuan. However, Liu was personally worried of Huan's talents and his command over the full might of the Jing forces. He also feared that defeating Huan may cause him to overshadow the emperor in terms of achievements and would draw suspicion from Sima Yuanxian as a potential usurper. Therefore, he marched out to Li Islet (溧洲; in present-day He County, Anhui) to comply with the court's order but refused to go any further despite Liu Yu requesting him permission to do so. Huan Xuan marched south down the Yangtze River, capturing Sima Shangzhi along the way, and he sent an envoy, He Mu (何穆) to persuade Liu Laozhi to defect.

He Mu played into Liu Laozhi's mistrust of Sima Yuanxian, and with Sima Shangzhi already defeated, Liu decided to open talks with Huan Xuan. Liu Yu, Liu Jingxuan and Liu Laozhi's nephew He Wuji all objected to his decision, but were ignored. In the end, Liu Laozhi sent Liu Jingxuan to give Huan Xuan his surrender. Huan secretly wished to eliminate Liu Laozhi, and to dispel Liu Jingxuan's worries, he held a banquet for him showing off his calligraphy and painting collection. Liu Jingxuan was convinced that nothing was amiss, and raised no further objections. Not long after Liu Laozhi's surrender, Sima Yuanxian, Sima Shangzhi and the others were all defeated and killed by Huan Xuan, while Sima Daozi was exiled.

=== Attempt to betray Huan Xuan and death ===
Immediately after he took control of the imperial court, Huan Xuan appointed Liu Laozhi General Who Attacks the East and Administrator of Kuaiji, ostensibly as a reward, but in reality stripping him of command over the Beifu Army by transferring him away from Jingkou. Liu Laozhi realized he had been tricked and anticipated the worst. When Liu Jingxuan returned from Huan Xuan, he urged Liu Laozhi to launch a surprise attack on Huan Xuan's residence, but Liu Laozhi was undecided and moved his camp to Bandu (班瀆; north of present-day Nanjing, Jiangsu) instead. There, he privately asked Liu Yu for advice on if he should go north of the Yangtze to join forces with Gao Yazhi, then serving as Chancellor of Guangling, to oppose Huan Xuan, but Liu Yu said, "General, you, with tens of thousands of elite troops under your command, surrendered at the mere sight of the enemy. Now he (Huan Xuan) possesses the power and prestige to shake all under Heaven. Both the will of the court and the people have been lost; how could you possibly hope to achieve anything at Guangling?"

Liu Yu walked out on Liu Laozhi and retired to Jingkou. Later, Liu Laozhi held a meeting with his staff to present his plans in resisting Huan Xuan. However, his Army Advisor, Liu Xi (劉襲) told him, "Nothing is more despicable than rebellion. General, you rebelled against Wang Yanzhou (Wang Gong), you rebelled against Sima Langjun (Sima Yuanxian) and now you wish to rebel against Duke Huan (Huan Xuan). You are a man thrice-treacherous. How can you expect to establish yourself?" The remainder of Liu Laozhi's staff then all left and dispersed. With most of his subordinates gone, Liu Laozhi panicked and instructed Liu Jingxuan to return to Jingkou and fetch their family. When Liu Jingxuan did not return at the expected time, Liu Laozhi assumed that Huan Xuan had already executed all them. He and his remaining followers fled north to Guangling, but when they reached Xin Islet (新洲; in present-day Yangzhou, Jiangsu), Liu Laozhi hanged himself.

When Liu Jingxuan eventually arrived, he had no time to mourn and went straight ahead to Guangling. Liu Laozhi's subordinates had him buried at Dantu, but Huan Xuan later destroyed his coffin, beheaded him and had his body burnt in the marketplace. In 403, Huan Xuan usurped the throne, but the following year he was defeated and killed by a coalition led by Liu Yu. After restoring the Jin, Liu Yu had Liu Laozhi reburied and posthumously restored him to his original offices.
