= Sima Daozi =

Prince of Kuaiji (會稽王)
- Reign: 27 December 392 - 3 February 403

Prince of Langye (琅邪王)
- Reign: 12 September 372-392
- Successor: Sima Dewen
- Born: 363/364; Jiankang, Eastern Jin
- Died: 3 February 403 (aged 39); Ancheng Prefecture (安成郡), Eastern Jin
- Issue: Sima Yuanxian
Posthumous name
- Prince Wenxiao of Kuaiji (會稽文孝王)
- Father: Emperor Jianwen of Jin
- Mother: Li Lingrong

Sima Daozi (Chinese: 司馬道子) (363 (Note: According to Sima Daozi's biography in Book of Jin, he was 10 (by East Asian reckoning) when he was made Prince of Langya. According to his father Emperor Jianwen's biography in the same work, Daozi was made Prince of Langya in the 7th month of the 2nd year of the Xian'an era. This corresponds to 16 Aug to 13 Sep 372 in the Julian calendar. Thus by calculation, Sima Daozi's birth year should be 363. However, Daozi's biography recorded that he was 39 (by East Asian reckoning) when he was poisoned. If this record is correct, his birth year should be 364 instead.) – 3 February 403 (Note: According to Sima Dezong's biography in Book of Jin, Sima Daozi was killed by Huan Xuan on the geng'shen day of the 12th month of the 1st year of the Yuan'xing era of Sima Dezong's reign. This corresponds to 3 Feb 403 in the Julian calendar. Vol. 112 of Zizhi Tongjian only indicate that he was poisoned after the xin'hai day of the 12th month of the 1st year of the Yuan'xing era, which corresponds to 25 Jan 403 in the Julian calendar.)), courtesy name Daozi (道子), posthumous name Prince Wenxiao of Kuaiji (會稽文孝王), was a prince of China's Eastern Jin dynasty. He served as regent during the reign of his nephew, Emperor An. He was the younger brother of Emperor Xiaowu.

== Early life ==
Sima Daozi was born in 363, a year after his older brother Sima Yao was born to their father, Sima Yu, Prince of Kuaiji, and mother Consort Li. In 371, after the paramount general Huan Wen deposed Emperor Fei to showcase his power, he made Sima Yu emperor (as Emperor Jianwen). On 12 September 372, when Emperor Jianwen grew ill, he created Sima Yao crown prince and Sima Daozi the Prince of Langye. He died later that day, and Sima Yao assumed the throne as Emperor Xiaowu. (Note: By this time, both Sima Yao and Sima Daozi were two of the few surviving grandsons of Emperor Yuan.)

== During Emperor Xiaowu's reign ==
As the emperor's only surviving brother, Sima Daozi was in an honored position. In 380, when he was 16 or 17, he was offered the position of prime minister, but he declined. In 383, he finally accepted the title while the empire was preparing for a showdown with the powerful rival Former Qin, and, after Jin forces repelled Former Qin forces at the Battle of Fei River, thus guaranteeing the dynasty's continued survival, he soon came into a power conflict with Xie An, who had served as Emperor Xiaowu's regent ever since Emperor Xiaowu's ascension; this conflict was aggravated by Xie An's son-in-law Wang Guobao, whose cousin was Sima Daozi's wife and whom Xie disfavored, who therefore retaliated by slandering Xie before Emperor Xiaowu and Sima Daozi. Emperor Xiaowu therefore began to listen to Xie less, and in 385, Xie volunteered to lead an army and leave the capital to avoid further conflict with Sima Daozi. When Xie died later that year, Sima Daozi became the head of the government under Emperor Xiaowu, who entrusted his brother with most important affairs of state.

Both Emperor Xiaowu and Sima Daozi were described to be spending much of their time drinking and feasting, rather than with important affairs of state. A number of politicians who wanted power gathered around Sima Daozi and flattered him, causing him to be less and less deferential to the emperor. He was also known for being obsessed with gathering wealth and for extravagance in living—including constructing an artificial hill in the back of his mansion, an excessively expensive and difficult task. Emperor Xiaowu eventually became angry about the situation, and he commissioned the well-known officials Wang Gong and Yin Zhongkan to be provincial governors to counteract Sima Daozi's authority. The emperor and the prince at times suspected of each other, requiring intervention of their mother Empress Dowager Li. However, eventually they reconciled. It was around this time that Sima Daozi would, fatefully, inadvertently offend Huan Wen's son Huan Xuan the Duke of Nan Commandery—as at one feast where Sima Daozi invited Huan Xuan as a guest, after Sima Daozi became drunk, he made the statement, "Was it not true that when Huan Wen became old, he planned treason?" Huan Xuan was so struck by the statement that he fell prostrate on the ground, fearing that Sima Daozi would kill him, and from this point he bore a grudge against the prince.

On 27 December 392, Sima Daozi was created the Prince of Kuaiji, to permit the greater title of Prince of Langye be given to Emperor Xiaowu's second son Sima Dewen (Note: younger brother of the developmentally disabled Crown Prince Sima Dezong).

In 396, Emperor Xiaowu, after offending his favorite concubine Honoured Lady Zhang, was suffocated by her in his sleep. However, with the crown prince being developmentally disabled and with Sima Daozi being foolish and unthinking, no one investigated his death. Crown Prince Dezong took the throne as Emperor An; Sima Daozi, as the emperor's uncle, served as regent.

== As Emperor An's regent ==
Sima Daozi, as regent, greatly trusted Wang Guobao and his cousin Wang Xu (王緒) because of their flattery, and his regency quickly developed a reputation for being corrupt and incompetent. Wang Gong, whom Emperor Xiaowu entrusted with the armies of the northeastern part of the empire, considered starting a rebellion to overthrow Wang Guobao and Wang Xu. In 397, Wang Guobao and Wang Xu suggested to Sima Daozi that the armies that Wang Gong and Yin Zhongkan were in charge of be reduced; Wang Gong and Yin, who was in command of the western provinces, in response, mobilized their forces and declared that Wang Guobao and Wang Xu should be executed. Sima Daozi, in fear, forced Wang Guobao to commit suicide and executed Wang Xu. Wang Gong and Yin then retreated. From this point on, Sima Daozi trusted no one but his teenaged heir apparent, Sima Yuanxian, and entrusted the capital guards to Sima Yuanxian. He also gave military commands to his distant relatives Sima Shangzhi (司馬尚之) the Prince of Qiao and Sima Shangzhi's brother Sima Xiuzhi, as well as Wang Yu (王愉), in 398.

The giving of a military command to Wang Yu oddly drew a reaction from Wang Gong and Yin—as Wang Yu's command included four commanderies originally under the command of Yu Kai (庾楷), (Note: grandson of Yu Liang and brother of Pei Songzhi's mother) who became angry and managed to persuade Wang Gong and Yin that Sima Daozi's intention was to act against them as well. They therefore rose again, but Sima Daozi was able to persuade Wang Gong's general Liu Laozhi (劉牢之), who was in command of the elite Beifu Forces (北府兵), to suddenly turn against Wang Gong, capturing and executing him. Yin, hearing of Wang Gong's death, was in fear but considered proceeding anyway—and Sima Daozi, under suggestion by Huan Xuan's cousin Huan Xiu (桓脩), managed to cause dissension between Yin and his generals Huan Xuan and Yang Quanqi (楊佺期) by offering Huan and Yang key posts; although Huan and Yang nominally remained Yin's allies, Yin was forced to withdraw his troops, and from that point on no longer posed a major threat, as his domain had now been divided into three, with Huan and Yang each given a third.

In late 398, the magician Sun Tai (孫泰), a friend of Sima Yuanxian's, who had gathered great following due to his magic, was exposed as planning a plot to take over the central government, and Sima Daozi ordered Sima Yuanxian to trap Sun Tai and execute him. Sun Tai's nephew Sun En fled to Zhoushan Island and planned revenge.

In summer 399, Sima Yuanxian, wanting even greater power, took an opportunity when his father was very drunk to have Emperor An issue an edict transferring Sima Daozi's authorities to Sima Yuanxian. When Sima Daozi awoke from his stupor, he was enraged, but after that point his power became extremely limited, even though he nominally remained regent.

Later in 399, Sun En launched his rebellion and captured most of the eastern empire for a while, until Liu Laozhi led his Beifu Forces and defeated Sun, forcing him to flee back to Zhoushan. Still, the only region remaining under central government control was now laid waste.

In 401, Sima Yuanxian, apprehensive of Huan Xuan (Note: Huan had by then defeated and executed Yin and Yang, taking over the entire western part of the empire.), declared Huan a renegade and launched a campaign against him. However, he relied on Liu's troops; Liu, not trusting Yuanxian's intentions, again changed sides and joined Huan. In 402 the capital Jiankang fell to Huan's forces. Sima Yuanxian was captured and executed, while Sima Daozi was exiled to Ancheng (安成, in modern Ji'an, Jiangxi). Around the new year 403, an official sent by Huan Xuan, pursuant to Huan Xuan's instructions, poisoned Sima Daozi to death.
