= Yu Daolian =

Yu Daolian 庾道憐

Empress consort of the Eastern Jin dynasty
- Tenure: 13 August 365 – 5 July 366
- Predecessor: Empress Wang Muzhi
- Successor: Empress Wang Fahui
- Born: unknown
- Died: 5 July 366; Jiankang, Eastern Jin
- Spouse: Emperor Fei of Jin
Posthumous name
- Empress Xiao (孝皇后); Duchess of Haixi (海西公夫人)
- Father: Yu Bing

Yu Daolian (Chinese: 庾道憐; died 5 July 366 (Note: While Lady Yu's birth year was not recorded, her father Yu Bing was born in 296 and died in Dec 344. Thus, Lady Yu's birth year should be between 309 and 344.)), formally Empress Xiao (孝皇后, literally "the filial empress"), was an empress of the Eastern Jin dynasty. Her husband was Emperor Fei of Jin.

== Life ==
Yu Daolian was a daughter of Yu Bing, one of the co-prime ministers during the reigns of Emperor Cheng and Emperor Kang—both Bing's nephews and sons of his younger sister Empress Yu Wenjun, making Daolian an aunt to her husband, who was Empress Yu Wenjun's grandson. Little is known about her. She was already Emperor Fei's wife when he was Prince of Donghai during the reign of his cousin Emperor Mu, and she then carried the title of Princess Consort of Donghai. Presumably, after he was given the greater title of Prince of Langye after his brother Emperor Ai became emperor in July 361, she carried the title of Princess of Langye, but there was no record of her using that title. After her husband became emperor in 365 after his brother's death, he created her empress on 13 August. She died slightly less than a year later in July 366, without having had any children, and was given the posthumous name Empress Xiao and buried with honors due an empress. (Note: The reason why her posthumous name was one character rather than two, as was customary for empresses of the period, was that typically one character came from her husband's posthumous name, but her husband, who was later deposed, did not have a posthumous name and therefore had no character to add to her posthumous name.)

Emperor Fei was deposed by the powerful general Huan Wen in 371. After he was then demoted to the title of Duke of Haixi, Empress Yu was also posthumously demoted to the title of Duchess of Haixi. After he died in November 386, she was disinterred and reburied with her husband at his place of exile, Wu (吳縣, in modern Suzhou, Jiangsu).

== Notes ==
Chinese royalty
Preceded by Empress Wang Muzhi	Empress of Jin Dynasty (266–420); 365–366	Succeeded by Empress Wang Fahui
