= Wang Tanzhi =

Chinese Eastern Jin official (330-375)

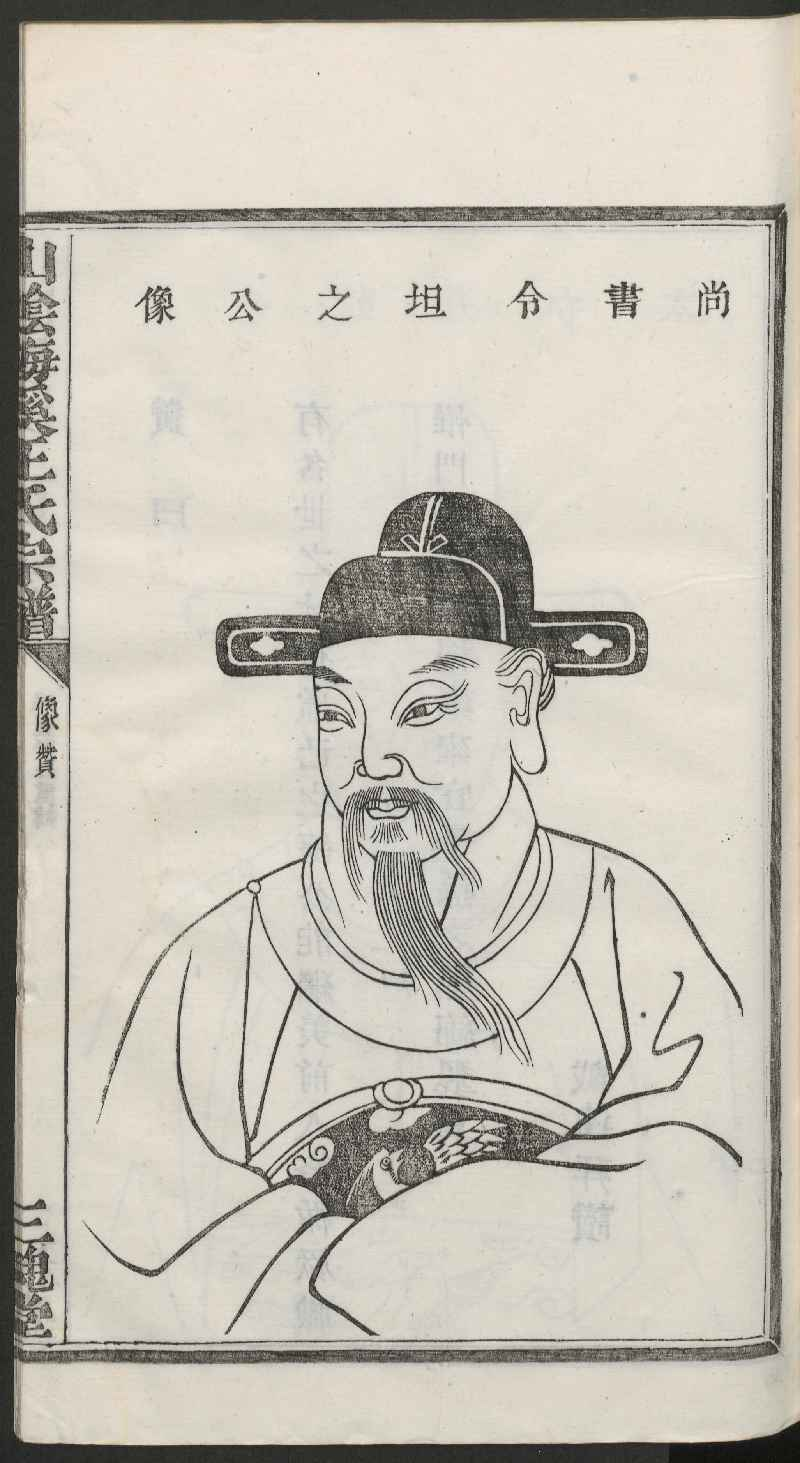
Wang Tanzhi

Wang Tanzhi (Chinese: 王坦之; pinyin: Wáng Tǎnzhī; Wade–Giles: Wang-t'an-shih) (330 - 16 June 375), courtesy name Wéndù (文度), was an official in the Eastern Jin Dynasty, during the 4th century CE. He had served under the general Huan Wen until the latter's death in 373. He, together with Xie An, became the guardian of the young Emperor Xiaowu of Jin, but he died less than three years after Xiaowu became emperor.

== Family ==
Wang Tanzhi was a member of the Wang clan of Taiyuan. His great-grandfather Wang Zhan (王湛; 249-295) was a son of Cao Wei official Wang Chang and a younger brother of Wang Hun; Tanzhi's father was Wang Shu (王述; 303-368).

Wang Tanzhi's spouse was Fan Gai (范盖), an aunt of Fan Tai. Their children include Wang Guobao and Wang Chen (王忱; died 18 November 392).
