= Gan Tingting =

Chinese actress

- 甘婷婷
- Born: February 5, 1986 (age 40); Wuhu, Anhui, China
- Other name: Bobo Gan
- Education: Central Academy of Drama
- Occupation: Actress
- Years active: 2005–present
- Agent: Gan Tingting Studio (under Hairun Media)

Gan Tingting (Chinese: 甘婷婷; pinyin: Gān Tíngtíng; born 5 February 1986), also known as Bobo Gan, is a Chinese actress.

Gan is noted for her performance in the Vietnam-China movie Hanoi, Hanoi, for which she won Best Actress award at the Golden Kite Awards. She is also known for the television series All Men Are Brothers (2011), New Treasure Raider (2016) and General and I (2017).

== Early life and education ==
Gan was born and raised in Wuhu, Anhui. She graduated from Central Academy of Drama, majoring in acting.

== Acting career ==
Gan made her acting debut in Founding Emperor of Ming Dynasty, a historical television series based on the life of Hongwu Emperor.

In 2006, Gan won the Best Actress Award at the Golden Kite International Film Festival for her performance in the film Hanoi, Hanoi.

Gan rose to prominence in China for her role in All Men Are Brothers (2012), a wuxia television series based on the novel Water Margin which was highly rated in China.

In 2013, Gan starred in the historical television series Heroes in Sui and Tang Dynasties, and received positive reviews for her performance.

In 2016, Gan starred in New Treasure Raider, based on the novel, based on Gu Long's wuxia novel. She received the Best Supporting Actress award at the 3rd Hengdian Film and TV Festival of China.

In 2017, Gan starred in the historical romance drama General and I.

== Filmography ==
=== Film ===
Year	English title	Chinese title	Role	Ref.
2005	Hanoi, Hanoi	河内，河内	Su Su	
2005	Last Time Love You	最后一次爱你	Xia Xiaoyu	
2006	Cold Wind Town	寒风镇	Lu Yiyi	
2007	Kung Fu Dunk	大灌篮	Girl student	
2010	Chase Our Love	宅男总动员	Han Jing	
2011	The Silent War	听风者		Cameo
2012	The Bullet Vanishes	消失的子弹		
2013	Drug War	毒战	Sister-in-law	
2020	The Spy Walker	无间行者之生死潜行	Carrie	
TBA	The Adventures of Gamble Stone	石破添惊		
TBA	Top Secret Project	绝密工程		
TBA	The Eagles	鹰猎长空		
TBA	Dangerous Memory	危险记忆		
TBA	Million Puzzles	百万谜团		
TBA	Di Renjie - Nightmare into the Soul	狄仁杰之夺魂梦魇		
TBA	Above the Line of Fire	火线之上		
TBA	Back to Earth	重回地球		
TBA	Flower Goddess	聊斋之花神绎妃		

=== Television series ===
Year	English title	Chinese title	Role	Ref.
2005	Founding Emperor of Ming Dynasty	朱元璋	Yu Er	
2005	Sky Fire	天火	Zuo Tianyu	
2006	Landing, Please Open Mobile Phone	落地，请开手机	Ye Huimei	
2006	Love Magic Power	爱情魔方	Qian Qian	
2006	Not Able to Not Having Her	不能没有她	Zhou Jingjing	
2007	Night Run	夜奔	Xia Tianchi	
2007	Detective Cheng Xu	侦探成旭	Wei Qiuting	
2007	Jianghu Brother	江湖兄弟	Xiao Yuling	
2008	Locking Spring	锁春记	Ye Congbi	
2008	Seven Days that Shocked the World	震撼世界的七日	Yang Jing	
2008	Gong and Drum Alley	锣鼓巷	Yao Bizhu	
2009	Red Sorghum	高粱红了	Li Qiuying	
2009	New Fourth Army Woman Soldier	新四军女兵	Xiang Ruihua	
2009	Life and Death Lost Part	生死迷局	Sang Ni	
2010	Ice Is the Sleeping Water	冰是睡着的水	Bai Ling	
2010	Life and Death Right Name	生死正名	Xin Lili	
2010	Flight Attendant Diary	空姐日记	Wu Lan	
2011	All Men Are Brothers	水浒传	Pan Jinlian	
2011	Mantis	螳螂	Chen Lihong	
2011	Hidden Intention	被遗弃的秘密	Zhou Yuqin	
2011	Drawing Sword	新亮剑	Tian Yu	
2012	Mystery in the Palace	深宫谍影	Liu Hanxiang	
2012	Wrong Marriage	错嫁	Su Xiangying	
2012	Chinese Sherlock Shi	新施公案	Shen Mochou	
2012	The Legend of Zhong Kui	钟馗传说	Ao Xi	
2012	To Advance toward the Fire	向着炮火前进	Shangguan Yufei	
2013	Wen Family's Secret	文家的秘密	Yu Lu	
2013	Heroes in Sui and Tang Dynasties	隋唐演义	Dongfang Yumei	
2013	Love's Relativity	恋爱相对论	Hao Liren	
2013	To Advance Toward the Victory	向着胜利前进	Wang Ai	
2013	Happy Wife Growing Up	幸福媳妇成长记	Ye Xiaoyu	
2014	The Stand-in	十月围城	Fang Hong	
2014	Cosmetology High	美人制造	Lin Ruo	
2015	Hua Xu Yin: City of Desperate Love	華胥引	Murong An	
2015	Twenty-four Turn	二十四道拐	Wang Yaqin	
2016	New Treasure Raider	新萧十一郎	Shen Bijun	
2016	Before Dawn	潜伏在黎明之前	Lv Yanting	
2017	General and I	孤芳不自赏	Yao Tian	
2017	Xuan-Yuan Sword: Han Cloud	轩辕剑外传汉之云	Wushan Immortal	
2017	The Legend of Kaifeng	开封府传奇	Liu E	
TBA	Shanghai Picked Flowers	十里洋场拾年花	Xu Caiyi	
TBA	Faith	信仰		
TBA		灵州盛会		
TBA		爱拼会赢		

== Awards and nominations ==
Year	Award	Category	Nominated work	Result	Ref.
2007	Golden Kite Awards	Best Actress	Hanoi, Hanoi	Won	
2011	3rd China TV Drama Awards	Best New Actress	All Men Are Brothers	Won	
2016	3rd Hengdian Film and TV Festival of China	Best Supporting Actress	New Treasure Raider	Won	
2017	22nd Huading Awards	Best Actress (Ancient Drama)	New Treasure Raider	Nominated	
