= Wang Gong (Jin dynasty) =

Chinese Jin dynasty consort kin and general (died 398)

- 王恭

Inspector of Two Provinces of Yan and Qing (兗、青二州刺史)
- In office 390 – 398
- Monarch: Emperor Xiaowu of Jin/Emperor An of Jin

Personal details
- Born: 350s (Note: Wang's biography in Jin Shu recorded that he was older than Wang Fahui, who was born in c.360.)
- Died: 13 October 398
- Relations: Wang Fahui (younger sister)
- Parent: Wang Yun (father)
- Courtesy name: Xiaobo (孝伯)
- Childhood name: Aning (阿寧)
- Posthumous name: Zhongjian (忠簡)

Wang Gong (350s – 13 October 398), courtesy name Xiaobo, childhood nickname Aning, posthumous name Zhongjian, was a consort kin and military general of China's Eastern Jin dynasty. He was the brother-in-law of Emperor Xiaowu through his younger sister, Empress Wang Fahui.

Wang was given command over the northern border provinces of Yan and Qing, and after Emperor Xiaowu's son, Emperor An, ascended the throne in 396, he used his armies to lead two insurrections against the regent, Sima Daozi, who he accused of elevating corrupt officials to positions of power. The first insurrection in 397 concluded with Wang forcing Sima Daozi to execute his trusted advisor, Wang Guobao. However, his second insurrection the following year saw him betrayed by his general, Liu Laozhi, leading to his capture and execution.

== Early life ==
A member of the prestigious Wang clan of Taiyuan, Wang Gong was the grandson of the famous minister, Wang Meng and the second son of the Household Counsellor Wang Yun (王蘊; 330-384); his elder brother Wang Hua (王华) died young. His aunt Wang Muzhi was the empress of Emperor Ai of Jin, while his sister Wang Fahui married Emperor Xiaowu of Jin in 375, thus making Wang Gong the emperor's brother-in-law. (Note: Although Empress Wang died in 380, Emperor Xiaowu never had another empress for the rest of his reign.) He was renowned for his talent and character when he was young, and he was said to be confident enough in his abilities that he aspired to become a Prime Minister in the future.

Wang Gong was as famous as his distant cousin, Wang Chen (王忱; died 18 November 392) (Note: Wang Chen was a brother of Wang Guobao; a Wang Shi Pu annotation in vol.05 of Shishuo Xinyu recorded that Fan Ning's younger sister Fan Gai was Wang Chen's mother. Since Fan Ning was also Wang Guobao's maternal uncle, Chen and Guobao are likely full brothers. The annals of Emperor Xiaowu in Jin Shu recorded that Wang Chen died on the xinhai day of the 10th month of the 17th year of the Taiyuan era.) and initially served as an Assistant Editorial Director, but he was disappointed with his low-rank and resigned due to illness. He later became Vice Director of the Palace Library and was transferred to Palace Attendant, but before he could take up his position, his father died, so he once again resigned to oversee his mourning period. At the end of the period, he returned to the government and successively served as Gentleman of the Personnel Bureau, General Who Establishes Might, Intendant of Danyang, Prefect of the Palace Writers and Chief of Affairs to the Crown Prince.

At the time, the Jin court was entrenched in factionalism between Emperor Xiaowu and his brother, the Prince of Kuaiji, Sima Daozi. Wang Gong sided with Emperor Xiaowu, who held his brother-in-law in high esteem. One of Sima Daozi's supporters, Yuan Yuezhi (袁悅之), often advised the prince to monopolize his power in the court, but Wang Gong reported his behaviour to the emperor, who subsequently had him executed. To strengthen his position, the emperor sent out a few of his associates to take up military command in neighbouring provinces outside the capital. In 390, Wang Gong was garrisoned at Jingkou after he was appointed Chief Controller of military affairs in the provinces of Qing, Yan, You, Bing and Ji, General of the Front and Inspector of Qing and Yan provinces.

== Wang Gong's Insurrections ==
=== Death of Emperor Xiaowu ===
In November 396, Emperor Xiaowu was assassinated by his concubine, Lady Zhang, and was succeeded by his developmentally disabled son, Emperor An with Sima Daozi acting as his regent. Daozi had a close confidant, Wang Guobao, who was a distant cousin of Wang Gong. After his prince assumed the regency, Wang Guobao was allowed to share joint control with him over the imperial court and promoted another cousin Wang Xu (王緒) as the Interior Minister of Langya. However, Wang Guobao and Wang Xu were both infamously corrupt and widely loathed by the people at the time, including Wang Gong himself.

Wang Gong soon paid a visit to the imperial tombs at the capital, Jiankang, during which he spoke sternly and openly expressed his contempt for the current state of affairs. Sima Daozi was wary of him, and to win over his late brother's associates, he humbled himself when speaking to Wang. However, as Wang refused to change his demeanor, he abandoned the idea and began plotting against Wang instead. Wang Xu advised Wang Guobao that they should ambush and kill Wang Gong when he enters the court, but the plan was rejected.

Wang Gong considered setting up an ambush of his own against Wang Guobao, but he was worried that the Inspector of Yu province and Wang Guobao's ally, Yu Kai would retaliate. Another associate of Emperor Xiaowu, Wang Xun of the Langya Wang clan, also advised him to bide his time as Wang Guobao's crimes will eventually expose themselves, giving Wang Gong a proper pretext to remove him from power. In the end, Wang Gong decided not to act, but before he returned to Jingkou, he warned Sima Daozi, "When the sovereign mourns, even the great ministers, Yi Yin and Huo Guang struggled through hardships. May your majesty cherish state affairs, accept honest advice, banish sycophants, and keep away from flatterers." Wang Guobao knew Gong's remarks were aimed at him and feared for his life.

=== First insurrection (397) ===
In 397, Wang Guobao strongly urged Sima Daozi to reduce Wang Gong's military power. Meanwhile, Wang Gong prepared his troops and submitted a memorial to launch a northern expedition. Sima Daozi was suspicious of his intent, and ordered him to disband on the reason that an expedition would interfere with the harvest season. At the same time, Wang Gong approached the Inspector of Jing province, Yin Zhongkan on his plan to campaign against Wang Guobao at Jiankang. After receiving Yin's approval, Wang sent out a petition outlining Wang Guobao's crimes and his intention to march onto the capital.

Wang Guobao panicked when the petition reached Jiankang and summoned Wang Xun and Che Yin on what he should do. Following their advice, Wang admitted to his crimes and resigned, but soon regretted the decision and reinstated himself. However, Sima Daozi, desperate to appease Wang Gong, had Wang Guobao arrested and executed along with Wang Xu. The regent sent his envoys to apologize, and with no reason to continue, Wang disbanded his troops and returned to Jingkou.

During the campaign, the minister and Wang Xun's cousin, Wang Xin was in Wu commandery mourning his mother. He raised an army in support of Wang Gong, but he soon received news of Wang Gong's withdrawal and was instructed to resume his mourning period. However, Wang Xun had killed many local dissidents during his uprising and did not want give up his power, so he ordered his troops to attack Wang Gong and sent a letter to Sima Daozi expressing his support. Daozi ignored Wang Xin's call to arms and forwarded the letter to Wang Gong. At the same time, Wang's general, Liu Laozhi swiftly crushed the rebellion and sent Wang Xin into hiding. Wang Gong submitted a memorial to demote himself for causing the rebellion, but the court did not permit it.

=== Second insurrection (398) ===
Having survived the whole ordeal, Sima Daozi took steps to defend himself against Wang Gong and Yin Zhongkan. He made his cousin, the Prince of Qiao, Sima Shangzhi, his new trusted confidant, and for further external support, he appointed Wang Guobao's half-brother, Wang Yu (王愉) as the Inspector of Jiang province and ceded four commanderies of Yu province to him. However, Yu Kai was angry that he was forced to cede part of his territory, so he sent his son, Yu Hong (庾鴻) to persuade Wang Gong to campaign against Sima Shangzhi and his brothers for their despotic rule. Wang Gong agreed to Yu Kai's proposal and allied himself with Yin Zhongkan and the Inspector of Guang province, Huan Xuan. The two acclaimed Wang Gong as their leader and set a date to march onto Jiankang.

Afterwards, Yin Zhongkan sent a letter secretly stored in an arrow shaft to Wang Gong through Yu Kai, but the silk that was used to write the letter appeared deform and crooked. Wang suspected that Yu Kai had forged the letter, and recalling how Yin had waited until the last moment to raise troops during the previous year's insurrection, he felt that Yin would once again delay in providing military support. Therefore, Wang Gong decided launch his uprising earlier than the intended date, despite the remonstration of Liu Laozhi. He sent out another memorial stating his intention to remove Wang Yu along with Sima Shangzhi and his brothers from power.

At the advice of his son, Sima Yuanxian, Sima Daozi prepared for war and appointed Yuanxian as Commander of the expeditionary force to resist Wang Gong. Wang had grown arrogant from his victory against Wang Guobao, and though Liu Laozhi was a veteran general who made many military contributions for him, Wang insisted on treating him as a mere subordinate Sima Yuanxian was aware of Liu's dissatisfaction with Wang, so he ordered the Administrator of Lujiang, Gao Su (高素) to persuade him to defect, promising him Wang's offices and titles in return. Wang Gong's Army Advisor, He Danzhi (何澹之), discovered their collusion and attempted to warn his superior, but Wang knew about He's enmity with Liu and thought nothing of it.

Wang Gong held a banquet for Liu Laozhi and proclaimed him before the entire army as his elder brother. He entrusted Liu with his best troops and equipments to lead the vanguard with his fellow general Yan Yan (顏延). When Liu Laozhi reached Zhuli (竹里; north of present-day Jurong, Jiangsu), he had Yan Yan killed and surrendered to Sima Daozi before ordering his son, Liu Jingxuan and the Administrator of Dongguan, Gao Yazhi to launch a surprise attack on Wang Gong. Wang was leaving his city to review his troops at the time when he was ambushed and routed by Liu Jingxuan. Wang Gong tried to flee back into his city, but found that the gate had been closed by Gao Yazhi, forcing him to escape on horseback to Qu'a. Wang was not used to horseriding as he developed sores on his inner thigh. Along the way, he met his former official, Yin Que (殷確), who offered to bring him to Huan Xuan by boat. Wang Gong accepted, but when he arrived at Changtang Lake (長塘湖; in present-day Changzhou, Jiangsu), his whereabouts was reported by a merchant, and he was subsequently arrested.

== Death and posthumous honours ==
Wang Gong was sent to Jiankang and executed at Ni Dyke (倪塘; in present-day Jurong, Jiangsu). Prior to his execution, Wang Gong was said to have shown no fear, reciting Buddhist scriptures and straightening his beard and sideburns. He said to his executioner, "I was blinded by trust, which led me to this predicament. My true intention had always been to uphold my loyalty to the state. My only wish now is for future generations to remember Wang Gong." Wang Gong's sons, brothers and followers were also executed, and after his death, his family was left impoverished, only possessing his books.

During his arrest, Wang Gong was able to meet a former colleague, the Magistrate of Hushu County, Dai Qizhi (戴耆之). He privately told Dai that he had a son, Wang Tanheng (王曇亨), who was not known to the public yet and was hiding at his wet nurse's home. He urged Dai to place his son under Huan Xuan's care, so Dai had him sent to Xiakou (夏口; in present-day Xinzhou, Wuhan). Huan Xuan raised Wang Tanheng and even built a funeral hall for him to mourn his father. After Huan Xuan defeated Sima Daozi and became Emperor An's regent in 402, he petitioned to the court to rehabilitate Wang Gong's image. Wang Gong was posthumously appointed Palace Attendant and Grand Protector, and was given the posthumous name of "Zhongjian" (忠簡).
