= Sun En =

Sun En (Chinese: 孫恩; died April or May 402) courtesy name Lingxiu (灵秀), was a native of Langya (in modern-day Shandong) who rebelled against the Eastern Jin dynasty of China.

== Life ==
A member of Sun Xiu's clan, he joined his uncle Sun Tai (孫泰), who was regarded as a magician member of the Way of the Five Pecks of Rice movement, sharing their revolutionary aspirations.

In late 398, (Note: The Chinese year 398 ends on 21 Feb 399 in the Julian calendar.) Sun Tai had become a friend of Sima Yuanxian, and had gathered a great following due to his magic. Sun Tai was then exposed as planning a plot to take over the central government, and Sima Daozi ordered Sima Yuanxian to trap Sun Tai and execute him. Sun En fled to Zhoushan Island and planned revenge.

When Sun Tai was put to death, Sun En took the lead himself. At the head of a considerable force, Sun En captured Kuaiji (modern Shaoxing, Zhejiang province) and proclaimed himself General of the East (征東將軍), giving to his followers the title of "Immortals" (長生人). After a long struggle, with alternating fortune, he found himself without resources and committed suicide by drowning himself in the sea. Although Lu Xun, Sun En's brother-in-law and descendant of Lu Zhi, (Note: Lu Xun was a great-grandson of Lu Chen, grandson of Lu Ting, grandson of Lu Zhi.) continued to lead the rebellion, the rebellion was eventually put down by Liu Laozhi and others. The rebellion caused massive devastation and major loss of life, including that of many civilians, to the point where whole cities were almost completely deserted.

== See also ==
- List of rebellions in China#Eastern Jin dynasty
- Xie Daoyun
