= Kunlun (disambiguation) =

The Kunlun Mountains is a large mountain range between the Tibetan Plateau and the Tarim Basin in western China.

Kunlun may also refer to:

== People ==
- Kunlun (崑崙 or 昆侖), also Juelun (掘倫), a general term for Southeast Asians and Southeast Asia (particularly Champa and Island Southeast Asia) in Chinese historical records; the term later included enslaved Negritos, Papuans, and Africans.

- Kunlun Nu, a wuxia romance about a Negrito slave from Southeast Asia
- K'un-lun po (崑崙舶), or Kunlun bo, ancient sailing ships of the Austronesian traders from Island Southeast Asia described in Chinese records in the Han Dynasty

== Places ==
- Kunlun (mythology), a mountain in Chinese mythology
- Kunlun Fault, a geological fault along the Kunlun Mountains
- Kunlun Pass, Guangxi, China
- Kunlun Station (Antarctica), a Chinese research station
- Kunlun hydrothermal field, a field of around twenty hydrothermal vents (white smokers) in the Pacific ocean, at 11.1 square kilometers (4.3 square miles)

== Other uses ==
- Kunlun Energy, a Chinese oil and gas company
- Kunlun Fight, a Chinese Kickboxing promotion
- Kunlun School, a fictional martial arts school in wuxia fiction
- Kunlun Shan (998), a Chinese ship
- 3613 Kunlun, a main-belt asteroid
- Huawei KunLun Mission Critical Server
