= Yin Zhongkan =

Chinese Eastern Jin dynasty official (died 400)

- 殷仲堪

Inspector of Jing province (荊州刺史)
- In office 392 – 400
- Monarch: Emperor Xiaowu of Jin/Emperor An of Jin

Personal details
- Born: Unknown Xihua County, Henan
- Died: c.January 400 Jingzhou, Hubei
- Spouse: Wang Yingyan (王英彦) (Note: "Yingyan" was Lady Wang's courtesy name; she was from the Wang clan of Langya, and a daughter of Wang Linzhi. Wang Linzhi was a son of Wang Biaozhi (王彪之), who has a biography in vol.76 of Jin Shu.)
- Children: Yin Jianzhi; Yin Kuangzhi
- Parent: Yin Shi (father)

Yin Zhongkan (Note: It is unknown if "Zhongkan" was his name or courtesy name; this is the only name recorded in his biography in Jin Shu.) (died c.January 400), was an official and military general of the Jin dynasty (266–420). He was a confidant of Emperor Xiaowu of Jin, who was appointed as Inspector of Jing province to counter the growing power of the Prince of Kuaiji, Sima Daozi in the imperial court. After Emperor An ascended the throne with Sima Daozi as his regent in 396, Yin joined forces with the Inspector of Qing and Yan provinces, Wang Gong in leading troops against the capital, Jiankang to pressure Daozi into purging his associates. However, when the second insurrection in 398 saw Wang assassinated by his own general, Liu Laozhi, Yin was forced to reach a compromise with the court whereby he retained his position in Jing, but had to share power with his generals, Huan Xuan and Yang Quanqi, who were appointed Inspector of Jiang province and Inspector of Yong province respectively.

Yin maintained an uneasy alliance with Huan and Yang. Though the two mutually saw Huan as a threat, Yin was also highly suspicious of Yang and hesitated to take any military action out of fear of being betrayed. In the end, Huan Xuan took advantage of a famine in Jing to attack Yin's base at Jiangling in 399. Yang attempted to relieve Yin, but was captured and killed by Huan's forces, and Yin soon suffered the same fate.

== Background, early life and career ==
Yin Zhongkan was from the Yin clan of Chen Commandery as the grandson of the minister of ceremonies, Yin Rong (殷融) and the son of the Administrator of Jinling, Yin Shi (殷師). Yin Shi was also a cousin of Yin Hao, the Jin commander who led two expeditions against the northern barbarian states before he was exiled in disgrace. (Note: Yin Rong was Yin Hao's uncle.) A talented writer and orator, Yin Zhongkan became a celebrity among scholars for his Qingtan discussions. He was also a devout follower of the Taoist Way of the Celestial Masters since his childhood and enjoyed reading the Tao Te Ching. Yin received his first position within the government as an assistant scribe.

In 379, during the war against the Former Qin, the general Xie Xuan invited Yin Zhongkan to serve as an Army Advisor. At the time, Yin also received an offer from the court to serve as a Master of Writing, but he declined and became a member of Xie's staff. Xie made him a chief clerk and treated him with utmost respect. Yin once wrote to Xie that, in conjunction with his military efforts, he should also prioritize in winning the hearts of the northerners through altruistic and humane policies, which Xie strongly agreed.

Yin Zhongkan later served as the Administrator of Jinling, where he issued several decrees that were described as reasonable. He obliged the people to report all birthing of sons and forbade prolonged delays in burials. He also abolished the practice of holding a soldier's parents as hostage, which was previously done so to deter them from deserting. Yin became famous at this time for his filial piety, as while serving in office, he took exceptional care of his father, Yin Shi, who suffered from bad health for many years. He even went as far as studying medicine for a cure and went blind in one of his eyes as he often rubbed away his tears while his hands were still covered in medicine. After his father's death, Yin resigned from his position to carry out his mourning period.

At the end of the period, he was summoned by Emperor Xiaowu of Jin to serve as the palace cadet to the crown prince. Yin developed a trusting relationship with the emperor, and he was soon appointed Gentleman of the Yellow Gate.

== As Inspector of Jing province ==
Emperor Xiaowu was embroiled in a power struggle with his brother, the Prince of Kuaiji, Sima Daozi, who wanted to monopolize power in the imperial court for himself. To counter his brother's growing influence, the emperor sent several of his confidants out of the capital, Jiankang, to serve as commanders in neighbouring provinces with the aim of providing him external support. In 392, with the death of the inspector of Jing province, Wang Chen (王忱), Yin Zhongkan was stationed at Jiangling after he was appointed by Emperor Xiaowu to replace Wang and given the additional offices of chief controller of military affairs in the provinces of Jing, Yin and Ning and General Who Inspires Might.

Due to Yin's reputation, many of the officials and commoners in Jing initially welcomed his administration. Shortly after taking office, Yin was lenient with the law, but at the same time committed small act of kindness and generosity to win over the locals. On one occasion, he spared an official from death after he was found lying about preparing a funeral for his father who had long passed, as he argued that the penalty was only reserved for those who lied while their parents were still alive. At the time, it was against the law and etiquette to adopt children with different surnames, so Yin stipulated childless individuals with adopted children can only have one person to preside over ancestral rites and were not allowed to register for separate households to evade corvée labor.

Later, when the Administrator of Jianwei, Bian Bao (卞苞), plotted to rebel in Yi province, Yin Zhongkan had him executed and reported to the court. The court felt that Yin could have detected Bian's treachery much earlier, and so he was demoted to General of Hawkish Display. Not long after, a flood occurred which affected thousands of households in Jiangling. Yin was charged with not taking adequate care of the dikes and was further demoted to General Who Pacifies the Distance.

Yin also had to worry about Huan Xuan, the son of the powerful general, Huan Wen who was living in exile at his fiefdom in Nan Commandery. Huan Xuan's clan had ruled Jing province for decades and maintained a strong presence in the region even after the death of Huan Wen and several other of their prominent members. The people of Jing respected and feared the Huan clan even more than Yin Zhongkan. Not wishing to offend him, Yin Zhongkan befriended Huan, who went along as he wanted to make use of Yin's military power. In 396, Emperor Xiaowu was assassinated, and he was succeeded by his son, Emperor An with Sima Daozi as his regent. Yin was offered a promotion as Champion General, but declined.

=== Wang Gong's First Insurrection ===
In 397, the Inspector of Qing and Yan provinces, Wang Gong planned to march onto Jiankang to force Sima Daozi into deposing his corrupt advisor, Wang Guobao. He sent envoys to Yin Zhongkan inviting him to join forces. Huan Xuan, sensing an opportunity to rise through the ranks, persuaded Yin to accept the alliance and acclaim Wang as the leader. Huan's proposal was opposed by Yin's cousin, Yin Ji (殷覬) and the chancellor of Nan Commandery, Jiang Ji (江績), but Yin had Jiang replaced with the general, Yang Quanqi, which prompted Yin Ji to feign illness and resign. Yin Zhongkan also tried to convince the Inspector of Yong province, Xi Hui to join, but he refused.

Yin Zhongkan remained undecided, but when Wang's envoys arrived, he willingly accepted Wang's proposition. He observed that Wang's base at Jingkou was closer than Jiankang, while sending troops all the way from Jing province would be difficult and time-consuming. Therefore, Yin did not make any military preparations early on. Only after he received news that Sima Daozi had killed Wang Guobao that he took action, but Sima Daozi wrote him a letter ordering to stop as him and Wang Gong had made peace, so he ordered his forces to withdraw.

=== Wang Gong's Second Insurrection ===
In 398, Wang Gong, at the urging of the Inspector of Yu province, Yu Kai once again raised his armies to march against Sima Daozi, this time to pressure him into removing the Inspector of Jiang province, Wang Yu (王愉) and the Prince of Qiao, Sima Shangzhi and his brothers. They invited Yin Zhongkan to join them, and this time, Yin confidently agreed, remembering Wang' s success from the previous year. He immediately sent Yang Quanqi and Huan Xuan, now the Inspector of Guang province but still remained in Jing, to lead the vanguard while he commanded the rear to act as reserves. However, when he reached Wuhu, he received news that Yu Kai had been defeated while Wang Gong was assassinated by his general, Liu Laozhi. Yang Quangqi and Huan Xuan were alarmed when they saw Liu Laozhi approaching with the elite Beifu army and promptly fell back to Caizhou (蔡洲; southwest of present-day Nanjing, Jiangsu). On the other hand, the imperial court was unsure of the true strength of the rebel forces, so were also reluctant to engage.

Huan Xuan's cousin, Huan Xiu, who was serving at the capital as Guard General of the Left, proposed to Sima Daozi a plan to entice Huan Xuan and Yang Quanqi into rebelling against Yin Zhongkan. Following Huan Xiu's suggestions, Sima Daozi sent out Yin Zhongkan's uncle, Yin Mao (殷茂) to announce an edict appointing Huan Xuan as the Inspector of Jiang province, Yang Quanqi as the Inspector of Yong province and Huan Xiu as the Inspector of Jing province while demoting Yin Zhongkan to Inspector of Guang province.

Huan Xuan and Yang Quanqi were pleased with their new positions, but Yin was furious. He ordered Huan Xuan to quickly advance onto Jiankang, but Huan hesitated as he was considering on turning back. Yin also received news from his younger brother, Yin Yu (殷遹), that Yang Quanqi accepted the appointment. Alarmed, Yin immediately withdrew from Wuhu towards Jing province, and sent messengers to Huan and Yang threatening to kill their entire families when he return to Jiangling unless they follow his orders. Huan and Yang hastily gathered with Yin at Xunyang, where the three swore an oath to disobey the court's order and to bring justice for Wang Gong.

The court in panic issued an edict dismissing Huan Xiu and restoring Yin Zhongkan to his position while allowing Huan Xuan and Yang Quanqi to retain their new positions. The three commanders were satisfied with the new arrangements, agreeing to reconcile with the court and return to their respective outposts. The Inspector of Yong province, Xi Hui, plotted to rebel in a bid to keep his position, but Yang Quanqi foiled his plans and sent him to Jiankang as a prisoner with his sons. When they reached Yangkou, Yin Zhongkan secretly had them killed and claimed that they had been attacked by the Man tribes.

=== Struggle with Huan Xuan and death ===
Though the three were allies, both Yin Zhongkan and Yang Quanqi were wary of Huan Xuan's ambitious and unruly nature. Yang wanted to attack Huan on numerous occasions, even during the oath ceremony at Xunyang. However, Yin, who knew he was not as militarily capable as the other two, was also worried that Yang and his brothers may grow too powerful once Huan is eliminated, so he always forbade Yang from acting. Huan was well aware of Yang's hatred for him, so he had troops stationed at Xiakou (夏口; in present-day Wuhan, Hubei) to defend himself.

In 399, Huan Xuan sent a petition to the court requesting the expand his jurisdiction. The court, hoping to sow further discord among the three, transferred four commanderies of Jing to Huan Xuan's domain and had his elder brother, Huan Wei (桓偉) replace Yang Quanqi's brother, Yang Guang (楊廣) as Colonel of the Southern Man. Yang Guang wanted to oppose the court's decision, but Yin had him sent away and complied with the court's instructions. Yang Quanqi was agitated, and under the guise of sending troops to rescue Luoyang from besieging Later Qin forces, he planned to lead his troops with Yin Zhongkan to attack Huan Xuan. However, Yin, still suspecting Yang, not only refused to participate, but also sent Yin Yu north to block Yang's path. As Yang had too few soldiers to rebel on his own, he was forced to withdraw.

Later that year, a great flood occurred in Jing which left the entire province stricken with famine, which caused Yin Zhongkan to empty the granaries to send relief for affected victims. Huan Xuan took advantage of the situation to launch a campaign against Yin and Yang Quanqi, also using the siege of Luoyang as an excuse to bring forth his troops. He sent a letter to Yin threatening him to join forces in attacking Yang Quanqi and his brothers, or else he would attack Jiangling instead. Yin held Huan Wei hostage and sent Yin Yu with 7,000 naval troops to defend Western Jiangkou (西江口; southeast of present-day Jianli, Hubei). However, Yin Yu was defeated, and Huan Xuan went on to capture Yin's grain depot at Baling (巴陵; in modern Yueyang, Hunan).

Jiangling was shaken by Huan Xuan's string of success, and Yin had no choice but to use sesame seeds as his rations and urgently call Yang Quanqi for reinforcements. Yang was aware of the famine in Jiangling and suggest to Yin that he flee the city for his base in Xiangyang, where they can mount a proper defence. However, Yin, reluctant to abandon his province, lied to Yang by stating that he had recently gathered enough food to replenish Jiangling's granaries. Yang believed him and marched to Jiangling with his troops, but he soon learned the true situation in the city when he was only offer a meagre amount of rice. Furious, Yang refused to meet with Yin and set out for a decisive victory against Huan.

In the end, Yang Quanqi was defeated by Huan Xuan's forces, and Yin Zhongkan fled to Zancheng (酇城; in present-day Laohekou, Hubei). When he heard that Yang was killed by pursuing forces, he wanted escape to Chang'an and join the Later Qin, but he was intercepted by Huan's general, Feng Gai at Guanjun (冠軍; in present-day Dengzhou, Henan). He was then brought to Zhaxi (柞溪; in present-day Jingzhou, Hubei), where Feng Gai compelled him to commit suicide before killing his nephew, Yin Daohu as well. Later, his son, Yin Jianzhi led his funeral procession to Jiankang and had him buried in Dantu.

== Essays and fus ==
Aside from being an administrator, Yin Zhongkan and his cousin, Yin Ji were renowned literary talents from their time. A few of his letters can be found in his biography in the Book of Jin, notably his letter to Xie Xuan and his letter to Huan Xuan. There were at least 95 fascisles of miscellaneous essays and other works attributed to his name, but most of them were lost during the Song dynasty. Yin also composed a number of rhapsodies or fus, such as his Youyuan Fu (游園賦) and Jiangli Fu (將離賦), though only fragments of these fus survived.
