= Huan Xuan =

Chinese emperor in 404 (369–404)

Emperor of Huan Chu
- Reign: 1 January 404 – 19 June 404
- Born: 369
- Died: 19 June 404 (aged 35)
- Spouse: Empress Liu
Names
- Family name: Huán (桓); Given name: Xuán (玄)
Era dates
- Yǒngshǐ 永始 (1 January 404 – 25 June 404)
Posthumous name
- Emperor Wudao (武悼皇帝)
- Dynasty: Huan Chu (桓楚)
- Father: Huan Wen
- Mother: Lady Ma

Huan Xuan (Note: not to be confused with the kinsman of Huan Yi with a similar-sounding name. In the Tang-era Book of Jin, the pair's biographies are found in the same volume (vol.81).) (Chinese: 桓玄; pinyin: Huán Xuán) (369 – 19 June 404), courtesy name Jingdao (敬道), nickname Lingbao (靈寶), formally Emperor Wudao of Chu (楚武悼帝), was an Eastern Jin Dynasty warlord who briefly took over the imperial throne from Emperor An of Jin and declared his own state of Chu (Chinese: 楚; pinyin: Chǔ) in January 404, known in historiography as Huan Chu (Chinese: 桓楚; pinyin: Huán Chǔ), but was defeated by an uprising led by the general Liu Yu later in 404 and killed. He was the youngest son of Huan Wen.

== Early career ==
Huan Xuan was born in 369, as the youngest son of Huan Wen, then the paramount general of Jin, and his wife, Sima Xingnan (司馬興男) the Princess of Nankang, the daughter of Emperor Ming of Jin. (Note: An alternative account has him being born of Huan Wen's concubine Lady Ma, who was originally a songstress belonging to Yuan Zhen.) When Huan Wen died in 373, his title should have gone to his heir apparent Huan Xi (桓熙), his oldest son. However, Huan Chong, Huan Wen's brother whom Huan Wen entrusted the command of the army to, believed (correctly) that Huan Xi was in a plot with another brother of Huan Wen's, Huan Mi (桓秘), and another son of Huan Wen's, Huan Ji (桓濟), to assassinate him and take power, and so detained Huan Xi, Huan Ji, and Huan Mi. Instead, he declared that it was Huan Wen's desire that his title be passed to Huan Xuan, and so Huan Xuan, at age four, inherited the title of Duke of Nan Commandery, with the dukedom roughly corresponding to modern Jingzhou, Hubei.

As Huan Xuan grew in age, he became ambitious and wanted high posts, but the imperial government was highly suspicious of him and did not give him governmental posts until 391, when he became an assistant to Emperor Xiaowu's crown prince Sima Dezong (later Emperor An). Around this time, he had an encounter with Emperor Xiaowu's younger brother Sima Daozi, the Prince of Kuaiji, that went badly—as at one feast where Sima Daozi invited Huan Xuan as a guest, after Sima Daozi became drunk, he made the statement, "Was it not true that when Huan Wen became old, he planned treason?" Huan Xuan was so struck by the statement that he fell prostrate on the ground, fearing that Sima Daozi would kill him, and from this point he bore a grudge against the prince. Eventually, Huan Xuan became the governor of Yixing Commandery (義興, roughly modern Wuxi, Jiangsu), but felt that the post was not sufficient for his talent, and he therefore resigned and returned to his dukedom. Huan wrote a report to Emperor Xiaowu that was highly accusatory in tone; in the report, he claimed that Emperor Xiaowu had much to owe to Huan Wen. But, Emperor Xiaowu ignored the report.

During Huan Xuan's year at Nan Commandery, the people of the commandery were far more fearful of him than of the governor of Jing Province (荊州, modern Hubei and Hunan), Yin Zhongkan. Yin himself was very respectful and fearful of Huan as well. Effectively, Huan Xuan got his way with both the people and the governor, whatever he wanted.

== Gradual increase in power ==
After Emperor Xiaowu's death in November 396, (Note: Most (if not all) classical sources attributed Honoured Lady Zhang as both the mastermind and the executor of Emperor Xiaowu's murder.) Emperor An became emperor, and as he was developmentally disabled, Sima Daozi, as his uncle, served as regent. Sima Daozi was incompetent, and his trusted associates Wang Guobao and Wang Xu (王緒) took the opportunity to become wealthy from corruption. They feared the military powers that Yin Zhongkan and Wang Gong the governor of Yan (兗州) and Qing (青州) Provinces (Note: at that time, roughly modern central Jiangsu) possessed and persuaded Sima Daozi to reduce their domains. In response, Wang Gong sent messengers to Yin to discuss a campaign to seek the removal of Wang Guobao and Wang Xu. Huan Xuan, believing that a disturbance would help his cause, encouraged Yin to join Wang Gong's campaign. Wang Gong, believing that Yin would join him, then started the campaign, and quickly intimidated Sima Daozi into executing Wang Guobao and Wang Xu.

In 398, Huan Xuan requested the post of governor of Guang Province (廣州, modern Guangdong and Guangxi), and Sima Daozi, afraid that he would start a new disturbance with Yin, was quite willing to give him the post. Huan Xuan accepted the post but did not actually report to Panyu (番禺, modern Guangzhou, Guangdong), the capital of Guang Province.

Later that year, angry that Sima Daozi had seized part of his domain and given it to his associate Wang Yu (王愉), Yu Kai (庾楷) (Note: grandson of Yu Liang and brother of Pei Songzhi's mother) the governor of Yu Province (豫州, then modern central Anhui) persuaded Wang Gong and Yin to start another rebellion aimed at the removals of Wang Yu and another associate of Sima Daozi's, Sima Shangzhi (司馬尚之) the Prince of Qiao. However, not being actually a military man himself, Yin gave the commands of the forward armies to Huan Xuan and Yang Quanqi (楊佺期). They quickly advanced toward the capital Jiankang, but Wang Gong's general Liu Laozhi (劉牢之) then turned against him, capturing and executing him. With Wang Gong dead, Sima Daozi next tried to destroy Yin's coalition by ordering him deposed and giving his post to Huan Xuan's cousin Huan Xiu (桓脩), while giving Jiang Province (江州, modern Jiangxi and Fujian) to Huan Xuan and Yong Province (雍州, then modern northern Hubei and southwestern Henan) to Yang. Huan and Yang hesitated—not willing to turn against Yin immediately but wanting to accept the powerful posts. This caused an immediate withdrawal of Yin's troops, as Yin wanted to resecure his Jing Province, and soon forced Sima Daozi to return the post to him, but the seeds of dissension between Huan, Yin, and Yang were sown. Yin, apprehensive of Huan, soon entered into an alliance with Yang. However, he was also apprehensive of Yang, and therefore repeatedly stopped Yang's plans to attack Huan together.

Around the new year 400, Jing Province was suffering under a major flood, and Yin exhausted his food supplies for flood relief. Huan took this opportunity to make a major attack on Yin. Yang came to Yin's aid, but with the troops poorly supplied, Huan defeated both Yin and Yang and killed them, seizing their provinces, becoming effectively in control of two thirds of Jin territory. Huan became even more ambitious, and often had people offer him signs of fortune to try to show that he was being favored by the gods. He further wrote to Sima Daozi (Note: Daozi had, by this point, been displaced as regent by his son Sima Yuanxian.), accusing him of falsely having Wang Gong killed. In 401, at the suggestion of the strategist Zhang Fashun (張法順), Sima Yuanxian declared Huan a renegade and started a campaign against him, but was thoroughly reliant on Liu Laozhi for support. Liu, who was more concerned that Sima Yuanxian would become uncontrollable if he were victorious against Huan, again changed sides and joined Huan, who was initially fearful of attacking the capital but eventually did so at the urging of Bian Fanzhi (卞範之), soon reached Jiankang, and Sima Yuanxian's forces collapsed. Huan Xuan took over the control of the imperial regime, executed Sima Yuanxian, and exiled Sima Daozi (Note: Huan soon had him killed in exile, in early 403.). Not trusting the treacherous Liu, Huan stripped him of his military command, and Liu tried to rebel again—but his own army officers were tired of repeated rebellions and deserted him, and he committed suicide. Huan was now in control of the entire Jin empire.

Huan, however, soon displayed signs of over confidence and lack of actual fortitude. He had Emperor An issue an edict ordering him to advance north against Later Qin, but then had Emperor An issue another edict ordering him not to do so. Further, as he prepared his fleet, he set aside the treasures on a small ship, ready to flee if the battle turned against him. He was also hypercritical of his officials; any small error would draw a serious punishment from him. He was also very attached to treasures, and whenever he saw precious paintings, calligraphy, or houses, he would find some way to obtain them. Some ambitious individuals began to see signs of weakness in him and considered rising against him.

In 403, Huan Xuan had himself created the Prince of Chu and given the nine bestowments, both signs of coming usurpation. In winter 403, he had Emperor An yield the throne to him, and he became emperor of a new Chu state.

== Brief reign and death ==
Huan Chu (桓楚) 楚
- 403–404
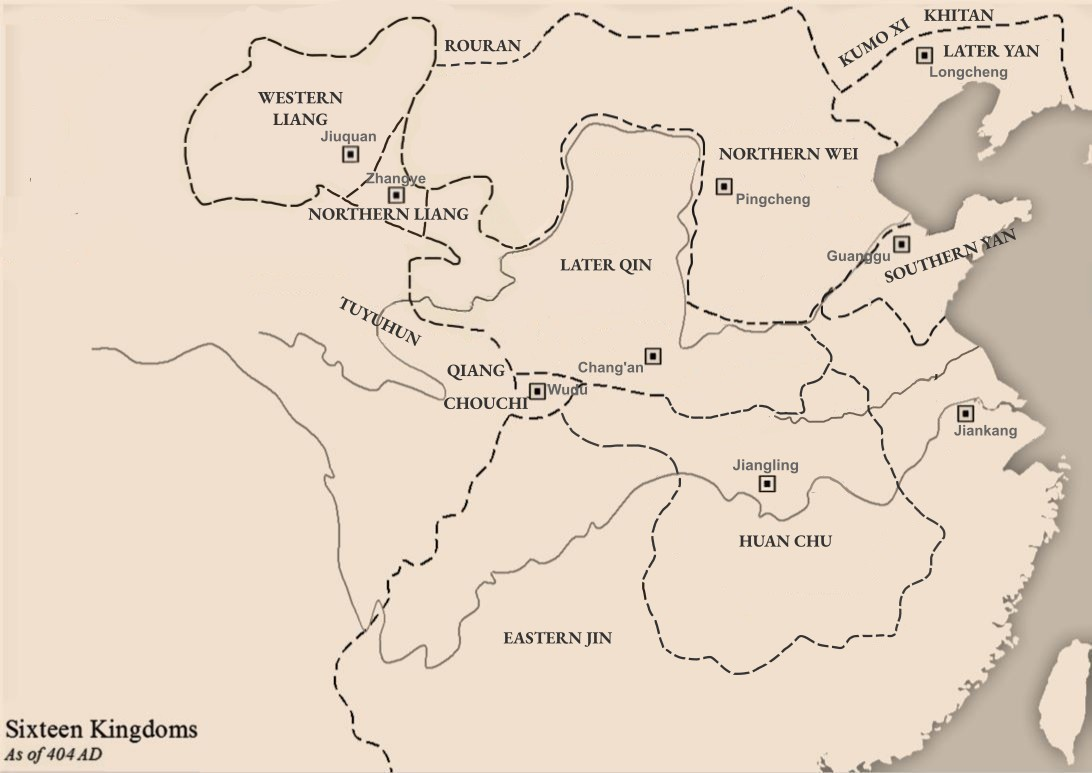
- Huan Xuan's rebellion as of 404 AD
- Capital: Jiankang; Jiangling
- Government: Monarchy
- Emperor
  - 404: Huan Xuan
- History
  - Emperor An of Jin forced by Huan Xuan to Yong'an palace: 22 December 403 (Note: renwu day of the 11th month of the 2nd year of the Yuanxing era)
  - Established: 1 January 404
  - Huan Xuan's death: 19 June 404
  - Disestablished: 25 June 404
Preceded by	Succeeded by
Jin dynasty (266–420)	Jin dynasty (266–420)
- Today part of: China

Huan Xuan posthumously honored his parents as emperor and empress, and he created his wife Lady Liu empress. He was, however, described as being constantly in fear after he became emperor, not being able to sleep well. He forced his officials to spend all day on minutiae, and he further started major palatial construction projects that imposed great burden on the people.

Initially, the only major official who dared to oppose Huan Xuan was Mao Qu (毛璩) the governor of Yi Province (Note: modern Sichuan and Chongqing). However, a conspiracy soon formed among the general Liu Yu, Liu Laozhi's nephew He Wuji, and Liu Yi the brother of Huan Xuan's official Liu Mai (劉邁). They were soon joined by a number of other conspirators, and in spring 404 they started the uprising against Huan from the cities of Jingkou (京口, in modern Zhenjiang, Jiangsu) and Guangling. Huan Xuan panicked, and as soon as his cousin Huan Qian (桓謙) the Prince of Xinye lost some relatively minor battles to Liu Yu, Huan fled west with Emperor An, yielding Jiankang to Liu Yu's coalition. Once Liu Yu was in the capital, he declared the reestablishment of Jin, even though the former Jin emperor was still in Huan's hands.

Huan Xuan soon arrive at his old headquarters of Jiangling. Fearful that his officials would no longer respect him, he dealt out even harsher treatments, which led to even greater alienation among his subordinates. He Wuji and Liu Yi quickly advanced on Jiangling, and Huan planned to flee again. His subordinate Mao Xiuzhi (毛脩之), Mao Qu's nephew, falsely informed him that Mao Qu would support him, and Huan Xuan headed west toward Yi Province. He soon encountered Mao Qu's troops, which made heavy bow-and-arrow attacks on his fleet, causing it to scatter. The officer Feng Qian (馮遷) boarded Huan's ship and beheaded him. His five-year-old son Huan Sheng (桓昇) was delivered to Jiangling and beheaded as well.

After Huan Xuan's death, his cousins and nephews would hold out at their various posts for more than a year, but eventually were all killed or forced to flee to other states. Huan Xuan's hopes of establishing a new dynasty was no more.

== Personal information ==
- Father
  - Huan Wen, grand marshal of Jin, posthumously honored as Emperor Xuanwu
- Main wife of father
  - Sima Xingnan (司馬興男), the Princess Nankang, daughter of Emperor Ming of Jin, posthumously honored as Empress Xuan
- Wife
  - Empress Liu (created 404)
- Children (Note: The Northern Wei general Huan Dan (桓誕), the chieftain of the Taiyang tribe (太陽蠻, in modern Huanggang, Hubei), who was created the Prince of Xiangyang in 472, claimed to be a son of Huan Xuan who had, at the time of his father's death, fled to the Taiyang tribe and later become chieftain. However, his claims were unverified.)
  - Huan Sheng (桓昇) (b. 399), the Prince of Yuzhang (created 403, executed 404)

== Notes ==
Chinese royalty
Recreated Title last held by Sima Wei	Prince of Chu; 403	Merged in the crown
Titles in pretence
Preceded by Emperor An of Jin	— TITULAR — Emperor of China; 403–404; Reason for succession failure: Eastern Jin restored	Succeeded by Emperor An of Jin
