= Wang Fahui =

Wang Fahui 王法慧

Empress consort of the Eastern Jin dynasty
- Tenure: 1 October 375 – 24 October 380
- Predecessor: Empress Yu Daolian
- Successor: Empress Wang Shen'ai
- Born: c.360
- Died: 24 October 380 (aged 19–20); Jiankang, Eastern Jin
- Spouse: Emperor Xiaowu of Jin
Posthumous name
- Empress Xiaowuding (孝武定皇后)
- Father: Wang Yun
- Mother: Lady Liu

Empress Wang Fahui (Chinese: 王法慧; pinyin: Wáng Fǎhuì; c.360 – 24 October 380), formally Empress Xiaowuding (Chinese: 孝武定皇后; pinyin: Xiàowǔdìng huánghòu; literally "the filial, martial, and quieting empress") was an empress during the Jin Dynasty (266–420). Her husband was Emperor Xiaowu. She was a niece of Wang Muzhi, another empress of the Eastern Jin.

== Life ==
When Emperor Xiaowu was due to marry, the regent Xie An wanted to look for a noble family that was meek and virtuous. Since he respected Wang Fahui's father Wang Yun (王蘊) and brother Wang Gong greatly, he personally visited Wang Fahui to examine her, and he was impressed with her politeness and beauty. On 1 October 375, he therefore selected her as Emperor Xiaowu's empress. He was 13 and she was 15.

Once she became empress, however, she became obsessed with drinking and was also proud and jealous, and Emperor Xiaowu was displeased. He therefore summoned Wang Yun, his father-in-law, to ask him to counsel his daughter to change her ways. Wang, during this meeting, became so fearful that he took off his hat to apologize. He then rebuked her, and she changed her behavior. She died in October 380 (predeceasing her father and husband) and was buried with honors due an empress. She did not have any recorded children. Perhaps in grief, Emperor Xiaowu did not have another empress after her death.

Chinese royalty
Preceded by Empress Yu Daolian	Empress of Jin Dynasty (266–420); 375–380	Succeeded by Empress Wang Shen'ai
Preceded by Empress Yu Daolian	Empress of China (Southeastern); 375–380	Succeeded by Empress Wang Shen'ai
Preceded by Empress Yu Daolian	Empress of China (Southwestern/Central); 375–380	Succeeded by Empress Gou of Former Qin
