= Wang Guobao =

Chinese Eastern Jin official (died 397)

- 王國寶

Left Supervisor of the Masters of Writing (尚書左僕射)
- In office 397 – 397
- Monarch: Emperor An of Jin

Personal details
- Born: Unknown
- Died: 29 May 397
- Parent(s): Wang Tanzhi (father); Fan Gai (mother; younger sister of Fan Ning)
- Courtesy name: Guobao (國寶)

Wang Guobao (c.mid-350s–29 May 397) was an official of the Jin dynasty (266–420). He came to prominence in the court of Emperor Xiaowu of Jin due to his family ties and close association with the emperor's brother and his cousin-in-law, the Prince of Kuaiji, Sima Daozi. His connection with Sima Daozi allowed him to rapidly rise through the government ranks while becoming involved in numerous scandals surrounding his corruption and misconducts. When Sima Daozi was appointed regent to Xiaowu's successor, Emperor An, Wang held joint power with him over the court, but his corruption soon became the pretext for the border commanders, Wang Gong and Yin Zhongkan, to raise their army in rebellion against Sima Daozi. To appease the rebels, Sima Daozi had Wang Guobao executed.

== Life ==
=== Early life and rise to power ===
Wang Guobao was born into the prominent Wang clan of Taiyuan as the third son of the high-ranking minister, Wang Tanzhi (330–375). His family formed a political alliance with the Xie clan of Chen, with Wang Guobao marrying the daughter of the prime minister, Xie An. However, he was not liked by his father-in-law, who found his conduct improper and refused to employ him to important positions. Disatissfied, Wang attached himself to his cousin's husband, Sima Daozi and slandered Xie to him, who then relayed to his elder brother, Emperor Xiaowu of Jin. As a result, relations between the emperor and Xie An were often strained before the latter died of natural causes in 385.

Sima Daozi was appointed to take up Xie An's role, and he appointed Wang Guobao as the Vice Director of the Palace Library. Wang was later assigned to Interior Minister of Langya while concurrently serving as Administrator of Tangyi and given the additional title of General Who Assists the State. He was then made into a Palace Attendant, and in 390, he was promoted to Prefect of the Palace Secretariat while concurrently serving as Commandant of the Central Army alongside Sima Daozi.

=== Controversies and impeachments ===
Fan Ning, a Palace Attendant and maternal uncle of Wang, detested his nephew's flattery towards Sima Daozi and submitted a petition to Emperor Xiaowu to have him demoted. Wang grew worried when he heard about the petition, so he told the official, Yuan Yuezhi (袁悅之) to ask a Buddhist nun to write a letter for Xiaowu's concubine, Consort Chen, stating that Wang was loyal and could be trusted. However, the emperor saw through their deception, and because Yuan had previously advised Sima Daozi to monopolize his power over the court, he had Yuan executed under that charge. In panic, Wang Guobao, through Sima Daozi, had Fan Ning slandered and sent away to serve as Administrator of Yuzhang.

In November 392, due to the death of his younger brother, Wang Chen (王忱), Wang Guobao requested a leave from office to accompany his mother for the funeral, which the court granted. However, he was later found lingering in Jiankang instead of attending the funeral, so the Palace Assistant Imperial Clerk, Chu Can (褚粲) had him impeached. Wang disguised himself as a maid to discuss with Sima Daozi about the matter and received a pardon in the end. Later, Chu Can impeached Wang again following an incident at a banquet where, in a drunken rage, he threw plates and musical instruments at the Assistant of the Left of the Masters of Writing, Zu Taizhi (祖台之). This time, he was dismissed from office.

Wang soon returned to the government, but was more arrogant and unrestrained than before. He built a house next to the Qingshu Palace (清暑殿), which greatly displeased Emperor Xiaowu. Fearing for his life, Wang began flattering the emperor and distancing himself from Sima Daozi. The prince was furious with Wang, and the two fell out following an incident where he openly confronted and berated Wang in the palace, even throwing his sword at Wang. On the other hand, the emperor grew to favour Wang and considered marrying his son, Sima Dewen to Wang's daughter. Before the marriage could come into fruition, however, Emperor Xiaowu was assassinated by his concubine, Lady Zhang in 396. Upon hearing his death, Wang went to the palace in an attempt to forge a will, but was stopped by the Palace Attendant, Wang Shuang (王爽; a distant cousin of Wang Guobao) and failed.

=== Wang Gong's Insurrection and death ===
Emperor Xiaowu was succeeded by his developmentally disabled son, Emperor An with Sima Daozi acting as his regent. Wang Guobao returned to Sima Daozi's side, and the two restored their old friendship. He recommended his notoriously corrupt cousin, Wang Xu (王緒) as the interior minister of Langya, and together, they were Sima Daozi's closest confidants, participating in court affairs and exercising real power. Wang Guobao was detested by everyone at the time, even by Wang Gong (elder brother of Wang Shuang), who was serving as the Inspector of Yan and Qing provinces at Jingkou.

In 397, Wang Guobao was appointed as Left Supervisor of the Masters of Writing placed in charge of the Personnel Bureau. He was later promoted General of the Rear and Intendant of Danyang, and Sima Daozi placed him in command of the soldiers of the Eastern Palace. As tension between Wang Gong and Sima Daozi continued to worsen, Wang Guobao urged the regent to reduce his cousin's military power. Before they could do so, Wang Gong, with the support of the Inspector of Jing province, Yin Zhongkan, finally raised his army at his base in Jingkou, proclaiming his intention of removing Wang Guobao from power.

When Wang Gong's proclamation reached Jiankang, Wang Guobao panicked and was at a loss. Wang Xu advised him that they should forge an imperial decree summoning the influential ministers, Wang Xun of the Wang clan of Langya and Che Yin and kill them to intimidate the other ministers into supporting him against Wang Gong. Wang Guobao agreed, but after summoning them, he hesitated and even asked the two for advice. He was advised not to resist and step down from power, thus undermining Wang Gong's pretext for rebellion and forcing him to withdraw. Guobao agreed, but after stepping down from office and admitting to his crimes, he quickly regretted this decision and reinstated himself through a false edict.

Meanwhile, Sima Daozi, desperate to avert the crisis, was willing to shift all the blame onto Wang Guobao to appease Wang Gong. He ordered the Prince of Qiao, Sima Shangzhi to arrest Wang and bring him before the Ministry of Justice. Wang Guobao was forced to commit suicide, while Wang Xu was beheaded in the marketplace. With Wang Guobao dead, Wang Gong had no choice but to return to Jingkou. The following year, Wang Guobao was posthumously restored to his original position by Sima Daozi after Wang Gong's defeat and death. However, when the general, Huan Xuan assumed Emperor An's regency in 402, Huan had Wang's family exiled to Jiao province in the far south.
