= Wang Muzhi =

Wang Muzhi 王穆之

Empress consort of the Eastern Jin dynasty
- Tenure: 29 October 361 – 22 February 365
- Predecessor: Empress He Fani
- Successor: Empress Yu Daolian
- Born: unknown (Note: As her father was born in c.309 and died in c.347, Lady Wang's birth year should be between 321 and 347.)
- Died: 22 February 365; Jiankang, Eastern Jin
- Spouse: Emperor Ai of Jin
Posthumous name
- Empress Aijing (哀靖皇后)
- Father: Wang Meng
- Mother: Lady Yuan

Empress Wang Muzhi (Chinese: 王穆之; pinyin: Wáng Mùzhī) (d. 22 February 365), formally Empress Aijing (Chinese: 哀靖皇后; pinyin: Āijìng huánghòu; literally "the lamentable and peaceful empress"), was an empress of the Eastern Jin dynasty. Her husband was Emperor Ai. She was an aunt of Wang Fahui, another empress of the Eastern Jin, and Wang Gong.

== Life ==
Wang Muzhi's father Wang Meng (王濛; 309-347) was at one time the chief assistant to prime minister Wang Dao. She became Emperor Ai's wife while he was still the Prince of Langye during the reign of his cousin Emperor Mu, and she carried the title of Princess of Langye. After he became emperor in July 361 following Emperor Mu's death, he created her empress on 29 October 361. She did not bear any children, and died in February 365. Emperor Mu would die in the following month, from complications of poisoning he suffered by taking pills given him by magicians in search of immortality. They were buried together with imperial honors.

== Notes ==
Chinese royalty
Preceded by Empress He Fani	Empress of Jin Dynasty (266–420); 361–365	Succeeded by Empress Yu Daolian
