= Honoured Lady Zhang =

Concubine and murderer of Emperor Xiaowu of Jin

Honoured Lady Zhang 張貴人
- Spouse: Emperor Xiaowu of Jin
- Clan: Zhang (張)

Honoured Lady Zhang (367? - after 396) was a concubine of the Jin dynasty (266–420), She was a concubine of Emperor Xiaowu, whom she murdered in November 396.

== Biography ==
Honoured Lady Zhang was Emperor Xiaowu of Jin's favourite concubine. Her origins were not recorded and she had no children; the emperor's devotion to her, as well as Honoured Lady Zhang's jealous nature, has been blamed for his failure to appoint another empress after the death of Empress Wang, as well as his lack of children by other concubines. The emperor spent so much time with Honoured Lady Zhang that it reportedly became difficult for outsiders to gain an audience with him.

== Murder of Emperor Xiaowu ==
The Book of Jin records that in 396, Honoured Lady Zhang was approximately 30 years old (by East Asian reckoning). Whilst she was drinking with the emperor one evening in November, he told her that he should discard her based on her age. Incensed, Honoured Lady Zhang went to bed with the emperor and killed him whilst he slept. Other written sources recorded that the emperor's comment was made in jest. After the murder, Honoured Lady Zhang bribed various people to declare that the emperor died in his sleep. There were no further records of her activities or when she died. (Note: The Book of Song (compiled before the Tang-era Jin Shu) recorded that when Emperor Xiaowu died, the masses spoke out that Lady Zhang had assassinated the emperor. Also, while there were no open punishments with regards to Emperor Xiaowu's murder, discrete punishments were meted out.)

== Media ==
- She is portrayed by Deng Sha in the 2017 television series General and I
