= Xi Chao =

Jin dynasty minister and Buddhist writer (336-378)

- 郗超

Gentleman-Attendants of the Palace Secretariat (中書侍郎)
- In office 371 – ?
- Monarch: Emperor Jianwen of Jin/Emperor Xiaowu of Jin

Chief Clerk of the Left of the Minister Over The Masses (司徒左長史)
- In office 373 – 378
- Monarch: Emperor Jianwen of Jin/Emperor Xiaowu of Jin

Gentleman of the Palace Secretariat (中書郎)
- In office ? – 378
- Monarch: Emperor Jianwen of Jin/Emperor Xiaowu of Jin

Personal details
- Born: 336
- Died: January or February 378
- Spouse: Zhou Matou (Note: According to a Xi Shi Pu annotation in A New Account of the Tales of the World, Lady Zhou was from the Zhou clan of Runan, and her father was Zhou Min (周闵), son of Zhou Yi. Shishuo Xinyu recorded that after Xi Chao died, Lady Zhou's brothers asked her to return to the Zhou clan; she refused to do so.)
- Relations: Xi Jian (grandfather); Xi Rong (brother); Xi Chong (brother)
- Parent: Xi Yin (father)
- Courtesy name: Jingxing (景興); Jingyu (敬輿)
- Childhood name: Jiabin (嘉賓)

Xi Chao (336 – January or February 378), courtesy name Jingxing or Jingyu, was a Chinese politician of the Jin dynasty (266–420). He was an advisor and close friend to the Jin Grand Marshal Huan Wen, aiding him in his northern expeditions and abdication of Emperor Fei of Jin. Xi later helped Huan Wen and his family consolidate their control over the state, but after Huan's death, he gradually lost influence to his rival Xie An until his death in early 378. Outside his career, Xi was an influential figure in the rise of Buddhism in China, as he was among the first of his time to try and cooperate the ideas of Confucianism and Taoism with the new teaching in his "Fengfayao (奉法要)". His name can be rendered as Chi Chao.

== Family and background ==
Xi Chao was from Jinxiang County in Gaoping Commandery. His grandfather, Xi Jian, was a famous general of the early Eastern Jin era who helped put down the rebellions of Wang Dun and Su Jun. Chao's father, Xi Yin (郗愔; 313 – 28 September 384) also served in the government and succeeded Jian after his death in 339, although Yin was said to have been not as talented as his father.

Xi Chao was highly regarded for his intelligence and way with words. It was because of this that he had many friends in intellectual circles. The Jin minister Xie An once praised him by claiming that he was better than his own nephews. Xi Chao was also compared to his contemporary, Wang Tanzhi as both shared the same kind of fame among the people.

== Service under Huan Wen ==
=== Early career ===
Xi Chao began his career at a very young age in 345 under Sima Yu as a simple official in his staff. He became a subordinate to the general Huan Wen some time after but no later than 356, as suggested in the biography of Yin Hao in the Book of Jin. Huan was a very cold and aloof man, rarely making friends with anyone. Xi Chao proved to be an exception, however, as he managed to gain Huan Wen’s respect through a conversation between the two. Henceforth, the duo were very trusting and supportive of one another.

In 363, Huan Wen made Xi Chao his Army Advisor and Wang Xun his Registrar. Due to the two of them being the general's favourites, the people of Jingzhou and those in Huan Wen's camp made a ditty about the three: (Note: Xi Chao was noted for having a full beard, while Wang Xun was said to be very short.)

髯參軍，

The bewhiskered aide-de-camp,

短主簿。

And the short records lad.

能令公喜，

Can make his lordship happy,

能令公怒。

Or make his lordship mad.

=== Huan Wen's 3rd northern expedition ===
In 369, Huan Wen was prepared to invade Former Yan. However, he was unsatisfied with the fact that Xi Yin was holding the province of Xuzhou. Huan Wen secretly resented Xi as he wanted Xuzhou for himself as that was where most of Jin's best soldiers were stationed. Xi Yin did not know of Huan Wen's attitude at the time, so he sent a letter to Huan asking to work together in support of the imperial family. Xi Yin also offered himself to be the first to move his soldiers across the Yellow River. When the letter reached Huan Wen's camp, Xi Chao took it and tore it. He then forged a new one, pretending to be his father, asking for his retirement and demanding to hand over his responsibilities in Xuzhou to Huan Wen. Huan was pleased and had Xi Yin transferred to Kuaiji before taking over his role as Inspector of Yanzhou and Xuzhou.

As Huan Wen marched towards Yanzhou, Xi Chao began to cast his doubts on the campaign. He pointed out to Huan Wen that the Bian River was too shallow and that Yan was too far from base which would make supplies hard to reach their army. Huan Wen chose to ignore his advice and marched on to Jinxiang, where he saw that the water around the area had all dried up. Huan Wen ordered Mao Muzhi to build a canal from the Wen River to let water flow into the Qing River and proceeded to sail into the Yellow River.

Here, Xi Chao proposed to Huan two plans. The first was that Huan Wen should quickly concentrate his forces towards Yan's capital in Yecheng. Xi Chao believed that the Jin army under Huan's command should be enough to demoralize and defeat them easily. Taking their capital would force the Murongs to move north while the common people around the area would surrender to Jin en masse. His second proposal was that they establish garrison lines near the rivers to prevent themselves from being cut off from supplies. Although they would have to delay the invasion, Xi Chao was confident that Jin would still win if they have a functioning supply line. Unfortunately, Huan Wen chose to ignore both of his suggestions. The campaign resulted in disaster as Huan was decisively defeated at the Battle of Fangtou by Murong Chui. Huan was too cautious to take on Yecheng and his plans to ensure a supply line failed as the canal he ordered Yuan Zhen to build was not completed in time.

== Abdicating Emperor Fei ==
=== Yuan Zhen's rebellion ===
Huan Wen returned to Jin embarrassed from what he considered his worst defeat. The reason he wanted the campaign was so that Yan's demise would allow him to receive the nine bestowments and take the throne. His latest defeat prevented this, and now he considered a different approach to becoming emperor. Saving face, he blamed Yuan Zhen for failing to secure his supply line. This in turn caused Yuan Zhen to rebel in Shouchun in 370. Huan defeated the rebellion in 371. Afterwards, he asked Xi Chao if this would be enough to clear his defeat at Fangtou, but Xi Chao believe it was not.

=== Smear campaign against Emperor Fei ===
One night, Xi Chao visited Huan Wen's home. He said to Huan Wen that he should act quickly, as Huan was already 59 years old and could die anytime now. If Huan Wen could not be emperor, then he should at the very least force the emperor to abdicate and replace him with someone he could control. Xi Chao and Huan Wen developed a scheme. They knew about Emperor Fei's controversial sex life, so they came up with a rumour that he was infertile. They claimed that his wives and concubines were sleeping with his favourite ministers such as Xiang Long (相龍) and Ji Hao (計好), and that his three children were not actually his. Huan Wen and Xi Chao spread the rumour among the common people, and no one knew what was right and what was wrong.

Huan Wen entered the capital the next month with an edict which he claimed was from Empress Dowager Chu. He then forced Emperor Fei to abdicate and replaced him with Sima Yu, whom Huan Wen had a tight grasp upon during his short reign. Xi Chao became Gentleman-Attendants of the Palace Secretariat.

== Reign of Emperor Jianwen and Emperor Xiaowu ==
=== Reign of Emperor Jianwen ===
Xi Chao held a significant amount of power in the court, acting as Huan Wen's eye to report him the situation in the government. Because of this, many in the court including Xie An feared him. Sima Yu, now Emperor Jianwen of Jin, lamented the Jin dynasty's fate. He once asked Xi Chao if that dynasty would be replaced by that of Huan Wen's, but he assured him that Huan Wen was only doing what was best for the state. As Xi Chao withdrew himself to see his father, the emperor sighed and told him to tell his father that his emperor had failed to protect the state.

Meanwhile, the Jin ministers, Xie An and Wang Tanzhi, formed an alliance to prevent too much power from falling into Huan Wen's hands. They often visited Huan Wen and Xi Chao's home to discuss important matters. One time, as Xi Chao and Huan Wen made a list on who to purge from the court, Xie An and Wang Tanzhi came visiting. Huan Wen hid Xi Chao behind his bed curtains but when a gust of wind revealed him, Xie An simply joked, "You can say that he is your 'guest within the curtains (入幕之賓)'!" (Note: This joke refers to Xi Chao's and Huan Wen's relationship, as during their time, a bed curtain was commonly associated with privacy, and any guest who entered it was said to have a very close connection with the host. Thus, a 'guest within the curtain' references friendship. This is also a pun, as the word '幕' ('curtain') was also used in the word "secretariat" (幕僚), which is a position that Xi Chao was holding at the time.)

=== After Huan Wen's death ===
Emperor Jianwen died just a year into his reign and was replaced by his son Emperor Xiaowu. However, Huan Wen would also die in 373, and Xi Chao found his power greatly diminished because of this. Xi took the role Chief Clerk of the Left of the Minister Over The Masses after Huan's death, but had to leave the government to hold a mourning session for his mother. This allowed Xie An to influence the court during Xi's absence. When he returned from his session, court decided to appoint Xi Chao Cavalier In Regular Attendance, General Who Declares Might and Prefect of Linhai, but he turned them all down.

Despite Huan Wen's family holding two-thirds of the empire, his brother and successor, Huan Chong had no imperial ambitions and stayed loyal to the Jin dynasty. In 375, Xi Chao tried to stop Huan Chong from giving up his power in Yangzhou to Xie An, but Chong persisted.

Xi Chao grew to resent the Xie family, particularly, Xie An and Xie Xuan, for their growing prominence in the state while his father slowly went down the ranks. In 377, the Former Qin state threatened the dynasty and there was no one leading the defense against them, so Xie An nominated his nephew Xie Xuan. When Xi Chao heard this, he unexpectedly accepted this outcome and praised the two Xies. The court was in disbelief as Xie Xuan at this point had never held such an important position. However, Xi Chao defended Xie Xuan by bringing up their time together with Huan Wen, stating that Xie Xuan had proved himself a good eye for talents. Years later, Xi Chao's argument bore fruit as Xie Xuan decisively defeated Qin at the Battle of Fei River in 383, leading to its hasty decline.

=== Death ===
Xi grew ill at the end of 377 and died shortly after. His father Xi Yin was a stalwart Jin loyalist but never knew about his son's schemes with Huan Wen. Before his death, Xi Chao was concerned that his father would be too grief-stricken by his death. He gave one of his students a chest that would stop him from doing so. After he died, Xi Yin was indeed heartbroken by his death and did not eat for days, so the student gave him the chest. In it were the plans that Xi Chao and Huan Wen made to overthrow the dynasty. His grief turned to anger, and he exclaimed, "My son should have died sooner!" Thus, Xi Yin no longer mourned him.

== Literary works ==
=== Calligraphy ===
Xi Chao was one of the distinguished calligraphers of the Eastern Jin period. In fact, five of his family members including Xi Jian were talented in calligraphy, and in the 8th century book about calligraphy, the "Shushu Fu (述書賦)", the writer Dou Ji (竇臮), listed the Xi family with the Xie, Wang and Yu clans as the four families that dominated the art during their time. According to the Liu Song dynasty calligrapher, Wang Sengqian, in his book, "Fashu Kao (法書考)", Xi's works were inferior to the "Two Wangs" (Wang Xizhi and Wang Xianzhi) but superior to that of his father Xi Yin in terms of beauty and compactness. Sengqian's one criticism for Xi Chao was that he lacked strength in his strokes. (Note: Xi Chao's cousin Lady Xi was Wang Xianzhi's ex-wife, per vol.80 of Jin Shu.)

=== Fengfayao ===
Xi Chao was a Taoist but grew infatuated with Buddhism, more specifically through the teachings of Zhu Fatai and Zhidun. He attempted to harmonize the orthodox concepts of Buddhism and Confucianism into one and even wrote a book about it called the 'Fengfayao'. Due to the lack of translation of Buddhist texts, the Fengfayao contains many common misinterpretations held by most Jin officials and scholars at the time. Regardless, it was one of the most important pieces of Buddhist writing that contributed to its spread in the 4th century.

== Anecdote ==
=== Xi Yin's treasury ===
Xi Yin was a very frugal man and amassed a huge amount of gold in his treasury, but his son was generous and somewhat wasteful. One day, Xi Chao was talking with his father when Chao brought up the topic of his father's their finances. After some pestering, Yin decided to allow his son to use his treasury just for a day, thinking that he would only lose a small portion of the money. However, that day, Xi Chao distributed so much of the gold among his relatives and friends that by the time Xi Yin found out, the treasury was nearly exhausted.
