= Wuyi Lane =

Road in Nanjing Province, China

Wuyi Lane (Chinese: 乌衣巷) is located on the south side of Qinhuai River in Nanjing. During the Three Kingdoms period, it was the barracks of the army guarding the Stone City of Wu. The name Wuyi means black clothes. This was because the non-commissioned officers at that time always dressed in black. Later the aristocrats of Eastern Jin (317-420) gradually assembled at Wuyi Lane, making it popular and famous. In addition, Wang Dao and Xie An, the two founding fathers of Eastern Jin, once lived here. The poem Wuyi Lane, written by Tang poet Liu Yuxi is based on it. In 1997, the government of Qinhuai District restored Wuyi Lane and rebuilt Wang and Xie Former Residence 王谢故居 to commemorate Wang Dao and Xie An. It is built in Ming and Qing styles.

The poem:

《乌衣巷》 刘禹锡
朱雀桥边野草花，乌衣巷口夕阳斜。
旧时王谢堂前燕，飞入寻常百姓家。
Wuyi Lane
Beside the Zhuque Bridge wild flowers thickly grow,
Along the Wuyi Lane the sun is setting low.
Where once the swallows knew the mansions of the great,
They mow to humbler homes would fly to nest and mate.
--translated by Cai Tingan (蔡廷干)

Beside the Bridge of Birds rank grasses overgrow;
O’er the Street of Mansions the setting sun hangs low.
Swallows that skimmed by eaves painted in bygone days,
Are dipping now among the humble home's doorways.
--translated by Xu Yuanchong (许渊冲)
