= Wuyi =

Wuyi (Wade–Giles: Wu-i) may refer to:

== Places ==
- Wuyi Mountains (武夷山) in Fujian and Jiangxi
- Wuyi County, Hebei (武邑县)
- Wuyi County, Zhejiang (武义县)
- Wuyi Lane, historical street in Nanjing
- Wuyi, Anhui (乌衣镇), town in Nanqiao District, Chuzhou
- Wuyi, Hengshui (武邑镇), town in and seat of Wuyi County, Hebei
- Wuyi Avenue Subdistrict (五一大街街道), Qiaodong District, Zhangjiakou, Hebei
- Wuyi (五邑 "five counties") of Jiangmen, Guangdong

== Other uses ==
- ROCS Wu Yi (AOE-530), a fleet oiler and logistics ship of the Republic of China Navy (ROCN)
- Wu Yi of Shang or Wuyi, King of the Shang dynasty (12th century BC)
- International Workers' Day (May First), Wuyi in Chinese
  - Wuyi Square (disambiguation), to commemorate May First

== See also ==
- Wu Yi (disambiguation)
