= Hall of Mental Cultivation =

- Yǎngxīn Diàn (Chinese); 养心殿 (Chinese)
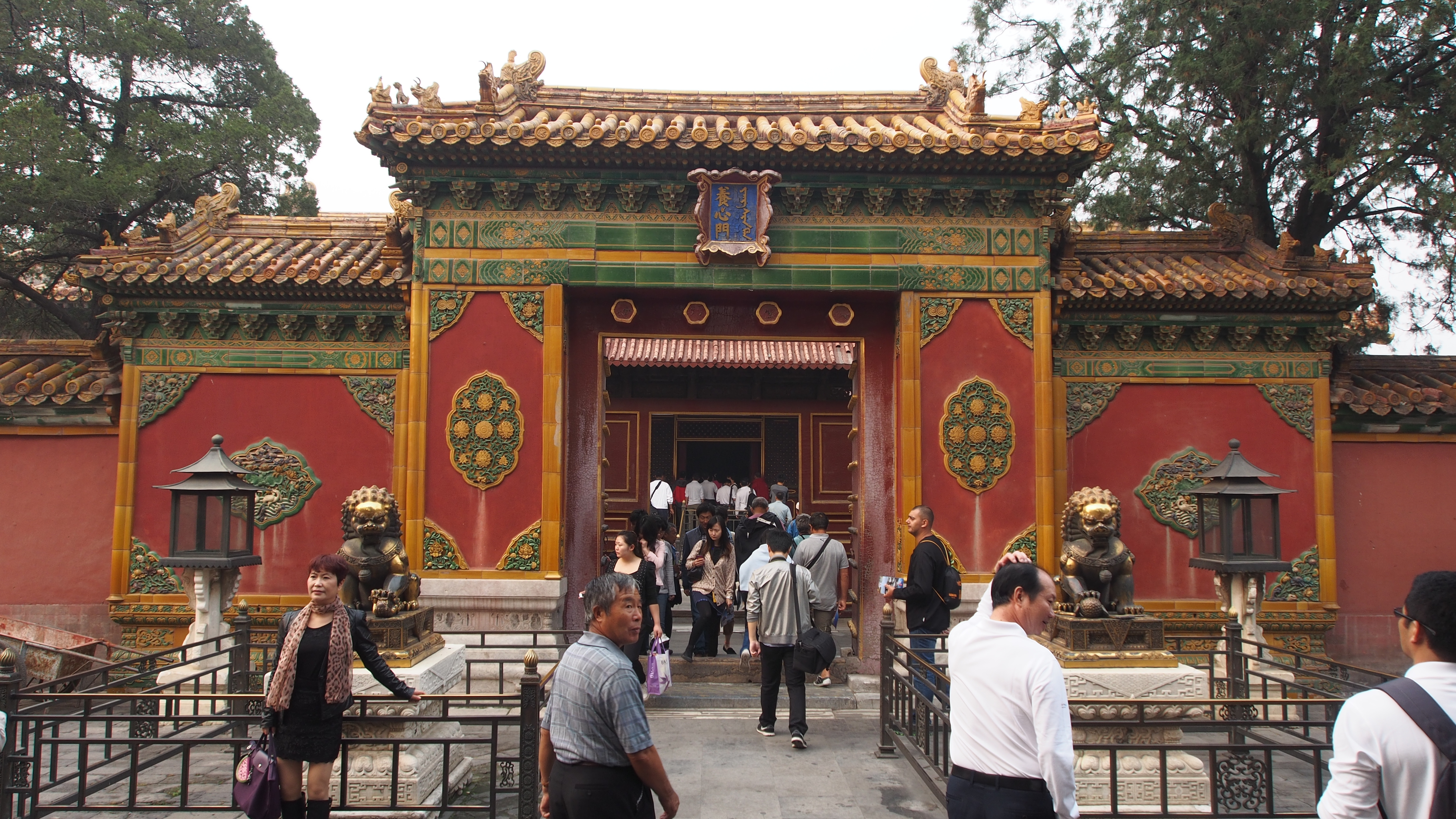
- Outside the Hall

- Location within Beijing
- 39.91835°N 116.38940°E
- Location: The Forbidden City
- Nearest city: Beijing

History
- Built: 1537
- Original use: Residence of the emperor, governance, administration
- Rebuilt: During the Qing dynasty

Site notes
- Restored by: The Palace Museum, Beijing
- Current use: Tourist destination
- Governing body: The Palace Museum, Beijing

The Hall of Mental Cultivation (simplified Chinese: 养心殿; traditional Chinese: 養心殿; pinyin: Yǎngxīn Diàn, Manchu: ᠶᠠᠩ
ᠰᡳᠨ
ᡩᡳᠶᠠᠨ yang sin diyan) is a building in the inner courtyard of the Forbidden City in Beijing, China. The hall is a wooden structure with dome coffered ceilings that was first built during the Ming dynasty in 1537, and was later reconstructed during the Qing dynasty.

During the early Qing dynasty, under the reign of the Kangxi Emperor, the hall was mostly used as a workshop, where artisan-made objects like clocks were designed and manufactured. From the reign of the Yongzheng Emperor during the 18th century, the hall was the residence for the emperor. Under the reign of the Qianlong Emperor until the fall of the Qing dynasty, the hall became the centre of governance and political administration. In the Western Warmth Chamber, the emperor would hold private meetings and discuss state affairs with his mandarins. After the death of Emperor Xianfeng, from inside the Eastern Warmth Chamber, empress dowagers Ci'an and Cixi would hold audiences with ministers and rule from behind a silk screen curtain during their regencies for emperors Tongzhi and Guangxu, who both succeeded to the throne as children in the second half of the 19th century.

The Hall of Mental Cultivation contained the Hall of Three Rarities, which stored art and cultural relics, and the Qianlong Emperor's collection of 134 model calligraphy works from the Imperial Collection. It also housed three ancient calligraphy artworks by ancient calligraphers Wang Xizhi, Wang Xianzhi and Wang Xun.

The hall's interior is decorated with polychrome paintings, glazed tiles, ancient thangkas paintings, and traditional wax paper decorations. From 2006, the Palace Museum instigated a research and conservation project aimed at restoring the hall and preserving its cultural relics, like thangkas.

In 2017, in anticipation of the hall's closure for restoration in 2018, the Palace Museum launched a digital exhibition about the Hall of Mental Cultivation.

== History ==
Construction on the Hall of Mental Cultivation concluded in 1537, during the 16th year of the reign of Jiajing Emperor which spanned from 1521 to 1567, during the Ming dynasty. During the reign of the Kangxi Emperor (1661–1722) during the early Qing dynasty, the Hall of Mental Cultivation was primarily used as an imperial workshop of the "Inner Court", or as an atelier for the newly established administrative body called the Department of Imperial Household Construction, or Zaobanchu. The Zaobanchu were responsible for manufacturing arts and crafts objects, "court utensils and paraphernalia." Such craft studios within the hall, established in 1693, stored "clocks, jade, arms and maps" and was dedicated to Chinese artisans who influenced and helped European crusaders in developing their glass and enamel craft techniques. From 1691, most of these craft workshops and ateliers were transferred to the Palace of Compassion and Tranquility (Cining gong) which was built in 1536.

== Use and purpose ==
Since the reign of the Yongzheng Emperor from 1723 to 1735, the main purpose of the Hall of Mental Cultivation was to house the emperor. The Yongzheng Emperor moved from the Palace of Heavenly Purity to the Hall of Mental Cultivation, since he felt uncomfortable sleeping inside the place where his father died. The hall also became the main place where the emperor carried out his administrative and political duties. The Hall of Mental Cultivation continued to stand as the political hub of the Qing dynasty up until 1912 after the abdication of the Xuantong Emperor, who had ascended to the throne in 1908.

During the early years of the Yongzheng Emperor's reign, part of the hall was dedicated to constructing clocks, many of which were designed by European artisans. The emperor would often describe his desired function and design of the clock, which would be sketched and then constructed according to the emperor's specifications, and always subject to his approval.

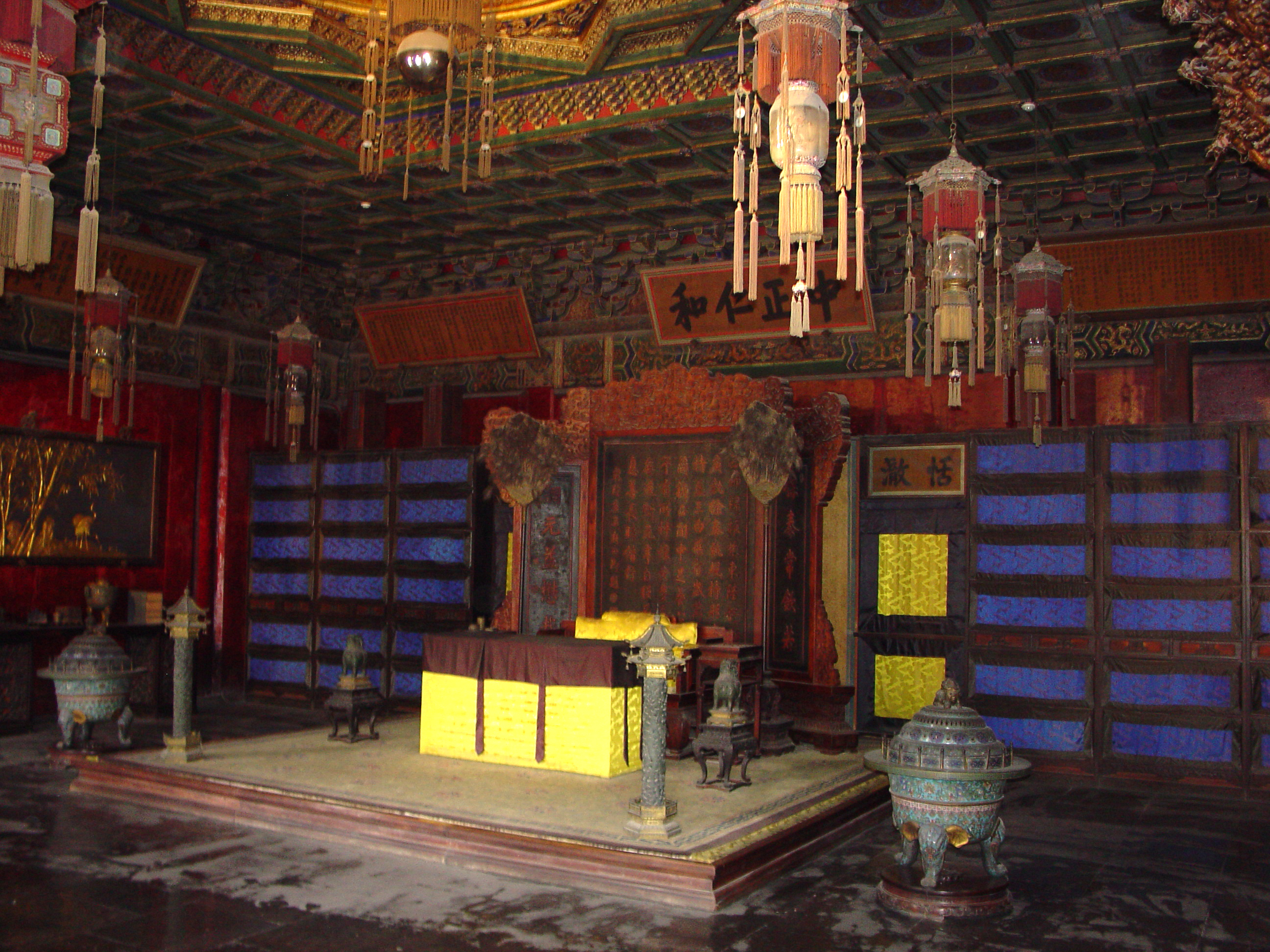
The emperor's study and office inside the Western Warmth Chamber, where he would conduct governmental and administrative duties, and consult his ministers.

=== Western Warmth Chamber ===
Also known as a nuange, the Western Warmth Chamber is inside the Hall of Mental Cultivation's front hall. During the Qianlong Emperor's reign during the middle-late Qing dynasty, this room became the epicentre of political and governmental activities. The emperor would read memorials and hold private meetings with his ministerial members. A private prayer room for the Qianlong Emperor, which was also known as the Buddha Room, was also constructed in 1747 and was two storeys tall.

=== Hall of Three Rarities ===
Constructed within the Hall's Western Warmth Chamber, the Hall of Three Rarities or Sanxitang was the Qianlong Emperor's study and was also dedicated to housing what are now deemed to be artistic and cultural relics. Inside this room, the Qianlong Emperor kept his calligraphy artworks. In particular, he stored three works by three significant calligraphers: Timely Clearing After Snowfall by Wang Xizhi from the Jin dynasty, Mid-Autumn by his son Wang Xianzhi, and Letter to Boyuan by Wang Xun, Xizhi's nephew. While keeping the original works, in 1747 the Qianlong Emperor ordered for these works as well as 134 other calligraphic works from the Imperial Collection to be carved into stone, and displayed in the nearby Pavilion of Reviewing the Past, or Yueguo lou, in Beihai Park, Beijing. Some of these calligraphic works formally housed within the Hall of Three Rarities are now archived in a collection at the Metropolitan Museum of Art, titled the Model Calligraphies of the Hall of Three Rarities.

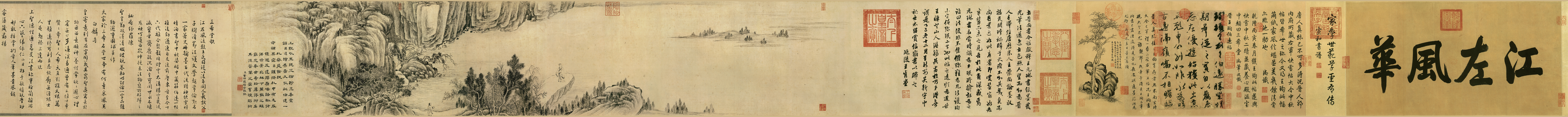
A Letter to Boyuan (伯遠帖) by calligrapher Wang Xun (王珣).

==== Timely Clearing After Snowfall ====
Written as a running script, the artwork "Timely Clearing After Snowfall" depicts a short letter written by Xizhi to his friend after a snowfall. According to the critic Chan Ching-fen from the Ming dynasty, the running script depicted in this artwork influenced the calligraphic style of Chao Meng-fu, a calligrapher from the Yuan dynasty.

==== Mid-Autumn ====
The model calligraphy, "Mid-Autumn", made of bamboo, employs a cursive script (Chinese: 草書; pinyin: cǎoshū) and only has 22 Chinese characters. After the fall of Chinese imperialism, the work was sold from the private, royal collections by dowager Jingyi, the consort of Emperor Tongzhi. However, in the 1950s, under the orders of Premier Zhou Enlai, China's Ministry of Culture re-acquired this work, together with Letter to Boyuan by Wang Xun, and it is now displayed at the Palace Museum.

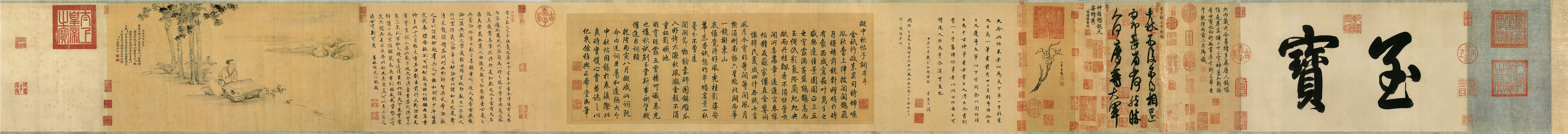
Mid-Autumn by calligrapher Wang Xianzhi.

=== Eastern Warmth Chamber ===
The Eastern Warmth Chamber was dedicated to Empress Dowagers Cixi and Ci'an. It was in this room that, during the late Qing dynasty after the death of her husband Emperor Xianfeng, Empress Dowager Cixi ruled China from "behind a silk screen curtain", engaging in official state affairs through and behind her son, the child emperor Tongzhi and the following emperor Guangxu.

From 1862 to 1866, while ruling behind the curtain and the child emperor Tongzhi, Empress Dowagers Cixi and Ci'an were also lectured about peaceful governance by academics from the Hanlin Academy. Using the biographies of former emperors and empresses as the blueprint for political success, these lectures were dedicated to teaching the two Empress Dowagers about how to effectively rule China.

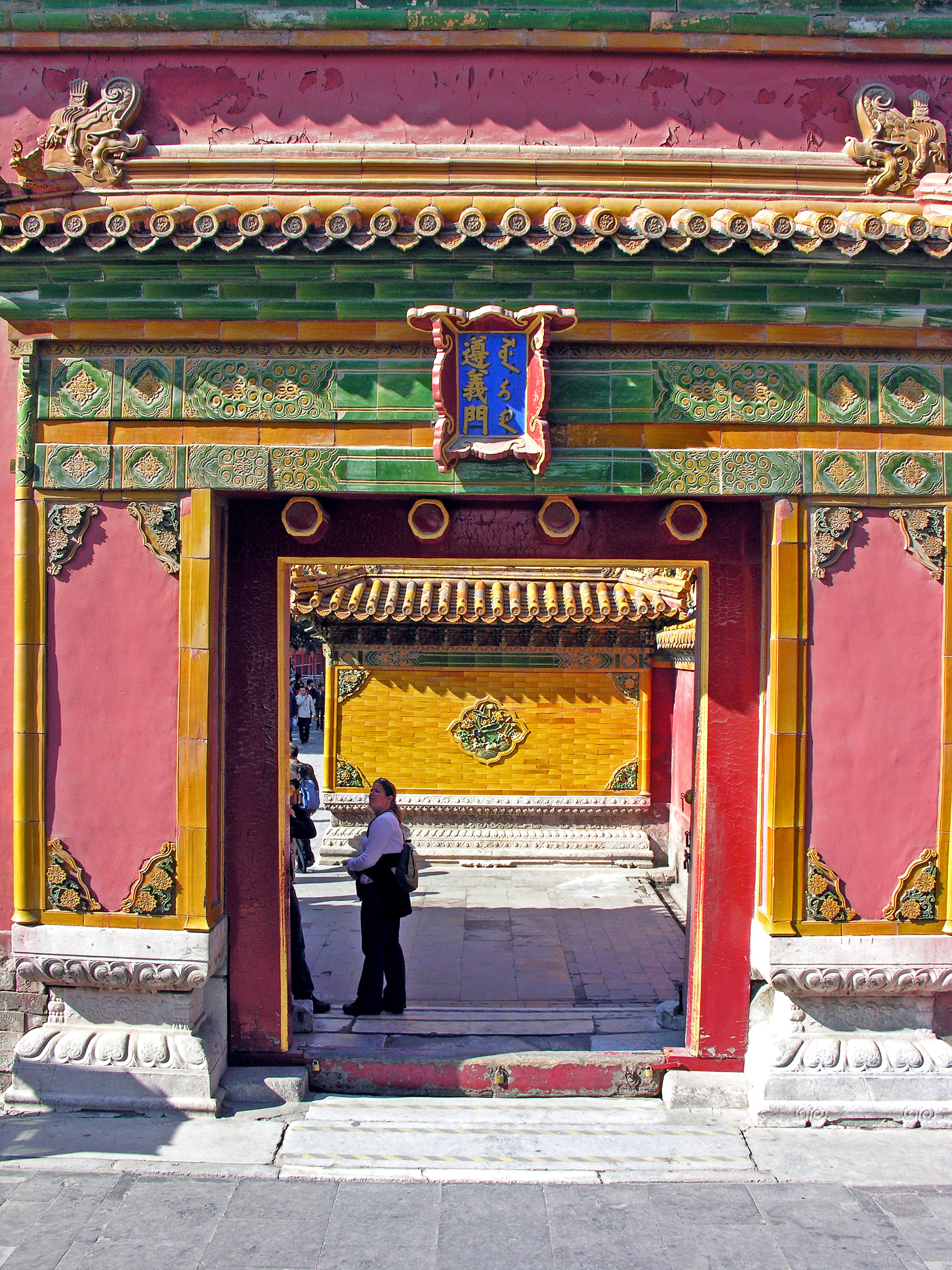
The Gate of Mental Cultivation.

=== Western Side Hall ===
This area of the Hall of Mental Cultivation was dedicated to the "consecration of tablets of deceased emperors."

=== Eastern Side Hall ===
This area served as a common Buddhist prayer hall.

=== Hall of Joyful Swallows ===
Found inside the rear hall inside the Hall of Mental Cultivation, the Hall of Joyful Swallows was reserved for the emperor's high-ranking concubines.

=== Gate of Mental Cultivation ===
The Gate of Mental Cultivation or Yangxinmen, was constructed in front of the Hall and faced southwards, and could originally only be opened to the emperor. Buildings in front of the Gate housed and were reserved for the emperor's eunuchs.

== Construction and architecture ==
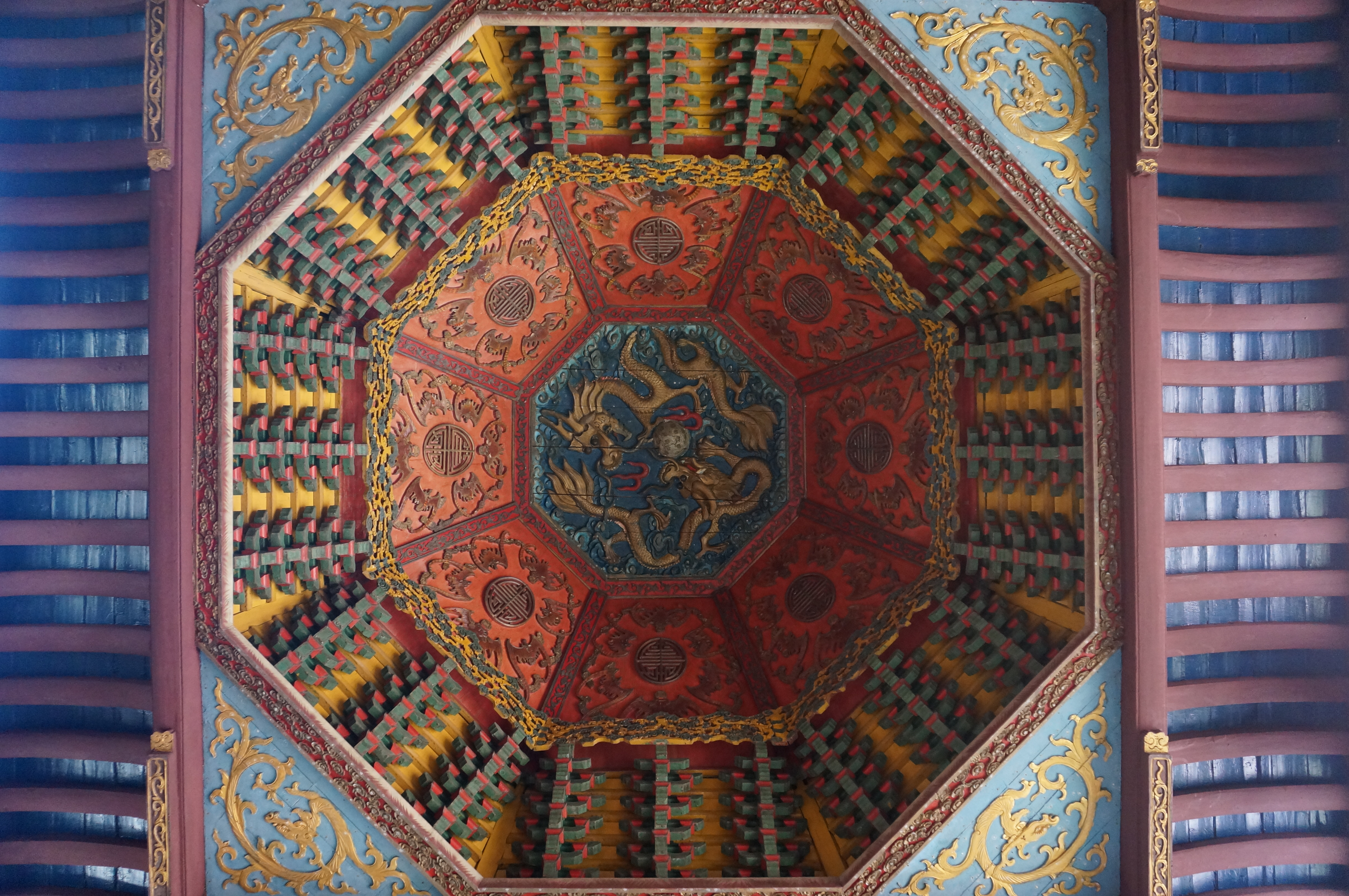
An example of an octagonal coffered ceiling or zaojing, in the Cao'e Temple, by the Cao'e River in Shangyu, China.

In a research experiment conducted in 2019 that aimed to uncover the technology utilised in constructing the royal buildings within the Forbidden City, Xu and colleagues discovered that the hall had been constructed with materials like "wood, black bricks, roof tiles and mortar." Wood was a common material in ancient Chinese architecture and was used to frame the Buddha Room, which had cross-shaped wooden walls, partitions, and frames, shaped like zig-zags. The mortar formulated during the construction of the hall contained raw materials like "calcite, quartz, hematite, muscovite, mullite, aragonite and gypsum", and plant fibres like "bamboo, jute, flax, hemp, ramie", and even sticky rice, blood, and plant juice.

Inside the main hall's central bay, the domed coffered ceilings exhibited traditional patterns like dragons and golden decorations (douba-zaojing), reflective of the architectural and artistic styles that pervaded the Ming dynasty. A product of Confucianism, a zaojing, (Chinese: 藻井; pinyin: zǎojǐng) or coffered ceiling, is shaped in either a square, octagon, or circle, and is placed in the centre of the ceiling. It was a common feature in ancient Chinese halls, palaces, religious temples, and was a physical representation of the "unity of heaven and man on the one hand, and a hierarchical society on the other."

Based on archaeological discoveries of Neolithic water wells pertaining to the Hemudu culture within the Yuyao, Zhejiang province, it has been found that the design and physical properties of the zaojing derives from early wooden water well structures. The zaojing's origins have also been linked to the designs of early skylights from ancient Chinese huts, particularly from the early Han dynasty.

=== Layout ===
The Hall of Mental Cultivation is shaped like an "H", or the Chinese character 'gong' (工) and occupies a space of approximately 3800m^{2}. Surrounding the Hall are the Grand Council offices and those of other significant government bodies.

== Interior design ==
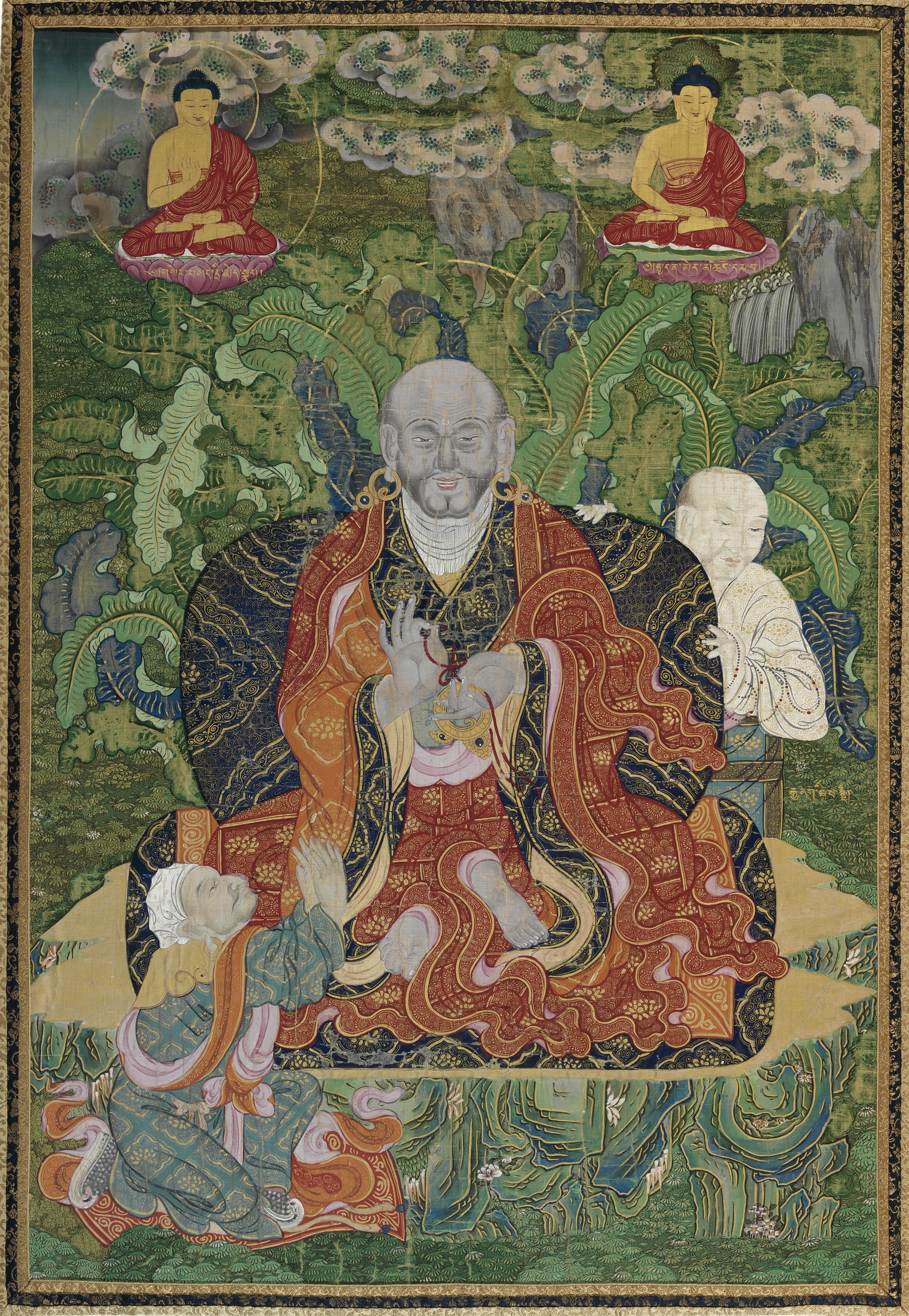
An example of a thangka from the Qianlong dynasty c. 1794

=== Decorative polychrome paintings ===
The decorative polychrome paintings like that of the "ridge tie-beam" of the main hall were created with mineral pigments like azurite and atacamite, and featured patterns and motifs reflective of the artistic style of the ruling dynasty at the time. For instance, during the Jiajing Emperor's sovereignty amid the Ming dynasty, common decorative patterns within such paintings included: the fangintoul, a sword tip with straight lines; a lengxian, a three-fold concave lined pattern; spiral flowers; and up-ward turned lotus bases.

=== Thangkas ===
Thangkas are cotton or silk artworks painted by Lamas who historically worked inside the Forbidden City and were often hung on the wooden walls of the Buddha Room.

=== Paper-based interior decoration ===
The walls and ceilings of the Hall of Mental Cultivation were decorated with many artworks created with biao hu (裱糊) a traditional handmade paper, lajan (蜡笺纸) a traditional handmade wax paper, and tie luo (贴落). A tie luo was a traditional Chinese calligraphy or painting and was popularised during the Qing dynasty, where it was often affixed in imperial palaces. Court painters drew the tie luo, which was then placed on top of the biao hu paper. Inside the hall was a dragon-embellished tie luo called Longevity (寿), made with lajan.

== Restoration and conservation ==
Since 2006, the Palace Museum commenced a research and conservation project aimed at maintaining and restoring the Hall of Mental Cultivation.

Given that the hall has rarely been open to the public, its quiet and dusty interior has become prone to widespread pest-breeding. This has made preserving cultural relics a greater challenge, given that such pests tend to target and destroy natural, organic materials like the ones the relics are often made with. In a study concerned with the conservation of cultural relics within buildings inside the Forbidden City, over the course of three years, Zhang and colleagues discovered that cultural relics inside the hall were at risk of decay, due to pests like the carpet beetle, silverfish, booklice, clothes moths, and the spider beetle. The relics that were most at risk were "carpets, felts and rafters used as partitions." The Buddha Room, which houses up to 38 thangkas, had the highest concentration of pests, specifically carpet beetles. The preservation of thangkas is particularly difficult, since not only insect damage but also environmental conditions, like changes in winds and temperatures, exposure to light, effects of pollution and dust, paint loss and natural ageing, can quickly cause the artworks to tear, wrinkle, or become brittle. The hall's glazed tiling, which was also a common feature in ancient Chinese architecture, has also experienced degradation and poor conservation due to hundreds of years of exposure to constant changes in environmental conditions, particularly rain.

Since September 2018, the Hall of Mental Cultivation has been closed due to such restoration. It was expected that the hall would reopen in 2020, but the opening was delayed until December 2025, when the hall finally reopened for public visits after decades of renovation. Over 4,300 spots across the architecture were fixed in the past decade. Experts also restored 500 paintings and settings, 120 groups of architectural decorations, and 88 plaques and hanging couplets.

== Digital exhibition ==
In October 2017, the Palace Museum launched the digital experience exhibition Discovering the Hall of Mental Cultivation. This exhibition is displayed within the Duanmen Tower, inside the digital display hall called the Duanmen Digital Museum, which was built in 2015. Discovering the Hall of Mental Cultivation is the first digital exhibition in China that integrates ancient architecture, traditional culture, and technology.

Discovering the Hall of Mental Cultivation won the Golden Award at the 2018 Festival of Audio-visual Multimedia, an event sponsored by the Committee of International Council of Museums, and Audio-visual International Multimedia.
