= Xie Daoyun =

4th-century Eastern Jin Dynasty poet

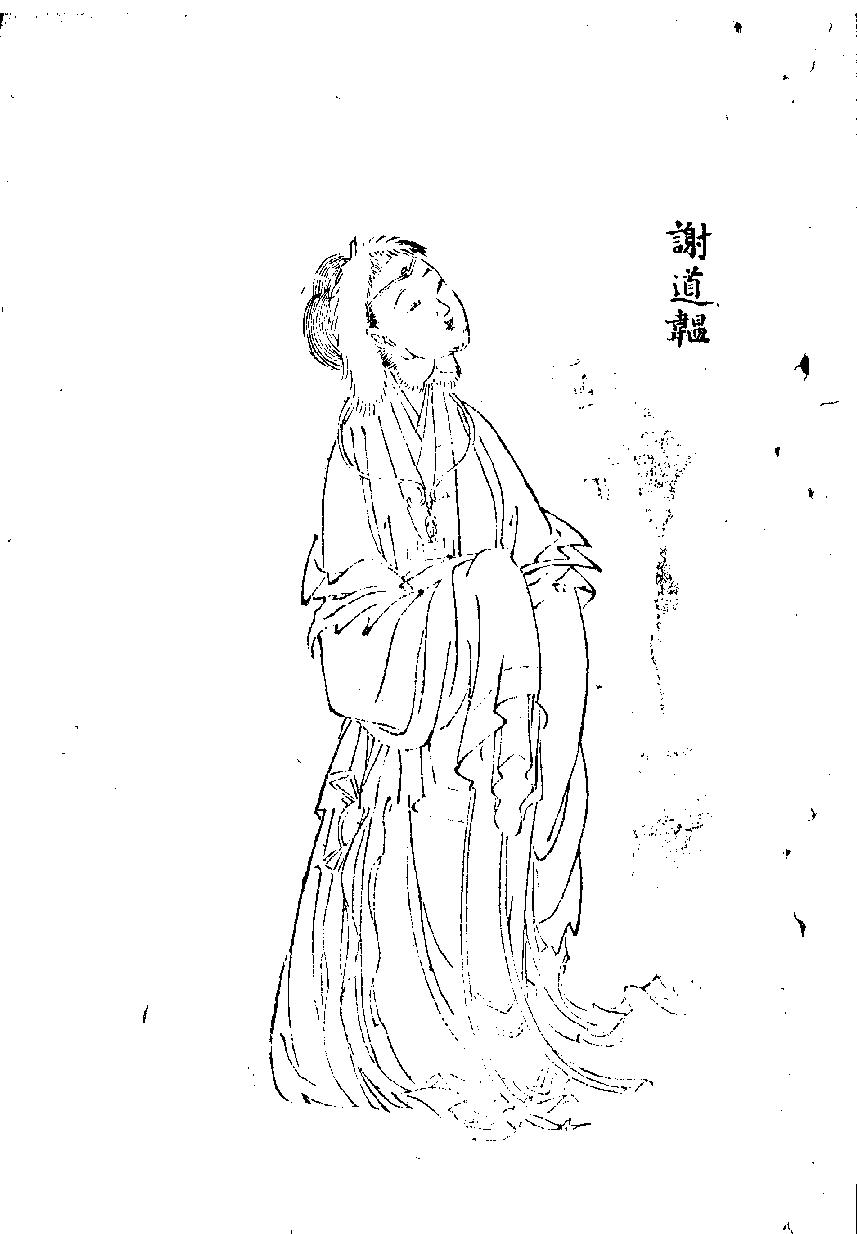
- 1772 drawing of Xie Daoyun.
- Spouse: Wang Yinzhi (王凝之)
- Parent: Xie Yi (謝奕)
- Relatives: Wang Xizhi (father-in-law); Xie Xuan (brother); Xie An (uncle)

Xie Daoyun (Simplified Chinese: 谢道韫; Traditional Chinese: 謝道韞; Pinyin: Xiè Dàoyùn) courtesy name Lingjiang (Chinese: 令姜; pinyin: Lìngjiāng), was a renowned poet of the Eastern Jin dynasty (266–420) CE. She was a native of Yangxia County, Chen Commandery (present-day Taikang County, Henan Province). Though she originally had a poetry collection spanning several volumes, most of her works have been lost over time, with only a few surviving pieces, such as Climbing the Mountain (Chinese: 登山; pinyin: Dēngshān) and Imitating Ji Kang’s Ode to the Pine (拟拟嵇中散咏松诗).

Xie Daoyun was the niece of Prime Minister Xie An, the daughter of General Xie Yi, the elder sister of General Xie Xuan, and the wife of calligrapher Wang Ningzhi. She is best known for the anecdote about her exceptional literary talent, commonly referred to as the "Talent for Chanting about Snow" (咏絮之才).

Xie Daoyun exemplifies the Wei-Jin Daoist practice of qingtan, the premier form of philosophical discourse of this period.

== Life ==
=== A Precocious Mind ===
Xie Daoyun was born into the illustrious Xie clan of Chen Commandery during the Eastern Jin dynasty. Her father was Xie Yi and her mother was Ruan Rong, both being from aristocratic houses, as Ruan Rong hailed from the equally prestigious Ruan clan of Chenliu. Surrounded by scholars and statesmen, Xie Daoyun was immersed in literature and philosophy from an early age.

Her intellect soon became evident. One day, her uncle, Xie An, sought to test the young members of the family. "Which verse from the Book of Songs is the finest?" he asked. While others hesitated, Xie Daoyun confidently responded, "Ji Fu composes an ode, as pure as the gentle breeze. Zhong Shanfu cherishes these words, finding solace in his heart." (吉甫作颂，穆如清风。仲山甫永怀，以慰其心)

Impressed, Xie An continued, pointing toward the snow-covered landscape outside. "Describe what you see," he prompted. Her cousin, Xie Lang, answered first: "Like salt scattered in the air." (撒盐空中差可拟) After a moment of thought, Xie Daoyun softly replied, "Not as fitting as willow catkins rising with the wind." (未若柳絮因风起) From that day, her brilliance was acknowledged far beyond her household. Later generations would remember her name in children's primers, alongside other women of exceptional talent: “Cai Wenji could distinguish the zither; Xie Daoyun could weave words into verse.”

=== A Marriage of Contrasts ===
Despite her intellect, Xie Daoyun's fate was not hers to choose. She was married into the powerful Wang family, becoming the wife of Wang Ningzhi, Wang Xizhi's son, a man better known for his calligraphy than his wisdom. Like many sons of the aristocracy, he indulged in metaphysical debates while shirking the responsibilities of governance. He lacked his wife's sharp mind, and she did not hesitate to chastise him for his idleness.

One evening, Wang Ningzhi's younger brother, Wang Xianzhi, engaged in a heated debate with a visiting scholar. His arguments floundered, his reasoning crumbling under the weight of his opponent's logic. Xie Daoyun, listening from the inner chambers, grew restless. Bound by Confucianist custom, she could not appear before male guests. Yet to remain silent was unbearable.

She devised a solution. A white curtain was hung before the hall's entrance. Concealed behind it, she reinforced her brother-in-law's faltering position. The guests, taken aback, soon found themselves struggling to counter her words. One by one, they conceded defeat. Though unseen, she had won the debate.

=== Steel Beneath Silk ===
Outside the Wang household, the empire was experiencing significant instability. Aristocratic families, accustomed to a relatively comfortable lifestyle, had lost much of their wealth. Natural disasters struck which led to famines, and as suffering deepened, rebellion against the state increased.

When the insurgent leader Sun En led his forces to besiege Kuaiji, where Wang Ningzhi served as governor, panic swept the city. But Wang Ningzhi turned not to fortifications or strategy, but to rituals. He burned incense, muttered incantations, and prayed for celestial intervention.

Due to her impotent husband, Xie Daoyun gathered the household guards, trained them for battle, and braced herself for the inevitable siege. When Sun En's forces breached the city, the Wang family was slaughtered. Yet Xie Daoyun, sword in hand, did not yield. She cut down several enemies before she was finally captured.

As she shielded a young nephew from the chaos, her voice rang out amidst the bloodstained ruins: "This matter concerns only my family. Spare the innocent." Sun En, a man known for his ruthless campaigns, paused. He chose to let her live.

=== An Unfinished Chapter ===
In the aftermath of war, Xie Daoyun remained in Kuaiji. The grand estates had fallen, the old world crumbled, but she endured.

One day, the new governor, Liu Liu, sought her out. He had long admired her reputation and wished to meet the woman whose name carried such weight. Xie Daoyun, ever composed, received him in her modest residence.

Liu Liu, upon speaking with her, was captivated—not by beauty, nor by wealth, but by the clarity of her thought, the quiet strength of her spirit. "Only after losing my kin," she later reflected, "did I finally meet such a man, whose questions opened my mind like a great vault."

History books do not tell us how Xie Daoyun spent the rest of her days. The poetry she once composed, the thoughts she wished to leave behind, have mostly been lost to time.

== Poetry ==
Xie Daoyun excelled in poetry and prose. According to The Collected Works of Women (妇人集), she possessed remarkable literary talent, with her poetry, rhapsodies, elegies, and discourses widely circulated in her time. The Bibliographical Treatise of the Book of Sui records that she had a poetry collection spanning two volumes, though it has since been lost. Today, only two of her works, Climbing the Mountain (登山) and Imitating Ji Kang’s Ode to the Pine (拟拟嵇中散咏松诗), remain.

Due to the scarcity of surviving pieces, it is difficult to comprehensively assess her literary style. However, through the remnants of her poetry and the trajectory of her life, later generations can still catch a glimpse of her inner world.

拟嵇中散咏松

遥望山上松，隆冬不能凋。

愿想游不憩，瞻彼万仞条。

腾跃未能升，顿足俟王乔。

时哉不我与，大运所飘遥。

Imitating Ji Kang’s Ode to the Pine

I gaze upon the mountain's pine,

Still green in winter's cold design.

I wish to wander beneath its shade,

And gaze at branches high reach.

Though I strive, I cannot fly,

I wish deity could lift me high.

The time is not my fate to guide,

As fortune drifts with fickle tide.

This poem differs from the generally delicate and refined style of women's poetry at the time, instead exhibiting a bold and vigorous character, reminiscent of the brushwork of male poets. It not only reflects Xie Daoyun's resilience and exceptional talent but also conveys her lament over the unpredictability of fate, shaped by the constraints of her era and the lack of agency in her own life.

In addition to poetry, she is also very accomplished in music. A Ming Dynasty musical composition is all about the gatherings of Xie Daoyun and Xie An.

== Bibliography ==
- Book of Jin: Biographies of Women
- A New Account of the Tales of the World: Famous Women
- Lily Xiao Hong Lee; A. D. Stefanowska (2007). Biographical dictionary of Chinese women: antiquity through Sui, 1600 B.C.E.-618 C.E. M.E. Sharpe, Inc.
- Xiong, Victor Cunrui (2017). Historical Dictionary of Medieval China (2nd ed.). Lanham, Maryland; New York City; London: Rowman & Littlefield.
