= Xie Xuan =

Jin Dynasty general (343–388)

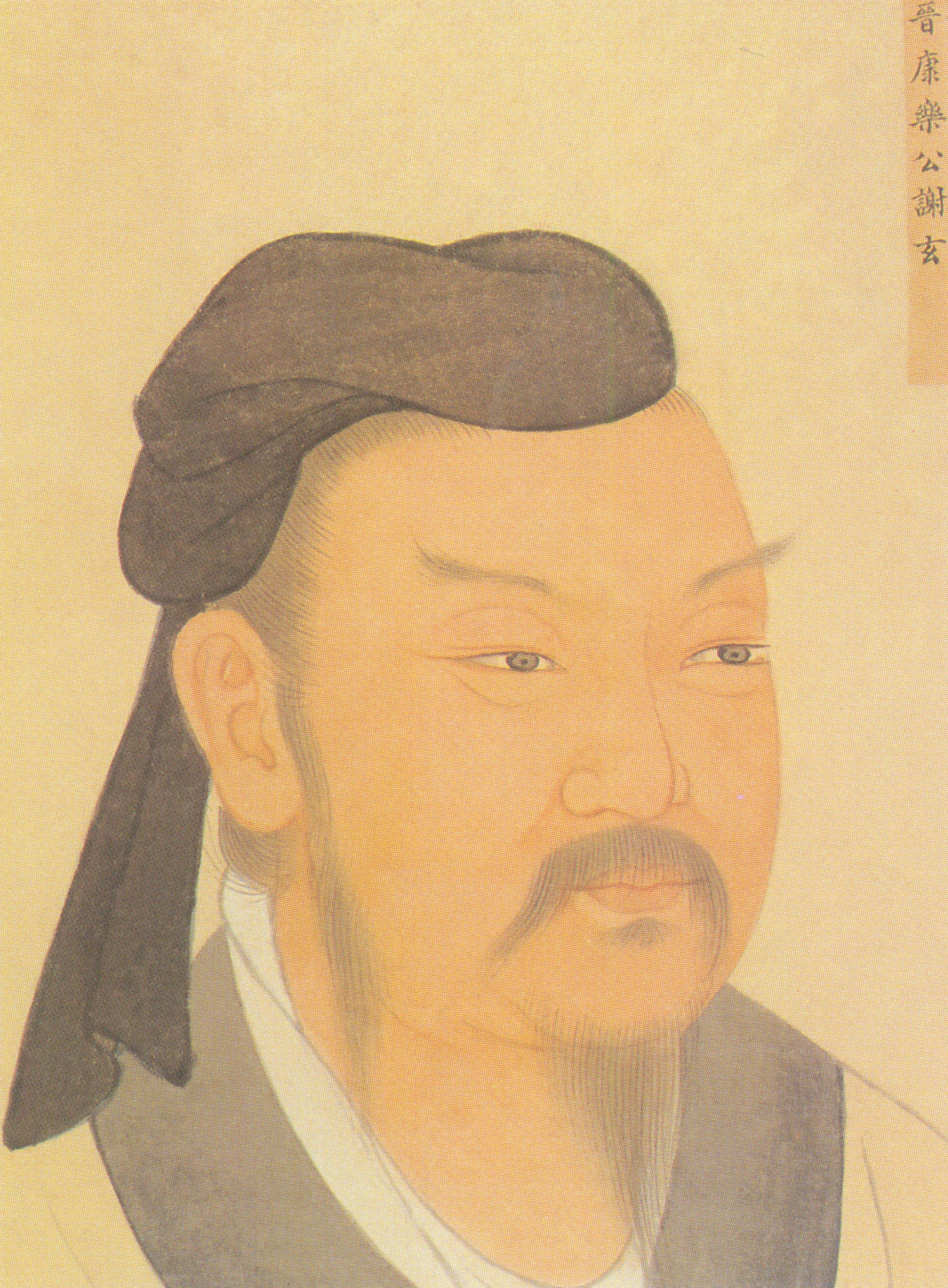
Portrait of Xie Xuan

Xie Xuan (謝玄) (343 – 8 February 388), courtesy name Youdu (幼度), formally Duke Xianwu of Kangle (康樂獻武公), was an Eastern Jin general who is best known for repelling the Former Qin army at the Battle of Fei River, preventing the Former Qin emperor Fu Jiān from destroying Jin and uniting China.

== Early career ==
Xie Xuan was a scion of the influential Xie clan of Chen. His father Xie Yi (謝奕), was the elder brother of the Jin prime minister Xie An. (Note: One of Xie Yi's and Xie An's cousins was Xie Shang.) Xie Xuan's sister Xie Daoyun (謝道韞) was known for her literary talent and quick wit. Early in his career, both Xie Xuan and his uncle Xie An served on staff of the paramount general Huan Wen. Huan Wen greatly prized Xie Xuan's ability, and once commented, with regard to him and his colleague Wang Xun (王珣), both of whom served as his secretaries:

By age 40, Mr. Xie will possess a great general's banner and staff, and Mr. Wang will be a prime minister even while his hair is black. Both are uncommon talents.

After Huan Wen's death in 373, Xie Xuan initially served on the staff of Huan Wen's brother Huan Huo. In 377, when the imperial government was looking for a general capable of defending the northeastern border (modern Jiangsu) against Former Qin, Xie An, against the usual custom of not recommending one's own clan members, recommended him. The official Xi Chao, who ordinarily feuded with Xie An on nearly all matters, immediately remarked, "Xie An, in his good judgment, made an uncommonly good move against public sentiment, and Xie Xuan would surely not fail his expectations." Xi made these remarks based on the time when he also served on Huan Wen's staff and saw Xie Xuan's abilities.

Xie Xuan recruited elite soldiers, and among the ones that joined him was Liu Laozhi (劉牢之), who in later campaigns served as his assistant and forward commander. Eventually, Xie put together an army that was the most elite of the Jin forces, known as the Beifu Forces (北府兵). His army first distinguished itself in 378, when Former Qin forces made simultaneous attacks on the important Jin cities Xiangyang (襄陽, in modern Xiangfan, Hubei), Weixing (魏興; southeast of present-day Suqian, Jiangsu), and Pengcheng (彭城, in modern Xuzhou, Jiangsu). Xiangyang and Weixing fell to Former Qin, as did Pengcheng, but Xie, charged with relieving Pengcheng, made a fierce counterattack in 379, defeating the Former Qin generals Ju Nan (俱難) and Peng Chao (彭超) and recapturing Pengcheng. This was the first major victory that Jin had over Former Qin in decades, and it was a major morale booster.

== The Battle of Fei River ==
In 383, as Former Qin launched a major assault with intent to destroy Jin once and for all, Xie Xuan and his Beifu Force was sent to the frontline, reporting to the command of his uncle Xie Shi (謝石). Xie Shi, initially intimidated by the much larger Former Qin force, considered merely trying to block Former Qin progress without major engagement, but after he was advised otherwise by the Former Qin ambassador Zhu Xu—a Jin general who was captured by Former Qin in 379 but who secretly remained loyal to Jin—and chose to engage Former Qin forward troops that arrived first. Xie Xuan, charged with engaging Former Qin forces, along with Liu Laozhi, dealt them minor defeats, reducing their morale. When Former Qin troops gradually arrived, the Former Qin and Jin forces became stalemated across the Fei River. (Note: The river no longer exists, but probably flowed through Lu'an, Anhui, near the Huai River.)

Xie Xuan sent a message to the Former Qin commanding general Fu Rong (Note: Fu Jiān's brother) with a proposal—to have Fu Rong order his troops to retreat slightly to allow the Jin forces across, so the armies could engage. Fu Rong, after discussing with Fu Jiān, agreed, and ordered a retreat. However, once the Former Qin troops went into retreat, it panicked, and as Fu Rong tried to calm his troops down, his horse suddenly fell, and he was killed by Jin soldiers. Once that happened, Xie Xuan and other generals, Xie Yan (謝琰) and Huan Yi fiercely attacked Former Qin troops, which then completely collapsed. Former Qin would face major rebellions starting in 384 that eventually led to its disintegration and would not again pose a threat to Jin.

== After the Battle of Fei River ==
Due to his achievements at the Battle of Fei River, Xie Xuan was created the Duke of Kangle. When the major general Huan Chong died in 384, initially Xie Xuan was to succeed him, but Xie An thought the Huan clan might be unhappy about yielding Huan Chong's command to others, so divided Huan Chong's domain into three and distributed them to members of the Huan clan. Later that year, however, Xie Xuan was put in charge of a force targeting the recovery of central China, along with Huan Shiqian. He quickly recovered most of the territory south of the Yellow River on Jin's behalf, and, in an odd case of enemies quickly turning allies, briefly relieved Fu Jiān's son Fu Pi, who was defending Yecheng against rebels led by Murong Chui, who had just founded Later Yan.

Xie apparently considered further operations to try to seize territory north of the Yellow River, but as Murong Chui quickly entrenched himself north of the Yellow River, it became clear it would be difficult to do so. In 386, after the generals Zhai Liao and Zhang Yuan (張願) rebelled, in light of popular opinion that believed that the troops were being worn out, Xie abandoned the plans entirely, and indeed moved his headquarters from Pengcheng south to Huaiyin (淮陰, in modern Huai'an, Jiangsu), although Jin continued to hold most of the territory south of the Yellow River.

After that point, it appeared that Xie suffered a series of illnesses that made it impossible for him to conduct any further campaigns and which also made him to repeatedly try to resign his command. Eventually, he was made the governor of Kuaiji Commandery along the southern shore of Hangzhou Bay. The post was important, but almost entirely civilian. He died in 388 while still serving as the governor of Kuaiji.
