= Wu Yi =

Wu Yi (Wade–Giles: Wu I) may refer to:

- Wu Yi of Shang (武乙), 12th-century BC king of the Shang dynasty
- Wu Yi (Three Kingdoms) (吳懿), 3rd-century Shu Han general
- Wu Yi (politician) (吴仪; born 1938), PRC Vice-Premier
- Wu Yi (singer) (武艺; born 1990), Hong Kong-Chinese singer
- Wu Yi (scholar) (武億; 1745–1799), Qing dynasty scholar

== See also ==
- Wuyi (disambiguation)
