= Xie clan of Chen Commandery =

Xie 謝
- Clan
- Origin: Chen Commandery
- Founded: Three Kingdoms period
- Founder: Xie Zuan
- Titles: Various
- Dissolution: late Northern and Southern Dynasties period

The Xie clan of Chen Commandery (陳郡謝氏) was a prominent clan, originating in Chen Commandery (modern-day Zhoukou, Henan). First rising to prominence in the Eastern Jin period, they retained their importance throughout the Southern dynasties in the Northern and Southern Dynasties period, along with such clans as the Wang clan of Langya, with which they were often associated as "Wang-Xie" (王謝).

== Prominent Members ==
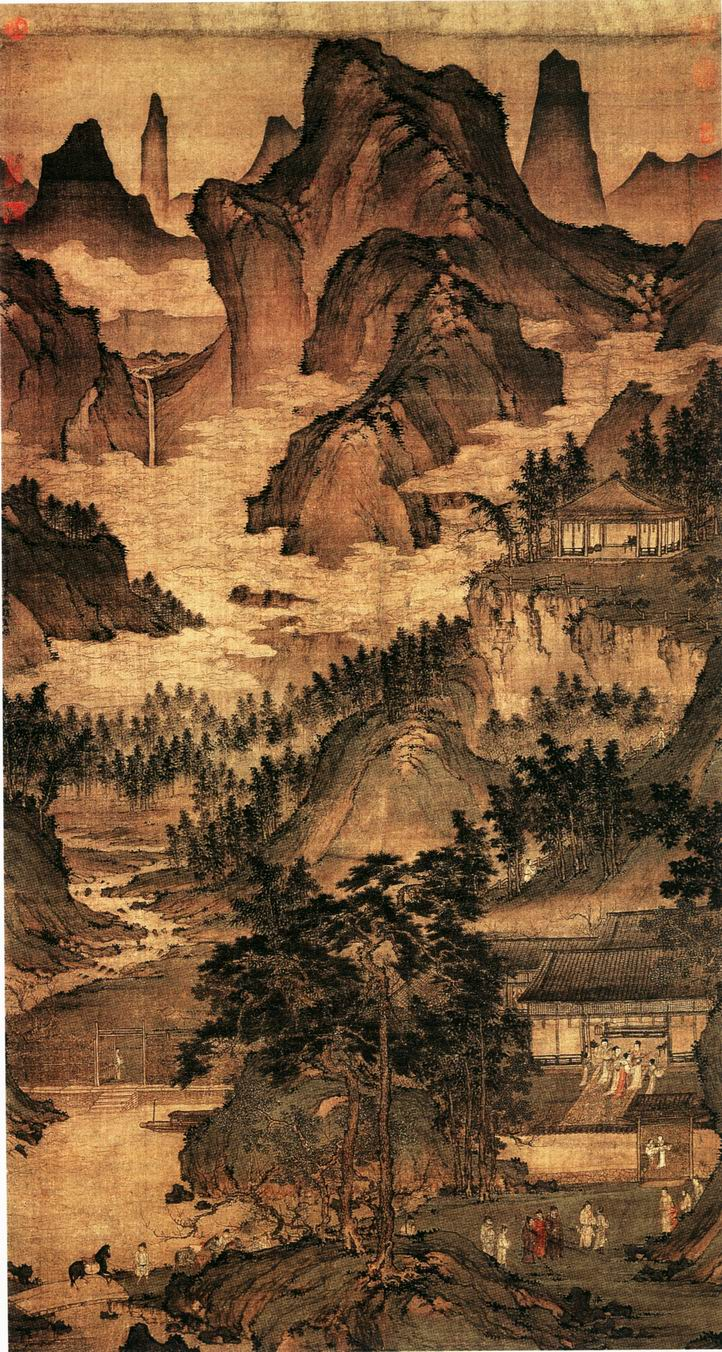
Yuan dynasty painting depicting Xie An's seclusion in Dongshan.

=== Three Kingdoms period ===
- Xie Zuan (謝纘, 214–282), Cao Wei and Western Jin general and politician; founded the clan in Yangxia County, Chen commandery

=== Jin dynasty ===
- Xie An (320–385), Eastern Jin statesman, overall commander at the Battle of the Fei River
- Xie Wan (320–361), Jin general
- Xie Shang (327–389), Jin general
- Xie Xuan (343–388), Jin general
- Xie Daoyun (340 – after 399), poet and calligrapher, daughter-in-law of Wang Xizhi

=== Northern and Southern dynasties ===
- Xie Lingyun (385–433), poet and pioneer of 'mountain-and-water poetry'
- Xie Hui, (390–426) Liu Song general
- Xie Tiao (464–499), poet; pioneer of Yongming poetry
