= Wang Xun (calligrapher) =

Chinese Eastern Jin official and calligrapher (349–400)

Wang Xun (Chinese name: 王珣; 349 – 24 June 400), courtesy name Yuanlin (元琳), posthumously known as Marquis Xian of Dongting (东亭献侯), was a Chinese calligrapher who lived during the Eastern Jin dynasty. A member of the Wang clan of Langya, Wang Xun's father Wang Qia was a second cousin of the "Sage of Calligraphy" Wang Xizhi (王羲之); Wang Xun was thus a third cousin of Wang Xianzhi (王献之).

His most famous work is a letter written to his friend Boyuan (伯远), called "A letter to Boyuan" (伯远帖; Boyuan tie), which is one of the "Three Rarities of Calligraphy" (三希帖).

== Biography ==
Wang Xun was born in Luangmu, the grandson of the prime minister Wang Dao, and the son of Wang Qia, the most famous of Wang Dao's sons. At first, he was the puisne of Huan Wen, and Xie Xuan, his colleague, was respected by Huan Wen. Wang Xun was later appointed as the Chief Clerk of the army. At the time, Huan Wen was carrying out the northern expedition, and military affairs are handed over to Wang Xun; tens of thousands of people, both military and civilian, knew him. In November or December 369, Yuan Zhen, the Inspector of Yuzhou, rebelled as he was not willing to be blamed by Huan Wen after Huan forced him to bear the responsibility for the failure of Huan's third Northern Expedition; the Eastern Jin court also failed to deal with Yuan's complaint about Huan. Yuan then surrendered to Former Yan. Wang Xun then participated in the expedition to pacify the rebellion. As such, Wang Xun was appointed the Marquis of Dongting (东亭侯). Later, Wang Xun was appointed to be the military counselor of the grand secretary of state; he also became a Companion of the Prince of Langya. After Huan Wen's death in August 373, Wang Xun was transferred to be the chief historian of the general Huan Chong, who was then General of the Middle Army (中军将军) and the minister of the emperor's valet.

At the time that Wang Xun married Xie Wan's daughter, his brother Wang Min also married Xie An's daughter. Despite the marriage ties, there was mutual suspicion. After Xie An allowed Wang Xun and Wang Min to divorce their wives, the Wang and Xie clans became enemies. At the time, Xie An was influential in the Eastern Jin court; under his machinations, Wang Xun was appointed as governor of Yuzhang. Wang Xun did not want to go and would not assume office. He was later appointed as Sanqi Changshi; again, Wang Xun did not accept the appointment, and was then transferred to the post of secretary supervisor.

After his death in June 400, he was given the posthumous name "Xianmu" (献穆).

== Calligraphy ==
=== Bo Yuan Post ===
Wang Xun is a calligrapher, whose works of calligraphy include "Bo Yuan Post". Bo Yuan Post" is a letter to ask friends and relatives about their health. Xun three generations to be able to book called, family model world learning. Xun's "grass saint" (草圣) style has also passed on." This post by the Northern Song dynasty government collection, Dong Qichang from the Ming dynasty had collection, and said "Wang Xun book dashing ancient tanya, east jin style, just like in the eye", also said "both fortunate to see Wang Xun, but also fortunate that Xun book is inexhaustible annihilation, get to see me also. Changan met ink, this is a special thing". The Qianlong Emperor will "bor yuantai" listed as one of the "three Xi". Gu Fu said in the "life of the spectacular" in the "Bo Yuan post": "paper firm and clean and pen flying, free of Wang's habit." An Qi's Ink Edge Convergence View commented, "There is a natural composure." Yang Shoujing of the Qing Dynasty, "Record of the Flat Post": "This is a real line, and it is already a famous one. Observe its pen, force to change the right army father and son, but not a trick in the right, the so-called indulge in self-complacency, the ancient and elegant have more than one also." This post is highly evaluated.

The Xuanhe Shu Pu (宣和书谱; Records of the Xuanhe Script) also included his cursive "March Post", which is not extant today.

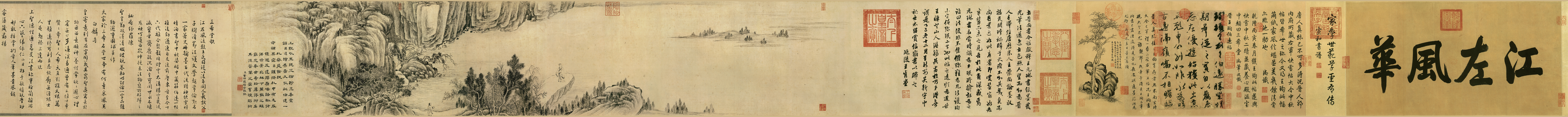
Wang Xun "A letter to Boyuan",《伯远帖》, now in Forbidden City
