= Wuyi Square =

Wuyi Square (Chinese: 五一广场; lit. 'May First Square') may refer to:

- Wuyi Square (Changsha)
  - Wuyi Square Station, Changsha Metro
- Wuyi Square (Fuzhou)
- Wuyi Square (Taiyuan)
