= Battle of Fei River =

383 battle between Eastern Jin and Former Qin

Coordinates: 31°44′10″N 116°31′12″E

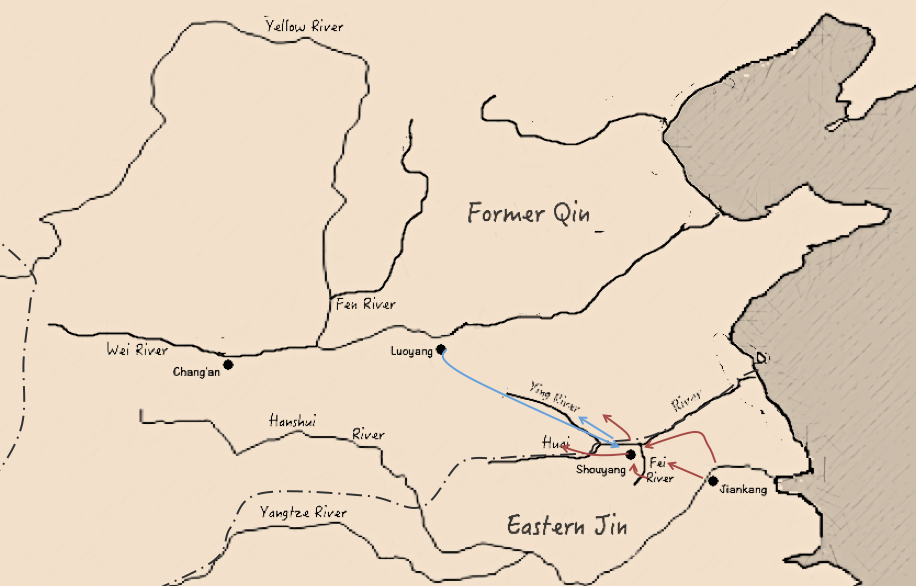
- The situation during Battle of Fei River
Date	30 November 383
Location	Fei River, China
Result	Decisive Jin victory
Territorial changes	Jin recaptures territories south of the Yellow River.

Belligerents
Former Qin dynasty	Eastern Jin dynasty

Commanders and leaders
Fu Jian (Emperor Xuanzhao of Former Qin); Fu Rong †; Yao Chang; Murong Wei; Murong De; Murong Bao	Xie An; Xie Xuan; Xie Shi (謝石); Xie Yan (謝琰); Huan Chong; Huan Yi

Strength
Book of Jin records 870,000 (Note: A 2012 study of the historicity of the battle and the accuracy of descriptions carried in historical texts concluded with strong possibility that the scale of the engagement was "dramatically exaggerated", but that it did indeed occur. This study was spurred by a 1968 paper which called into question the historicity of the entire episode apart from the smaller initial sortie led by Liu Laozhi, based on the historical circumstances under which the records of the event were created and transmitted. The myth theory was never widely accepted, having been largely refuted in 1996 by scrutiny of the subsequent rewards of the successful generals named, and the fact that records of the battle were carried by texts composed and transmitted by the defeated side, although the compilers of the Book of Jin were deemed "careless".)	80,000 elite Beifu troops

Casualties and losses
Book of Jin records 700,000+	5000

The Battle of Fei River, also known as the Battle of Feishui (simplified Chinese: 淝水之战; traditional Chinese: 淝水之戰; pinyin: Féishǔi zhī zhàn), took place in the autumn of 383 AD in China, where forces of the Di-led Former Qin dynasty were decisively defeated by the outnumbered army of the Eastern Jin dynasty. The location of the battle, the Fei River, no longer exists but is believed to have flowed through modern Lu'an, Anhui, near the Huai River. The battle is considered to be one of the most significant and pivotal battles in Chinese history, as it ensured the survival of the Eastern Jin and Han-ruled regimes in South China, whereas the Former Qin fell into a massive civil war, resulting in its eventual collapse.

This battle is famous not only because of its significance in history but also because it demonstrated the importance of troop training, morale, loyalty and organized battle command. The battle was also significant in that it ensured South China would remain independent until 589 AD, when North China was again under a Han Chinese regime, the Sui dynasty.

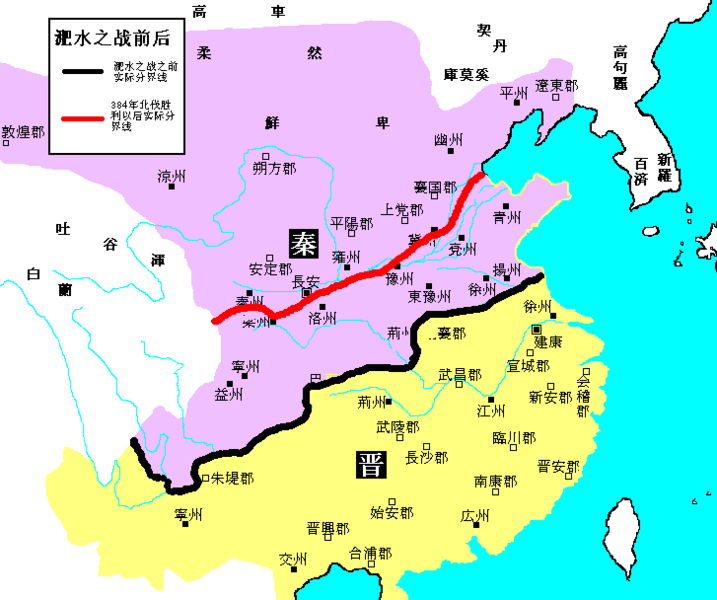
Former Qin is in purple, while the Eastern Jin is in yellow. The red line marks the new border between Former Qin and Eastern Jin after the latter's victory at Fei River, while the border marked on the map represents the pre-battle border, the furthest line reached by Former Qin forces before their catastrophic defeat.

== Background ==
The state of Former Qin, led by ethnic Di (氐) tribesmen, rose rapidly from a string of successes in the 350s. Fu Jiān, the nephew of the founder Fu Jiàn, was a vigorous leader of tremendous drive and ambition. In 370 he conquered the state of Former Yan and in 373 seized modern Sichuan and Chongqing from Jin. In 379, the strategically important city of Xiangyang, gateway to the Middle Yangtze, fell to Qin. By 381, he had conquered all of north China and was preparing for an invasion of the south.

In May 383, a Jin army of 100,000 commanded by Huan Chong attempted to recover Xiangyang but was driven off by a Qin relief column of 50,000 men. In response, Fu Jiān ordered a general mobilization against Jin: 6 of every 10 able-bodied men were conscripted, and 30,000 elite guards (羽林郎) were gathered. In August 383, Fu Jiān sent his brother, Fu Rong, the Duke of Yangping (who had opposed the campaign), with an army of 300,000 as the advance force. Later that month, Fu Jiān marched with his army of 270,000 cavalry and 600,000 infantry from Chang'an. In September, Fu Jiān reached Xiangcheng. Separate columns were to push downstream from Sichuan, but the main offensive would occur against the city of Shouchun on the Huai River. Emperor Xiaowu of Jin hurriedly made preparations for defense. He gave Huan Chong responsibility for the defense of the Middle Yangtze. The pressing defense of the Huai River was given to Xie Shi (謝石) and Xie Xuan and the elite 80,000-strong Beifu Army (北府兵). Prime Minister Xie An oversaw overall strategy.

Huan Chong was deeply worried and sent three thousand elite soldiers into the city to support the capital, but was resolutely stopped by Xie An, saying: "The way the imperial court will deal with it has been decided, there is no shortage of soldiers and weapons, please stay in the west, just in case." Huan Chong sighed at his subordinates and said, "Xie An has the strength to live in the imperial court, but he is not familiar with the means of leading troops to fight. Now that the great enemy is coming, they are still playing to their heart's content, they will talk big, and they can only send young people (Xie Xuan) who have never fought to resist, coupled with the lack of numbers and weak troops, the end of the country has long been known, and we are about to be ruled by barbarians!" Later, the Jin army on the eastern front defeated the Qin army, and Huan Chong was ashamed to learn the news, and died of an attack of illness at the age of 57.

=== Former Qin Army ===
Fu Jiān's force was composed of many smaller armies levied from the conquered northern territories, along with cavalry drawn from the nomadic peoples of the north (the Xianbei and Xiongnu). Most men had little or no loyalty to the Former Qin, and many were forced to join or joined only because of military rations and pay. Many battalions had problems following orders as instructed by their commanding officers. Fu was warned of the poor training of his heterogeneous army, but instead chose to rely on the vast number of men that made up the army, saying, "My army is so huge that if all the men throw their whips into the Yangtze, its flow will be stopped" (投鞭断流).

=== Jin Army ===
Xie Xuan's Beifu army was drawn from the militarized settlements of powerful local families, with officers bringing along their own hereditary troops. This army underwent significant training and could be considered a professional military unit.

== Battle ==
In October 383, the Former Qin forces under Fu Rong captured the important Jin city of Shouyang (壽陽, in modern Lu'an, Anhui). Fu Jiān, seeing the possibility of achieving a quick victory, left his main force at Xiangcheng and led 8,000 light cavalry to rendezvous with Fu Rong. Fu Jiān sent captured Jin official Zhu Xu as a messenger to try to persuade Xie Shi to surrender. Instead, Zhu tipped off Xie Shi to the fact that the entire Former Qin force had not yet arrived and that he should try to defeat the advanced Former Qin forces to cripple the Former Qin's campaign. At Zhu's suggestion, Xie Xuan and Liu Laozhi led 5,000 elite troops to engage the advanced Former Qin force, scoring a devastating victory, killing 15,000 men. Afterwards, Jin troops were lined up in a wide formation to give the illusion that the Jin forces could match Former Qin's manpower. Because of the early minor defeats and the Jin formation, Fu Jiān overestimated the amount of Jin forces.

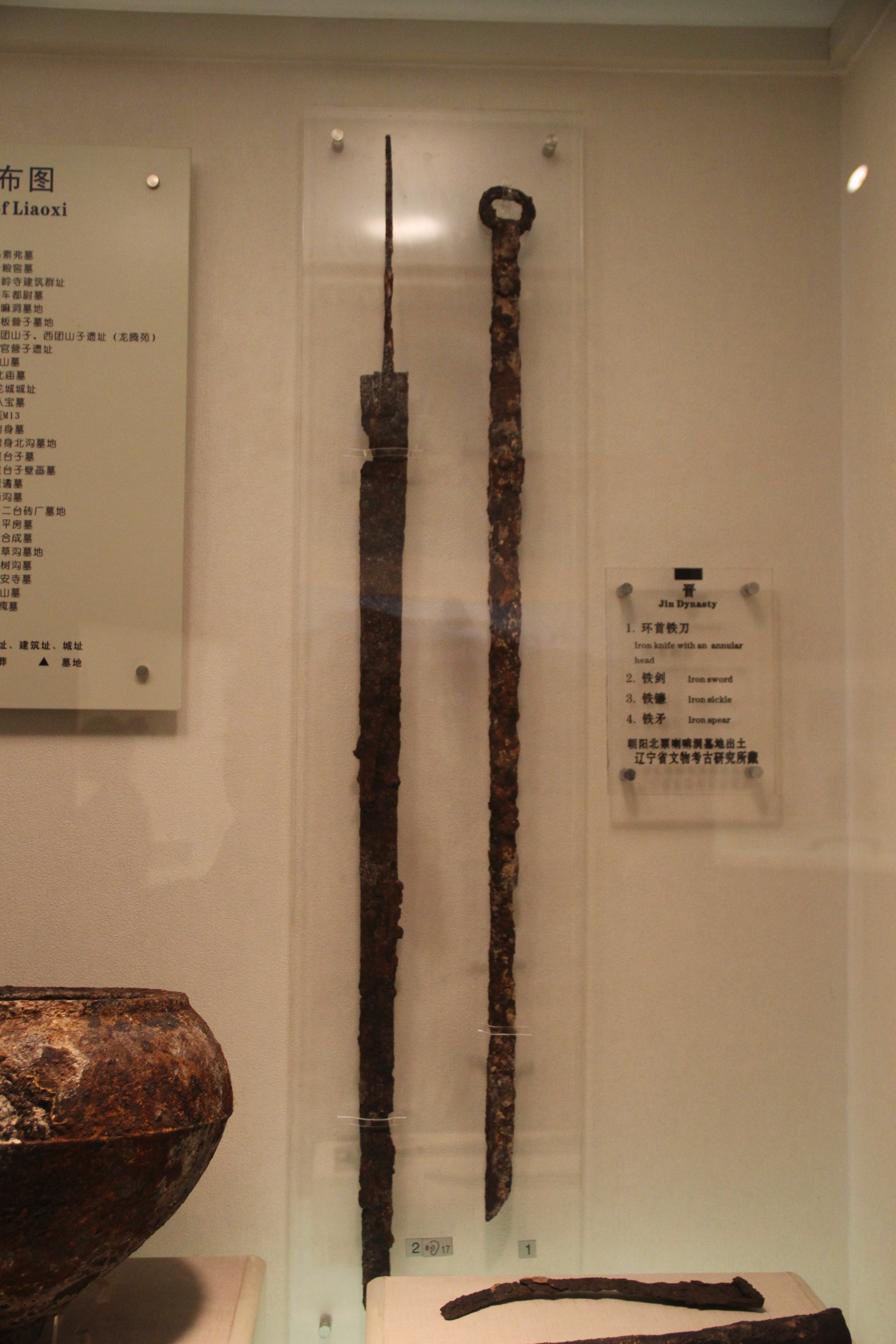
Jin iron swords

In November 383, the Former Qin troops set up camp west of the Fei River. The Jin forces stopped east of the Fei and could not advance. Xie Xuan sent a messenger to Fu Rong, suggesting that the Former Qin forces retreat slightly west to allow Jin troops to cross the Fei River so that the two armies could engage. Most Former Qin generals opposed that plan, since maneuvering such a large army in that manner was too complicated for the benefits that might be obtained, especially with so many poorly trained troops. Fu Jiān overruled them, however, planning to attack the Jin army as it was crossing the river to seize a tactical advantage, as the Jin would be split in two. Fu Rong agreed and ordered a retreat.

The Jin's tactics of ambush and bribery now paid off. Many soldiers in the Former Qin army began to wonder why a sudden retreat order was given. Already retreating and demoralized, the Former Qin army went into a panic when Zhu Xu raised a cry of "the Qin army has been defeated" and it was routed. Xie Xuan and generals Xie Yan and Huan Yi crossed the river and launched a major assault. The "Qin is Defeated" rumor spread and chaos followed. Fu Rong personally tried to halt the retreat and reorganize his troops, but his horse suddenly fell and he was killed by advancing Jin troops.

The Jin generals noticed the chaotic footprints and wheel marks and declared that the Former Qin army was not in an organized retreat but was indeed in total disarray. The Jin soldiers continued their pursuit, and the entire Former Qin force collapsed. A large amount of food and supplies were abandoned as Former Qin soldiers tried to escape with their lives. In the ensuing retreat and pursuit, an estimated 70-80% of the Former Qin troops died from combat, starvation and exposure to the elements.

== Aftermath ==
The Jin army defeated the overwhelming Former Qin forces with only minor casualties. The Jin had routed and killed most of the escaping soldiers of the Former Qin army, greatly weakening the pool of troops from which the Former Qin could draw. Fu Jiān's forces were not able to be reorganized, even after he eventually withdrew to Luoyang under the protection of Murong Chui, whose 30,000-man army was one of the few that did not collapse.

Meanwhile, agrarian rebellions arose after news of the defeat at Fei River. Murong Chui used this opportunity to ask Fu Jiān to let him try to lead an army to pressure the rebels in the eastern empire back into submission. Instead, Murong Chui himself rebelled in early 384, which started a chain reaction of many Xianbei and Qiang uprisings. The Former Qin capital Chang'an would fall in 385 to the Xianbei forces of Western Yan, and Fu Jiān himself would die later that year at the hands of his former general Yao Chang, the founder of Later Qin. While Former Qin would last until 394, it would never regain its power and glory. In addition, after the battle, Jin forces advanced to the Yellow River and recovered much of the Chinese heartland, forming a basis for Liu Yu's expeditions and the Southern and Northern dynasties period that would follow soon afterward.
