= Xie An =

Jin Dynasty statesman (320–385)

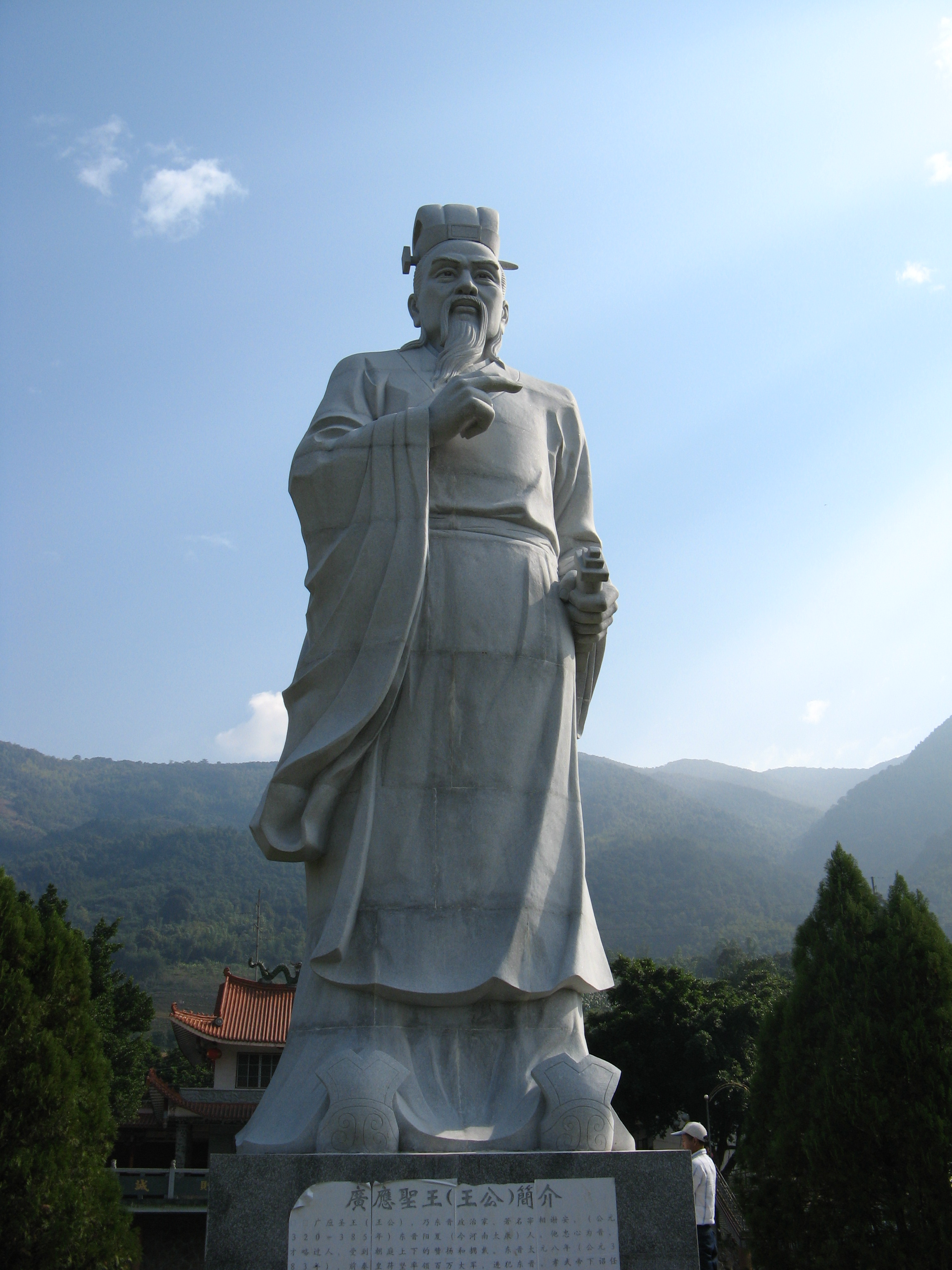
Statue of Xie An, Zhangzhou, Fujian

Xie An (謝安) (320 – 12 October 385), courtesy name Anshi (安石), formally Duke Wenjing of Luling (廬陵文靖公), also known as "Xie Dongshan" (谢东山 (Note: "Dongshan" literally means 'East Mountain'; Xie's return to politics was the origins of the chengyu "Dongshan zaiqi" (东山再起), used to describe someone making a comeback.)), was a Chinese politician of the Eastern Jin dynasty who, despite his lack of military ability and skill, led Jin through a major crisis—attacks by Former Qin. In part due to his actions, his clan—the Xie clan of Chen—became one of the two most honored during the subsequent Southern Dynasties, alongside Wang Dao's Wang clan of Langya, and in the minds of the people no less honored than imperial clans. Xie An is depicted in the Wu Shuang Pu (無雙譜, Table of Peerless Heroes) by Jin Guliang.

== Background and early career ==
Xie An's father Xie Pou (謝裒) was a minister in the Jin government. When Xie An was a child, he had already impressed the Jin officials Huan Yi (Huan Wen's father), (Note: Huan had compared a three-year-old Xie to Wang Cheng (grandson of Wang Chang) from the Wang clan of Taiyuan. Wang Cheng was sometimes known as "Wang Donghai" as he had a stint as an Inner Attendant in Donghai Commandery.) Wang Meng (Wang Muzhi's father), and Wang Dao with his talent. He later served as a low-level assistant to the chancellor, but he later quit from governmental service and effectively became a hermit, and he repeatedly rejected governmental commissions. However, by popular reputation, the people had great expectations of him.

He taught his children and the children of his siblings literature, philosophy and debate. His favourite niece was Xie Daoyun, who would become famous as a writer and debater. She would later defend him against criticism from Huan Xuan.

It was not, however, until his brother Xie Wan, a governor and a general, was defeated in battle in 359 and reduced to commoner status, that Xie An considered reentering governmental service. (Note: Earlier, their cousin Xie Shang had died in June 357. Xie Shang's sister was the mother of Chu Suanzi, Emperor Kang's empress and Emperor Mu's mother. She was also empress dowager from Emperor Mu's reign until her death in July 384.) He went to see the general Huan Wen, who had been impressed with him previously, and Huan took him in as an assistant. However, he did not share in Huan's plan to usurp the imperial title. When Emperor Jianwen died in 372, Huan recommended Xie to be one of the key officials in the imperial government. But, instead of controlling the imperial government on Huan's behalf, Xie soon joined forces with Wang Tanzhi to deny Huan the official title of regent for Emperor Jianwen's 10-year-old son Emperor Xiaowu. Instead, Wang and Xie invited Empress Dowager Chu, the wife of Emperor Xiaowu's cousin, Emperor Kang, to serve as regent. Huan therefore resented Xie and Wang.

In 373, when Huan visited the capital, Wang and Xie were sent to welcome him, and there were rumors that Huan was going to execute Xie and Wang and then usurp the throne. Wang was very fearful, while Xie calmly stated, "Our journey will determine whether the empire survives or not." As Huan arrived, he put on a great display of his army, and Wang was so anxious that his clothes were wet from his sweat, and the writing tablet he held in his hand was upside down. Xie, however, was very calm in seating himself, and then persuaded Huan to put away his display of army. After Huan died later that year, Xie came up with a plan to keep Huan's clan satisfied yet weakening them—he divided Huan's military command into three and gave them to Huan's brothers Huan Chong and Huan Huo and nephew Huan Shixiu (桓石秀; brother of Huan Shiqian). The fears of a Huan usurpation dissipated, particularly because Huan Chong was committed to the survival of the imperial government.

In the start of Emperor Xiaowu's reign, Xie shared power with Wang Tanzhi and Wang Biaozhi. However, Wang Tanzhi soon became a military commander and governor, and then died in 375. Xie An became effectively the sole prime minister.

== As prime minister ==
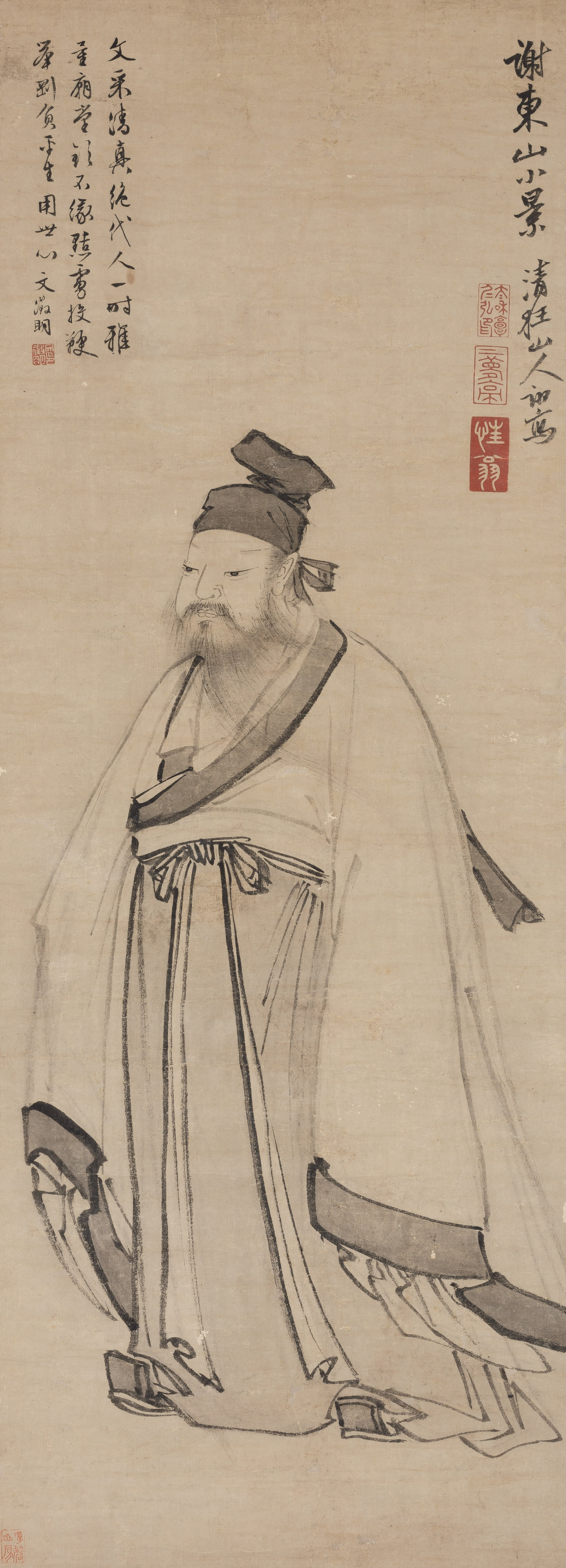
A 16th-century portrait of Xie An, by Guo Xu

=== Prior to the Battle of Fei River ===
As prime minister, Xie tried to show leniency to people, and that was manifested by a number of general pardons that the Jin imperial government declared. He also changed the tax system from being based on land ownership to a head tax in 376.

Meanwhile, Jin's rival Former Qin was expanding itself in the north, destroying Former Yan in 370, seizing Jin's Liang (梁州, modern southern Shaanxi) and Yi (益州, modern Sichuan and Chongqing) Provinces in 373, and destroying Dai and the nominal Jin vassal Former Liang in 376. In 378, Former Qin launched attacks on the key Jin cities of Xiangyang, Weixing (魏興; southeast of present-day Suqian, Jiangsu), and Pengcheng (彭城, in modern Xuzhou, Jiangsu). While Xie An's nephew, the general Xie Xuan, was able to repel the Former Qin attack on Pengcheng, Xiangyang and Weixing fell in 379, and Jin's position appeared even more desperate. However, it was said that Xie, through his calmness, calmed the hearts of the people. In 383, Huan Chong launched a counterattack to try to recapture Xiangyang, but after some inconclusive battles, Huan withdrew.

=== The Battle of Fei River ===
In fall 383, Former Qin's emperor Fu Jiān launched a major attack, hoping to destroy Jin and unite China. Xie sent his younger brother Xie Shi (謝石) to command the forces resisting Former Qin. As Xie Xuan, the advance general under Xie Shi's command, was ready to depart for the frontlines, he sought further instruction from Xie An, who only stated, "I will have additional instructions later." Xie Xuan did not dare to ask anything further. They then went to Xie An's vacation home, where they played Go—a game that Xie Xuan was typically far better than Xie An at, but Xie Xuan, anxious about the coming battle, lost to the far calmer Xie An. Meanwhile, Huan, believing that the capital Jiankang needed additional defenses, sent several thousand elite soldiers to help the capital defense; instead, Xie sent them back to Huan, stating that the capital was already well-guarded and that the troops would be better off defending the western provinces (under Huan's command).

The Former Qin forces quickly captured the important city of Shouyang. However, after the armies stalemated at the Fei River (which no longer exists, but probably flowed through Lu'an, near the Huai River), Former Qin forces, in an effort to try to draw Jin forces across the river, retreated—and then oddly enough panicked and collapsed. When news of the victory arrived at Xie An's headquarters, he was playing Xiangqi with a guest, but did not display particular emotion, but only stated, "The kids won a battle." However, his excitement became evident when, after the game, he was going back to his bedroom, and he forgot about the threshold to his bedroom and broke his wooden sandal without realizing it.

=== After the Battle of Fei River ===
After the battle, however, Xie's power began to wane. Part of it was that his son-in-law Wang Guobao, a son of Wang Tanzhi, whose behavior Xie disapproved of, began to attack him before both Emperor Xiaowu and his brother Sima Daozi the Prince of Kuaiji, leading to the emperor no longer trusting Xie An as much, although he remained prime minister.

In 384, Huan Chong died, and initially most officials favored having Xie Xuan replace Huan, but Xie An, not wanting his own clan to wield too much power and also apprehensive that the Huan clan may feel slighted, declined, and divided Huan Chong's domain between his nephews Huan Shimin (桓石民) and Huan Shiqian, and another member of the Huan clan, Huan Yi.

Later that year, Xie An requested permission to lead an army north to try to regain territory in light of Former Qin's collapse. However, while Xie Xuan recovered the territory south of the Yellow River, and other generals regained the Liang and Yi Provinces, Xie An himself did not appear to actually carry out a campaign, although he did leave the capital to avoid confrontation with Sima Daozi, who wanted to take over as prime minister. When he grew ill in fall 385, he required permission to return to the capital, and he died soon thereafter. Emperor Xiaowu posthumously created him the Duke of Luling (a greater dukedom than Jianchang, which he was previously the duke of) and buried him with the same honors that Huan Wen was given.

== Family ==
=== Elder Brothers ===
- Xie Yi (謝奕)
- Xie Ju (謝據), died early and his children were adopted by Xie An. (Note: Xie Ju's grandson Xie Yu, courtesy name Jingren, has a biography in vol.52 of Book of Song.)

=== Younger Brothers ===
- Xie Wan (謝萬)
- Xie Shi (謝石), military commander of Battle of Feishui
- Xie Tie (謝鐵)

=== Elder Cousin ===
- Xie Shang (謝尚)

=== Wife ===
- Lady Liu, younger sister of Liu Tan (劉惔), disallowed Xie An of having concubines

=== Son ===
- Xie Yan (謝琰)

=== Niece ===
- Xie Daoyun (謝道韞), debater, calligrapher and writer

=== Nephew ===
- Xie Xuan, Jin military commander at Battle of Feishui

== See also ==
Orchid Pavilion Gathering

== Work Referenced ==
- Lily Xiao Hong Lee; A. D. Stefanowska (2007). Biographical dictionary of Chinese women: antiquity through Sui, 1600 B.C.E.-618 C.E. M.E. Sharpe, Inc.
