= Wang Xianzhi (calligrapher) =

Chinese calligrapher

Wang Xianzhi 王獻之
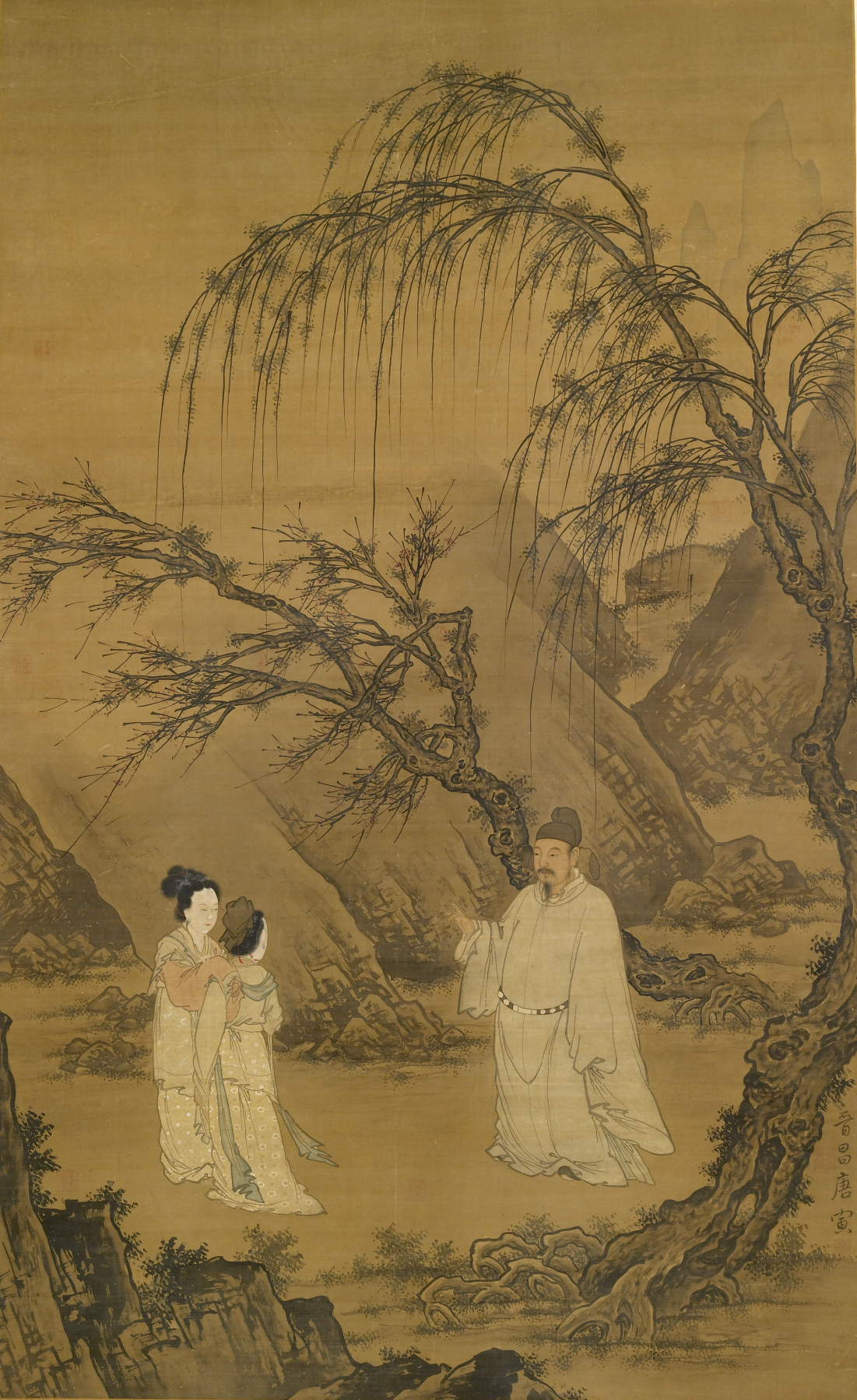
- Wang Xianzhi and Two Wives Among Willows and Rocks by Du Jin (杜堇, b. 1465)
- Born: 344; Shanyin County, Kuaiji Commandery (modern-day Shaoxing)
- Died: 386
- Occupation: Calligrapher
- Writing career
- Period: Eastern Jin dynasty

Wang Xianzhi (simplified Chinese: 王献之; traditional Chinese: 王獻之; pinyin: Wáng Xiànzhī; Wade–Giles: Wang Hsien-chih, 344–386), courtesy name Zijing (子敬), was a famous Chinese calligrapher of the Eastern Jin dynasty.

Xianzhi was born to the Wang clan of Langya, an influential kin group descended from the Qin dynasty general Wang Jian. He was the seventh and youngest son of the famed calligrapher Wang Xizhi. Wang inherited his father's talent for the arts, and although several of his siblings were notable calligraphers, only Xianzhi was able to eventually equal his father in status, with the pair later attaining the appellation, "The Two Wangs (二王 èr wáng)." Wang Xianzhi's (also referred to as "Wang Junior" 小王) style is substantially more fluid and stylistic than that of his father ("Wang Senior" 大王), whose structural firmness nonetheless remains unrivaled. Xianzhi's most celebrated accomplishment is his refinement of the "running-cursive" script (行草), a writing style which, as the name implies, combines features of both the cursive and running scripts. The Duck-Head Pills Letter is an outstanding example of this technique. Another of Xianzhi's accomplishments is the extensive application of the "one-stroke writing" technique for (cursive script), historically (though perhaps incorrectly) attributed to Zhang Zhi (張芝) of the Late Han, which strings together several characters (typically three to four) into a single stroke or renders a complex character in a rather convoluted single stroke. Until the Tang dynasty, Wang Xianzhi's influence and reputation largely surpassed that of his father.

Wang Xizhi noticed Xianzhi's talent early on and started training him in calligraphy at around the age of seven. According to one popular anecdote, Wang Xizhi once unsuccessfully tried to snatch Xianzhi's brush from behind while the latter was writing. Being amazed at Xianzhi's strong grip, Wang Xizhi remarked, "This son of mine is destined for fame!" Wang Xianzhi continued to practice diligently into adulthood until finally becoming as skilled as his father. Xianzhi died at age 42 while still in his prime. By comparison, his father did not produce many of the works he is most known for until his late forties and fifties, including the work he is most well known for (though this attribution remains controversial), Lantingji Xu (lit. 'Preface to the Poems Collected from the Orchid Pavilion'). Along with his father Wang Xizhi, Zhang Zhi and Zhong Yao, Wang Xianzhi is recognized as one of the "Four Worthies of Calligraphy (書中四賢 shūzhōng sìxián)."

== Representative works ==
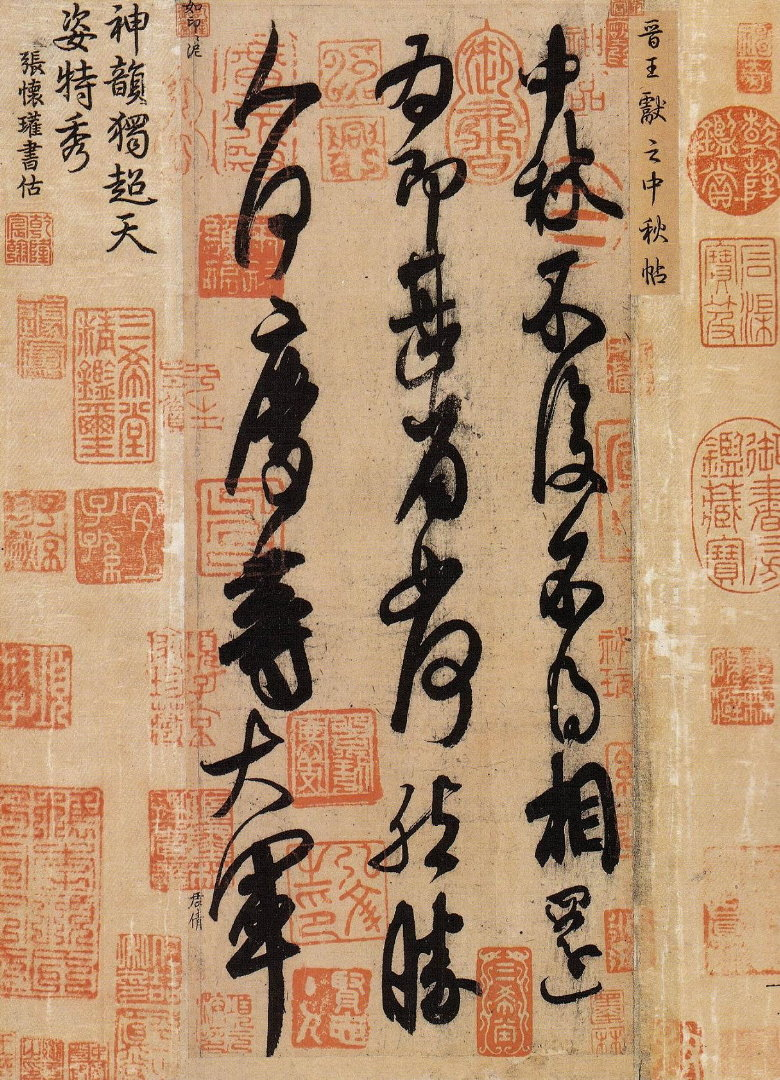
Mid-Autumn Letter (中秋帖)

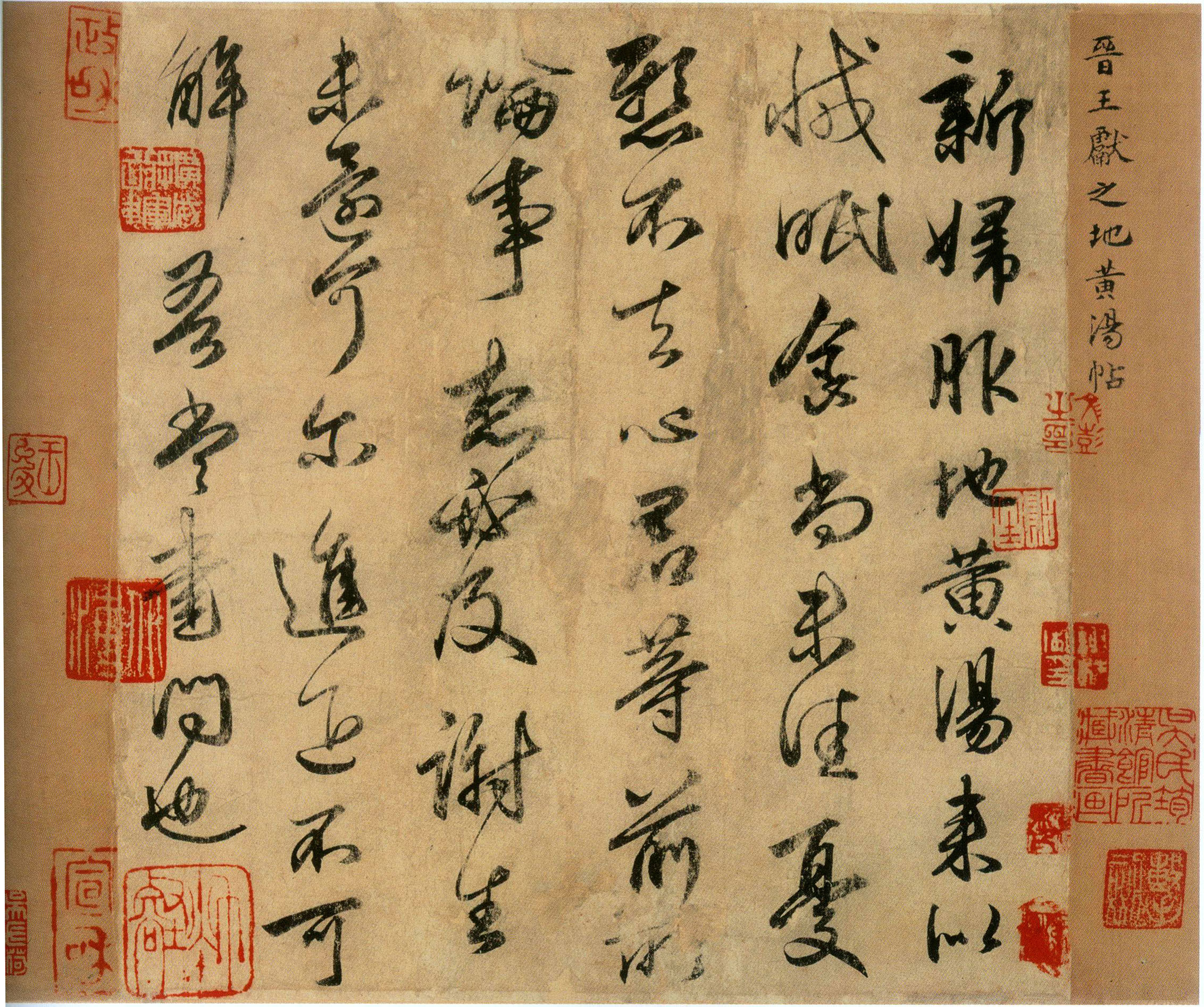
Tang dynasty copy of Dihuang Soup Letter (黃湯帖)

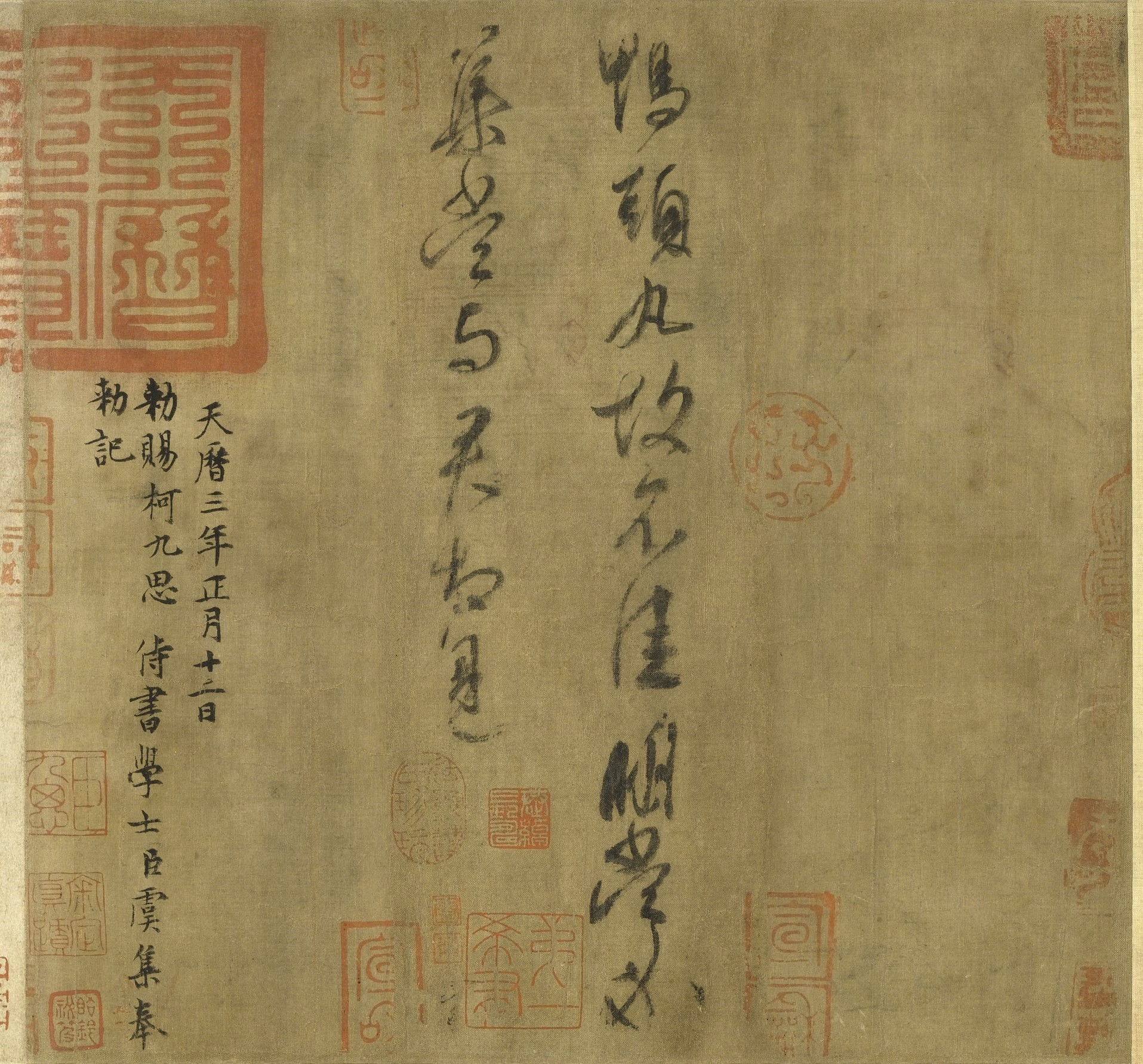
Tang dynasty copy of Duck Head Pills Letter (鴨頭丸帖)

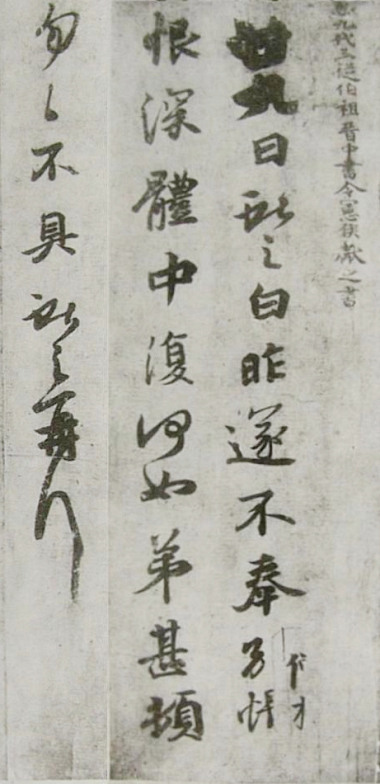
Tang dynasty copy of Twenty-ninth Day Letter (廿九日帖)

== Family ==
Wang Xianzhi's ex-wife Lady Xi was a daughter of Xi Tan (郗昙), son of Xi Jian. (Note: Genealogically, Wang Xianzhi and Lady Xi were cousins as Xi Tan's sister Xi Xuan (郗璿) was Wang Xizhi's wife.) At his deathbed, Wang was once asked if he had any regrets; his reply was that his only regret was divorcing Lady Xi.
