= Wang clan of Langya =

Notable Chinese family

Wang 王
- Clan
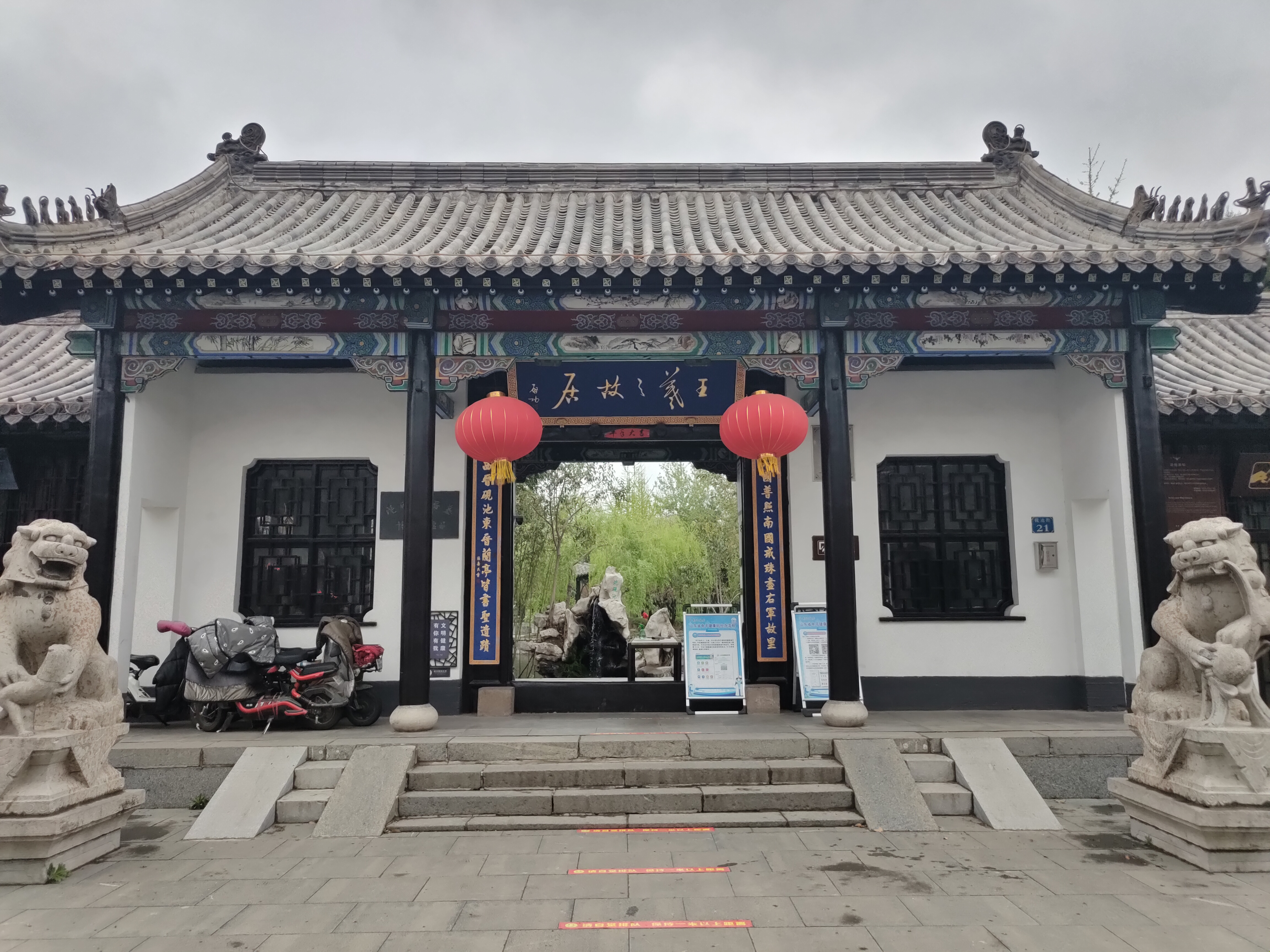
- Former residence of Wang Xizhi in Linyi, Shandong
- Origin: Langya Commandery
- Founded: late Qin dynasty (c. 207 BC)
- Founder: Wang Yuan (a grandson of Wang Ben)
- Titles: Various
- Connected families: Wang clan of Taiyuan
- Dissolution: Five Dynasties and Ten Kingdoms period (c. 900s AD)

The Wang clan of Langya (or Langye) (Chinese: 琅琊王氏) was a Chinese clan which gained political prominence during the Han dynasty and became one of the most powerful non-imperial clans during the Eastern Jin dynasty.

== History ==
=== Origins ===
According to the New Book of Tang, the Wang clan was founded in Langya by Wang Yuan (王元), a great-grandson of Wang Jian. Wang Yuan fled the collapsing Qin dynasty after the death of his father Wang Li (王離) in the battle of Julu. Wang Ji (王吉), a fourth-generation descendant of Wang Yuan, served as an official during the Western Han dynasty, becoming the first recorded member of the clan to hold a position in the imperial bureaucracy.

Wang Wei (王威), the second son of Wang Li, the younger brother of Wang Yuan, was the ancestor of Wang clan of Taiyuan.

=== Jin dynasty ===
During the Western Jin period, Wang Rong was a prominent scion of the clan, reaching the rank of Situ. He was also the youngest member of the Seven Sages of the Bamboo Grove.

After the Disaster of Yongjia, when the Jin capital of Luoyang was sacked by Former Zhao forces, the Langya Wang clan, led by the cousins Wang Dao and Wang Dun, played an instrumental role in the preservation of the Jin dynasty, accompanying the future Emperor Yuan of Jin in leaving Luoyang and heading south to Jiankang (modern day Nanjing). Such was their influence in ensuring stability during the transition from Western to Eastern Jin, and in managing both local rebellions and the interests of refugee clans fleeing from the north, that it was said that "The Tianxia is jointly ruled by the Wang and Sima clans" (王与马，共天下).

== Prominent members ==
=== Qin dynasty ===
- Wang Yuan (王元, ?–?), great-grandson of Wang Jian; founded the clan in Langya after the Battle of Julu

=== Han dynasty ===
- Wang Ji (?–48 BC), Western Han politician (Note: Wang Ji has a biography in vol.72 of Book of Han. He was probably best known for offering advice to then Prince of Changyi Liu He, who was later demoted to Marquis of Haihun.)
- Wang Xiang (184–268), Eastern Han, Cao Wei and Western Jin politician

=== Cao Wei dynasty ===
- Wang Xiong (fl.220-235), Cao Wei official, grandfather of Wang Rong and Wang Yan

=== Jin dynasty ===
- Wang Lan (206-278), Wang Xiang's half-brother, grandfather of Wang Dao and Wang Dun and great-grandfather of Wang Xizhi.
- Wang Rong (234–305), Western Jin politician; grandson of Wang Xiong
- Wang Yan (256 – 311), Western Jin politician; grandson of Wang Xiong
- Wang Dao (276–339), Eastern Jin politician; grandson of Wang Lan
- Wang Dun (266–324), Eastern Jin military commander; grandson of Wang Lan
- Wang Xizhi (303–361), writer and calligrapher; the Lantingji Xu is generally attributed to him. Nephew of Wang Dao and Wang Dun.
- Wang Xianzhi (344–386), calligrapher; son of Wang Xizhi and third cousin of Wang Xun
- Wang Xun (349–400), calligrapher; grandson of Wang Dao and third cousin of Wang Xianzhi

=== Northern and Southern dynasties ===
- Wang Hong (379–432), Liu Song politician
- Wang Jian (452–489), Liu Song and Southern Qi politician, descendant of Wang Dao
- Wang Bao (513–576), writer and poet

=== Tang dynasty ===
- Wang Fangqing, (?–702), Tang and Wu Zhou politician. Wang Fangqing also organized the genealogical records of the clan.
- Wang Yu (?–768), politician
- Wang Tuan (?–900), politician
- Wang Shenzhi, Tang Dynasty military governor, Prince of Min
- Wang Keri (?-767), Tang Dynasty military commander, poet

== See also ==
- Wang clan of Taiyuan, another prominent clan surnamed Wang
