= Han Huang (Jin dynasty) =

Army man from china

- 韓晃

Personal details
- Born: Unknown He County, Anhui
- Died: 329 Mount Pinglang, Liyang, Jiangsu
- Occupation: Military general

Han Huang (died 329) was a Chinese military general of the Jin dynasty (266–420) who served as a subordinate to the rebel Su Jun.

== Life ==
The earliest mention of Han Huang was in 324. That year, Su Jun marched south from Linhuai to join Emperor Ming of Jin's loyalist coalition against the rebel Wang Dun. Su Jun's men had only arrived and were exhausted from marching, which prompted Wang Dun's commanders, Qian Feng and Shen Chong, to attack them immediately. The two crossed the Qinhuai River at Zhuge Islet and captured the barriers before engaging in battle. However, Su Jun ordered Han Huang to flank and attack the rebels from the southern levee, dealing the rebels a huge rout. Wang Dun's insurrection was put down later that year.

In 326, the Later Zhao general Shi Cong (石聰) invaded Jin. The Jin court initially ignored Zu Yue's call for help when Cong attacked Shouchun but panicked when Junqiu (浚遒, in present-day Feidong County, Anhui) and Fuling (阜陵; in present-day Quanjiao County, Anhui) were threatened. Wang Dao was sent to stop him, but just before he could act, Su Jun had already sent Han Huang to help Zu Yue repel Shi Cong. Han Huang and Zu Yue defeated Shi Cong, causing him to retreat back to Zhao.

The following year, Su Jun and Zu Yue rebelled against Jin. Su Jun's first course of action was to capture Jin's food supply at Gushu (姑孰, in present-day Dangtu County, Anhui). Han Huang and his contemporaries went to capture it, and once they did, they marched to Cihu (慈湖, in present-day Jinjiazhung District, Anhui) where they killed the Prefect of Yuhu (于湖, in present-day Wuhu, Anhui), Tao Fu (陶馥) and the general Sima Liu (司馬流). Later, Han Huang campaigned against Huan Yi (father of Huan Wen) at Wuhu. After pushing him back, Han Huang advanced to Xuancheng, pillaging the area before returning to Su Jun.

As loyalist troops began surrounding Su Jun, Su Jun sent Han Huang to Yixing. Han Huang fought with Huan Yi's general Yu Zong (俞縱) at Lanshi (蘭石, in present-day Xuancheng, Anhui). Although Han Huang was close to annihilating Yu Zong's army, Yu refused to retreat and perished in battle. Han Huang proceeded to attack Jing County where Huan Yi had camped. Han Huang killed Huan in battle after Huan's subordinate Jiang Bo (江播) betrayed him.

Han Huang was in the midst of taking Daye (大業, in present-day Suzhou, Jiangsu) when news of Su Jun's death reached him in November. Su Jun's followers had appointed his brother Su Yi (蘇逸) as his successor at Shitou, so Han Huang withdrew from Daye to meet with his new superior. The following year, Han Huang joined Su Yi in attacking the governmental complex at Jiankang. Han Huang fought Mao Bao where the two was said to have exchanged banter. Han said to Mao, "Sir, aren't you renowned for your valour and skill? Why not come out and fight?" to which Mao replied, "Sir, aren't you renowned for your stalwart leadership? Why don't you come in here and fight?" Han laughed before withdrawing.

After the death of Su Jun's other brother, Su Shuo (蘇碩), Han Huang and the rebels became worried as loyalist forces approached Shitou. Han Huang and the others decided to lead Su Yi and his remaining forces to Qu'a (曲阿, in present-day Suzhou, Jiangsu) to join Zhang Jian (張健). However, the passes and gates in Shitou were so narrow that the rebels began stampeding on each other, leaving thousands dead. It also gave loyalist troops ample time to catch up with the rebels. They managed to capture and execute Su Yi, but Han Huang and the others were able to escape, changing their destination to Guzhang.

The loyalist commander, Xi Jian, sent his Army Advisor, Li Hong (李閎), to pursue the remaining rebels. Li Hong caught up with the rebels and surrounded them at Mount Pingling (平陵山, in present-day Liyang, Jiangsu). Zhang Jian and the rest of the rebel leaders were afraid to come down from the mountain, but Han Huang personally went out with two quivers of arrows and sat on a chair. Han Huang took aim at the loyalists and killed many of them. It was not until he ran out of arrows that he would be killed. Shortly after, the rebel commanders surrendered and were executed, thus ending Su Jun's rebellion.
