= Pei Songzhi =

Chinese Eastern Jin and Liu Song historian and politician (372–451)

Pei Songzhi 裴松之
- Born: Family name: Pei (裴); Given name: Songzhi (松之); Courtesy name: Shiqi (世期); 372; Wenxi County, Shanxi
- Died: 451 (aged 78–79)
- Occupations: Historian, politician
- Relatives: Pei Mei (grandfather); Pei Gui (father); Lady Yu (mother; granddaughter of Yu Liang, daughter of Yu Xi and sister of Yu Zhun and Yu Kai) (Note: As Yu Liang's granddaughter, Lady Yu was also a second cousin of Yu Wenjun's grandsons Emperors Mu, Ai, and Fei.); Pei Yin (son); Pei Ziye (great-grandson)
- Writing career
- Years active: 5th century
- Notable works: Annotated Records of the Three Kingdoms; History of Jin; Pei Family Biographies; Ji Zhu Sang Fu Jing Zhuan

Pei Songzhi (372–451), courtesy name Shiqi, was a Chinese historian and politician who lived in the late Eastern Jin dynasty and the Liu Song dynasty. His ancestral home was in Wenxi County, Shanxi, but he moved to the Jiangnan region later. He is best known for making annotations to the historical text Records of the Three Kingdoms (Sanguozhi) written by Chen Shou in the third century, providing additional details omitted from the original work. His commentary, completed in 429, became integral to later editions of the Sanguozhi, making the joint work three times as long as the original. His son, Pei Yin (裴駰), and great-grandson Pei Ziye (裴子野), were also well-known historians.

== Life ==
Pei was born in a family of officials who served in the Eastern Jin government. His grandfather, Pei Mei (裴昧), served as a Household Counsellor (光祿大夫) while his father, Pei Gui (裴珪), was a zheng yuanwailang (正員外郎). Pei was fond of reading since his childhood, and he was already very familiar with classic texts such as the Analects and the Classic of Poetry at the age of eight.

In 391, during the reign of Emperor Xiaowu, Pei became a Palace General (殿中將軍) at the age of 20 (by East Asian reckoning). In 398, during the reign of Emperor An, Pei's maternal uncle, Yu Kai (庾楷), who was the Governor of Yu Province, allied with Wang Gong, the Governor of Yan and Qing provinces, to attack the imperial capital, Jiankang. They were defeated. Yu Kai fled to join the warlord Huan Xuan, after which he nominated Pei to be the Administrator of Xinye, but Pei considered the dangers of joining his uncle and refused to move there. War broke out between the warlords later and Yu Kai was killed by Huan Xuan. Pei survived because he did not join Yu Kai.

In the early fifth century, Pei served as a Regular Mounted Attendant (散騎侍郎) and later as the magistrate (縣令) of Guzhang County. He was recalled to the imperial court later and was promoted to shangshu ci bu lang (尚書祠部郎; a ceremonial official). In 416, the Jin imperial court ordered Liu Yu, the Duke of Song, to lead a campaign against the state of Later Qin. Pei was serving as a registrar (主簿) then when he was ordered to join Liu Yu's army. Liu Yu was very impressed with Pei and praised him as a talented person, and then appointed him as zhizhong congshi shi (治中從事史). After Liu Yu's forces occupied Luoyang, former capital of Jin, Liu Yu appointed Pei as a xianma (洗馬) to assist the heir apparent of his dukedom.

Liu Yu usurped the throne in 420 and ended the Eastern Jin dynasty. He founded the Liu Song dynasty and became historically known as "Emperor Wu of (Liu) Song". Pei took up various appointments in the Liu Song government, including Secretary of the Interior (內史) of Lingling, State Academician (國子博士) and rongcong puye (冗從僕射). In 426, Emperor Wu's son, Emperor Wen, (Note: Emperor Wen was not his father's immediate successor; his half-brother Emperor Shao was deposed before his ascension.) sent officials to inspect the various provinces. Pei was sent to inspect Xiangzhou (湘州). After returning from his trip, Pei drafted 24 clauses based on his observations. He was promoted to Palace Gentleman Writer (中書侍郎) and Grand Judge (大中正) of Si and Ji provinces, and was enfeoffed as the Marquis of Xi District (西鄉侯).

In his later years, Pei served as the Administrator of Yongjia (永嘉太守), tongzhi sanqi changshi (通直散騎常侍), and Administrator of South Langya (南琅邪太守). Pei retired from service at the age of 65 in 437. However, not long later, he was recalled back to the imperial court, and he served as Attendant Counsellor (中散大夫), State Academician (國子博士), and Palace Counsellor (太中大夫). He died of illness at the age of 80 (by East Asian reckoning) in 451.

== Works ==
Emperor Wen of the Liu Song dynasty felt that the historical text Records of the Three Kingdoms (Sanguozhi), written by Chen Shou in the third century, was too brief, so he commissioned Pei to make annotations to the text. Pei collected various sources, including those previously rejected by Chen Shou, and added them to the Sanguozhi, while making annotations and adding his personal commentary as well. His commentary, completed in 429, became integral to later editions of the Sanguozhi, making the joint work three times as long as the original. Emperor Wen praised his work as "immortal".

Apart from making annotations to the Sanguozhi, Pei also wrote other books such as the Jin Ji (晉紀; History of Jin; considered part of the Eighteen History Books of Jin), Pei Shi Jiazhuan (裴氏家傳; Pei Family Biographies), and Ji Zhu Sang Fu Jing Zhuan (集注喪服經傳).

== Ancestors and descendants ==
Pei Songzhi is a member of the Pei clan of Hedong (河东裴氏). His son is Pei Yin, father of Pei Zhaoming (裴昭明; fl.460 (Note: Pei Zhaoming's biography in Book of Southern Qi recorded that he obtained his first government position in the middle part of the Taishi era (466-472) of the reign of Emperor Ming of (Liu) Song. His son Pei Ziye was also born in 471.) - 502), father of Pei Ziye. Through his mother, Pei Songzhi is a great-grandson of the powerful Jin regent Yu Liang. (Note: Pei Songzhi's second cousins include Yu Yue (another great-grandson of Yu Liang), who has a biography in vol.52 of Book of Song. Their third cousins include Yu Dengzhi and Yu Bingzhi (great-grandsons of Yu Bing), who have biographies in vol.53 of Book of Song.)

Pei Songzhi's father is Pei Gui (裴圭), son of Pei Mei (裴昧). Pei Mei's great-grandfather is Pei Kang (裴康). Pei Kang, along with his older brother Pei Li (裴黎), and younger brothers Pei Kai (裴楷) and Pei Chuo (裴绰) were famous during their time and were known as the "4 Peis". One of Pei Kang's daughters was the wife of Sima Yue, Prince Xiaoxian of Donghai. Pei Chuo's son Pei Xia (裴遐) was the father of Pei Mu (裴穆), and the maternal grandfather of Du Lingyang, empress of Emperor Cheng of Jin. A son of Pei Kai was Pei Xian. Pei Kang's son Pei Chun, (Note: Pei Chun being a son of Pei Kang was found in a Jin Zhugong Zan annotation in Pei Qian's biography in Sanguozhi. Pei Qian's younger brother Pei Hui was the father of Pei Li, Pei Kang, Pei Kai and Pei Chuo.) then Administrator of Xingyang, fled to Jianye in June or July 310.
