= Lady Lu (Jin dynasty) =

Military Leader

Lady Lu 陸氏
- Born: Unknown; Jiangsu, China
- Died: Unknown
- Spouse: Zhang Mao
- Children: Three unnamed sons

Lady Lu (fl. 4th century) was the wife of Zhang Mao (張茂; not to be confused with the Former Liang ruler of the same name, Zhang Mao), a military general of the Jin dynasty (266–420). She was noted to have commanded soldiers during Wang Dun's Insurrection in 324, siding with Emperor Ming of Jin's forces against the paramount leader, Wang Dun.

== Life ==
Lady Lu was a native of Wu Commandery and was married to Jin's Administrator of Wu, Zhang Mao. In 322, a civil war broke out between Emperor Yuan of Jin and his powerful commander, Wang Dun. During the war, one of Wang Dun's closest associates, Shen Chong, invaded and captured Wu Commandery. While doing so, he killed Zhang Mao and three of his sons. By the end of the year, Wang Dun had defeated Emperor Yuan's forces and taken control of the Jin government.

In 324, Emperor Yuan's successor, Emperor Ming, began a coalition against Wang Dun to restore imperial rule. Wanting to enact revenge, Lady Lu exhausted her family's wealth to join the campaign against Shen Chong. She served in the forefront of the campaign, commanding over her husband's former troops. She and the other loyalist generals defeated Shen Chong by September 324, and he was later killed by a former subordinate of his, Wu Ru (吳儒).

After Wang Dun and Shen Chong's defeat, Lady Lu visited the palace, where she wrote a letter to Emperor Ming apologizing on Zhang Mao's behalf for having lost his commandery to Shen Chong. Emperor Ming thus issued an edict stating, "Zhang Mao and his wife were both loyal and sincere, and their family have sacrificed greatly for the state's cause. It is only apt that Zhang Mao be posthumously gifted the office of Minister Coachman."
