= Xu Kan =

Jin dynasty and Later Zhao warlord (died 322)

- 徐龕

Administrator of Taishan (泰山太守)
- In office 318 – 319
- Monarch: Emperor Yuan of Jin

Inspector of Yanzhou (兗州刺史) (self-appointed)
- In office 319 – 322
- Monarch: Shi Le/Emperor Yuan of Jin

General Who Stabilizes the North (安北將軍) (self-appointed)
- In office 319 – 322
- Monarch: Shi Le/Emperor Yuan of Jin

Personal details
- Born: Unknown Fei County, Shandong
- Died: 322 Xingtai, Hebei

Xu Kan (died c.August 322) was a Chinese bandit and warlord during the Jin dynasty (266–420) and Sixteen Kingdoms period. Originally an outlaw, Xu Kan was made the Administrator of Taishan by Jin in 318 after driving out the position's initial candidate. Xu possessed autonomy over the commandery and constantly switched allegiance between Jin and its northern rival, Later Zhao whenever he saw fit until his capture by the Zhao general, Shi Hu in 322. Xu Kan had an unusual execution; he was ordered to be stuffed into a bag and thrown off a tall tower to his death before having his body cannibalized.

== Administration of Taishan ==
Xu Kan was from Taishan Commandery and was described as a brave individual. He began a life of banditry by robbing and plundering the local populace, and it was said that he committed his crimes "like a storm". In 318, Sima Yang (司馬颺) was appointed the Administrator of Taishan. According to the biography of Dai Yang (a Jin official and Taoist diviner) in the Jin Shu, Sima Yang was thinking of selling his mansion before departing. Dai Yang warned him not to, as he correctly predicted the prince would not take the post. He was unable to because Taishan was threatened by Xu Kan. That same year, Xu Kan was made Administrator of Taishan.

After his appointment, Jin's Interior Minister of Pengcheng, Zhou Fu (周撫), surrendered to the Han-Zhao general, Shi Le after killing Jin's Interior Minister of Pei, Zhou Mo (周默). In response, the Jin emperor, Sima Rui issued Liu Xia, Cai Bao and Xu Kan to campaign against him. The three generals fought Zhou Fu and decisively defeated him in early 319. After Zhou's defeat, Xu Kan pursued Zhou Fu with his army and beheaded him. Despite Xu's accomplishment, the Jin court honoured Liu Xia first and foremost. This angered Xu Kan, and in April 319, he rebelled in Taishan. He submitted to Shi Le and declared himself Inspector of Yanzhou as well as General Who Stabilizes the North.

== Submissions to Later Zhao ==
=== First ===
Xu Kan raided the Ji (済, around modern day Jinan, Shandong) and Dai (岱, north of modern-day Tai'an, Shandong) regions before eventually breaching into Dongguan Commandery (東莞郡; around present-day Yishui County, Shandong). By June, he had defeated the Prefect of Dongguan, Hou Shimao (侯史旄), and occupied his fortress. As the problem escalated, Sima Rui's advisor, Wang Dao, recommended him to appoint a native of Taishan named Yang Jian to lead against Xu Kan. Yang was made commander with Liu Xia and Cai Bao serving under him. They were also helped from the north by the Xianbei general in Youzhou, Duan Wenyang.

Although Xu Kan had submitted to Shi Le (who by this point had declared independence from Han-Zhao), Shi Le sent his general Shi Hu to attack Taishan as well. Xu Kan panicked as he realized he was being attacked from both his north and south. Xu Kan quickly surrendered back to Jin to avoid total defeat.

=== Second ===
Xu Kan once again rebelled in 320. Yang Jian camped himself at Xiapi while Cai Bao defeated Xu Kan at Tanqiu (檀丘, north-east of modern-day Linyi, Shandong). After his recent defeat, Xu Kan submitted to Shi Le's Later Zhao in September. When asked for reinforcements, Shi Le declined as he claimed was facing larger problems on his part, but on the contrary, he was also overly demanding toward Xu Kan. In the end, Shi Le only sent a few hundred cavalries under Wang Fudu (王伏都) to assist him, with Zhang Jing's (張敬) cavalries acting as reserves.

Relations between Shi Le and Xu Kan broke down further due to Wang Fudu's attitude. Wang displayed an arrogant demeanour toward Xu Kan, refusing to treat him as his equal and violating his wife. Xu Kan was furious and began to doubt his alignment with Shi Le. Zhang Jing then moved his army to Dongping and Xu Kan suspected he was about to be attacked. Xu Kan killed Wang Fudu and 300 of his men before attempting to re-submit to Jin.

This time, Sima Rui refused to accept Xu Kan. He had grown irritated with his actions and believed that he would rebel again in the near future. Instead, he ordered Yang Jian and Cai Bao to intensify the campaign against him. In spite of Sima Rui's order, Yang Jian was still too cautious and refused to advance in order to face Xu Kan. Because of this, he was accused of cowardice and removed from his offices. Cai Bao was chosen to take over his command.

=== Third ===
Shi Le was angered when he heard that Xu Kan had killed Wang Fudu. Shi Le ordered Zhang Jing to remain where he was while Shi Le sent Shi Hu with 40,000 cavalries to subdue Xu Kan. With Jin rejecting his surrender, Xu Kan sent his advisor, Liu Xiao (劉霄) to send his wife and children to Zhao's capital, Xiangguo to serve as hostages. Xu Kan pleaded with Shi Le to accept his surrender, and so Shi Le did.

Cai Bao advanced into Biancheng (卞城, in modern-day Sishui County, Shandong) where he was surprised to find that Shi Hu had camped himself in Juping (巨平, in modern-day Tai'an, Shandong). Cai Bao's army was encircled by Shi Hu and Xu Kan's forces. Cai Bao retreated to Xiapi after he was defeated by Shi Hu. Xu Kan attacked Cai Bao's supply lines in Tanqiu and killed his generals Lu Dang (陸黨) and Liu Chong (留寵). Cai Bao was later sentenced to death by Sima Rui in Jiankang for his defeat.

== Downfall and death ==
For unknown reasons, Xu Kan once more offered his surrender to Jin in February 321 and was accepted. Shi Le did not respond immediately and would only issue an attack on him in 322. In similar fashion, he sent Shi Hu with 40,000 elite troops to attack Xu Kan. Xu refused to bring out his army for battle and kept to his defences. Shi Hu thus built long siege lines to besiege him. Eventually, Shi Hu took over Taishan and had Xu Kan sent to Xiangguo.

Xu Kan's defections had caused Shi Le to despise him greatly. As a result, Shi Le ordered Xu Kan to be stuffed into a bag and thrown off the top of a tower which stood a hundred chi tall (roughly 23.7 metres or 77.8 ft) to his death. Shi Le then ordered the wives and children of Wang Fudu and the Zhao soldiers that Xu Kan had killed to carve up his body for them to consume. 3,000 of Xu Kan's soldiers that had surrendered were also buried alive after his defeat.
