= Liu Xia (Jin dynasty) =

Jin dynasty official and general (died 326)

- 劉遐

Inspector of Xu province (徐州刺史)
- In office 324 – 326
- Monarch: Emperor Ming of Jin/ Emperor Cheng of Jin

Personal details
- Born: Unknown Yongnian, Handan, Hebei
- Died: 20 July 326 Huai'an, Jiangsu
- Spouse: Lady Shao
- Children: Liu Zhao
- Courtesy name: Zhengchang (正長)
- Peerage: Duke of Quanling (泉陵公)

Liu Xia (died 20 July 326), courtesy name Zhengchang, was a military general of the Jin dynasty (266–420). He was a manor lord (塢主; wùzhǔ) during the fall of Western Jin who later moved south and helped the Eastern Jin in quelling Wang Dun's rebellion. He was also the husband of Lady Shao, one of the few women in the period who was recorded to have fought in battle.

== Life ==
Liu Xia was a native of Yiyang County (易陽; in present-day Yongnian, Hebei) in Guangping Commadery. He was described as resolute and courageous, as well as skilled in archery and horsemanship. During the fall of Western Jin, he became a manor lord, fortifying his position between the Yellow and Ji rivers. Liu Xia was renowned for leading brave warriors to break through enemy lines and crush bandits, and the people of his time compared him to Zhang Fei and Guan Yu. The Inspector of Ji province and his fellow native, Shao Xu, admired him and married his daughter, Lady Shao to him.

At the same time, Liu Xia sent an envoy through a secret route to receive orders from the Prince of Langya, Sima Rui in the south at Jiankang. The prince's court praised his conduct, issuing a letter of commendation and appointing him as the Prancing-Dragon General and Interior Minister of Pingyuan. In 317, Emperor Yuan further made him the Administrator of Xiapi.

In 318, the Interior Minister of Pengcheng, Zhou Fu (周撫) (Note: not to be confused with the son of Zhou Fang with the same name) killed the Interior Minister of Pei princely fief, Zhou Mo (周默). He then surrendered his territory to the Han-Zhao general, Shi Le, who sent his cavalry to reinforce him. Liu Xia was appointed the new Interior Minister of Pengcheng, and together with the Inspector of Xu province, Cai Bao and the Administrator of Taishan, Xu Kan, then attacked Zhou Fu. They defeated Zhou at Hanshan (寒山; in present-day Xuzhou, Jiangsu), and Liu Xia was transferred to Administrator of Linhuai. However, the court's decision to reward Liu Xia first before him angered Xu Kan, who rebelled and surrendered to Shi Le. Liu Xia partook in the campaign to quell his uprising, and after their victory, he was appointed North General of the Household and Inspector of Yan province.

In 324, due to the growing power of Shi Le's new state of Later Zhao, Liu Xia moved his garrison south from Pengcheng to Sikou (泗口, located at Xuzhou, Jiangsu). When the Jin commander, Wang Dun, Wang Han and their followers rebelled later that year, he and a fellow refugee leader, Su Jun sided with the imperial army and led their troops to defend Jiankang. The rebel commanders, Shen Chong and Qian Feng fought them at the Xuanyang Gate, but Liu Xia and Su Jun routed them. Liu Xia then pursued Shen Chong to Qingxi (青溪; in present-day Qinhuai, Nanjing), where he defeated Shen again and forced the rebel army to scatter.

Liu Xia followed the Intendant of Danyang, Wen Jiao to chase after Wang Han to Huainan, where Liu Xia allowed his troops to plunder. Wen Jiao remonstrated him for taking advantage of the confusion to create more chaos, prompting Liu to deeply apologize and bow in gratitude. After the rebellion was crushed, Liu Xia was enfeoffed the Duke of Quanling and promoted to Regular Mounted Attendant, Supervisor of military affairs in the Huaibei, North General of the Household and Inspector of Xu province, replacing Wang Sui in garrisoning Huaiyin (淮陰, in modern Huai'an, Jiangsu).

Liu Xia soon died in 326. He was posthumously given the position of General Who Maintains the North. His son, Liu Zhao (劉肇) was too young to lead his men at the time, so his army was given to the general, Guo Mo instead.
