= Pei Ziye =

Chinese official and historian (471–532)

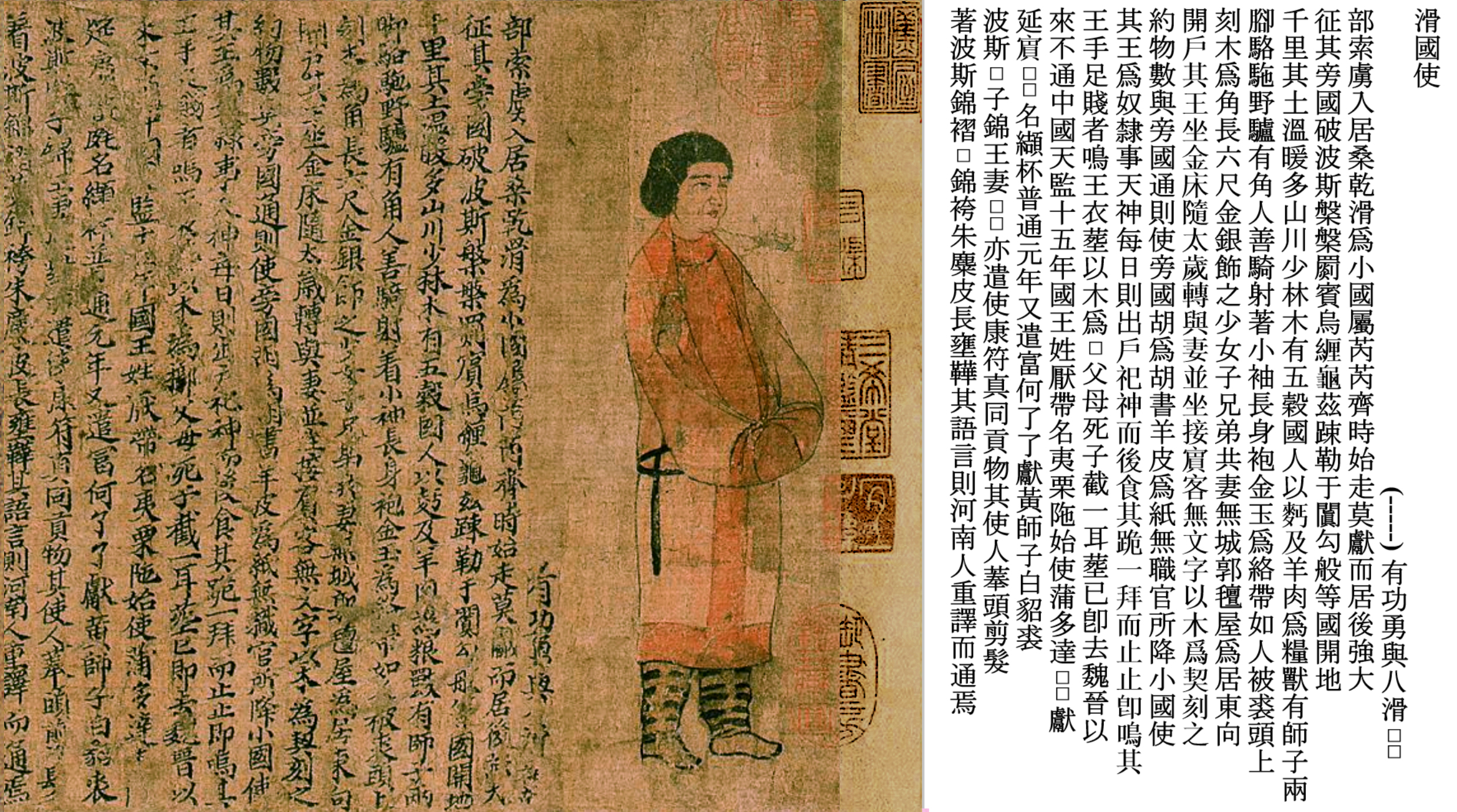
One of the Hephthalite (滑, Hua) ambassadors whom Pei Ziye commented upon, at the Chinese court of Emperor Yuan of Liang in his capital Jingzhou in 516–520 CE, with explanatory text. Portraits of Periodical Offering of Liang, 11th century Song copy.

Pei Ziye (裴子野, 471–532) was a Chinese historian of the southern Liang dynasty; he lived through the Liu Song and Southern Qi dynasties. He was the grandson of another historian, Pei Yin (裴駰), a son of the famous historian Pei Songzhi.

== Childhood ==
Pei Ziye's mother Lady Wei died when he was born, and he was brought up by his grandmother Lady Yin. When Pei was nine (by East Asian reckoning), Lady Yin died; in his sorrow, Pei cried until he had blood in his tears.

== Theory on origin of the Hephthalites ==
Pei Ziye is, among other things, known for making a mistaken conjecture about the origin of the Hephthalites, who just sent an embassy at the Chinese court of the Liang dynasty in 516 CE, saying that they may be descendants of the Jushi based on a false etymology. This account appears in Pei Ziye's biography in Liangshu (Volume 30):

是時西北徼外有白題及滑國，遣使由岷山道入貢。此二國歷代弗賓，莫知所出。子野曰：「漢潁陰侯斬胡白題將一人。服虔《注》云：『白題，胡名也。』又漢定遠侯擊虜，八滑從之，此其後乎。」時人服其博識。
During this period, there were beyond the Northwestern frontier, the states of Boti and Hua, who sent envoys through the mountain road of the Min (river, in Sichuan) to offer tribute. These two states had not been guests of the successive dynasties, their origin was unknown. Ziye said: "There was Baiti, a hu general who was killed by Marquis Yingyin of Han. Fu Qian's commentary to the Hanshu says: 'Baiti is a hu name'. Moreover, it is known that the Marquis Dingyuan was accompanied by Bahua when attacking the Barbarians, so perhaps these two states are their descendants." His contemporaries admired his wide knowledge.

— Liangshu (Volume 30).

In effect, many foreign embassies visited the Chinese court at that time, and particularly three Hephthalite (Hua) ambassadors are known, who visited in 516–520 CE, and are described in the Portraits of Periodical Offering.

The Emperor then ordered Pei Ziye to write an illustrated account of foreign embassies, Fangguoshitu (方國使圖), which may have been the basis for the original Portraits of Periodical Offering of Liang, and the Hephthalites account of the Liangshu (Volume 54), and this account again mentioned Pei Ziye's wrong conjectural etymology.

== Summary of Song ==
Another of Pei Ziye's achievements was his distillation of Shen Yue's Book of Song (《宋书》) into a more succinct version, Summary of Song (《宋略》); after reading Summary of Song, Shen was recorded to have said, "This is a standard which I cannot reach."

== Ancestors ==
Pei Ziye is a member of the Pei clan of Hedong (河东裴氏). His father is Pei Zhaoming (裴昭明; fl.460 - 502), son of Pei Yin, son of Pei Songzhi. Pei Songzhi's father is Pei Gui (裴圭), son of Pei Mei (裴昧). Pei Mei's great-grandfather is Pei Kang (裴康). Pei Kang, along with his older brother Pei Li (裴黎), and younger brothers Pei Kai (裴楷; father of Pei Xian) and Pei Chuo (裴绰) were famous during their time and were known as the "4 Peis".

Through Pei Songzhi's mother Lady Yu, Pei Ziye was also a descendant of the Jin regent Yu Liang.
