= Pei Xian =

3rd to 4th century Jin dynasty and Later Zhao minister

- 裴憲

Inspector of Yuzhou (豫州刺史)
- In office ?–311
- Monarch: Emperor Huai of Jin

Minister Over the Masses (司徒)
- In office ?–?
- Monarch: Shi Le/Shi Hong/Shi Hu

Personal details
- Born: Unknown Wenxi County, Shanxi
- Died: Unknown
- Children: Pei Yi; Pei Jue
- Parent: Pei Kai (father)
- Courtesy name: Jingsi (景思)
- Peerage: Duke of Anding

Pei Xian (fl.291-334), courtesy name Jingsi, was an official of the Jin dynasty (266–420) and the Han-Zhao and Later Zhao dynasties during the Sixteen Kingdoms period. A member of the prestigious Pei clan of Hedong, he initially served under the Jin as a military general, but was later captured and followed the Han general, Shi Le. After Shi Le founded the Later Zhao and became emperor, Pei Xian became an important minister in laying the framework for the new imperial government.

== Life ==
=== Early life and career ===
Pei Xian was from the famous Pei clan of Hedong as the son of Prefect of the Palace Writers, Pei Kai (237-291); (Note: Pei Kai's brother Pei Kang was an ancestor of Pei Songzhi.) his cousins included Princess Pei, the wife of Sima Yue, and Pei Xia (裴遐), maternal grandfather of Du Lingyang, empress of Emperor Cheng of Jin. He was described as intelligent from a young age and liked to associate himself with chivalrous men. When he was 20 years old, he decided to change his ways and devoted himself to Confucianism. He did not leave his hometown for many years and during this time, he met the scholars Xie Kun (谢鲲; 281 - 10 Jan 324; (Note: Xie Kun's epitaph indicated that he died on the 28th day of the 11th month of the 1st year of the Taining era of the reign of Emperor Ming of Jin, while his biography in vol.49 of Jin Shu recorded that he was 43 (by East Asian reckoning) when he died.) father of Xie Shang) and Yu Ai (庾敳; 262 - 5 May 311), (Note: Yu Ai's biography in vol.50 of Jin Shu recorded that he was 50 (by East Asian reckoning) when he was killed together with Wang Yan. He was also a cousin of Yu Chen (father of Yu Liang).) who both who praised him for his talents and character, even stating that he surpassed his own father.

Pei Xian eventually entered the Western Jin government as the Resident Instructor of the Eastern Palace, as well as a Palace Attendant and Gentleman of the Imperial Secretariat of the Yellow Gate. The Prince of Donghai and regent, Sima Yue, was married to his cousin, Princess Pei (daughter of Pei Kang, elder brother of Pei Kai). He later appointed Pei Xian the Inspector of Yu province and the General of the Household Gentlemen of the North.

=== War with Han-Zhao ===
At the time, the Jin was at war with the Han-Zhao dynasty in northern China. In 308, Han forces led by Shi Le and Wang Mi attacked Ye, and the local commander, He Yu (和郁) abandoned the city and fled. In response, the imperial court ordered Pei Xian to lead his troops to Baima (白馬; near present-day Hua County, Henan) to campaign against Wang Mi, while another general, Wang Kan (王堪) was sent to Dongyan (東燕; in present-day Fengyang, Anhui) to oppose Shi Le.

In 309, Shi Le invaded Xindu Commandery and killed the Inspector of Ji province, Wang Bin (王斌). Pei Xian and Wang Kan were ordered by the court to move against him. Upon hearing the news, Shi Le burnt all his supplies and camps before tuning around and occupying Huangniu Ramparts (黃牛壘) to face them. Soon after, the Administrator of Wei Commandery, Liu Ju (劉矩) surrendered his commandery to Shi Le, who then led his forces to Liyang (黎陽; present-day Xun County, Henan). Pei Xian abandoned his army and fled to south of the Huai river, while Wang Kan retreated to Cangyuan (倉垣, in modern Kaifeng, Henan).

In 311, Sima Yue died of illness and Emperor Huai of Jin was captured at Luoyang by Han forces in the Disaster of Yongjia. A provisional government was set up by Xun Fan, and he granted the Prince of Langya, Sima Rui, who ruled over the Jiangnan region, power to appoint and dismiss high-ranking officials. Both Pei Xian and the Inspector of Jiang province Hua Yi refused to acknowledge Sima Rui's new authority. Thus, the prince sent his generals, Wang Dun, Gan Zhuo and others to attack them.

After Hua Yi was defeated and killed, Pei Xian fled to You province, where he joined the provincial inspector, Wang Jun. Not long after, Wang Jun set up his own provisional government and installed a new crown prince, though his name was not recorded. He also appointed Pei Xian as a Master of Writing.

=== Capture and service under Shi Le ===
In 314, Wang Jun was captured and sent for execution at the Han capital by Shi Le. Wang Jun's associates including Zao Song (棗嵩) all rushed to apologize for their crimes and offered bribes to Shi Le, but only Pei Xian and his peer, Xun Chuo (荀綽; grandson of Xun Xu and a nephew of Xun Fan) refused to meet him. Shi Le eventually summoned them and questioned their refusal to save themselves. Pei Xian appeared calm at first but then cried as he said, "Our families have served Jin for generations and have enjoyed its honours and fortunes. Though Wang Jun was ruthless and crude, he was still a vassal of Jin, and so we followed him and dared not think otherwise. If Honorable Lord (Note: "Minggong" here is a form of expression, used to address someone with high social status.)(Shi Le) does not cultivate virtue and righteousness but is bent on intimidation and punishment, then our only wish is to die. What other escape is there? Please grant us death."

The two then left without performing obeisance. Shi Le summoned them back and apologized, treating them both as distinguished guests. When Shi Le went to investigate the homes of Wang Jun's aides and relatives, he found that they had hoard an enormous amount of wealth. Meanwhile, Pei Xian and Xun Chuo only had over a hundred volumes of books along with a few piles of salt and rice. Shi Le said to his advisor Zhang Bin, "Their reputations are well deserved. I am not happy that I have captured You province; I am happy that I have gained these two." Pei Xian was appointed Assistant Officer of the Household while Xun Chuo was appointed an Army Advisor.

In 318, the consort kin Jin Zhun massacred the Han imperial family at Pingyang, dug up the tombs of Liu Yuan and Liu Cong and burnt down the ancestral temple. Shi Le and Liu Yao led their forces against him, and after his defeat, Shi Le appointed Pei Xian, along with Shi Hui (石会), to restore Liu Yuan's and Liu Cong's tombs.

=== Service under Later Zhao ===
In 319, Shi Le broke away from the Han-Zhao and established the Later Zhao dynasty. He appointed Pei Xian as Libationer of Education in the Classics. Pei Xian later left the court to serve as Administrator of Changle Commandery, and he was then promoted to Prefect of the Gentlemen of the Palace.

In 330, after Shi Le assumed the title of Heavenly King, he made Pei Xian a Master of Writing. Later that year, Shi Le elevated himself to Emperor, but at the time, the national institutions had not been put in place. Pei Xian and his fellow minister, Wang Bo (王波) aided him by compiling court rites and establishing a cultural charter, modelling them after the previous dynasties. He also compiled the "San Zhengdonggeng Yi" (三正東耕儀) which concerned the emperor's allocation of land. Shi Le was pleased by his work and showed him even more favour, promoting him to Palace Counsellor and then to Minister Over the Masses.

Pei Xian was shown more respect and esteem during the reign of Shi Hu, though he was embroiled in a controversy involving his sons, Pei Yi (裴挹) and Pei Jue (裴瑴). His sons were both literary talents, with Pei Jue even becoming an official in the Zhao government. As nobles, they enjoyed drinking and evaluating people, but were at odds with Xing Yu (邢魚) of Hejian Commandery. One day, Xing Yu stole Pei Jue's horse and fled to Duan Liao, leader of the Duan tribe in Liaoxi, but was captured along the way. Xing Yu admitted that he had information that Shi Hu was preparing a campaign against the Duan, and that he was trying to warn Duan Liao beforehand. However, he also implicated Pei Jue by claiming that he had been acting under his orders. Shi Hu was indeed planning to attack the Duan, and after being informed, he had Pei Yi and Pei Jue executed. Pei Xian was dismissed from his office as well, but shortly after, he was invited back to serve as Household Counselor With Golden Tassel of the Right, Minister Over the Masses and Grand Tutor. He was also enfeoffed as the Duke of Anding Commandery.

Though he held various high-ranking offices, records describe Pei Xian as showing no interest at attaining success. He was further described as being calm and collected in court with very little to say, not paying much attention to affairs within the court. However, his reputation grew due to his virtue, and he was always respected and treated with courtesy. He eventually died in an unknown year and was succeeded by Pei Mai (裴邁), the son of his clan member, Pei Zhi (裴峙).
