= Pei clan of Hedong =

The Pei clan of Hedong (河東裴氏) was a notable Chinese clan politically active from the Han dynasty to the end of the Five Dynasties and Ten Kingdoms period. Their ancestral home was in Hedong Commandery. Their founding father was Pei Ling (裴陵), the Lord of Jiepei (解𨛬君), who descended from the archaic Feng clan.

The Pei clan came to power during the Eastern Han dynasty. Many members of this clan held key appointments in the central government or in commanderies. While being politically influential, the Pei family was also renowned for their scholarship in the study of Confucian classics. The eight Peis (八裴) refer to eight siblings from the Pei family whose fame was on par with the Wang family of Langya, another prominent political family who played an important role in the Six Dynasties era. During the Six Dynasties era, the members of the Pei family served different empires and each of them contributed to the cementing of the Pei family's political influence.

When the Sui dynasty of northern China conquered the Chen dynasty of southern China in 590 and unified China under its rule, the branches of the Pei clan who served in these two different dynasties were also reunited. During the Tang dynasty, the Pei clan reached the pinnacle of prosperity and glory. 17 men from the Pei clan served as chancellors in the Tang imperial government, while there were numerous others who held lesser appointments. Some notable figures such as Pei Du, Pei Xingjian, and Pei Yaoqing dedicated their lives to serving the Tang Empire.

The Pei clan suffered severe damage during the chaotic years leading to the end of the Tang dynasty, and during the Five Dynasties and Ten Kingdoms period which immediately followed the end of the Tang dynasty. The Pei family was never able to recover their political influence and ended up dissolving into different social classes.

== Origins of the Pei clan ==
The origin of the Pei clan is disputed by scholars of Chinese history. Lin Bao, a Confucian scholar of rites, argues that the Pei family descended from Feizi, the founder of the Qin state, the forerunner of the Qin dynasty. On the other hand, some epitaphs of the members of Pei family trace their origins to Pei Zhen, an exiled Qin noble who went to the Jin state and received a fief from Duke Ping, the Jin ruler. The fief was named Pei, so his descendants adopted Pei as their family name. In both cases, the Pei clan was distantly related to Qin Shi Huang, the first emperor of the Qin dynasty who directly descended from Feizi.

== Branches ==
These were the branches and some sub-branches of the Pei family of Hedong. The branches of the Pei family were also referred to as Juan (眷) in Chinese.

- Western Juan Pei (西眷裴)
  - Middle Juan Pei (中眷裴)
  - Xima Pei (洗馬裴)
  - Wu Pei from South (南來吳裴)
- Eastern Juan Pei (東眷裴)

Related clans

- Zhao clan of Tianshui, who also descended from Feizi like the Pei family
- Liu clan of Hedong, who lived in the same commandery as the Pei family

== Notable members ==
- Pei Qian, Eastern Han and Cao Wei official
- Pei Xiu, Cao Wei and Western Jin official, son of Pei Qian
- Pei Wei, Western Jin official, son of Pei Xiu
- Pei Kang, Cao Wei and Western Jin official, nephew of Pei Qian
- Lady Pei, daughter of Pei Kang, wife of Sima Yue
- Pei Kai, Cao Wei and Western Jin official, younger brother of Pei Kang
- Pei Xian, Western Jin, Han-Zhao and Later Zhao official, son of Pei Kai
- Pei Mu, mother of Empress Du Lingyang
- Pei Songzhi, Eastern Jin and Liu Song dynasty official and historian, fifth-generation descendant of Pei Kang
- Pei Ziye, Southern Qi and Liang dynasty official and historian, great-grandson of Pei Songzhi

== Ancestral temple ==
The oldest surviving ancestral shrine in China is the Pei clan shrine (裴氏祠).
