= Emperor Cheng =

Emperor Cheng may refer to:

- Emperor Cheng of Han (51–7 BC)
- Emperor Cheng of Jin (321–342)
