= Sima Yan (disambiguation) =

Sīmǎ Yán (司馬炎) is the personal name of Emperor Wu of Jin, the founding monarch of Jin dynasty (266–420).

"Sima Yan" may also refer to:

- Sīmǎ Yǎn (司馬演), eleventh son of Emperor Wu of Jin;
- Sīmǎ Yàn (司馬晏), another son of Emperor Wu of Jin and father of Emperor Min of Jin;
- Sīmǎ Yǎn (司馬衍), personal name of Emperor Cheng of Jin.
