= Lady Xun =

Mother of Emperor Ming of Jin (died 335)

Lady Xun (Chinese: 荀; pinyin: Xún; died 335), formally Lady of Yuzhang (豫章君), was a concubine of Emperor Yuan of Jin (Sima Rui) while he was the Prince of Langye. Initially, he favored her greatly; the couple had two sons – Sima Shao (Emperor Ming) and Sima Pou (司馬裒). Because of the favor that she received, Sima Rui's wife Princess Yu Mengmu (虞孟母) was very jealous of her and mistreated her. Lady Xun, not happy about her low station and Princess Yu's mistreatment, often complained and was rebuked by Prince Rui. Eventually, he threw her out of the household. After Sima Shao succeeded to the throne as Emperor Ming in January 323, he gave her a mansion and created her the Lady of Jian'an. Later that year, he welcomed her back to the palace. After he died in October 325 and his son Emperor Cheng ascended the throne, she was treated as virtual empress dowager without the title, and she probably effectively raised Emperor Cheng, since Emperor Cheng's mother Yu Wenjun died in 328 in the midst of the Su Jun Disturbance, while Emperor Cheng was only seven. She died in 335 and was posthumously created the Lady of Yuzhang. A temple was built for her and Emperor Cheng issued an edict mourning her. Some sources mention that she was a Xianbei, and that Sima Shao inherited her exotic looks.
