= Lady Shao =

Jin dynasty (266–420) general Liu Xia's wife

Lady Shao 邵氏
- Born: Unknown; Anyang County, Henan
- Died: Unknown; Nanjing, Jiangsu
- Spouse: Liu Xia
- Children: Liu Zhao
- Father: Shao Xu
- Relatives: Shao Ai (brother); Shao Ji (brother)

Lady Shao (fl. 4th century) was the wife of Liu Xia, a military general during the Jin dynasty (266–420). She was one of the few recorded women from her period to have fought in battle, commanding a small group of soldiers to save her husband from encirclement. After her husband's death, she helped in quelling a mutiny by his former soldiers.

== Life ==
Very little is recorded about Lady Shao, but she was deemed worthy enough to receive an entry within her husband's biography in the Book of Jin. Records also only refer to her as "[Liu] Xia's wife" (遐妻), contrary to how traditional historians would bestow the name 'shi' (氏) after a woman's surname if her given name is not known (i.e., Shaoshi (邵氏)). Lady Shao was from Anyang County, Wei Commandery, and she was the daughter of the Jin official, Shao Xu. She was described as having inherited her father's bravery and resolve.

Early in the 4th century, northern China was in the midst of being conquered by the Han-Zhao dynasty. In 314, Shao Xu took up arms against Han in Yanci (厭次, around present-day Dezhou, Shandong) and became one of the Jin dynasty's northern vassals, acting as their Inspector of Jizhou. Meanwhile, a manor lord named Liu Xia was operating between the Ji River and Yellow River, also at odds with Han. Liu Xia was famed for his strength and was from the same province as the Shao family. Shao Xu respected Liu Xia's strength, and so he wedded him to Lady Shao.

Lady Shao evidently followed Liu Xia throughout their marriage. The biggest threat to Liu Xia's position was the Han general, Shi Le, who later founded the Later Zhao dynasty in northeastern China. At some point during his time in the north, Liu Xia was surrounded by the forces of Shi Le's general, Shi Hu. Lady Shao quickly formed a small group of cavalry and led them to save her husband. Despite being outnumbered, she was able to fight her way to Liu Xia and bring him back to safety.

Eventually, Liu Xia was forced to relocate further south due to Later Zhao's growing power. In 320, the Zhao captured Shao Xu, and just a year later, Lady Shao's family surrendered their territory and themselves to them. In 324, Liu Xia camped in Sikou (泗口, located at Xuzhou, Jiangsu), where he continued serving Jin before dying in 326. Lady Shao had at least one son with Liu Xia, who they named Liu Zhao (劉肇).

Liu Zhao was Liu Xia's heir, but at the time of Xia's death, Zhao was too young to assume his father's responsibilities. For this reason, the Jin court appointed the general, Guo Mo to take command of Xia's army. Liu Xia's generals, including his brother-in-law, Tian Fang (田防), were not happy to serve under someone else. Therefore, they proclaimed Liu Zhao as their leader and rebelled. Lady Shao tried to stop the revolt by advising the generals against their decision, but she was dismissed.

The Jin court sent the general, Liu Jiao (劉矯), to defeat the rebels in response to the rebellion. Meanwhile, Lady Shao undermined the revolt by secretly setting fire to the armoury, depriving the rebels of their weapons and armor. Because of this, when Liu Jiao arrived, the rebels were ill-equipped and easily defeated. The rebels and their leaders were beheaded, while Liu Zhao was spared and conferred his father's title. Lady Shao, along with her children, mother-in-law, and Liu Xia's subordinates, was moved to the Jin capital, Jiankang, where she likely spent the remainder of her life.
