= Qian Feng =

Chinese Jin dynasty official and rebel (died 324)

- 錢鳳

Army Advisor of Armour Management (鎧曹參軍)
- In office ?–324
- Monarch: Emperor Yuan of Jin/Emperor Ming of Jin

Personal details
- Born: Unknown Huzhou, Zhejiang
- Died: 324 Nanjing, Jiangsu
- Courtesy name: Shiyi (世儀)

Qian Feng (died 324) was an official of the Jin dynasty (266–420). He was a highly trusted partisan of the powerful commander, Wang Dun, who he often discussed plans with for Wang to usurp the Jin throne. When their plans were leaked to the imperial court, Emperor Ming of Jin issued a call to arms against Wang Dun, specifically denouncing Qian Feng and marking him for death. When Wang Dun died of illness shortly after, Qian Feng continued to resist the imperial forces with Wang's elder brother, Wang Han and Shen Chong, but they were soon defeated and killed.

== Life ==
Qian Feng was a member of the Qian clan of Wuxing Commandery. He became an Army Advisor of Armour Management for the commander, Wang Dun at the recommendation of his fellow native, Shen Chong. As his two closest advisors, Qian and Shen knew of Wang Dun's rebellious intent, assisting him in his schemes to attain his imperial ambitions. Early on, Qian was jealous of the general, Tao Kan and often slandered him to Wang Dun. His superior soon grew apprehensive of Tao, and in 315, he had Tao reassigned to Inspector of Guang province in the far south.

While Shen Chong was tasked with supervising the Three Wu regions, Qian Feng remained by Wang Dun's side as a consultant. In 322, Wang Dun launched an insurrection against Emperor Yuan of Jin and seized the capital, Jiankang. After Emperor Yuan appointed him Prime Minister, Wang affirmed Qian Feng and Shen Chong roles as his chief advisors. (Note: Emperor Yuan died soon after this submission, in January 323.) When Wang Dun fell ill later in 323, Qian advised him to do away with the influential Interior Minister of Kuaiji, Zhou Zha (son of Zhou Chu), so Wang ordered Shen Chong and others to purge the Zhou clan of Yixing.

However, as his condition worsened, Wang delegated his military command over to his elder brother, Wang Han in 324. Qian Feng asked Wang Dun if they should acclaim his adopted son, Wang Ying (王應) as their new leader after his death, but Wang Dun disapproved, instead encouraging Qian and the rest to disband their armies and surrender to the imperial court. However, Qian insisted that their forces should bring the court to heel through a decisive battle, so he secretly reached an agreement with Shen Chong to launch a rebellion once Wang Dun died.

Meanwhile, Wang Dun's and Qian Feng's plot to seize the throne was being leaked to Emperor Ming of Jin. On one occasion, while Wang and Qian were discussing their plans, Wang Dun's cousin's son, Wang Yunzhi overheard and informed their conversations to his father, Wang Shu, who in turn relayed it to Emperor Ming. Qian Feng also became close friends with Wang Dun's Marshal, Wen Jiao, who spoke highly of Qian's reputation. In reality, however, Wen was secretly loyal to the emperor and intended to gather information from within Wang Dun's camp.

Later in 324, Wen Jiao advised Wang Dun that the vacant Intendant of Danyang at the capital needed to be fill and recommended Qian Hui to the position. Qian rejected the office and offered it to Wen, who also pretended to declined. In the end, Wang decided on Wen Jiao and entrusted him with spying on the court. Worried that Qian would raise further objections, at his farewell banquet, Wen pretended to be drunk, knocked Qian's headdress with his hand tablet and scolded him for refusing to drink. Wang, believing that Wen had too much to drink, broke up the fight. The next day after Wen had left, Qian warned Wang that Wen had close ties with the emperor's uncle, Yu Liang and cannot be trusted, but Wang ignored him, thinking that Qian was only slandering because of their altercation.

However, as Qian had feared, Wen Jiao informed Emperor Ming about all of Wang Dun's plans, and the emperor soon denounced them as rebels and issued a call to arms. In his edict, Emperor Ming claimed that Wang Dun was already dead and pinned the blame on Qian Feng, offering a marquisate of 5,000 households and 5,000 rolls of cloth to anyone in exchange for his head. Qian Feng and others were placed under Wang Han's command to march against Jiankang with 50,000 troops. Before they left, Qian Feng asked Wang Dun on what they should do to Emperor Ming once they attained victory, to which he replied to do as they will as long as they do not harm the Prince of Donghai, Sima Chong (司馬沖) and Princess Pei (widow of Sima Yue).

On 8 August 324, Wang Han and Qian Feng's armies arrived at the south bank of the Qinhuai river at Jiangning, where they stopped their advance after Wen Jiao burnt down the southern Zhuque Bridge (朱雀橋). The next day, while Wang and Qian were yet to complete their defenses, Emperor Ming personally led his forces south of the river and greatly routed them after several battles at Yuecheng (越城; south of present-day Nanjing, Jiangsu). Hearing news of their defeat, Wang Dun soon died in anger.

Wang Han and Qian Feng prepared another assault on the capital as they were joined by Shen Chong's forces from Wu Commandery. At the time, reinforcements under the Inspector of Yan province, Liu Xia and the Administrator of Linhuai, Su Jun had just arrived from the north to reinforce the imperial army at Jiankang. Shen and Qian wanted to take advantage of the reinforcements' fatigue, so they crossed the Qinhuai River from Zhuge Islet (竹格渚; near Nanjing), defeating Ying Zhan and Zhao Yin along the way. When they arrived at the Xuanyang Gate (宣陽門) south of Jiankang, they seized the barriers in ready for battle. However, they were flanked by Su Jun and Liu Xia from the southern dyke and were dealt a grave defeat.

Wang Han was forced to burn his camp before fleeing in the night towards Jiangning. Emperor Ming sent Wen Jiao to lead Liu Xia and the others to pursue Wang Han and Qian Feng. Eventually, Qian was caught and beheaded at Helu Islet (闔廬洲; also near Nanjing) by the Administrator of Xunyang, Zhou Guang (Note: While the Zizhi Tongjian adopted the account in Wang Dun's biography in Book of Jin, which recorded that Zhou Guang was the one who killed Qian, Hu Sanxing cited Sima Guang's Zizhi Tongjian Kaoyi when annotating vol.93 of Tongjian; Kaoyi cited Jin Chun Qiu, which recorded that Qian was killed by Dai Yuan's (戴渊) brother Dai Liang (戴良).). Wang Han, Shen Chong and the rest were also killed, putting an end to their insurrection.
