= Shen Chong (Jin dynasty) =

Chinese Jin dynasty official and rebel (died 324)

- 沈充

Grand Chief Controller (大都督)
- In office 322–324
- Monarch: Emperor Yuan of Jin/Emperor Ming of Jin

Personal details
- Born: Unknown Huzhou, Zhejiang
- Died: 324
- Children: Shen Jing
- Courtesy name: Shiju (士居)

Shen Chong (died 324), courtesy name Shiju, was a military general of the Jin dynasty (266–420). He was a chief advisor to the powerful commander, Wang Dun who aided him in his insurrection against Emperor Yuan and the Jin court. After Wang's death, he and his compatriot, Qian Feng strongly opposed surrender and continued to fight against Emperor Ming's coalition. They were defeated in the end, and Shen was killed by one of his former subordinates.

== Life ==
=== Early life and career ===
Shen Chong was a member of the Shen clan of Wuxing Commandery. He enjoyed reading military books when he was young, and his townsfolk all considered him a local hero. The Eastern Jin military commander, Wang Dun recruited him as an Army Advisor, later growing to the positions of Dragon-Prancing General and Interior Minister of Xuancheng. Shen Chong recommended his fellow native, Qian Feng, who also became a prominent advisor of Wang Dun. Both Shen and Qian knew about Wang's rebellious intent, often colluding with him in his plans. In 320, Wang petitioned to the court to have Shen Chong replace Gan Zhuo as the Inspector of Xiang province, but the court gave the position to the Prince of Qiao, Sima Zheng instead. (Note: When annotating the Zizhi Tongjian, Hu Sanxing noted that the Prince of Qiao's name should be pronounced "zheng" (氶，音拯。); he also opinioned that the Prince of Qiao's name being recorded as "Cheng" should be an error (以此观之，则前作“承”，误也。). See Hu's annotations of vols.90 and 91 of Zizhi Tongjian.)

=== Wang Dun's first insurrection ===
In 322, Wang Dun submitted a petition denouncing Emperor Yuan of Jin's partisan, Liu Wei for his crimes and raised his army against the capital, Jiankang. Shen Chong responded by gathering followers in Wuxing, and he was appointed Grand Commander and Chief Controller of military affairs in eastern Wu Commandery. The local Administrator, Kong Yu (孔愉) fled from Wuxing. Shen Chong then attacked and captured Wu Commandery, killing the Interior Minister, Zhang Mao (張茂). Around the same time, Wang Dun's forces occupied Jiankang and forced Emperor Yuan into submission. (Note: Emperor Yuan died in January 323, soon after this submission.)

With the court under his control, Wang Dun appointed Shen Chong and Qian Feng as his chief advisors. Shen Chong and his associates were all described as arrogant and cruel, often scheming and killing as they pleased. They expanded their military residences, seized the people's fields and homes, excavated the ancient tombs and plundered the marketplace. The gentry and commoners were divided, and many forewsaw that disaster would befall Wang Dun's group. Wang later appointed Shen as General of Chariots and Cavalry and Interior Minister of Wu.

Wang Dun had ambitions to seize the throne for himself, but he suddenly developed an illness in late 323. As the Interior Minister of Kuaiji, Zhou Zha (son of Zhou Chu), had long been a cause of worry for him, Qian Feng advised Wang Dun that they should strike at the Zhou clan of Yixing. In January or February 324, Wang Dun sent his Army Advisor, He Luan to Wu Commandery to deliver his instructions to Shen Chong. Shen had all of Zhou Zha's nephews in Wu executed before marching to Kuaiji with his troops, killing Zhou Zha in battle.

=== Wang Dun's second insurrection and death ===
However, Wang Dun's health continued to deteriorated, and he had to delegate command of his forces over to his elder brother, Wang Han. No longer certain of his usurpation, Wang Dun encouraged his staff to save themselves by disbanding their armies and surrendering to the court. Despite his words, Qian Feng insisted on facing the imperial court in a decisive battle, so he secretly made an agreement with Shen Chong to rebel after their commander's death.

Nonetheless, Wang Dun's treasonous plot was leaked by his general, Wen Jiao, which prompted Emperor Ming of Jin to launch a campaign against him. Wang Han suffered a heavy defeat to the imperial forces at Yuecheng (越城; south of present-day Nanjing, Jiangsu), and Wang Dun soon succumbed to his illness. Emperor Ming sent a kinsman of Shen Chong, Shen Zhen (沈楨) to convince him to defect, promising Shen Chong the lofty position of Minister of Work. Shen Chong replied, "The responsibility of the Three Excellencies is heavy for all with eyes to see, how can I accept such a position? The ancients warned against generous rewards and sweet words. Furthermore, when a true man embarks on a venture, he must see it through to the end. Who will dare tolerate me if I change my course halfway through?" He then raised 10,000 troops to march on Jiankang with Wang and others. Before departing, he told his wife and children, "If a man doesn't raise the leopard-tail banner, then he shall not return."

As their forces convened, Shen Chong's Marshal, Gu Yang (顧颺), proposed three strategies; the best was to flood Jiankang with waters of Xuanwu Lake and launch a direct naval attack, the second best was to unite with Wang Han in a joint attack, and the worst was to kill Qian Feng and surrender to the court. None of Gu Yang's plans were adopted by Shen Chong. At the time, the Inspector of Yan province, Liu Xia and the Administrator of Linhuai, Su Jun led 10,000 elite soldiers from the north to reinforce Jiankang. Shen Chong and Qian Feng surmised that the northern troops were fatigued from the march, so they planned to tak advantage by attacking them.

That night, Shen and Qian crossed the Qinhuai River from Zhuge Islet (竹格渚; near present-day Nanjing, Jiangsu), initially overcoming imperial troops under Ying Zhan and Zhao Yin. The two arrived at the Xuanyang Gate (宣陽門) south of Jiankang, where they seized the barriers in ready for battle. However, they were flanked by Su Jun and Liu Xia from the southern dyke and suffered a grave defeat. Soon, Liu Xia defeated Shen Chong again at Qingxi (青溪; in present-day Qinhuai, Nanjing). Following this defeat, Wang Han burned his camp and withdrew, while Shen Chong fled back to Wuxing. The court offered a marquisate with a fief of three thousand households as a reward for Shen Chong's capture.

During his escape, Shen Chong lost his way and mistakenly wandered into the home of his former suboridinate, Wu Ru (吳儒), who lured Shen into his compound before apprehending him. Shen pleaded with Wu to spare his life, promising to repay him for his kindness, but also warning him that if he did otherwise, Wu's entire clan will be exterminated. Wu ignored his plea and killed him, sending his head to Jiankang and thus ending the rebellion. Shen Chong's head was hung in display alongside Wang Dun's head in the southern stocks of the capital.

Shen Chong's son Shen Jing (died c.April 365) (Note: The Zizhi Tongjian recorded that Shen Jing died in the 3rd month of the 3rd year of the Xingning era of the reign of Emperor Ai of Jin, after being captured by Murong Ke after the fall of Luoyang. The month corresponds to 7 Apr to 6 May 365 in the Julian calendar.) was also wanted for execution, but his neighbours used their funds to hide him and spare him from death. Later, as Shen Chong predicted, Shen Jing had Wu Ru and his entire clan killed. (Note: As Shen Jing eventually died while serving the Jin imperial court, he must have been pardoned at some point.)
