= Shao Xu =

Jin dynasty general and vassal

- 邵續

Administrator of Leling (樂陵太守)
- In office ?–314
- Monarch: Emperor Min of Jin

Administrator of Pingyuan (平原太守)
- In office 314–?
- Monarch: Emperor Huai of Jin

Inspector of Jizhou (冀州刺史)
- In office 316–320
- Monarch: Emperor Min of Jin/ Emperor Yuan of Jin

Attendant Officer of the Household Gentlemen (從事中郎)
- In office 320–321
- Monarch: Shi Le

Personal details
- Born: Unknown Anyang County, Wei Commandery
- Died: c. 321
- Children: Shao Ai; Shao Ji; Lady Shao
- Courtesy name: Sizu (嗣祖)

Shao Xu (died c. 321), courtesy name Sizu, was a military general and warlord of the Jin dynasty (266–420). Shao Xu was an official under the You province warlord, Wang Jun but after Wang was killed in 314, he submitted to Han-Zhao. In 315, Shao Xu declared his allegiance to the Prince of Langya, Sima Rui in the south and revolted against Han. Shao Xu served as a loyal Jin vassal in Ji province where he allied himself with the Duan chieftain, Duan Pidi before he was eventually captured by Shi Le in 320. Shi Le respected Shao Xu's loyalty and initially treated him as a guest. However, Shi Le became worried that he would rebel, and in 321, had him executed along with Duan Pidi.

== Life ==
=== Career under Sima Ying, Gou Xi and Wang Jun ===
Shao Xu was born in Anyang County in Wei Commandery. He was a simple man but was ambitious and keen on reading a wide range of history texts and astronomy. He was appointed into office by the Prince of Chengdu, Sima Ying. In 303, Sima Ying waged war against his half-brother, the Prince of Changsha, Sima Ai. Shao Xu objected to his decision, stating, "I heard that brothers are like left and right hands. Today, it seems that Your Highness is facing enemies from all directions, yet intends to cut off a hand. I am confused by this." However, his advice was ignored. Shao Xu later joined Gou Xi's army, and where he was ordered to defend Qinshui County.

As conflict in the north intensifies, Shao Xu decided to quit his position and return to his hometown. There, he befriended many renegades and amassed a huge following under his wing. The You province warlord, Wang Jun acknowledged him and appointed him General of Pacification and Collection and Prefect of Leling. Shao Xu based himself in Yanci (厭次, around present-day Dezhou, Shandong), where he personally made his son, Shao Ai (邵乂) as Protector. Shao Xu would welcome refugees displaced by the ongoing war into his territory, making him rather popular among his people.

=== Rebellion against Shi Le ===
Wang Jun was defeated by the Han-Zhao general Shi Le in 314. After hearing his defeat, Shao Xu surrendered to Shi Le, and the Han general took Shao Ai to make him his own Protector as a result. Later that year, Wang Jun's Administrator of Bohai, Liu Yin (劉胤, not to be confused with the Han-Zhao prince, Liu Yin), fled to Shao Xu. During his stay with him, Liu Yin asked him to revolt against Shi Le. Soon, the Duan Xianbei chieftain in You, Duan Pidi, who had aligned himself with Sima Rui in Jiankang, also invited Shao Xu to re-pledge his allegiance to Jin.

Shao Xu thus agreed to revolt against Shi Le. However, those under him quickly reminded him of Shao Ai's safety. Shao Xu wept and said, "How can I remain a traitor just to save my son?" Those who tried to stop him were killed by Shao Xu. After Shi Le heard of Shao Xu's betrayal, he had Shao Ai killed. Shao Xu sent Liu Yin to meet with Sima Rui and declare himself a vassal of Jin. Sima Rui agreed and appointed Shao Xu as the Administrator of Pingyuan. Shi Le besieged Shao Xu but reinforcements from Duan Pidi's brother, Duan Wenyang forced him to break the siege. Shao Xu and Wenyang pursued him all the way to Anling (安陵; north of present-day Yanling County, Henan), where they captured Shi Le's officials along with more than 3,000 families before returning. They also sent cavalry to raid the northern borders of Shi Le's territory and invaded Changshan, seizing over 2,000 households.

=== As Inspector of Ji province ===
In 316, the Inspector of Ji province, Liu Yan (劉演) was besieged by Shi Le's general, Shi Hu at Linqiu (廩丘, in modern Puyang, Henan) and requested reinforcements from Shao Xu and Duan Pidi. The two sent Duan Wenyang to rescue him, but before he could arrive, the city fell but Liu Yan managed to escape to Wenyang's army. Soon after, Sima Rui appointed Shao Xu as the new Inspector of Ji province. Shao Xu's son-in-law, Liu Xia helped Shao Xu to expand his numbers by gathering people in the regions between the Ji and Yellow River. Near the end of the year, while Shi Le was away on a campaign against the Inspector of Bing province, Liu Kun, the Magistrate of Nanhe, Zhao Ling (趙領) gathered several thousand households in Guangchuan, Pingyuan, and Bohai to defect from Shi Le and surrender to Shao Xu.

In 317, Shao Xu was one of the many vassals who proposed to Sima Rui that he declare himself emperor, but the proposal was rejected. Later that year, he sent his nephew, Shao Ji (邵濟) to attack Shi Le's territory of Bohai, capturing 3,000 prisoners.

Since the beginning, Shao Xu was in conflict with the Qing province warlord, Cao Ni. In 318, he sent his nephew, Shao Cun (邵存) and Duan Wenyang to lead Duan Pidi's men in search for food at Pingyuan, but they were defeated by Shi Hu. Capitalizing on Shao Cun's defeat, Cao Ni raided and destroyed Shao Xu's military colonies while confiscating his households. Shao Xu was forced to rush to their aid and exhausted his own soldiers in the process. He then dispatched Shao Cun and Duan Wenyang to camp at Huangjingu (黃巾固; northwest of present-day Zhangqiu, Shandong) to pressure Cao Ni. Frightened, Cao Ni sought for peace.

In 319, Duan Pidi was driven out of his capital at Ji by Shi Le's forces. With nowhere left to go, he resorted to fleeing to Shao Xu and Shao welcomed him. The following year, Duan Pidi's forces were routed by his cousin Duan Mobo, who had allied himself with Shi Le. Duan Pidi pleaded to Shao Xu to help him defeat Mobo and Shao Xu agreed. The two men led their armies and defeated Pidi's cousin, forcing him to retreat.

Duan Pidi followed up his victory by trying to reclaim Ji. Upon hearing this, Shi Le knew that Shao Xu was now left vulnerable. Shi Le sent his generals Shi Hu and Kong Chang to attack Shao Xu at Yanci. Shi Hu besieged Shao Xu while Kong Chang took eleven of his camps. Shao Xu decided to personally lead his army against Shi Hu, but Shi Hu was prepared and had laid an ambush by hiding his cavalries. When the time was ripe, his cavalries appeared and attacked Shao Xu, capturing him during the battle.

Shi Hu sent Shao Xu to order his city to surrender. Instead, Shao Xu shouted to his nephew, Shao Zhu (邵竺), to remain loyal to Jin and continue resisting. Meanwhile, Duan Pidi rushed back in attempt to save Yanci. Duan Wenyang managed to break through Shi Hu army to allow him and Pidi to man the defence. Joining them were Shao Xu's son, Shao Ji (邵緝) and Xu's nephews, Shao Cun and Shao Mi. Liu Yin, who was still in the south, upon hearing that Shao Xu was under attack, begged Sima Rui to send reinforcements and save him. Sima Rui refused and instead only passed Shao Xu's office over to his son, Shao Ji.

=== Captivity and death ===
Shao Xu was sent to Shi Le's capital in Xiangguo. Shi Le respected Shao Xu's loyalty, so he freed him from captivity and appointed him Attendant Officer of the Household Gentlemen. Shi Le also issued a policy to his generals to always present him a captured official that they deemed worthy because of Shao Xu's defiance. Shao Xu continued to impress Shi Le as during his capture, Shao Xu would grow his own vegetables and sell them in the market. Because of this, Shi Le rewarded Shao Xu with clothes and grains. Often times, he would sigh and try to set Shao Xu as an example in the court.

Duan Pidi and Shao Xu's family were finally defeated and captured in 321. Despite Shi Le's respect for Shao Xu, Pidi's refusal to properly submit made Shi Le worried that the two would revolt in the future. Not long after, Shi Le ordered for Shao Xu and Pidi to be executed.
