= Consort Zhou (Cheng) =

Chinese imperial concubine of Emperor Cheng of Jin

Consort Zhou (周貴人, personal name unknown) (died 16 April 363), posthumously known as Consort Dowager Zhang (章太妃), was a Chinese imperial consort during the Jin Dynasty (266–420). She was a concubine of Emperor Cheng and her rank was guiren (贵人). She was favored by him, (Note: Lady Zhou's origins and details of her life before she joined Emperor Cheng's harem were not recorded.) and they had two sons – Sima Pi (later Emperor Ai) and Sima Yi (later Emperor Fei). Her activities during the reigns of Emperors Kang (her brother-in-law) and Emperor Mu (Emperor Kang's son) were unrecorded, but she presumably remained in the imperial harem as the concubine of a deceased emperor who had given birth to sons.

After Emperor Ai became emperor in July 361, succeeding his cousin Emperor Mu, he honored his birth mother with the title "Consort Dowager" (皇太妃) on 26 March 362, but never honored her as empress dowager, as that position was held by Emperor Mu's mother Empress Dowager Chu. She died in April 363, more than 20 years after she was widowed in July 342. She was buried on 9 August with great honors, but not with honors of an empress, as she was never one.
