= Zu Yue =

Jin dynasty minister and warlord (died 330)

- 祖約

Inspector of Yu Province (豫州刺史)
- In office 321 – 329
- Monarch: Emperor Yuan of Jin/Emperor Ming of Jin/Emperor Cheng of Jin

Personal details
- Born: after 266 Qiuxian county, Hebei
- Died: 330
- Relations: Zu Ti (brother)
- Occupation: Military general, warlord
- Courtesy name: Shishao (士少)

Zu Yue (祖約) (after 266 - March or April 330), courtesy name Shishao, was a Chinese military general and warlord of the Jin dynasty. He was the younger brother of the famed Jin general Zu Ti who marched north to reclaim lost lands from the barbarians. After Ti's death in 321, Zu Yue succeeded him but was said to have lacked his talents. In 327, dissatisfied with his treatment by the Jin court, he joined forces with Su Jun and took over the capital. However, he was defeated by loyalist forces in 329 and fled to Later Zhao, where he and his family were executed by Shi Le.

== Career under the Jin dynasty ==
Zu Yue hailed from Qiuxian county, Fanyang commandery and was the younger brother of Zu Ti, who he had a friendly relationship with. In his youth, Zu Yue received the title of "Xiaolian (孝廉; Filial and Incorrupt)" and worked as the Magistrate of Chenggao County. After the Disaster of Yongjia in July 311, he followed his brother south to join Sima Rui. There, he served a handful of offices such as the Attendant Officer of the Household Gentlemen and was said to be as equally famous as Ruan Fu (阮孚) of Chenliu.

Despite his respectful career, Zu Yue nearly landed himself in trouble due to his marital problems at home. Zu Yue had a very jealous wife who was very suspicious of him to the point that Zu Yue feared her. One night, Zu Yue was suddenly injured by someone, and he suspected that this was his wife's doing. Zu Yue begged Sima Rui to allow him to resign but was rejected, so Zu instead abandoned his post. The Minister of Justice, Liu Wei, wanted to execute him for his negligence but Sima Rui prevented him from doing so.

While Zu Ti won merits in his northern expedition, Zu Yue too benefitted back home with promotions. After Zu Ti died in 321, however, Zu Yue was chosen to take over his army as General Who Pacifies The West and Inspector of Yuzhou. His half-brother, Zu Na (祖納) warned Sima Rui that giving his brother that much power would lead to rebellion, but Na was ignored as he was noted to be notoriously jealous of Yue. Zu Yue found his new position difficult to hold, as his lack of ability to impose discipline and poor relations with his brother's generals made him very unpopular among his men. Shortly after Zu Yue's appointment, Later Zhao forces quickly retook lands that they had lost to Zu Ti. Zu Yue failed to hold out and lost Xiangcheng, Chengfu (城父, in present-day Bozhou, Anhui) and Chenliu as a result.

In 324, Zu Yue joined the loyalist side during Wang Dun's second insurrection against Jin after he was summoned to the capital by Emperor Ming. Zu Yue drove out Wang's Administrator of Huainan Ren Tai (任台) at Shouyang (壽陽, in present-day Lu'an, Anhui).

After the death of Emperor Ming the following year, his brother-in-law Yu Liang, became the regent for his nephew, Emperor Cheng of Jin. Zu Yue saw himself as an independent warlord and wished to exercise his own authority over his holdings. He had hope that the new government would give him the privilege to hand out offices to his subordinates, much like his contemporaries, but this did not happen. He soon sent multiple petitions demanding for it, but they were either rejected or ignored. Even worse, when an imperial edict promoting ministers was declared, he, along with Tao Kan, were left out from the edict, and all this caused Zu Yue to suspect that Yu Liang was purposefully snubbing him.

In 326, Zu Yue was attacked by Later Zhao forces under Shi Cong (石聰) at Shouchun. Zu sent edicts to Jiankang demanding for help but none came. The court only considered action when Shi Cong attacked Junqiu (浚遒, in present-day Feidong County, Anhui) and Fuling (阜陵; in present-day Quanjiao County, Anhui). However, before reinforcements could be sent, the warlord, Su Jun, sent his general Han Huang first and repelled Shi Cong. Zu Yue's relationship with the court deteriorated even further when he heard of the court's plan to make a defensive dyke. The dyke would cut him off from the capital, leaving him isolated in the face of a future invasion.

== Su Jun's Rebellion ==
In c.December 327, Su Jun rebelled against the Jin dynasty. Su Jun knew of Zu Yue's grudge with Yu Liang and the government, so he was offered to join forces. Zu Yue was delighted, and sent nephew Zu Huan and brother-in-law Xu Liu to aid Su Jun in capturing Jiankang. There were attempts to discourage Zu Yue from joining Su Jun by Huan Xuan (桓宣) and Zu Ti's widow, but Zu Yue refused to listen. When Su Jun took over the capital in 328, Su Jun appointed Zu Yue Palace Attendant, Grand Commandant, and Prefect of the Masters of Writing.

While the rebellion raged on in the south, Later Zhao attacked Zu Yue at Huaishang. One of Zu Yue's general, Chen Guang (陳光), betrayed and attacked him. Zu Yue's Attendant and also his look-alike, Yan Tu (閻禿), pretended to be his superior while the real Zu Yue secretly escaped the city in the night.

The Jin general, Wen Jiao, issued a call to arms against Su Jun and Zu Yue. Many loyalists rose up against them and gathered around the capital's region. While Wen Jiao was at the Qiezi river mouth (茄子浦, in present-day Nanjing, Jiangsu), his subordinate Mao Bao went against his orders and successfully attacked a shipment of rice that Su Jun was sending to Zu Yue, leaving Zu and his men starving without food. Later, Zu Yue sent his generals Zu Huan (祖渙) and Huan Fu (桓撫) to attack Penkou (湓口, in present-day Jiujiang, Jiangxi). They managed to defeat Mao Bao at first, but he then returned to drive them off. Mao Bao proceeded to attack and capture Zu Yue's camps in Hefei.

With his deteriorating relationship with his staff and the mounting defeats, Zu Yue's generals plotted with Later Zhao to kill him. Shi Cong and Shi Kan (石堪) attacked Zu Yue at Shouchun and his forces scattered, causing him to flee to Liyang.

Su Jun was killed in battle in late 328 and was succeeded by his brother Su Yi (蘇逸). The situation for Zu Yue continued to worsen as the loyalist Zhao Yin (趙胤) attacked his base the next year. While his general Gan Miao (甘苗) fought Zhao Yin, Zu Yue secretly fled to Later Zhao with his families and followers. Gan Miao later surrender to Zhao Yin, thus ending Zu Yue's part in the rebellion. Su Yi and the rest of the rebels were destroyed later that year.

== Flight to Later Zhao and death ==
Although Zu Yue was under Zhao's protection, its emperor, Shi Le secretly despised him. His advisor Cheng Xia and general Yao Yizhong shared his sentiment and advised him to kill Zu Yue before he could rebel, citing the precedent of Liu Bang killing Ding Gong despite Ding having once saved Liu's life. Shi Le thus hosted a banquet for Zu Yue and his followers with the intention of trapping them there. At the banquet, Zu Yue soon realized that he had fallen for Shi Le's ruse and drank heavily. Zu Yue and his followers were then arrested and brought to the marketplace to be executed. Before he died, Zu Yue was said to have cried while holding his grandsons. The men were executed while the women were distributed among the tribes in Zhao. Only his nephew, Zu Xian (祖羡; original name Zu Daozhong (祖道重)), survived due to the help of Zu Ti's slave-turned-Later Zhao general Wang An (王安).
