= Wang Dao =

Chinese official and Jin Dynasty regent (276-339)

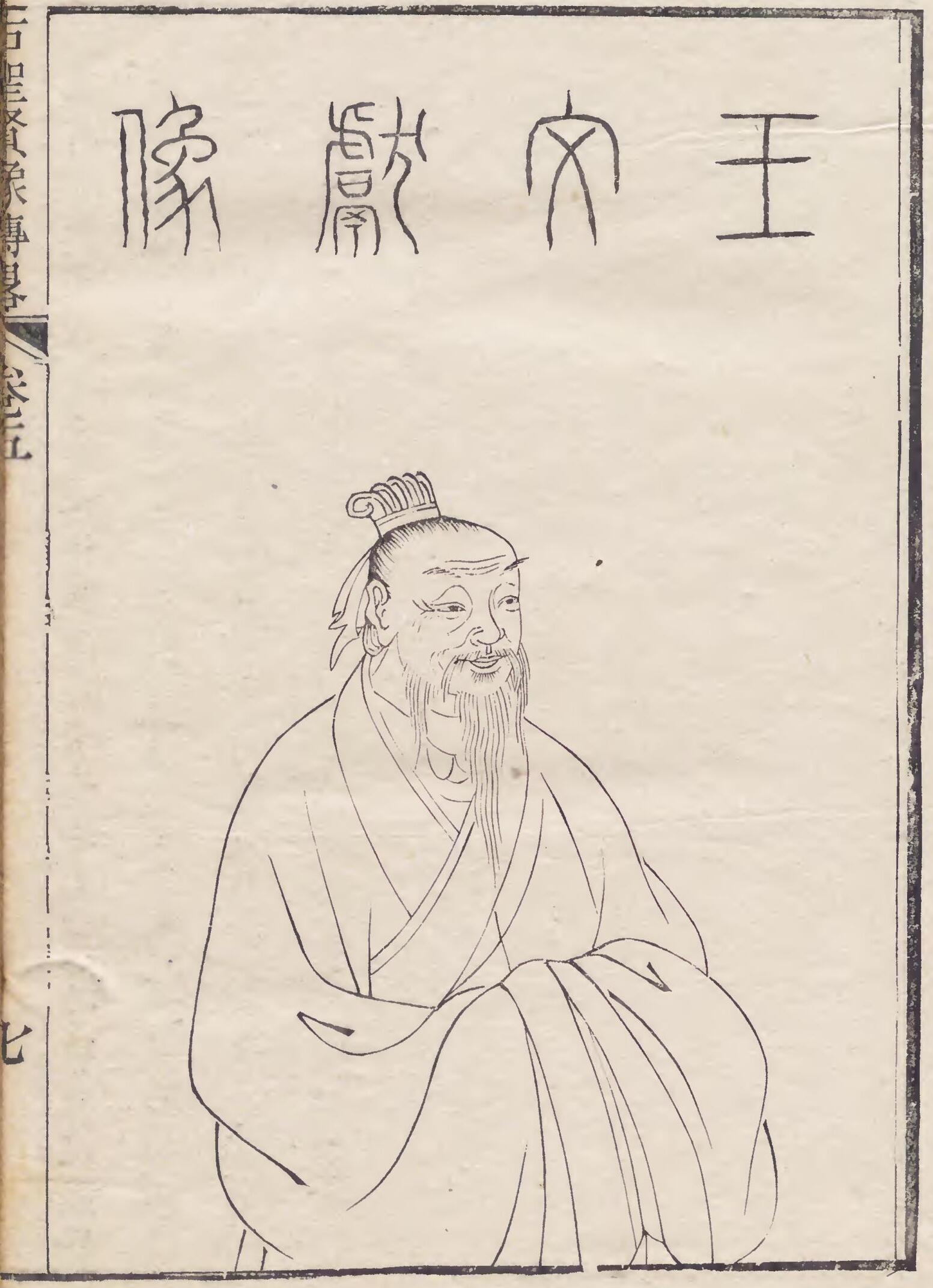
- Born: 276
- Died: 339 (aged 62–63)
- Spouse: Lady Cao Shu
Names
- Family name: Wang (王); Given name: Dao (導); Courtesy name: Maohong (茂弘) Titles Viscount of Jiqiu (即丘子); Marquis of Wugang (武岡侯); Duke of Shixing (始興郡公)
Posthumous name
- Wenxian (文獻)
- Father: Wang Cai (王裁)
- Occupation: Politician

Wang Dao (Chinese: 王導; Wade–Giles: Wang Tao; 276 (Note: According to Wang Dao's biography in Book of Jin, he was 64 (by East Asian reckoning) when he died.. Thus by calculation, his birth year should be 276.) – 7 September 339 (Note: According to Emperor Cheng's biography in Book of Jin, Wang Dao died on the gengshen day of the 7th month of the 5th year of the Xiankang era of his reign. This corresponds to 7 Sep 339 in the Julian calendar.)), courtesy name Maohong (茂弘), formally Duke Wenxian of Shixing (始興文獻公), was a Chinese politician during the Jin dynasty who played an important role in the administrations of Emperor Yuan, Emperor Ming, and Emperor Cheng, including as Emperor Cheng's regent. In these capacities, he served as a crucial governing figure of the Eastern Jin Dynasty during its first decades, as well as the leading member of the prominent Wang clan of Langya, especially after the death of his rebellious cousin Wang Dun. His governance style was to be lenient with the laws, and he handed out few punishments—which stabilized the Jin regime greatly, but which also led to extensive, if moderate, corruption and incompetence in the Jin regime, making it difficult for Jin armies to recapture northern China.

Wang's line, during the subsequent Southern Dynasties, was known as one of the two most honored lines of nobles—the other being Xie An's line—and in the people's minds no less honored than imperial households.

== Early career ==
Wang Dao's grandfather Wang Lan (王覽) and father Wang Cai (王裁) were mid-level Jin Dynasty officials, and he inherited from them the title Viscount of Jiqiu. He was the grandnephew of Wang Xiang. When he was young, during the late reign of Emperor Hui, he served on the staff of Sima Yue the Prince of Donghai. During that time, he befriended Sima Rui the Prince of Langye. It was at Wang's suggestion that Sima Rui slipped out of the capital Luoyang and stayed safe during most of the War of the Eight Princes in his Principality of Langye. When Sima Yue later became regent for Emperor Huai and commissioned Sima Rui to be the military commander for the area southeast of the Yangtze River, posted to Jianye (建業, modern Nanjing, Jiangsu), Wang volunteered to serve on Sima Rui's staff, and he became Sima Rui's chief advisor.

As Sima Rui lacked fame, after he arrived in Jianye, few of the powerful local gentlemen would come visit and support him. Under Wang Dao's counsel, Sima Rui personally visited He Xun (賀循) and Gu Rong (顧榮) and invited them to serve in his administration. He and Gu were well regarded by the local population, which eventually began to trust Sima Rui's leadership. Wang Dao and his cousin, the general Wang Dun, served in key roles, and it was said at the time that the domain was ruled equally by the Simas and the Wangs. Around the time that Luoyang fell to Han-Zhao and Emperor Huai was captured (July 311), large numbers of refugees fled to Sima Rui's domain. Wang assisted Sima Rui in settling the refugees and strengthening his rule. After Emperor Min was also captured by Han, Wang was one of the officials who urged Sima Rui to take the throne, and he did, initially claiming the title "Prince of Jin" in 317 and then emperor in 318 after Emperor Min was executed by Han.

== During Emperor Yuan's reign ==
Initially, Wang Dao continued to serve as chief advisor for Emperor Yuan, but after Emperor Yuan began to have a falling out with Wang Dao's powerful cousin Wang Dun over Wang Dun's domination of the western provinces, he also began to distance himself from Wang Dao. When Wang Dun finally rebelled in 322 and attacked the capital Jiankang (renamed from Jianye because of naming taboo of Emperor Min's name), Wang Dao feared that his clan would be slaughtered, and he and his clan members went to the palace door to beg for their lives. Initially, Emperor Yuan would not see them. When Wang Dao asked Zhou Yi, an official who had once compared him to Guan Zhong, to intercede on his behalf, Zhou did and persuaded Emperor Yuan that Wang Dao was not involved in Wang Dun's rebellion—but in order to not make Wang Dao grateful for him, he chose not to respond to Wang Dao but instead cursed Wang Dun when Wang Dao begged him, causing Wang Dao to believe that he, like Liu Wei and Diao Xie (刁協), wanted to exterminate the Wang clan. Wang Dao did not find out what Zhou had done for him. Later, after Wang Dun successfully captured Jiankang, forcing Emperor Yuan to submit to him, he asked Wang Dao what he thought of Zhou, and Wang Dao said nothing—so Wang Dun executed Zhou. Later, when Wang found out from imperial archives the petitions that Zhou had submitted on his behalf, he mourned and gave a famous quote, which later became a Chinese idiom:

Although I did not kill Boren (Note: Zhou Yi's courtesy name)(伯仁), Boren died because of me!

Wang Dao also noticed that Emperor Yuan's court initially had no court historian. As such, he recommended Gan Bao for the position, which was accepted by Emperor Yuan.

Wang Dao continued to serve Emperor Yuan faithfully until Emperor Yuan's death in January 323.

== During Emperor Ming's reign ==
Emperor Yuan was succeeded by his son and crown prince Sima Shao (Emperor Ming), who trusted Wang Dao's faithfulness and made him his prime minister. Later, when Emperor Ming faced Wang Dun's forces in 324, Wang Dao contributed greatly to defeating Wang Dun's force by falsely claiming that Wang Dun was dead—a claim that the army believed because he was Wang Dun's cousin and which gave the army high morale. Before Emperor Ming's death in October 325, he made Wang Dao one of the officials he entrusted his four-year-old son Sima Yan with.

== During Emperor Cheng's reign ==
After Sima Yan took the throne (as Emperor Cheng), several officials who were named in Emperor Ming's will were put in charge—that included Wang Dao, Sima Yang (司馬羕) the Prince of Xiyang, Bian Kun (卞壼), Xi Jian, Yu Liang, Lu Ye (陸瞱), and Wen Jiao. However, quickly, Yu Liang, as the brother of Emperor Cheng's mother Empress Dowager Yu, became effectively the most powerful among them, as Empress Dowager Yu became regent. Wang's role in government continued to be important, however.

In 327, the ambitious general Su Jun, offended by Yu Liang's attempt to strip him of his military command, rebelled along with Zu Yue, and Su's forces quickly captured Jiankang in early 328, taking Empress Dowager Yu and Emperor Cheng hostage and forcing Yu to flee. Wang, who remained in Jiankang, continued to be respected by Su, but secretly ordered the provincial forces to resist Su. As Tao Kan and Wen gathered their forces and marched against Su's, Wang persuaded Su's general Lu Yong (路永) to defect to Tao and Wen, and Wang and Lu fled Jiankang together, joining Tao and Wen's forces. Later that year, Su was killed in battle, and in early 329, his remaining forces were defeated. As Empress Dowager Yu died during Su's rebellion, most officials requested Wen stay in Jiankang to serve as regent, but Wen, believing that Emperor Ming intended for Wang to be regent, declined and gave the post to Wang.

For the next few years, Wang was largely in control of the government, but Yu Liang, who had then exiled himself from the capital as the governor of Jing Province (荊州, modern Hubei and Hunan), continued to be influential despite his distance from the capital. In 338, Yu, unhappy that, in his view, Wang was not adequately preparing Emperor Cheng to rule, tried to persuade Xi Jian to jointly act with him to depose Wang, but Xi refused. (Note: Vol.96 of Zizhi Tongjian recorded that Wang himself heard of Yu's plot and wrote to the latter, urging him to "do the right thing" (宜善事之).) Wang stayed regent until his death in 339, and he was buried with great honors, including some ceremonies that were ordinarily reserved for emperors. He was succeeded by his assistant He Chong (何充) and Yu Liang's younger brother Yu Bing (庾冰).

== Anecdotes ==
When Huan Yi (father of Huan Wen) first reached Sima Rui's domain from the north, he saw the weak Eastern Jin court and expressed his despair to Zhou Yi. However, he then met Wang Dao and the pair talked about current affairs. When Huan next met Zhou, he told the latter, "I have met Guan Yiwu; I am no longer worried."

Once, both Wang Dao and Wang Dun attended a banquet; the host (Note: The identity of the host differs according to the source. The Shishuo Xinyu indicated that the host was Shi Chong, while Wang Dun's biography in Jin Shu attributed the cruel act to Wang Su's son (and Wang Yuanji's brother) Wang Kai.) was known to execute any female servant who failed to persuade her assigned guest to empty his cup. When Wang Dao was being served, he forced himself to drink, even though he was not good with alcohol. In contrast, Wang Dun refused to drink.
