= Emperor Ming of Jin =

Emperor of the Jin dynasty from 323 to 325

Emperor Ming of Jin 晉明帝
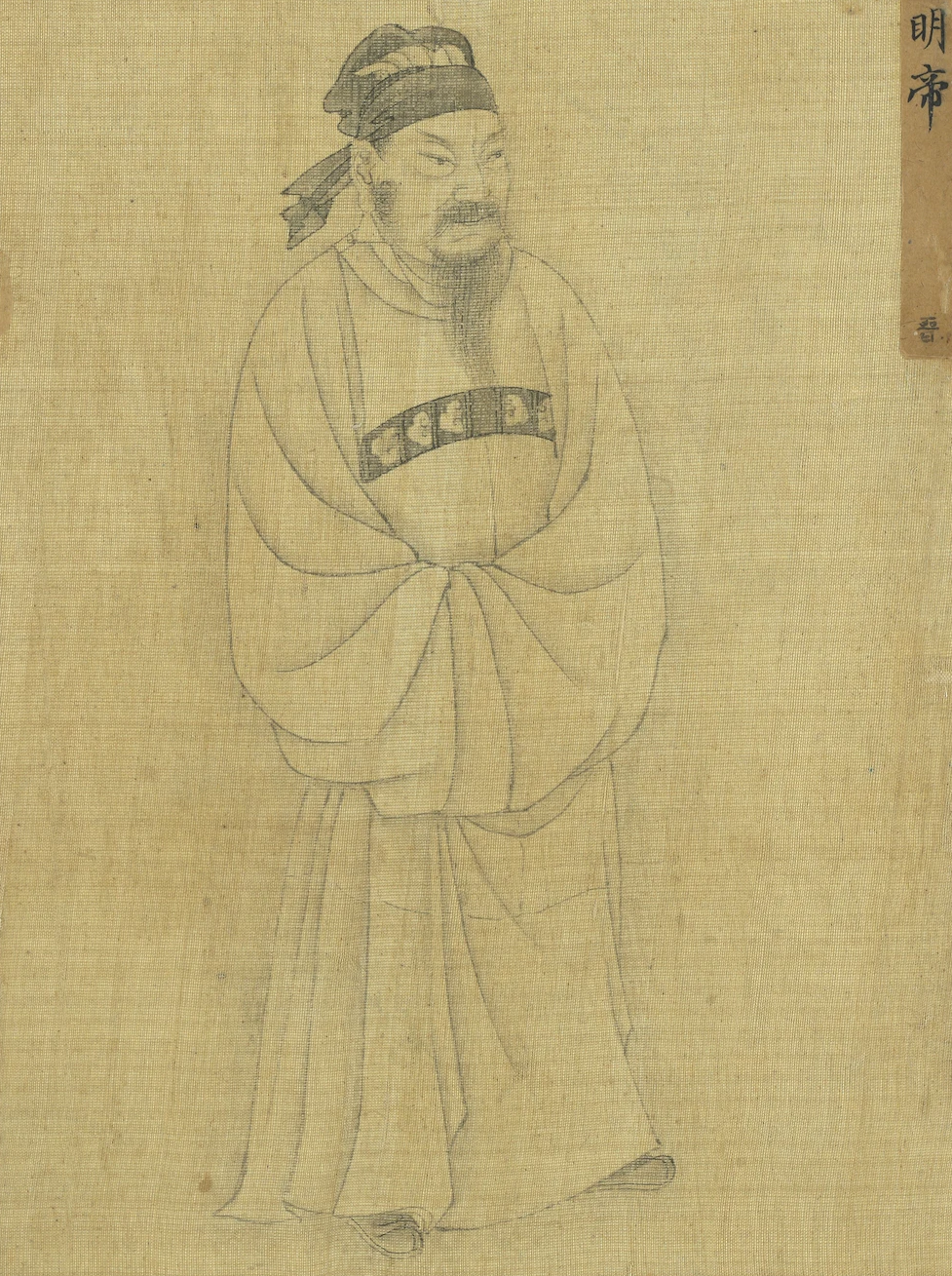

Second Emperor of Eastern Jin Dynasty
- Reign: 4 January 323 – 18 October 325
- Predecessor: Emperor Yuan
- Successor: Emperor Cheng
- Born: 299
- Died: 18 October 325 (aged 26); Jiankang, Eastern Jin
- Burial: Wuping Mausoleum (武平陵), Nanjing, Jiangsu
- Consorts: Empress Mingmu Yu Wenjun
- Issue: Emperor Cheng; Emperor Kang; Princess Nankang; Princess Luling; Princess Nandao
Full name
- Family name: Sima; Given name: Shao (紹, shaò)
Era dates
- Taining (太寧): 323 – 325
Posthumous name
- Emperor Míng 明皇帝 (lit. "understanding")
Temple name
- Suzu (肅祖, sùzǔ)
- House: House of Sima
- Dynasty: Eastern Jin
- Father: Emperor Yuan of Jin
- Mother: Lady Xun

Emperor Ming of Jin (simplified Chinese: 晋明帝; traditional Chinese: 晉明帝; pinyin: Jìn Míng Dì; Wade–Giles: Chin Ming-ti; 299 – 18 October 325, (Note: According to Sima Shao's biography in Book of Jin, he died aged 27 (by East Asian reckoning) on the wuzi day in the leap month of the 3rd year of the Taining era of his reign. This corresponds to 18 Oct 325 in the Julian calendar. Vol.93 of Zizhi Tongjian recorded the same date of death, and Hu Sanxing's annotation of the volume also indicated that Emperor Ming died at the age of 27 (by East Asian reckoning).) personal name Sima Shao (司馬紹), courtesy name Daoji (道畿), was an emperor of the Eastern Jin dynasty of China. During his brief reign (323–325), he led the weakened Jin out of domination by the warlord Wang Dun, but at his early death, the empire was left to his young son Emperor Cheng, and the fragile balance of power that he created was soon broken, leading to the Su Jun Disturbance and weakening the Jin state even further. Subsequent Eastern Jin emperors until Emperor Fei were his descendants, being either his sons (Emperor Cheng, Emperor Kang) or grandsons (Emperor Mu, Emperor Ai and Emperor Fei).

== Early life ==
Sima Shao was born in 299, as the oldest son of his father Sima Rui, then the Prince of Langya, by his lowly-born concubine Lady Xun, who then in 300 gave birth to another son, Sima Pou (司馬裒). Sima Rui's wife, Princess Yu Mengmu (虞孟母), who was herself childless, became very jealous of Lady Xun and mistreated her greatly. Lady Xun, not able to bear the abuse, complained bitterly, and was thrown out of the household. Sima Shao was therefore raised by Princess Yu, with whom he apparently had a cordial relationship. During his youth, he was considered intelligent and quick-thinking, although eventually his brother Sima Pou became more favored by their father.

While Sima Rui served as Left Prime Minister under Emperor Min, the teenage Sima Shao was put in charge of defending Guangling. After Sima Rui declared himself the Prince of Jin on 6 April 317, following Emperor Min's capture by Han-Zhao on 11 December 316, he initially wanted to make Sima Pou his crown prince, but after Wang Dao pointed out that traditionally the older son should succeed him, he created Sima Shao crown prince on 1 May of the same year. Sima Shao remained in that status after his father declared himself emperor (as Emperor Yuan) in April 318, after Han-Zhao executed Emperor Min; by this time, his brother Sima Pou had died.

== As crown prince ==
While crown prince, Sima Shao was known for seeking out talented men and befriending them, treating them as friends and not as subordinates. These included Wang Dao, Yu Liang (whose sister Yu Wenjun he married), Wen Jiao, Huan Yi (桓彝; father of Huan Wen), and Ruan Fang (阮放). He was also known for his filial piety and his literary studies. He later also added martial arts to his studies, and he often visited troops to encourage them.

When Wang Dun rebelled against Emperor Yuan in 322, the capital Jiankang fell easily to Wang. Upon hearing news that Wang had breached Jiankang's defenses, Crown Prince Shao was going to himself make a last stand, but Wen stopped him by cutting off the ropes off his horse. When Wang subsequently forced Emperor Yuan into submission, he considered deposing Crown Prince Shao by falsely accusing Crown Prince Shao of being disobedient to Emperor Yuan. However, Wen prevented this by publicly praising Crown Prince Shao of filial piety, making Wang's putative accusations not credible.

Early in January 323, Emperor Yuan died in distress after his defeat by Wang. Crown Prince Shao succeeded to the throne as Emperor Ming.

== Reign ==
One of the first things that Emperor Ming did was locating his birth mother Lady Xun, putting her in a mansion, and creating her the Lady of Jian'an. However, perhaps out of respect for his deceased stepmother Princess Yu Mengmu, (Note: Lady Yu had died in 312, but was posthumously honored as an empress by Emperor Yuan in October 320; her eventual posthumous name was "Empress Yuanjing".) he never gave her an empress dowager title—and Emperor Ming honored Princess Yu's family as appropriately he would a mother's family—and he was particularly close to Princess Yu's brother Yu Yin (虞胤). A few months after he took the throne, Lady Xun moved into the palace. Emperor Ming also created his wife, Crown Princess Yu, empress.

Wang Dun did not think much of the new emperor, and he plotted usurping the throne. In summer 323, he had Emperor Ming summon him to the capital, but actually did not go to the capital, but only moved his headquarters from Wuchang (武昌, in modern Ezhou, Hubei) to Gushu (姑孰, in modern Ma'anshan, Anhui), closer to the capital, and also taking over the governorship of the capital province. When Emperor Ming tried to commission the official Xi Jian as the military commander at Hefei, positionally behind Wang, Wang resisted, and Emperor Ming was forced to recall Xi.

In 324, Wang Dun grew ill, and became resolved to overthrow Jin so that his adopted son, Wang Ying (王應), could be emperor. (Note: This was after his initial two inclinations—ordering that his troops be disbanded after his death, or having Wang Ying continue to control his troops but pledging allegiance to Emperor Ming—were rejected by his strategists.) He also made Wen Jiao, by that point a trusted assistant, the mayor of Jiankang, to keep an eye on the emperor—forgetting that Wen was loyal to Emperor Ming. Upon arrival in Jiankang, Wen informed Emperor Ming of Wang's plans, as well as his illness. Wang Dao, also loyal to Emperor Ming, then falsely declared to the imperial forces that Wang Dun had died, further increasing their morale, and Emperor Ming reinforced his troops by summoning battle-tested soldiers from the northern borders with Later Zhao back to the capital. (Note: When the generals in command of these forces, Su Jun and Liu Xia, arrived at Jiankang, even though it was dark in the night, Emperor Ming went to personally visit the troops, greatly enhancing their morale.) Wang Dun then sent his forces east to Jiankang, headed by his brother Wang Han (王含, Wang Ying's biological father) and Qian Feng, but could not decisively defeat the imperial troops. The imperial troops then attacked by, defeating Wang Han. Wang Dun, upon hearing initial news of defeat, died. The imperial forces then defeated Wang Han's troops more completely, forcing Wang Han and Wang Ying to flee, but they were captured by Wang Dun's brother Wang Shu (王舒), who executed them by drowning to show his loyalty.

In 325, Emperor Ming posthumously awarded officials who had died at Wang Dun's hands throughout the years with titles and honors. He also put the general Tao Kan, known for his military and governing capabilities, in charge of most of Wang Dun's former domain, including the key Jing Province (荊州, modern Hubei).

In fall 325, Emperor Ming grew ill. During this final illness, Sima Zong (Note: son of Sima Liang and brother of Sima Yang) and Yu Yin held the keys to the palace where Emperor Ming was resting. One night, Yu Liang decided to seek an audience with the emperor; he then went to Sima Zong and asked for the keys to the palace gates. Sima refused, incurring Yu's wrath. At a later date, Yu pushed open the door to Emperor Ming's chambers. In tears, Yu claimed that Sima Yang and Sima Zong were plotting to dismiss court officials. Yu then requested that the emperor make him regent and dismiss Sima Zong, Sima Yang and Yu Yin; Emperor Ming refused. Eventually, Emperor Ming entrusted his four-year-old son, Crown Prince Yan, to a group of high-level officials, including Sima Yang (司馬羕) the Prince of Xiyang, Wang Dao, Bian Kun (卞壼), Xi Jian, Yu Liang, Lu Ye (陸瞱), (Note: grandson of Lu Mao) and Wen Jiao, perhaps intending that they lead by group with a balance of power. He died soon thereafter—only 26 years old. The balance of power that he left was soon broken, however, as Empress Dowager Yu became the regent, and her brother Yu Liang became the most powerful of the officials, eventually offending Su Jun and Zu Yue into a rebellion that damaged Jin for years.

== Anecdotes ==
When Emperor Ming was a child, he was sitting on his father Emperor Yuan's knee where someone from Chang'an came to seek an audience; Emperor Yuan cried as he asked about the situation at Luoyang. The young Sima Shao then asked his father why he was crying; Emperor Yuan then told Shao his intent to seek refuge in the Jiangdong region. Emperor Yuan then asked his son, "In your opinion, which is further away: Chang'an or the sun?" Shao replied, "The sun. This is apparent as no one has ever came to us from where the sun is." Emperor Yuan was impressed by his reply. The next day, during a session with court officials, Emperor Yuan told those present Shao's reply from the day before, and then asked Shao the same question again. However, this time, Shao replied, "The sun is closer." Emperor Yuan went pale and asked, "Why was your answer different from yesterday's?" Shao replied, "Today, when I lift my head, I can see the sun. But, I cannot see Chang'an." (Note: This anecdote was also included in Emperor Ming's biography in the Tang-era Book of Jin, albeit with several changes.)

== Era name ==
- Taining (太寧, tài níng): 22 April 323 – 15 April 326

== Family ==
- Empress Mingmu, of the Yu clan of Yingchuan (明穆皇后 潁川庾氏; 297–328), personal name Wenjun (文君)
  - Princess Xuan of Nankang (南康宣公主), personal name Xingnan (興男)
    - Married Huan Wen of Qiao, Duke Xuanwu of Nan Commandery (南郡宣武公; 312–373)
  - Sima Yan, Emperor Cheng (成皇帝 司馬衍; 321–342), first son
  - Sima Yue, Emperor Kang (康皇帝 司馬嶽; 322–344), second son
- Unknown
  - Princess Luling (廬陵公主; d. 357), personal name Nandi (南弟)
    - Married Liu Tan of Pei (沛國 刘惔)
  - Princess Nandao (南悼公主)
    - Married Yang Bi of Taishan (泰山 羊賁)

== Notes ==
Emperor Ming of Jin House of Sima Born: 299 Died: 18 October 325
Regnal titles
Preceded by Emperor Yuan of Jin	Emperor of China; Eastern Jin; 323–326	Succeeded by Emperor Cheng of Jin
