= Du Lingyang =

Du Lingyang 杜陵陽

Empress consort of the Eastern Jin dynasty
- Tenure: 17 March 336 – 7 April 341
- Predecessor: Empress Yu Wenjun
- Successor: Empress Chu Suanzi
- Born: 321
- Died: 7 April 341 (aged 19–20); Jiankang, Eastern Jin
- Spouse: Emperor Cheng of Jin
Posthumous name
- Empress Chenggong (成恭皇后)
- Father: Du Yi
- Mother: Lady Pei Mu

Du Lingyang (Chinese: 杜陵陽; 321 – 7 April 341), formally Empress Chenggong (成恭皇后) was an empress of the Jin dynasty (266–420) of China. Her husband was Emperor Cheng of Jin.

== Naming ==
Some historians believe that her name was simply Du Ling, and that imperial archivists mistakenly attached the character "yang" to her name later. They point out that while the name of a county with the character "ling" in its name was changed pursuant to naming taboo, many names of places with "yang" in their names were not changed. However, there can be other explanations for this.

== Life ==
Du Lingyang was a daughter of Du Yi (杜乂), a mid-level official and the hereditary Marquis of Dangyang, a grandson of the general Du Yu, who contributed much to Emperor Wu of Jin's conquest of Eastern Wu. Du Yi died early, and Du Lingyang, who did not have any brothers, was raised by her mother Lady Pei Mu (裴穆). (Note: According to Lady Du's biography, Pei Mu's father was Pei Xia (裴遐) and her grandfathers were Pei Chuo (裴绰) and Wang Yifu (Wang Yan). Pei Xia's cousins include Princess Pei, wife of Sima Yue (daughter of Pei Kang) and Pei Xian (son of Pei Kai). Pei Mu was still alive in 374 (2nd year of the Ningkang era of the reign of Emperor Xiaowu of Jin), where she was made xianjun of Guangde.)

Du Lingyang was famed for her beauty and virtues, and Emperor Cheng made her his empress on 17 March 336, when both of them were 15. He apparently favored her greatly, but she was childless. She died in April 341, 15 months before his death.

After her death, her name was tabooed (meaning that other important people or places should not share her name) to honour her, and thus the name of the county Lingyang (headquarter in modern Southern Lingyang town, Qingyang, Anhui) was changed to Guangyang. This is believed to be the first instance of a geographical name being changed due to a taboo of the name of an empress.

== Notes ==
Chinese royalty
Preceded by Empress Yu Wenjun	Empress of Jin Dynasty (266–420); 336–341	Succeeded by Empress Chu Suanzi
