= Hu Sanxing =

Chinese historian (1230 – 1302)

Hu Sanxing (Chinese: 胡三省; pinyin: Hú Sānxǐng; 1230–1302), born Hu Mansun (胡滿孫), courtesy names Shenzhi (身之), Meijian (梅澗), and Jingcan (景參), was a Chinese historian and commentator who lived during the late Song dynasty and early Yuan dynasty.

Hu was born in Ninghai (current Ninghai County of Ningbo, Zhejiang Province). He was a mid-level official under the prime minister Jia Sidao during the 1250s. After the fall of Song, he hid himself in the country, and he spent the next few years, until the end of his life, writing his influential corrections and commentaries for the Zizhi Tongjian, which included Sima Guang's Zizhi Tongjian Kaoyi. Hu's commentaries are considered highly valuable for readers of the work.
