= Emperor Cheng of Jin =

Emperor of Eastern Jin from 325 to 342

Emperor Cheng of Jin 晉成帝

3rd Emperor of Eastern Jin Dynasty
- Reign: 19 October 325 – 26 July 342
- Predecessor: Emperor Ming
- Successor: Emperor Kang
- Regent: Yu Wenjun; Yu Liang
- Born: December 321 or January 322
- Died: 26 July 342 (aged 21); Jiankang, Eastern Jin
- Burial: Xingping Mausoleum (興平陵), Nanjing, Jiangsu
- Spouse: Du Lingyang; Consort Zhou
- Issue: Emperor Ai; Emperor Fei
Full name
- Family name: Sīmǎ (司馬); Given name: Yan (衍)
Era dates
- Xianhe (咸和): 326 – 334; Xiankang (咸康): 335 – 342
Posthumous name
- Emperor Chéng 成皇帝 (lit. "successful")
Temple name
- Xianzong (顯宗)
- House: House of Sima
- Dynasty: Eastern Jin
- Father: Emperor Ming
- Mother: Yu Wenjun

Emperor Cheng of Jin (Chinese: 晉成帝; pinyin: Jìn Chéng Dì; Wade–Giles: Chin Ch'eng-ti; December 321 or January 322 (Note: The Zizhi Tongjian recorded that Emperor Cheng was born in the 11th month of the 4th year of the Taixing era of his grandfather Sima Rui's reign. This corresponds to 6 Dec 321 to 4 Jan 322 in the proleptic Gregorian calendar.) – 26 July 342 (Note: According to Emperor Cheng's biography in Book of Jin, he died aged 22 (by East Asian reckoning) on the guisi day of the 6th month of the 8th year of the Xiankang era of his reign. This corresponds to 26 July 342 in the proleptic Gregorian calendar. Vol.97 of Zizhi Tongjian recorded the same death date.)), personal name Sima Yan (司馬衍), courtesy name Shigen (世根), was an emperor of the Chinese Eastern Jin dynasty. He was the eldest son of Emperor Ming and became the crown prince on 1 April 325. During his reign, the administration was largely dominated by a succession of regents—initially his uncle Yu Liang, then Wang Dao, then the joint administration of his uncles He Chong (Note: Per He Chong's biography in Jin Shu, his wife is a younger sister of Yu Wenjun.) and Yu Bing. He became emperor at age four, and soon after his accession to the throne, the disastrous rebellion of Su Jun weakened Jin forces for decades.

== Family background ==
Sima Yan was born as the oldest son of Emperor Ming of Jin, who was crown prince at that time, by his wife Crown Princess Yu Wenjun, in December 321 or January 322. After Emperor Ming took the throne in January 323 following the death of his father Emperor Yuan, he created Crown Princess Yu empress, but did not immediately create Prince Yan crown prince, until 325.

In fall 325, Emperor Ming grew ill. He entrusted the four-year-old Crown Prince Yan to a group of high-level officials, including Sima Yang (司馬羕) the Prince of Xiyang, Wang Dao, Bian Kun (卞壼), Xi Jian, Lu Ye (陸瞱), (Note: grandson of Lu Mao) Wen Jiao, and Empress Yu's brother Yu Liang, perhaps intending that they lead by group with a balance of power. He died soon thereafter. Crown Prince Yan took the throne as Emperor Cheng.

== Reign ==
Jin Chengdi (晉成帝)
Family name:	Sima (司馬; sī mǎ)
Given name:	Yan (衍, yān)
Temple name:	Xianzong (顯宗, xiàn zōng)
Posthumous name:	Cheng (成, chéng), literary meaning: "successful"

=== Yu Liang's regency ===
Initially, the officials were in charge together, but as Empress Dowager Yu became regent, Yu Liang became effectively the most powerful official in the administration. He changed from the lenient policies of Wang (who was prime minister during Emperor Ming's reign) to stricter applications of laws and regulations, which offended the officials accustomed to Wang's lenience. He also became apprehensive of the generals Tao Kan and Zu Yue—neither of whom was mentioned in the list of honors and promotions announced by Emperor Ming's will and believed that Yu had erased their names from the will—and Su Jun, who had allowed many criminals to join his army. In 326, he alienated public opinion by falsely accusing Sima Yang's brother Sima Zong (司馬宗) the Prince of Nandun of treason and killing him and deposing Sima Yang.

=== The Su Jun Disturbance ===
In 327, apprehensive of Su, Yu decided to try to strip his military command by promoting him to the minister of agriculture—a position that did not involve commanding troops. After initially hesitating, Su eventually refused and formed an alliance with Zu against Yu; the pair declared their rebellion in c.December. Upon hearing this, Wen, whom Yu had made the governor of Jiang Province (江州, modern Jiangxi) to defend against Tao, the governor of Jing Province (modern Hubei), wanted to quickly move to help defend the capital Jiankang, as did the local forces to the east of the capital, but Yu declined all help, wanting Wen to remain in position against Tao and believing that he can defeat Su easily. Fearful that Yu would be defeated by Su, Wen headed toward the capital anyway. Before Wen arrived, Su was able to capture the capital in early 328 and take Emperor Cheng and Empress Dowager Yu hostage. Bian died in the battle, and Yu Liang and his brothers Yu Shuyu, Yu Tiao and Yu Yi were forced to flee to Wen's camp at Xunyang. Su allowed his soldiers to pillage the capital, and officials and commoners alike had their possessions—as well as clothes—stripped by Su's army, which even seized Empress Dowager Yu's servant girls. Empress Dowager Yu, humiliated by Su and fearful of what was to come, soon died in anxiety.

Su organized a new government, with Wang Dao, whom Su respected, as the titular regent, but with Su himself in actual power. Meanwhile, Yu and Wen organized efforts to recapture the capital. Wen's cousin Wen Chong (溫充) suggested inviting Tao, a capable general with a sizable army, to be the supreme commander of the army. However, Tao, still resentful of Yu, initially refused. Eventually he relented and joined Wen and Yu. They advanced east toward Jiankang. In response, Su forcibly took Emperor Cheng to the fortress of Shitou and put him and his attendants under virtual arrest. Meanwhile, Wang was secretly ordering the commanderies to the east to rise against Su, and he eventually persuaded Su's general Lu Yong (路永) to defect with him to Wen and Tao's army as well. Xi also arrived with his forces from Guangling (in modern Huai'an, Jiangsu).

The Su and anti-Su forces battled for months, indecisively, and despite the numeric advantage the anti-Su forces had, they were unable to prevail, leading Tao to at one point consider withdrawing. However, Wen was able to persuade him to stay and continuing the battles against Su. In the fall, during an assault on Shitou, the anti-Su forces initially suffered losses, but as Su was making a counterattack against them, he fell off his horse and was hit by spears. The anti-Su soldiers rushed him and decapitated him. Su's forces initially supported his brother Su Yi (蘇逸) as leader and continued to defend Shitou, but by early 329 were defeated.

In the aftermaths of Su Jun's defeat, with Jiankang having been heavily damaged by war, the top officials considered moving the capital to either Yuzhang (豫章, in modern Nanchang, Jiangxi) or Kuaiji (in modern Shaoxing, Zhejiang), but after Wang opposed, noting that Jiankang was in a better position to monitor the northern defenses against Northern archrival Later Zhao, the capital remained at Jiankang. Wen was requested to remain in Jiankang as regent, but he, believing that Emperor Ming intended Wang to serve that role, yielded the position to Wang. Meanwhile, Yu Liang, initially offering to resign all of his posts and go into exile, accepted a provincial governor post.

In light of his mother's death, the eight-year-old Emperor Cheng appeared to have been raised by his paternal grandmother, Lady Xun, from this point on.

=== Wang Dao's regency ===
In late 329, Wen Jiao died, and the general Guo Mo (郭默) soon assassinated his successor Liu Yin (劉胤) and seized Jing Province for himself. Wang Dao initially wanted to avoid another war and placated Guo, but Tao Kan and Yu Liang opposed, and their forces quickly converged on Jiang Province's capital Xunyang (尋陽, in modern Jiujiang, Jiangxi) in 330, killing Guo.

Meanwhile, during and after the Su Jun Disturbance, Jin forces in central China, without the central government's aid, were unable to hold their positions and eventually lost most of central China to Later Zhao. Key cities lost during this time included the old capital Luoyang, Shouchun (壽春, in modern Lu'an, Anhui), and Xiangyang (in modern Hubei), although Xiangyang was recaptured in 332. In 333, Jin also lost Ning Province (寧州, modern Yunnan and Guizhou) to Cheng-Han (but regained it in 339).

As regent, Wang largely restored his earlier policy of lenience and lax enforcement of the laws, greatly stabilizing the political scene but also leading to the spreading of corruption and incompetence. Eventually, in 338, Yu Liang tried to persuade Xi Jian to join him in moving to depose Wang, but after Xi refused, Yu did not carry out his plan.

In 336, Emperor Cheng married his wife Empress Du. Both of them were 15.

In 337, Murong Huang, the Xianbei chief who had been a Jin vassal with the Jin-bestowed title of Duke of Liaodong, claimed the title of Prince of Yan notwithstanding Jin's failure to grant him that title, effectively declaring independence and establishing Former Yan, although Murong Huang continued to claim to be a Jin vassal.

In 339, Yu wanted to make a major attack against Later Zhao, hoping to recapture central China, and Wang initially agreed with him, but after opposition by Xi and Cai Mo, Emperor Cheng ordered Yu not to carry out the war plans. Wang died in the fall of that year, and was succeeded by his assistant He Chong (何充) and Yu Liang's younger brother Yu Bing. Emperor Cheng let He and Yu Bing decide most important matters, but also appeared to start making some decisions of his own. Yu Bing and He tried to reform some of the problems with Wang's regency, but did not appear very effective at doing so.

=== Late reign ===
After Wang Dao's death, Yu Liang resumed his plans for a campaign against Later Zhao, and this brought a major response by Later Zhao's emperor Shi Hu in late 339. Later Zhao forces inflicted great damage on many Jin cities and bases north of the Yangtze and captured Zhucheng (邾城, in modern Huanggang, Hubei). Humiliated, Yu cancelled the plans for a northern expedition, and he died in early 340.

Also in 340, Murong Huang formally requested that he be granted the title Prince of Yan. After protracted debates among key officials about whether Murong Huang was still a faithful vassal, Emperor Cheng himself ruled that the request be granted.

In spring 341, Empress Du died. Emperor Cheng would not create another empress.

Later that year, Emperor Cheng decreed that the refugees from northern and central China, who had fled south during the times of Emperor Huai and Emperor Min due to Five Barbarians Uprising, who had retained household registrations according to their native commanderies, be henceforth registered with the commanderies that they were now living in. This pragmatic move allowed the local commanderies to have greater manpower and reduced redundancy in local administrations.

In summer 342, Emperor Cheng grew gravely ill. He had two young sons -- Sima Pi and Sima Yi, then still in cradles, by his concubine Consort Zhou. Yu Bing, fearful that the Yu Clan would lose power if a young emperor were named, persuaded Emperor Cheng that in the face of the powerful enemy Later Zhao that an older emperor should be named. Emperor Cheng agreed and designated his younger brother, Sima Yue the Prince of Langya be his heir, despite He Chong's opposition. He issued an edict entrusting his sons to Yu Bing, He, Sima Xi (司馬晞) (Prince of Wuling), Sima Yu (Prince of Kuaiji) (Note: Both Sima Xi and Sima Yu were paternal uncles, being the surviving sons of Emperor Yuan.), and Zhuge Hui (諸葛恢). (Note: son of Zhuge Jing) He died soon thereafter and was succeeded by Prince Yue (as Emperor Kang).

== Era names ==
- Xianhe (咸和, Xiánhé): 15 April 326 – 10 February 335
- Xiankang (咸康, Xiánkāng): 10 February 335 – 11 February 342

== Family ==
- Empress Chenggong, of the Du clan of Jingzhao (成恭皇后 京兆杜氏; 321–341), personal name "Lingyang" (陵陽)
- Guiren, of the Zhou clan (貴人 周氏; d. 363)
  - Sima Pi, Emperor Ai (哀皇帝 司馬丕; 341–365), first son
  - Sima Yi, Duke Haixi (海西公 司馬奕; 342–386), second son
- Unknown
  - Princess Nanping (南平公主)
    - Married Liu Chisong (劉赤松)
  - Princess Xunyang (尋陽公主)
    - Married Wang Yizhi of Taiyuan (太原 王禕之)

== Notes ==
Emperor Cheng of Jin House of Sima Born: 321 Died: 26 July 342
Regnal titles
Preceded by Emperor Ming of Jin	Emperor of China; Eastern Jin; 326–342 with Empress Dowager Yu (326–328); Wang Dao (329–339)	Succeeded by Emperor Kang of Jin
