= Jiao Province Campaign =

Conflicts between the states of Western Jin and Eastern Wu (263-271)

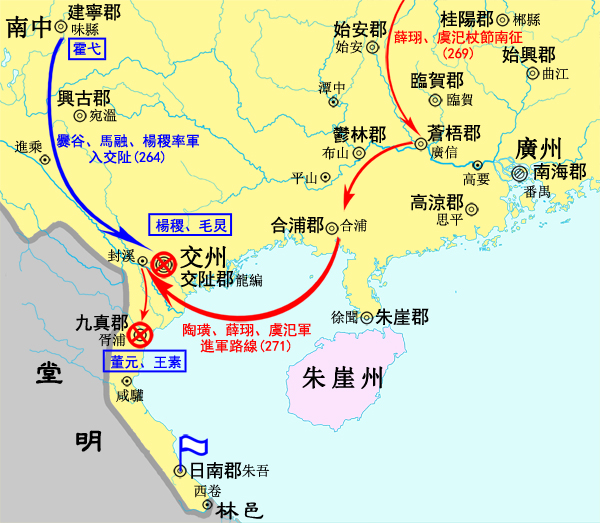
- The Jiao Province Campaign. Red arrows represent Eastern Wu advances and blue arrows represent advances by Cao Wei/Western Jin.
Date	c. May or June 263 – July or August 271
Location	Northern Vietnam, North Central Coast and Guangxi Zhuang Autonomous Region
Result	Eastern Wu victory: Eastern Wu reclaims Jiao Province

Belligerents
Eastern Wu	Cao Wei (until 266); Western Jin (from 266)

Commanders and leaders
Sun Xu †; Liu Jun †; Xiu Ze †; Gu Rong; Yu Si; Xue Xu; Tao Huang; Lương Kỳ	Lã Hưng (executed); Huo Yi #? (Note: Historical records did not indicate when Huo Yi died, but he had definitely died by 271, as Han Jin Chunqiu and Tao Huang's biography in Jin Shu both recorded that he had died by the time the Jiaozhi stronghold was sieged by Eastern Wu forces.); Cuan Gu; Ma Rong # Yang Ji (surrendered); Mao Jiong (executed); Dong Yuan †; Wang Su (surrendered)

Strength
First counteroffensive: Unknown; Second counteroffensive: 100,000+	Unknown

The Jiao Province Campaign, also known as the Jiaozhi Rebellion (Chinese: 交阯之亂; Vietnamese: Giao Chỉ chi loạn), was a military conflict between the states of Eastern Wu and Cao Wei from 264 to 266 and later between Wu and Wei's successor state the Western Jin from 266 to 271 during the Three Kingdoms period of China. The conflict was initially a local rebellion against Wu in Jiaozhi Commandery in 263, but in 264, Wei (replaced by Jin in February 266) intervened and took large parts of Wu's territory in Jiao and Guang provinces (廣州; covering present-day Guangdong and Guangxi). Wu went on the counteroffensive in 268, and by 271, they drove out the Jin forces and recovered all their lost territory. The campaign would be one of the last major victories of Wu during the final years of the Three Kingdoms.

== Background ==
During the fall of the Han dynasty, Jiao province or Jiaozhou was ruled by the warlord, Shi Xie and his family for roughly 40 years. The province encompassed modern-day northern Vietnam and Liangguang, and was composed of nine commanderies: Gaoliang (高涼郡; around present-day Yangjiang, Guangdong), Yulin, Cangwu, Nanhai, Zhuya, Hepu, Jiaozhi, Jiuzhen, and Rinan. As the Three Kingdoms began to emerge after 220, Shi Xie became a vassal of Sun Quan, the founder of Eastern Wu, but still retained his autonomy over Jiao. It was not until 227, following Shi Xie’s death the previous year, that Wu would take full control of the province after quelling the rebellion of Shi Xie’s son, Shi Hui.

Under the new Wu regime, Jiao experienced a number of revolts led by the province's local inhabitants. In 231, the Lạc Việt people in Jiuzhen rebelled, and more famously in 248, Lady Triệu led a rebellion against Wu in Jiuzhen and Jiaozhi. However, Wu was able to quell both rebellions.

== The campaign ==
=== Lã Hưng's Rebellion (263–264) ===
According to one account, in 262, the Wu emperor, Sun Xiu, sent the official, Deng Xun (鄧荀), to Jiaozhi to gather peacocks and wild boars. Previously, the Prefect of Jiaozhi, Sun Xu (孫諝) had sent thousands of craftsmen from the commandery to work in the capital, Jianye. When the people of Jiaozhi saw Deng Xun arrive, they thought that more of them were going to be forced to work in Jianye. Another account states that Sun Xu was a corrupt and cruel administrator who was deeply unpopular in Jiaozhi. After Deng Xun arrived, Deng Xun gathered 30 peacocks without imperial authority, and ordered the locals to escort the birds to Jianye. Regardless of which account is true, in May 263, a county official, Lã Hưng (呂興; Lü Xing) incited the people and soldiers of Jiaozhi to revolt, and the rebels killed both Sun Xu and Deng Xun.

When the rebellion first broke out, Wu was unable to immediately respond, as at the time, the state of Cao Wei launched an invasion against Wu's ally, Shu Han. Wu sent its armies to divert Wei's attention, but after Shu fell, they attempted to claim their ally’s former territories, which ended in failure. Sun Xiu died in September 264. Before his death, he established Guang province with the four commanderies in northern Jiao, namely Nanhai, Cangwu, Gaoliang, and Yulin.

Lã Hưng's rebellion inspired Jiuzhen and Rinan to also rebel. Lã Hưng led his troops to Hepu in hopes that the people there would also revolt. After the fall of Shu, he sent his Commandant, Đường Phổ (唐譜; Tang Pu), to Jincheng (進乘; in present-day Pingbian Miao Autonomous County, Yunnan) to reach out to Cao Wei's Chief Controller of Nanzhong, Huo Yi, for help. Huo Yi sent a letter to the Wei capital, Luoyang, to report on the matter and received a reply from the court in September 264. Lã Hưng was appointed the General Who Stabilises the South and Chief Controller of Jiao while Huo Yi was appointed Inspector of Jiao and given discretion over the province. Despite his office, Huo Yi would administer the province remotely from Nanzhong. He requested that a native of Jianning (建寧; around present-day Qujing, Yunnan), Cuan Gu be made Prefect of Jiaozhi, and dispatched him along with many other generals, most of whom formerly served Shu, to help Lã Hưng. However, before Wei forces could arrive, Lã Hưng was assassinated by his Officer of Merit, Lý Tống (李統; Li Tong).

=== Wei/Jin's Jiao Campaign (265–268) ===
In 265, Cuan Gu set out from Nanzhong to Longbian County to appease Jiaozhi and the other Wei-aligned territories. In February 266, Sima Yan (Emperor Wu of Jin) established the Western Jin dynasty, replacing Cao Wei. Huo Yi, Cuan Gu and the others thus became Jin subjects. Shortly after Jin formed, Cuan Gu died, so Huo Yi replaced him with Ma Rong (馬融; son of Ma Zhong). Later, Ma Rong also died of illness, so he was replaced with Yang Ji. After two years of administration, Jin consolidated its control over Jiaozhi and Jiuzhen, and they were also on the verge of taking Rinan. Jin's success in Jiao supposedly caused widespread unease throughout Wu's domain north of Hepu.

=== First Wu counteroffensive (268) ===
In 268, the Wu emperor, Sun Hao, began a campaign against Jin on multiple fronts, including a counteroffensive to reclaim Jiao. He sent the Inspector of Jiao, Liu Jun (劉俊), the Grand Commander, Xiu Ze (脩則) and the general Gu Rong (顧容) (Note: He should not be confused with his clansman who has a similar-sounding name (顾荣). Gu Rong's great-grandson Gu He has a biography in vol.83 of Book of Jin, which indicated that Gu Rong served as Inspector of Jingzhou under Eastern Wu.) to attack the province. The Wu generals carried out three attacks, and in all three of them, they were defeated by Yang Ji. The commanderies of Yulin and Jiuzhen also sided with Yang Ji during the conflict. Yang Ji sent his generals, Dong Yuan (董元) and Mao Jiong (毛炅) to attack Hepu. The Jin and Wu force clashed at Gucheng, where Jin scored a great victory, killing Liu Jun and Xiu Ze in the process. The remaining Wu soldiers scattered and fled back to Hepu. Mao Jiong was appointed Administrator of Yulin while Dong Yuan was appointed Administrator of Jiuzhen. Also, around this time, the southern states of Lâm Ấp and Funan sent tributes to Jin as a sign of friendship.

=== Second Wu counteroffensive (269–271) ===
==== Initial stages ====
In 269, Sun Hao launched a second counteroffensive, this time sending two armies. The first army, led by Yu Si and Xue Xu, marched through the roads of Jing province while the second army, led by Li Xu (李勗) and Xu Cun (徐存) marched along the coast from Jian'an. The two armies would meet at Hepu to attack Jiaozhi. However, Li Xu's army had trouble moving along the coastline, and after killing his guide general, Feng Fei (馮斐), Li Xu led his army to return. The minister He Ding (何定), accused Li Xu of killing Feng Fei and withdrawing without authorization. As a result, Sun Hao had Li Xu, Xu Cun and their families executed.

The army from Jing were thus left to fight the couteroffensive on their own. After they reached Hepu, Wu's Administrator of Cangwu, Tao Huang volunteered to lead an attack against Yang Ji at the Fen River (分水), but he was defeated and lost two generals in the battle. His superior, Xue Xu, was furious at him for his defeat, and was considering withdrawing from the province. However, later that night, Tao Huang launched a night raid against Dong Yuan and won a great victory, capturing much of the enemy's treasure before returning. The victory shifted Xue Xu's attitude towards Tao Huang, so much so that he decided to give Tao Huang command over the campaign.

==== Battle of Jiaozhi ====
In c.May 271, Yu Si led his army to attack and kill Dong Yuan, (Note: In Zizhi Tongjian Kaoyi, Sima Guang disagreed with the account found in Chronicles of Huayang, which indicated that Dong Yuan died of illness.) so Yang Ji appointed Wang Su (王素) as the new Prefect of Jiuzhen. Tao Huang used the loot from his battle with Dong Yuan to bribe a powerful leader of the Fuyan barbarians (扶嚴夷), Lương Kỳ (梁奇; Liang Qi) to help him, and Lương Kỳ brought with him more than 10,000 people. Instead of marching head-on to Jiaozhi, Xue Xu employed Tao Huang's strategy to use a sea route and catch the Jin army by surprise. Yang Ji sent Mao Jiong and Meng Yue (孟岳) to fight Wu, but they were badly routed at Fengxi (封溪, in present-day Đông Anh, Hanoi). During the battle, the Jin generals feigned a retreat and attempted to ambush the Wu army. However, Tao Huang saw through their ruse, and he used soldiers with long jis to defeat the ambush.

Yang Ji, Mao Jiong and the others fled back to Jiaozhi to defend the city. Tao Huang's army surrounded Jiaozhi and cut off the city's supply. By c.September 271, (Note: This was about four months after Dong Yuan's death; there was a leap 5th month in that year.) the rations in Jiaozhi had run out, and more than half of the city's population had died of hunger or disease. Soon, Tao Huang received the surrender of the city's garrison general, Wang Yue (王約). Jiaozhi was being attacked from within and outside, and more than 2,000 Jin defenders were killed along with the generals Zhang Deng (張登), Meng Tong (孟通) and Shao Hui (邵暉), while Yang Ji, Mao Jiong and the others were captured. (Note: The Zizhi Tongjian adopted this account over the account found in Tao Huang's biography in Book of Jin, which recorded that Tao sent supplies to the Jin defenders in order for them to last 100 days and fulfill an oath to Huo Yi. In Zizhi Tongjian Kaoyi, Sima Guang opinioned that given Sun Hao's temperament, Tao Huang would not dare risk his liege's wrath by sending supplies to the Jin defenders.) (Note: Vol.79 of Tongjian and Tao Huang's biography in Jin Shu both recorded that Mao was killed by Xiu Ze's son Xiu Yun.) For his deeds, Tao Huang was officially made Inspector of Jiao by Sun Hao.

==== Battle of Jiuzhen ====
Hearing the disastrous defeat at Jiaozhi, Wang Su and other Jin generals planned to abandon Jiao and flee back to Nanzhong. However, along the way, they were all captured by Tao Huang's general, Wei Pu (衛濮). The Jin Officer of Merit, Li Zuo (李祚) and Commandant, Shao Yin (邵胤), led their troops to defend Jiuzhen. Li Zuo's uncle, Li Huang (黎晃), who was a Wu general, advised him to surrender, but he refused. Tao Huang led his army to capture Jiuzhen, and after facing stiff resistance, he eventually captured the commandery. Not long after, Rinan and the other counties under Jin surrendered, and Jiao province was back under Wu's control.

== Aftermath ==
Sun Hao declared a general amnesty and divided Jiaozhi into Xinchang Commandery (新昌郡; around present-day Northern Vietnam) and new Jiaozhi to consolidate his control over Jiao. The Wu army soon clashed with the Fuyan people, but Wu pacified them and set up Wuping Commandery (武平郡; around present-day Northern Vietnam) in their territory. Tao Huang remained the Inspector of Jiao, and during his tenure, he formed Jiude Commandery (九德郡; around present-day North Central Coast, Vietnam) and introduced more than thirty counties in Jiuzhen. Tao Huang was lauded by the people of Jiao as a benevolent administrator, and no rebellion occurred in the province for the remainder of Wu's existence.

Wu's victory in Jiao was one of their few major victories against Jin along with the Battle of Xiling in 272. Yet, despite reclaiming the province, they were unable to turn the tide. In c.279, as Wu's Administrator of Hepu, Xiu Yun's death became a trigger in Guo Ma's rebellion that summer; less than a year later, Jin would conquer Wu, ending the Three Kingdoms period.

In c.315, Xiu Ze's other son Xiu Zhan would be invited by Liang Shuo to serve as his Inspector of Jiaozhou. Together, the pair managed to repel Wang Ji, the Inspector of Jiaozhou appointed by the warlord Wang Dun.
