= Wu Yan (general) =

3rd century Eastern Wu and Jin dynasty general

- 吾彥

Administrator of Jianping (建平太守)
- In office ? – 280
- Monarch: Sun Hao

Inspector of Jiaozhou (交州刺史)
- In office 290 – early 310s (Note: The Zizhi Tongjian recorded that Liang Shuo in c.315 invited Xiu Zhan to become his Inspector of Jiaozhou; the pair then resisted the inspector nominated by the warlord Wang Dun, Wang Ji. After Wu Yan, the only inspector with a confirmed tenure is Tao Wei (about three years). Tongjian recorded that Wu Yan was still Inspector of Jiaozhou in 307. Thus, the earliest Gu Mi could have taken over was late 307 or early 308.)
- Monarchs: Emperor Wu of Jin/ Emperor Hui of Jin/ Emperor Huai of Jin

Personal details
- Born: Unknown Suzhou, Jiangsu
- Died: between 307 and 315
- Courtesy name: Shize (士則)

Wu Yan (fl.260 – before 315), (Note: According to Tao Huang’s biography in the Book of Jin, after Wu Yan’s death, the office of Inspector of Jiaozhou was held by Gu Mi (顧秘; son of Gu Ti), then Gu Can (顧參; son of Gu Mi), and then Gu Shou (顧壽; younger brother of Gu Can). From Gu Zhong's biography in the Jin Shu, Gu Zhong, Shou's younger brother (and thus another son of Gu Mi), attempted to retrieve Shou's body in Jiaozhou after he was killed, but was blocked by Du Tao's rebellion. The rebellion ended in 315, so Wu Yan must have died prior to that year.) courtesy name Shize, was a military general of Eastern Wu during the Three Kingdoms period of China and later for the Jin dynasty (266–420). He is most known for his valiant defence of Jianping (建平; southwest of present-day Xiayi County, Henan) during Jin's conquest of Wu. After Wu fell, Wu Yan served in administrative positions under Jin, with his most notable being the Inspector of Jiaozhou, succeeding Tao Huang, who was also a former official of Wu.

== Service in Eastern Wu ==
Wu Yan was from Wu County in Wu Commandery and came from a poor background. The Book of Jin describes him as 8 chi tall (6 ft 2 in) and capable of fighting beasts with his bare hands. He began serving Wu as a minor official in Tongjiang County. In c.December 269, (Note: According to Sun Hao's biography in Sanguozhi, Xue Xu, Yu Si and Tao Huang set off from Jing province for the Jiao Province Campaign in the 11th month of the 1st year of the Jianheng era. This corresponds to 11 Dec 269 to 8 Jan 270 in the Julian calendar.) Wu Yan saw the general Xue Xu leading a large army in order to attack Jiaozhi Commandery, which caused Wu Yan to sigh out of frustration. A face reader named Liu Zhe (劉劄) examined Wu Yan's face and told him "Sir, based on your appearance, you too will reach the same height in your career one day. There is no need to yearn."

Wu Yan received his first military role under the Grand Marshal of Wu, Lu Kang. Lu Kang appreciated Wu Yan's talents, but because he had plucked him from obscurity, he could not promote him further out of fear that the other generals would disapprove. Lu Kang devised a plan to gather the generals together. Secretly, he had asked someone to pretend to be crazy and surprise the generals while swinging his sword. The generals fled in fear when they saw the supposed madman, but Wu Yan remained calm and even defended himself with a small desk. The generals present all praised his bravery, so Lu Kang was finally able to promote Wu Yan to important positions.

Wu Yan was eventually transferred to Jianping where he served as its administrator. In 272, the Inspector of Yi Province, Wang Jun, was tasked with constructing battleships in preparations for the conquest of Wu. Wood wastes from the construction floated down to Wu's territories which caught the attention of Wu Yan. He brought a piece of the wood to the Wu emperor, Sun Hao, as evidence that Jin was planning an invasion, and to persuade him to reinforce the northwestern border. However, Sun Hao ignored his warnings, so Wu Yan instead personally built iron chains as a barrier to prevent an eastward advance through the Yangtze.

In September 272, the Commander of Xiling (西陵; present-day Xiling District, Yichang, Hubei), Bu Chan, rebelled against Wu and surrendered his city to Jin. Upon hearing this, Wu Yan, along with Zuo Yi (左奕) and others, were ordered by Lu Kang to campaign against the rebel. In December, Lu Kang and his generals repelled Jin forces led by Yang Hu and quelled Bu Chan's rebellion.

At the end of 279, Jin initiated their conquest of Wu. The chains that Wu Yan had built caused some inconvenience for the Jin navy at first, but they were dealt with by Wang Jun, who melted them by sending rafts full of dummies soaked in oil and burning them. By 280, all of Wu's territories on the upper Yangtze River were conquered by Jin except Jianping, where Wu Yan continued to resist. Jin sent a large army to subdue Jianping, but Wu Yan managed to hold out in the city. Eventually, the Jin army gave up and retreated to a respectful distance from Jianping. Wu Yan only submitted after Sun Hao surrendered in Jiankang, thus ending the Three Kingdoms.

== Service in the Jin dynasty ==
After the fall of Wu, surviving officials of Wu were sent to the Jin capital at Luoyang. At Luoyang, Wu Yan was appointed by Emperor Wu of Jin as Administrator of Jincheng. Shortly after, Emperor Wu asked another former Wu official, Xue Ying on why Sun Hao failed, to which Xue spoke negatively of his former emperor. Later that day, Emperor Wu asked the same question to Wu Yan, and Wu replied, "The lord of Wu was a brilliant man. His vassals were virtuous and wise." Emperor Wu laughed and said, "If so, then why did Wu perish?" Wu Yan responded, "Only Heaven can decide if one will endure or perish. That was why Your Majesty was able to subdue us. Since this is all Heaven's work, why must mortal doings be to blame?" The minister, Zhang Hua, was nearby when this happened and told Wu Yan, "Sir, you had been a general of Wu for years, yet I had never heard about you. How odd." Wu Yan replied, "Even His Majesty knows about me, so how could you not have?" Emperor Wu was impressed by Wu Yan's remarks and praised him.

Wu Yan went on to serve as Prefect of Dunhuang, and Administrator of Yanmen. He was eventually appointed the Interior Minister of Shunyang (順陽; south of present-day Xichuan County, Henan). The Prince of Shunyang at the time, Sima Chang (司馬暢; son of Sima Jun), was said to be very arrogant and extravagant. Chang had charged many of the previous Interior Ministers before Wu Yan of crimes they had not committed. However, he was unable to do so with Wu Yan, who upheld the law and practised strict punishments on criminals to the point that many feared him. Sima Chang did not dare slander him and instead only recommended him to become a Cavalier In Regular Attendance Without Assignment (散骑常侍) to send him away.

In c.290, the Inspector of Jiaozhou and also a former Wu official, Tao Huang died. Wu Yan was appointed Commander of Nanzhong and Inspector of Jiaozhou to replace Tao Huang. Tao's death sparked a rebellion in Jiuzhen Commandery led by Zhao Zhi (趙祉) who ousted the Administrator of Jiaozhou, but Wu Yan managed to quell the revolt. He spent more than twenty years in Jiaozhou, where he maintained the peace around the region. Near the end of his life, Wu Yan requested to be replaced, so he was appointed as the Empress's Chamberlain (大長秋) before he died in office. He was succeeded as Inspector of Jiaozhou by Gu Mi, son of Gu Ti.

His last recorded activity was in 307, when the general Li Zhao (李釗) was sent to quell a tribal rebellion in Ningzhou (寧州, modern Yunnan and Guizhou) that had broken out the prior year. Wu Yan, then still Inspector of Jiaozhou, sent his son Wu Zi (吾咨) to assist Li against the tribes.

== Anecdote ==
=== Animosity from Lu Kang's sons ===
Emperor Wu once questioned Wu Yan on who was better between Lu Kang and his cousin, Lu Xi (陸喜; son of Lu Mao). Wu Yan remarked, "In moral prestige, Kang is inferior to Xi. In meritorious deeds, Xi does not compare to Kang." After Wu Yan was stationed in Jiaozhou, he sent gifts to Lu Kang's sons, Lu Ji and Lu Yun. Ji wanted to accept them at first, but Yun stopped him, citing his poor upbringing as well as the remark he made about their father. Ji agreed, and the two began speaking lowly about Wu Yan to others. However, one official, Yin Yu (尹虞), admonished the brothers for judging Wu Yan by his circumstances and ruthlessly slandering him for a minor disrespect. The brothers, realizing their mistakes, stopped their criticism of Wu Yan and became friendlier with him.
