= Conquest of Wu by Jin =

Military campaign by Jin against Eastern Wu (279-280)

- Part of the wars of the Three Kingdoms period
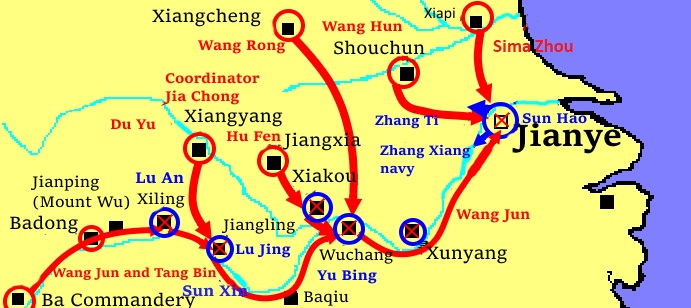
- A map showing the Jin conquest of Wu
Date	c. December 279 or January 280 (Note: The Zizhi Tongjian recorded that the Jin dynasty launched the invasion of Eastern Wu in the 11th month of the 5th year of the Xianning era of Sima Yan's reign. This month corresponds to 21 December 279 to 18 January 280 in the Gregorian calendar.) – 1 May 280 (Note: The Zizhi Tongjian recorded that Sun Hao surrendered on the renyin day of the 3rd month of the 1st year of the Taikang era of Sima Yan's reign. This date corresponds to 1 May 280 in the Gregorian calendar.)
Location	Southern China
Result	Jin victory
Territorial changes	Unification of China under the Jin dynasty

Belligerents
Jin dynasty	Wu

Commanders and leaders
Jia Chong; Wang Jun; Du Yu; Wang Rong; Hu Fen; Sima Zhou; Wang Hun	Sun Hao (surrendered); Zhang Ti †

Strength
200,000	230,000

Casualties and losses
15,000	

Conquest of Wu by Jin
- Traditional Chinese: 晉滅吳之戰
- Simplified Chinese: 晋灭吴之战
Transcriptions
Standard Mandarin
- Hanyu Pinyin: Jìn miè Wú zhī zhàn

Taikang campaign
- Chinese: 太康之役
Transcriptions
Standard Mandarin
- Hanyu Pinyin: Tàikāng zhī yì

The conquest of Wu by Jin was a military campaign launched by the Jin dynasty against the state of Wu from late 279 to mid 280 at the end of the Three Kingdoms period of China. The campaign, which started in December 279 or January 280, concluded with complete victory for the Jin dynasty on 1 May 280 when the Wu emperor Sun Hao surrendered. After the campaign, the Jin emperor Sima Yan (Emperor Wu) changed the era name of his reign from "Xianning" to "Taikang". Hence, the campaign has also been referred to as the Taikang campaign. (Note: Lu Ji referred to the campaign as the "Taikang campaign" in his essay "Bian Wang Lun" (辯亡論), which discussed the reasons for Wu's fall.)

The campaign is significant in pre-1911 Chinese military history as it not only ended the chaos of the Three Kingdoms period and reunified China under the Jin dynasty, but was also the first successful large-scale military operation in Chinese history that involved a massive invasion force crossing the Yangtze. Among other aspects, its multi-directional approach, invasions by both land and water, and the sending of a naval fleet downstream along the Yangtze, have had strong influences on subsequent battles in Chinese military history.

== Background ==
=== The Three Kingdoms ===
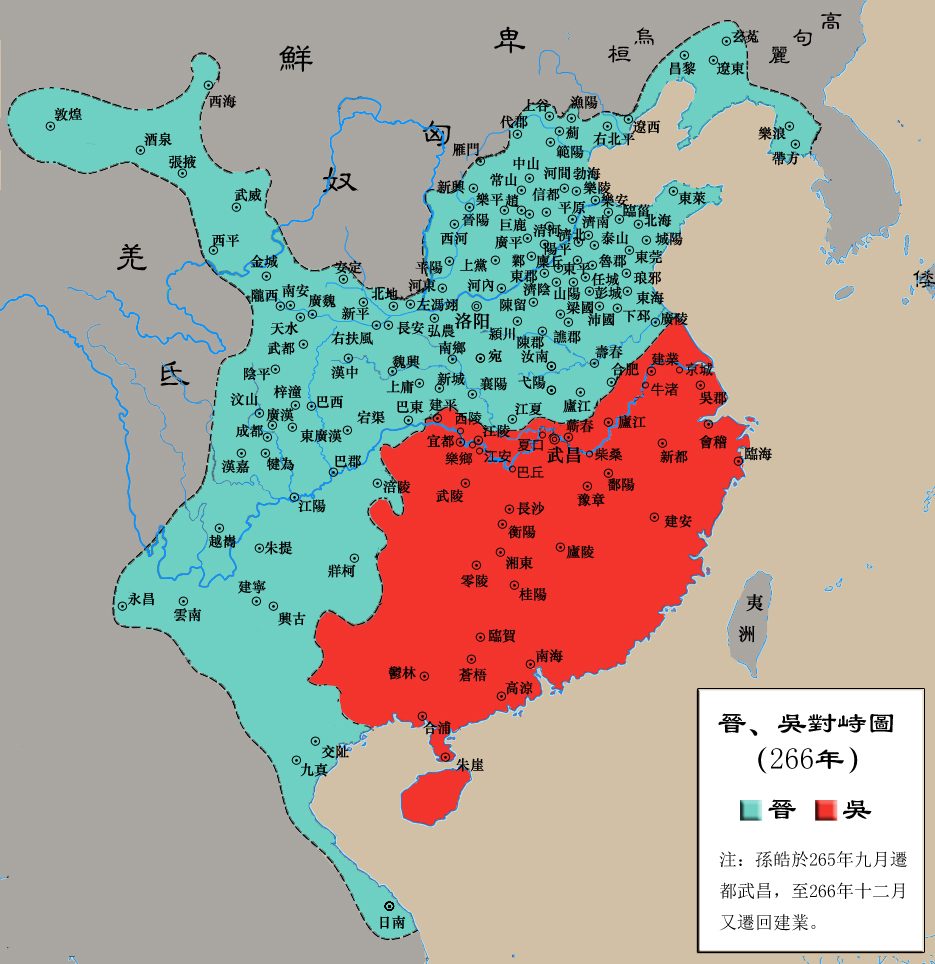
Map of China divided between the Jin dynasty (blue) and Eastern Wu (red) in the year 266.

Following the end of the Eastern Han dynasty in 220, three contending states emerged in China and fought for control over the territories of the former Han Empire. Among the three, Wei was the most powerful one in terms of military prowess, economic resources, manpower and geographical size. The other two, Shu and Wu, reestablished their alliance against Wei in 223.

=== Rise of the Jin dynasty ===
From as early as 262, the Wei regent Sima Zhao had already started planning for the conquests of Wei's two rival states. He decided to attack Shu first because an invasion of Wu required costly and labour-intensive preparations such as constructing naval vessels and opening up waterways for the vessels. He also pointed out that if Wei managed to conquer Shu, they could make use of Shu's geographical advantage by sending a naval fleet downstream from Shu to attack Wu. In the winter of 262, as the Wei government mobilised troops from the various provinces for the Shu invasion, they also put Tang Zi in charge of overseeing the construction of warships in preparation for a future invasion of Wu.

In February 266, about 26 months after the surrender and end of Shu, Sima Zhao's son and successor Sima Yan usurped the throne from the last Wei emperor Cao Huan and established the Jin dynasty to replace Wei. During this time, Sima Yan heeded his advisers' suggestions to win over the Shu people's hearts by showing benevolence and generosity, as well as to induce Wu subjects to defect to Jin by tempting them with rewards and incentives. Among other things, he made the former Shu emperor Liu Shan a duke, and awarded peerages, titles and appointments to numerous former Shu subjects and their descendants, including Luo Xian, Chen Shou, Zhuge Jing, Lü Ya, Fei Gong and Chen Yu.

On 29 April 269, Sima Yan ordered Yang Hu to station at Xiangyang and supervise military affairs in the Jin-controlled territories in Jing Province.

=== Decline of Wu ===
In 264, following the Wu emperor Sun Xiu's death, his nephew Sun Hao came to the throne. In the same year, the Wei regent Sima Zhao sent two former Wu officers Xu Shao (徐紹) and Sun Yu (孫彧), who defected to Wei during the Shouchun rebellion, to deliver a letter to Sun Hao. In the letter, Sima Zhao pointed out that Wu stood no chance against a Wei invasion and told Sun Hao that he would be treated generously if he surrendered.

Around April 265, Sun Hao sent Ji Zhi (紀陟) and Hong Qiu (弘璆) as his emissaries to meet Sima Zhao, and express his desire for Wei and Wu to coexist peacefully. Ji Zhi and Hong Qiu accomplished their diplomatic mission well and even impressed Sima Zhao with their replies to questions from various Wei officials.

Sima Zhao died in September 265. In February 266, after Sima Zhao's eldest son Sima Yan usurped the Wei throne and established the Jin dynasty, Sun Hao sent Zhang Yan (張儼) and Ding Zhong (丁忠) as his representatives to attend a memorial service for Sima Zhao. After Ding Zhong returned, he advised Sun Hao to launch an attack on the Jin-controlled Yiyang Commandery (弋陽郡; around present-day Xinyang, Henan) because it was poorly guarded. When Sun Hao consulted his subjects, Lu Kai and Liu Zuan opposed and supported launching the attack respectively. Sun Hao secretly desired to heed Ding Zhong's suggestion but ultimately dropped the idea after considering the recent fall of Wu's ally state Shu.

In comparison with Wei and the subsequent Jin dynasty, Wu experienced greater problems of its own: the succession from the third Wu emperor, Sun Xiu, was marred with bloodshed and internal conflict. Sun Xiu's successor, Sun Hao, was a tyrant who made little effort to prepare for the imminent invasion by the Jin dynasty. Sun Hao's rule was more harsh as compared to the later part of the reign of Sun Quan, Wu's founding emperor. This caused a continuous wave of peasant uprisings and military mutinies, which mainly took place in present-day Zhejiang and Guangdong. Not only did Sun Hao refuse to accept advice to strengthen Wu's defences and reduce the burden on its people, he also executed around four dozen high-ranking officials who provided good counsel on governance. As a result, the Wu government had already lost the popular support of the people, and many regional commanders stationed at the border defected to the Jin dynasty.

At the same time, Sima Yan sent envoys to Wu to cease hostilities between the two states, in order to buy time for making preparations. The Wu emperor Sun Hao, in turn, viewed such actions as a sign of weakness of the Jin dynasty, and further let down his guard.

== Jin preparations ==
Sima Yan had long harboured the ambition of conquering Wu. On 29 April 269, he designated three locations as bases for staging the invasion, and gave assignments to three generals as follows:

- Yang Hu to be stationed at Xiangyang to oversee military affairs in Jing Province;
- Wei Guan to be stationed at Linzi to oversee military affairs in Qing Province;
- Sima Zhou to be stationed at Xiapi to oversee military affairs in Xu Province.

During his tenure in Jing Province, Yang Hu governed the region well and not only gained the locals' trust and respect, but also attracted many defectors from the Wu side. He also reduced the number of troops assigned to patrol and guard the Jin–Wu border, and reassigned them to work in agricultural colonies covering an area of over 800 qing. When he first came to Jing Province, his troops had less than 100 days' worth of food supplies. However, by the end of his third year in Jing Province, his troops had produced and stockpiled sufficient food supplies to last them for about ten years.

=== Construction of a navy in Yi Province ===
In 272, Yang Hu pointed out to Sima Yan that their forces could take advantage of their position in Yi Province and send a naval fleet downstream along the Yangtze to attack Wu. He secretly recommended to the emperor to appoint Wang Jun, who previously served as an army adviser under him, to serve as the Inspector of Yi Province (益州刺史) and oversee the construction of a naval fleet. Shortly after he was appointed as the Inspector of Yi Province, Wang Jun was also commissioned as Prancing Dragon General (龍驤將軍) and put in charge of supervising military affairs in Yi and Liang provinces.

Wang Jun reassigned his troops from farming in the agricultural colonies to start building vessels for the upcoming naval invasion of Wu. During this time, Wang Jun's assistant He Pan pointed out that they needed to recruit at least 10,000 labourers from every commandery in Yi Province for the project, which could be completed within a year. He Pan also advised Wang Jun to notify the central government after they had started the project because the central government might reject their idea of recruiting 10,000 labourers from every commandery. Wang Jun heeded He Pan's advice.

To make up for the Jin navy's lack of experience in naval warfare in comparison to the Wu navy, Wang Jun constructed many large vessels equipped with ram bows. The largest of these vessels were 120 bu long and capable of carrying up to 2,000 troops on board. These vessels also had viewing towers and three-storey-tall fortifications made of strong wood. In addition, the vessels had doors on all four sides to allow troops to board and get off easily. Horses could even run freely on board. It took Wang Jun a total of seven years to build the naval fleet and the only thing left to do was to train his troops in naval warfare.

=== Yang Hu's role ===
In November or December 276, Yang Hu wrote a memorial to Sima Yan to outline a plan for the conquest of Wu as follows: Jin forces in Yi Province to attack Wu from the west on both land and water; Jin forces in Jing Province to attack Jiangling; Jin forces in Yu Province to attack Xiakou; and Jin forces in Xu, Yang, Qing and Yan provinces to attack Moling. He explained that the idea of invading Wu from multiple directions was to confuse the Wu forces and demoralise the Wu forces by creating the impression of an overwhelming invasion. He further pointed out Wu's only strategic advantage was the Yangtze, which served as a natural barrier. However, once the Jin forces break through the Wu defences along the Yangtze, the Wu forces would retreat to behind their walled cities and fortresses. By then, the Jin forces, which were more adept in land-based warfare, would gain the upper hand over their adversaries. He also noted that Sun Hao was a highly unpopular ruler among his people and that a Jin invasion would provide a long-awaited opportunity for many Wu subjects to defect to the Jin side.

Sima Yan strongly agreed with Yang Hu's views and wanted to implement the plan. When Yang Hu's plan was put up for discussion in the Jin imperial court, many officials, including Jia Chong, Xun Xu and Feng Dan, argued that it was not time to attack Wu yet because they had to deal with the Xianbei rebels in Yong and Liang provinces. Only Du Yu and Zhang Hua supported Yang Hu's proposal.

In July or August 278, due to poor health, Yang Hu left his post at Xiangyang and moved to Luoyang to recuperate. When Sima Yan sent Zhang Hua to visit him, Yang Hu told Zhang Hua that they should seize the opportunity to conquer Wu while Sun Hao was still in power since Sun Hao's tyranny had already caused him to lose popular support from the Wu people. He also recommended Du Yu to replace him as the general overseeing military affairs in Jing Province. He died on 27 December 278.

=== Other preparations ===
In October 276, the preparation was roughly completed and Yang Hu suggested to Sima Yan to launch the attack. Yang Hu's suggestion was initially accepted but then delayed due to Jia Chong's objection, because northwestern China was still in the midst of a tribal rebellion. In July 277, additional assignments were given in order to prepare for the campaign against Eastern Wu:

- Wang Hun (王渾) was put in charge of military affairs of Yang Province
- Sima Liang was put in charge of military affairs of Yu Province
- Hu Fen (胡奮) was put in charge of military affairs along the northern shore of the Yangtze River

After Yang Hu's death, Du Yu succeeded him and was appointed Senior General Who Conquers the South (征南大將軍) to take charge of military affairs in Jing Province from November 278.

== Wu preparations ==
In February 270, the Wu general Ding Feng led an attack Jin's southern border at Wokou (渦口; northeast of present-day Huaiyuan County, Anhui) but was driven back by Jin forces under Qian Hong. In May of that year, following Shi Ji's death, the Wu emperor Sun Hao put his general Lu Kang in charge of military affairs in an area covering present-day Yichang and Gong'an in western and southern Hubei.

Before Lu Kang died in 274, he foresaw that Xiling (西陵; around present-day Yichang, Hubei) was a crucial location along Wu's western border so he advised Sun Hao to pay closer attention to the Wu defences in that area. After Lu Kang's death, Sun Hao split Lu Kang's command among his five sons: Lu Yan (陸晏), Lu Jing, Lu Xuan (陸玄), Lu Ji and Lu Yun (陸雲).

In the meantime, the wood shavings and other waste products from Wang Jun's naval construction project in Yi Province floated downstream along the river and entered Wu territory. The Wu officer Wu Yan, who was stationed at Jianping Commandery (建平郡; around present-day Zigui County, Hubei), picked up the wood shavings and realised that the Jin dynasty was building a naval fleet to attack Wu. He then sent the wood shavings to Sun Hao as evidence of an impending Jin invasion, and advised the emperor to send more troops to guard Jianping. When Sun Hao ignored him, Wu Yan ordered his troops to use heavy iron chains to set up a blockade along the river and prevent enemy vessels from passing through.

== Previous battles between Jin and Wu ==
In 272, a battle broke out between Wu and Jin at in Xiling (西陵; around present-day Yichang, Hubei). After the Wu general Bu Chan started a rebellion against Wu, the Jin dynasty sent reinforcements to Xiling to support him. The Wu general Lu Kang led his troops to defeat the Jin reinforcements and recapture Xiling. (Note: See Battle of Xiling for details.)

Overview of battles between Jin and Wu during Sun Hao's reign
Date	Location(s)	Wu order of battle	Jin order of battle	Sources
268	Jiangxia, Xiangyang, Hefei and Jiaozhi	Sun Hao; Shi Ji; Ding Feng; Zhuge Jing; † Liu Jun (劉俊); † Xiu Ze (脩則); Gu Rong (顧容)	Sima Wang; Hu Lie; Shi Bao; Sima Jun; Yang Ji (楊稷); Mao Jiong (毛炅)	Book of Jin 648, vol. 3, Chen and Pei 429, 55, Zizhi Tongjian 1084, vol. 79
269	Guyang, Jiaozhi	Ding Feng; Yu Si; Xue Xu; Tao Huang; (executed) Li Xu (李勖); Xu Cun (徐存); Feng Fei (馮斐)	Yang Ji (楊稷); Mao Jiong (毛炅); Dong Yuan (董元); Meng Gan (孟幹); Meng Tong (孟通); Li Song (李松); Wang Ye (王業); Cuan Neng (爨能)	Chen and Pei 429, 48, Chen and Pei 429, 55
270	Unknown	Ding Feng	Qian Hong	Book of Jin 648, vol. 3
271	Shouchun	Sun Hao	Sima Wang	Book of Jin 648, vol. 3, Chen and Pei 429, 48
272	Xiling	Lu Kang; Zuo Yi; Wu Yan; Cai Gong (蔡貢); Zhang Xian (張咸); Sun Zun (孫遵); Liu Lü (留慮); Zhu Wan; Lei Tan (雷譚); Yu Zan (俞贊); Zhu Qiao (朱喬)	(executed) Bu Chan; (executed) Bu Ji (步璣); Yang Hu; Yang Zhao; Xu Yin (徐胤)	Chen and Pei 429, 58, Book of Jin 648, vol. 34
273	Yiyang and Runan	Xue Ying; Lu Shu	Wang Hun	Book of Jin 648, vol. 42
274	Jiangxia	Sun Zun (孫遵); Li Cheng (李承)	Ji Xi (嵇喜)	Book of Jin 648, vol. 3
275	Jiangxia			Book of Jin 648, vol. 3
277	Jiangxia and Runan	Sun Shen		Book of Jin 648, vol. 34

== Prelude ==
Timeline of the Conquest of Wu by Jin
Approximate date range	Location	Event(s)
21 December 279 – 18 January 280	various locations	The Jin dynasty sends a total of more than 200,000 troops to launch a massive invasion of Eastern Wu from multiple directions: Sima Zhou to attack Tuzhong; Wang Hun to attack the Jiangxi region; Wang Rong to attack Wuchang; Hu Fen to attack Xiakou; Du Yu to attack Jiangling; Wang Jun and Tang Bin to attack from Yi Province. Jia Chong reluctantly agrees to serve as Grand Chief Controller to coordinate the campaign from Xiangyang; Yang Ji serves as his deputy. Zhang Hua oversees supplies and logistics for the campaign.
18 February – 17 March 280	various locations	Du Yu and Wang Hun break through all the Wu defences in their way along the border.
18–19 March 280	Zigui County, Hubei	Wang Jun and Tang Bin defeat Sheng Ji in battle.
18–19 March 280	Xiling Gorge, Hubei	Wang Jun destroys the barricades set up by Wu forces in the river, and clear the way for his naval fleet to pass through.
20 March 280	Yichang, Hubei	Wang Jun conquers Xiling and kills Liu Xian in battle.
22–24 March 280	Jingmen and Yidu, Hubei	Wang Jun conquers Jingmen and Yidao and kills Lu Yan in battle.
22–24 March 280	Songzi, Hubei	Zhou Zhi defeats and captures Sun Xin in battle at Le District.
25 March 280	Hubei	Wang Jun defeats and kills Lu Jing in battle.
3 April 280	Jiangling County, Hubei	Du Yu conquers Jiangling and kills Wu Yan.
3 April 280	Gong'an County, Hubei	Hu Fen conquers Jiang'an.
3 April 280	Southern China	The administrators of the Wu-controlled commanderies south of the Yuan and Xiang rivers, extending into Jiao and Guang provinces, voluntarily surrender to the Jin dynasty.
4 April 280	Luoyang, Henan	Sima Yan issues an imperial edict outlining the next phase in the conquest of Wu: Wang Jun and Tang Bin to assist Hu Fen and Wang Rong in conquering Xiakou and Wuchang, and sail along the Yangtze towards Moling; Du Yu to pacify the newly conquered Wu territories in southern Jing Province and send reinforcements to aid Wang Jun and Tang Bin; Jia Chong to be stationed at Xiang County to oversee the campaign.
4–16 April 280	Wuhan, Hubei	Hu Fen conquers Xiakou with support from Wang Jun.
4–16 April 280	Wuhan and Ezhou, Hubei	Wang Rong sends Luo Shang and Liu Qiao to attack Wuchang with support from Wang Jun. Liu Lang and Yu Bing surrender control of Jiangxia and Wuchang.
4–16 April 280	Qichun County and Huanggang, Hubei	Meng Tai convinces the Wu forces at Qichun and Zhu counties to surrender to Wang Rong.
4–16 April 280	Nanjing, Jiangsu	Sun Hao orders Zhang Ti, Shen Ying, Sun Zhen and Zhuge Jing to lead 30,000 troops across the Yangtze to attack Wang Hun.
17–30 April 280	He County, Anhui	Jin forces led by Zhou Jun, Xue Sheng, Jiang Ban and Zhang Qiao defeat Wu forces in battle at Yanghe. Zhang Ti, Shen Ying and Sun Zhen are killed in battle.
17–30 April 280	Ezhou, Hubei	Wang Jun leads his forces from Wuchang to attack Jianye. Sun Hao orders Zhang Xiang to lead a 10,000-strong naval force to resist Wang Jun. Zhang Xiang surrenders to Wang Jun.
17–30 April 280	Nanjing, Jiangsu	As Wang Hun, Wang Jun and Sima Zhou lead their forces towards Jianye, He Zhi and Sun Yan voluntarily surrender to Wang Hun.
17–30 April 280	Nanjing, Jiangsu	Sun Hao heeds Xue Ying and Hu Chong's advice to surrender to Jin. He sends emissaries to separately meet Wang Hun, Wang Jun and Sima Zhou and convey his desire to surrender.
1 May 280	Shitou, Nanjing, Jiangsu	Wang Jun leads 80,000 troops and hundreds of vessels to Shitou to receive Sun Hao's surrender.

Sometime between 21 December 279 and 18 January 280, (Note: It is unknown if Jin was aware of Guo Ma's rebellion in Guangzhou, which started in the summer of 279.) Jin deployed a total of over 200,000 troops from its regular 500,000-strong armed forces for the invasion of Wu. By that time, the Jin navy was also at least on par with the Wu navy in terms of strength. However, the Jin invasion forces did not enjoy numerical superiority because it faced the entire Wu armed forces consisting of about 230,000 troops and over 5,000 vessels. Nevertheless, the Jin invaders had a much higher morale compared to the Wu defenders. Moreover, the Wu forces were scattered along the Jin–Wu border over a distance of several thousand li, thus making it easier for the Jin forces to concentrate their attacks on isolated pockets of Wu resistance. Based on this principle, Jin launched the invasion of Wu along the Yangtze in five routes to support the naval fleet setting out from Yi Province and advancing downstream towards Wu's eastern border. The Jin invasion forces came from six directions as follows:

- Sima Zhou to lead an army from Xiapi (下邳; around present-day Pizhou, Jiangsu) to attack Tuzhong (塗中; around present-day Chuzhou, Anhui);
- Wang Hun to lead an army from Shouchun (壽春; present-day Shou County, Anhui) to attack Jiangxi (江西; a region north of the Yangtze covering parts of present-day Jiangsu and Anhui); (Note: Not to be confused with present-day Jiangxi Province in China.)
- Wang Rong to lead an army from Xiangcheng to attack Wuchang (武昌; present-day Ezhou, Hubei);
- Hu Fen to lead an army from Jiangxia Commandery (江夏郡; present-day Yunmeng County, Hubei) to attack Xiakou;
- Du Yu to lead an army from Xiangyang to attack Jiangling County;
- Wang Jun and Tang Bin to lead a naval fleet from Yi Province downstream to attack Wu territories in Jing Province.

To better coordinate the six groups' movements, the Jin emperor Sima Yan ordered Wang Jun and his naval fleet to take orders from Du Yu after capturing Jianping Commandery (建平郡; around present-day Zigui County, Hubei), and take orders from Wang Hun after reaching Moling (秣陵; present-day Nanjing, Jiangsu).

Sima Yan granted Jia Chong acting imperial authority and ordered him to serve as Grand Chief Controller (大都督) to oversee the campaign and coordinate the movements of the six groups from Xiangyang. He also appointed Yang Ji as Jia Chong's deputy. When Jia Chong initially gave the excuse that he was already old and expressed reluctance in taking up this responsibility, Sima Yan told him that he would personally direct the campaign if Jia Chong refused to do so. Jia Chong then relented and accepted his appointment. Sima Yan also appointed Zhang Hua as Secretary of Fiscal Revenue (度支尚書) to oversee supplies and logistics for the campaign.

=== Wu strategy ===
Since the Wu emperor Sun Hao did not believe that the Jin dynasty was capable of taking Wu and the overconfidence in the Yangtze River as the natural defensive barrier, barely anything was done to prepare for the incoming campaign. However, Wu did reinforce its defences by deploying iron awls linked together by iron chains in the Three Gorges to prevent ships from passing, but Sun Hao and his followers were so overconfident about this additional measure that not a single soldier was deployed to guard the region.

== Wang Jun and Tang Bin's route ==
Between 19 January and 17 March 280, Wang Jun set out from Chengdu, the capital of Yi Province, and rendezvoused with his deputy Tang Bin at Badong Commandery (巴東郡; present-day Chongqing). From there, they led the Jin naval fleet, comprising 50,000 or 70,000 troops, as it sailed downstream along the Yangtze to attack Wu's eastern border. (Note: The Huayang Guo Zhi recorded that Wang Jun set out from Chengdu with a 70,000 strong army in the 12th month of the 5th year of the Xianning era; this month corresponds to 19 January to 17 February 280 in the Gregorian calendar. The Jin Shu recorded that Wang Jun reported that he had 80,000 troops (after the redeployment on 4 April 280), and that he set out from Chengdu in the 1st month of the 1st year of the Taikang era; this month corresponds to 18 February to 17 March 280 in the Gregorian calendar.) At Jianping Commandery (建平郡; around present-day Zigui County, Hubei), they encountered strong resistance led by the Wu officer Wu Yan and failed to capture Jianping, so they took a detour and advanced further east towards Danyang (丹楊; east of present-day Zigui County, Hubei). On 18 March 280, they conquered Danyang and captured its defending officer, Sheng Ji (盛紀).

=== Destruction of the blockade at Xiling Gorge ===
After conquering Danyang, the Jin naval fleet continued its journey downstream and arrived at Xiling Gorge, where they encountered the blockade set up earlier by Wu Yan. Wu Yan had ordered his troops to connect an array of iron awls, each measuring more than one zhang, with heavy iron chains and put them into the water to block enemy vessels from passing through. However, the Jin naval fleet knew about the blockade through intelligence gathered earlier by Yang Hu from captured Wu spies, so they were prepared to deal with the situation.

Wang Jun ordered his men to build a dozen large rafts, each over 100 bu wide, and place straw dummies on them. He also ordered large torches, each measuring over ten zhang in length and over ten wei in circumference, to be placed in front of every raft and drenched in oil. He then deployed the rafts ahead of his fleet towards the blockade. When the rafts became stuck in the blockade, Wang Jun ordered his men to set the rafts on fire. After burning for several hours, the iron awls and chains melted and cleared the way for the Jin naval fleet to pass through.

=== Fall of Xiling, Jingmen and Yidao ===
On 20 March 280, Wang Jun and his forces conquered Xiling (西陵; around present-day Yichang, Hubei) and killed the Wu officers Liu Xian (留憲), Cheng Ju (成據) and Yu Zhong. Two days later, they seized control of Jingmen and Yidao (夷道; present-day Yidu, Hubei) and killed the Wu officer Lu Yan.

When Wang Jun conquered Xiling, Du Yu wrote to him to give him the green light to advance further east along the Yangtze and conquer Moling (秣陵; present-day Nanjing, Jiangsu), the Wu capital. Wang Jun was so pleased after reading Du Yu's letter that he sent it to the Jin emperor Sima Yan.

== Du Yu and Hu Fen's routes ==
Between 18 February and 17 March 280, the Jin army led by Du Yu broke through all the Wu defences along the Jin–Wu border as they advanced towards Jiangling County. Upon reaching their destination, Du Yu ordered his troops to besiege Jiangling County while sending his subordinates Fan Xian (樊顯), Yin Lin (尹林), Deng Gui (鄧圭) and Zhou Qi (周奇) to lead a separate detachment to clear a path along the Yangtze for Wang Jun's naval fleet approaching from the west. They managed to capture all the Wu territories along the way within ten days.

=== Fall of Lexiang ===
Du Yu also sent Zhou Zhi (周旨), Wu Chao (伍巢) and Guan Ding (管定) to lead 800 soldiers to cross the Yangtze at night and prepare for an attack on Lexiang (樂鄉; east of present-day Songzi, Hubei). When they reached Mount Ba (巴山; southwest of present-day Songzi, Hubei), they started many fires and planted many flags around the area to mislead the Wu defenders into thinking that the Jin army was larger than it actually was. At the same time, they raided key locations around Lexiang to confuse and strike fear in the enemy. Sun Xin, the Wu officer guarding Lexiang, felt so shocked and terrified that he wrote to Wu Yan (伍延), the Wu officer defending Jiangling County, as follows: "The armies coming from the north must have flown across the river."

Zhou Zhi, Wu Chao and Guan Ding led their 800 men to lay in ambush outside Lexiang. In the meantime, as Wang Jun's naval fleet was approaching Lexiang from the west along the Yangtze, Sun Xin sent troops out of Lexiang to drive back the enemy but they failed. When Sun Xin's defeated troops returned to Lexiang, the three Jin officers and their 800 men used the opportunity to infiltrate the city without being detected. They swiftly seized control of Lexiang, captured Sun Xin in his own camp, and sent him as a captive to Du Yu.

On 25 March 280, the Jin forces occupied Lexiang and killed the Wu naval officer Lu Jing. Shi Hong (施洪), a Wu general, surrendered to them.

=== Fall of Jiangling and Jiang'an ===
When Du Yu ordered his troops to increase the intensity of their attacks on Jiangling County, Wu Yan pretended to surrender to Du Yu while instructing his men to stand on guard at the top of the city walls. On 3 April 280, Du Yu managed to break through Wu Yan's defences and conquer Jiangling County. Wu Yan was killed in battle.

Around the same time, the Jin army led by Hu Fen also conquered Jiang'an (江安; present-day Gong'an County, Hubei).

== Redeployment of Jin forces on 4 April 280 ==
On 4 April 280, Sima Yan issued an imperial edict to promote Wang Jun to the position of General Who Pacifies the East (平東將軍), grant him acting imperial authority, and put him in charge of overseeing military affairs in Yi Province. He also issued another imperial edict to redeploy the six groups as follows:

- Wang Jun and Tang Bin to advance further east along the river and conquer Baqiu (巴丘; present-day Yueyang, Hunan). They would then assist Hu Fen and Wang Rong in their respective missions, and advance downstream along the river towards the Wu capital, Moling (秣陵; present-day Nanjing, Jiangsu).
- Hu Fen to attack Xiakou with support from Wang Jun and Tang Bin. After conquering Xiakou, Hu Fen would transfer 7,000 troops from his command to Wang Jun.
- Wang Rong to attack Wuchang (武昌; present-day Ezhou, Hubei) with support from Wang Jun and Tang Bin. After conquering Wuchang, Wang Rong would transfer 6,000 troops from his command to Tang Bin.
- Du Yu to seize control of three commanderies in southern Jing Province: Lingling (零陵; around present-day Yongzhou, Hunan), Guiyang (桂陽; present-day Chenzhou, Hunan), and Hengyang (衡陽; west of present-day Xiangtan, Hunan). Once southern Jing Province had been pacified, Du Yu would transfer 10,000 troops and 7,000 troops from his command to Wang Jun and Tang Bin respectively.

Jia Chong, the overall commander of the campaign, received orders to move to Xiang County (項縣; present-day Shenqiu County, Henan) to coordinate the movements of the six groups.

== Surrenders of Jiao and Guang provinces ==
After the fall of Jiangling County, the administrators of the Wu-controlled commanderies located south of the Yuan and Xiang rivers, extending into Jiao and Guang provinces, voluntarily surrendered to the Jin forces led by Du Yu. After receiving the administrators' official seals, Du Yu used the acting imperial authority granted to him by the Jin government to accept the administrators' surrenders and pacify them. At the point in time, Du Yu's army had killed or captured 14 enemy area commanders and army supervisors, and more than 120 enemy officers and commandery administrators. Du Yu also appointed officials to govern the newly conquered Wu territories in Nan Commandery (南郡; around present-day Jiangling County, Hubei) and restored peace and stability in Jing Province. Many Wu citizens defected to the Jin dynasty on their own accord. (Note: However, according to their biographies in Book of Jin (as both continued to serve the Jin dynasty), the Eastern Wu Inspectors of Jiao and Guang provinces, Tao Huang and Teng Xiu, surrendered after Sun Hao's.)

== Hu Fen and Wang Rong's routes ==
From the redeployment on 4 April until 16 April 280, the Jin naval fleet led by Wang Jun and Tang Bin carried out their mission by assisting Hu Fen and Wang Rong's armies in attacking and capturing Xiakou and Wuchang (武昌; present-day Ezhou, Hubei) respectively.

At Wuchang, Wang Rong ordered his subordinates Luo Shang and Liu Qiao to lead his army's vanguard force to attack the city. The Wu officers Yang Yong (楊雍) and Sun Shu (孫述), along with Jiangxia Commandery's administrator Liu Lang (劉朗), led their followers to surrender to Wang Rong.

After conquering Wuchang, Wang Rong and his army advanced further south and reached the northern banks of the Yangtze. During this time, a Wu officer Meng Tai (孟泰) managed to persuade the Wu defenders at Qichun County and Zhu County (邾縣; present-day Huanggang, Hubei) to surrender to Wang Rong; the two counties thus came under Jin control.

== Wang Hun's route ==
On 13 March 280, the Jin army led by Wang Hun advanced towards Hengjiang (橫江; an area located southeast of present-day He County, Anhui on the northern bank of the Yangtze facing the Caishiji Scenic Resort on the southern bank) and broke through the Wu defences. Wang Hun also sent his subordinates Chen Shen (陳慎) and Zhang Qiao (張喬) to lead a detachment of troops to attack Xunyang (尋陽; southwest of present-day Huangmei County, Hubei) and Laixiang (瀨鄉; east of present-day Luyi County, Henan). They succeeded in their missions, defeated Wu forces under Kong Zhong (孔忠), and captured Zhou Xing (周興) and four other Wu officers in battle.

Wang Hun and his army advanced further, defeated Wu forces led by Li Chun (李純) and Yu Gong (俞恭), and captured or killed many Wu soldiers. Two Wu generals, Chen Dai (陳代) and Zhu Ming (朱明), became so fearful that they voluntarily surrendered to Wang Hun.

=== Battle of Ban Bridge ===
Between 17 and 30 April 280, the Wu emperor Sun Hao ordered his chancellor Zhang Ti and the generals Shen Ying (沈瑩), Zhuge Jing and Sun Zhen to lead an army of 30,000 from Moling (秣陵; present-day Nanjing, Jiangsu) and cross the Yangtze to attack the Jin invaders. When they reached Niuzhu (牛渚; in present-day Ma'anshan, Anhui), Shen Ying predicted that the Jin naval fleet would eventually break through the Wu defences in Jing Province, so he advised Zhang Ti to adopt a defensive stance by holding their positions at the lower reaches of the Yangtze and prepare to make a final stand when the Jin naval fleet showed up. Zhang Ti, however, argued that the Wu army's morale would collapse if the Jin naval fleet managed to make its way to Moling, so they should strike back at the Jin invaders. From his point of view, if the Wu army succeeded in driving back the Jin invaders or at least preventing them from advancing further, they could then join forces with the remaining Wu forces in Jing Province and strengthen their defences.

In mid-April 280, Zhang Ti led the Wu forces to attack the Jin officer Zhang Qiao (張喬), who had 7,000 troops with him, near Yanghe Bridge (楊荷橋; southeast of present-day He County, Anhui). After Zhang Qiao surrendered, Zhuge Jing urged Zhang Ti to execute all the captives because he believed that they were pretending to surrender. He also warned Zhang Ti that the surrendered Jin soldiers could potentially pose a threat to them later. Zhang Ti refused to heed Zhuge Jing's suggestion as he thought that it was unwise to execute enemy soldiers who surrendered.

When Wang Hun learnt of the Wu attack at Yanghe Bridge, he ordered his subordinates Zhang Han (張翰), Sun Chou (孫疇) and Zhou Jun to lead troops to resist the Wu army. At Ban Bridge (版橋; north of present-day Hanshan County, Anhui), both sides got into their battle formations and prepared to fight. During the battle, Shen Ying led 5,000 members of the Wu army's elite "Danyang Corps" (丹陽兵) and charged into the Jin formation several times but the Jin forces managed to hold their ground. The rest of the Wu army felt demoralised upon seeing the failure of the "Danyang Corps" to break the Jin formation so they became chaotic and disorganised when their commanders called for a retreat. Two Jin officers, Xue Sheng (薛勝) and Jiang Ban (蔣班), seized the opportunity to lead their units to launch a fierce counterattack on the enemy. The Wu army fell apart as the soldiers scattered and fled in different directions while their commanders failed to stop them from deserting. At the same time, the Jin officer Zhang Qiao and his men, who had surrendered to the Wu army earlier, capitalised on the momentum to turn against their captors and attack them from the rear. The Wu generals Sun Zhen and Shen Ying, along with 7,000 to 8,000 Wu soldiers, perished in the battle.

The Wu general Zhuge Jing, who managed to flee the battlefield with 500 to 600 men, encountered Zhang Ti along the way and asked him to join them in retreating back to Moling. When Zhang Ti declined, Zhuge Jing held him and told him there was no need to seek death. However, Zhang Ti firmly refused to flee to because he wanted to fulfil his allegiance to Wu. Zhuge Jing had no choice but to tearfully let him go. After Zhuge Jing retreated further by about 100 bu (paces), the pursuing Jin soldiers caught up with Zhang Ti and killed him.

Shortly after the Battle of Ban Bridge, the Wu minister He Zhi (also Sun Hao's maternal uncle) and general Sun Yan (孫晏) surrendered to the Jin army under Wang Hun.

=== Wang Hun's refusal to attack Moling ===
After the Jin victory at Ban Bridge, Zhou Jun's subordinate He Yun advised him to lead their troops across the Yangtze and besiege the Wu capital Moling (秣陵; present-day Nanjing, Jiangsu) so as to pressure the Wu emperor Sun Hao into voluntarily surrendering. Zhou Jun agreed with He Yun and wanted to propose this idea to his superior, Wang Hun. However, He Yun predicted that Wang Hun would not agree because he was not authorised by the Jin emperor Sima Yan to attack Moling. He Yun was proven right later; Wang Hun stubbornly refused to launch an attack on Moling even after Zhou Jun and He Yun urged him to.

== Sima Zhou's route ==
Sima Zhou led his army towards Tuzhong (塗中; around present-day Chuzhou, Anhui), where he ordered his deputy Liu Hong (劉弘) to lead the troops to the northern bank of the Yangtze facing the Wu capital Moling (秣陵; present-day Nanjing, Jiangsu) on the opposite side. Later, after the Jin victory at the Battle of Ban Bridge, Sima Zhou ordered his chief clerk Wang Heng (王恆) to lead the troops across the Yangtze to attack the Wu positions along the river. In the ensuing battle, they captured Cai Ji (蔡機), the Wu officer supervising the defences along the river. Between 50,000 and 60,000 Wu soldiers either lost their lives in the battle or surrendered to the Jin forces. The Wu general Zhuge Jing, who fled after the Battle of Ban Bridge, brought along his colleague Sun Yi (孫奕) to surrender to Sima Zhou.

== Wu's last-ditch efforts ==
Between 17 and 30 April 280, after assisting Hu Fen and Wang Rong's army groups in conquering Xiakou and Wuchang (武昌; present-day Ezhou, Hubei), the Jin naval fleet led by Wang Jun and Tang Bin continued its journey downstream along the Yangtze towards the Wu capital, Moling (秣陵; present-day Nanjing, Jiangsu). Since the fleet set out from Chengdu in early 280, they had been successful in conquering all the Wu territories along the way without suffering much losses as the Wu defences in Jing Province fell easily. By the time the fleet was heading towards Moling, its strength had increased from its initial 50,000 or 70,000 to about 80,000 or 100,000 after receiving 30,000 more troops from three other Jin army groups: 7,000 from Hu Fen's army group, 6,000 from Wang Rong's army group, and 17,000 from Du Yu's army group.

When the Jin naval fleet reached Sanshan (三山; southwest of present-day Nanjing, Jiangsu), the Wu emperor Sun Hao ordered his general Zhang Xiang (張象) to lead 10,000 troops to resist the enemy. Zhang Xiang, knowing that he stood no chance against the enemy, surrendered to Wang Jun without putting up a fight.

Around the time, the Wu officer Tao Jun, (Note: a brother of Tao Huang) who had just returned to Moling from Wuchang, went to meet Sun Hao. When the Wu emperor enquired the status of the Wu navy, Tao Jun said: "The enemy vessels constructed in Shu are all so small. If we have 20,000 troops and our larger vessels, it will be enough to defeat them." Sun Hao then hastily assembled another naval fleet and put Tao Jun in command. However, most of the Wu soldiers deserted on the night before they were due to set out to attack the Jin fleet.

== Sun Hao's surrender ==
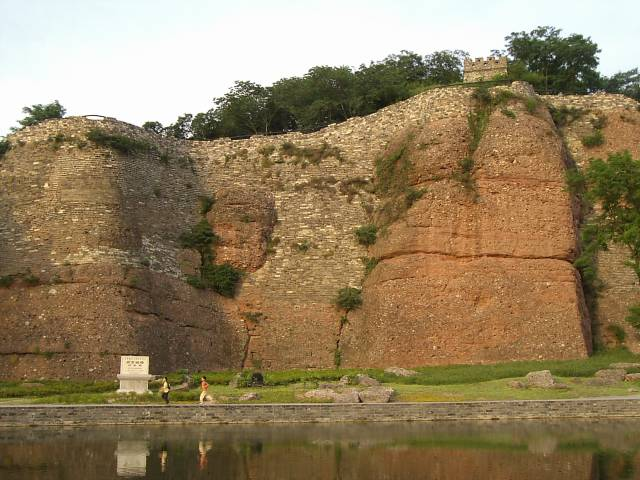
Remains of a stone wall at the Stone City (Shitou) in present-day Nanjing where Sun Hao surrendered to Wang Jun on 1 May 280.

By 30 April of 280, Sun Hao grew extremely fearful when he heard that Wang Jun's naval fleet, as well as Sima Zhou and Wang Hun's army groups, were already nearing the first gate at Moling (秣陵; present-day Nanjing, Jiangsu). He became even more so when he learned that Wang Jun's fleet was so gigantic in size that all of their flags, banners, weapons, and armour could easily cover the surface of the Yangtze River. Heeding the advice of his advisors, Xue Ying and Hu Chong, Sun Hao decided the best course of action would be to give up all resistance and finally surrender to Wang Jun. He ordered both Xue Ying and Hu Chong to write to Wang Jun, Sima Zhou and Wang Hun a surrender document, which read as follows:

"Sun Hao of the Wu Commandery bows to you and pleads for his life. Many years ago, the Han dynasty collapsed, and the Nine Provinces became fractured. Hoping to seize the advantage, my predecessors seized the lands, mountains and rivers of Jiangnan and its surrounding commanderies, not knowing that we were becoming farther separated from Wei as the years passed. Now that the great Jin Dynasty has risen to power, its virtuous name covers the four great seas; yet we, in our complacency, ignorance and incompetence, failed to truly realize the will and ways of the very heavens themselves. Alas, I hurriedly must now trouble the six armies to traverse the lands, line the paths, and travel such long distances along the riverbank to reach me. Everyone within this State is mortified of the might of said armies, and realizes that Sun Wu's doom is certainly upon us. I muster every last ounce of courage within me to plead for the favor, magnanimity and greatness of the Imperial Court, so that they will forgive and accept us. Having said this, I respectfully send my Minister of Ceremonies Zhang Kui, along with several more of my ministers and officials, to present to you my Imperial Seal and silk ribbon as a token of my complete and unconditional capitulation. I entrust my life to you in the hopes of being spared, and also sincerely hope that you will trust me and accept my surrender, so that the people will be saved."

The very next day, 1 May 280, Sun Hao would issue his final imperial edict, asking his people to not be upset about the end of Sun Wu, but to instead prepare themselves to become formal subjects of the Jin dynasty. He then stripped his upper body of all of its clothing and tied himself up (a formal way of presenting prisoners-of-war to a battle's victors), brought along a coffin, and traveled to Shitou (within present day Nanjing, Jiangsu) to formally surrender to Wang Jun, formally ending the kingdom of Eastern Wu. Wang Jun used the acting imperial authority granted to him by Emperor Sima Yan and the Jin government to accept Sun Hao's surrender, freeing him from his bonds and burning the coffin, before sending him to Luoyang to be presented to Sima Yan.

At the time of Wu's fall, according to the official maps and documents collected by Wang Jun, Wu's territories covered a total of four provinces, 43 commanderies and 313 counties. It had a population of 2.3 million people and 523,000 households, as well as 32,000 officials and 230,000 troops.

== Aftermath ==
With Jianye's fall and Sun Hao's surrender, the kingdom of Eastern Wu, as well as the Three Kingdoms period, came to an end, and after nearly 100 years of power struggles, fighting and unnecessary bloodshed, China was at long last reunified under the Western Jin dynasty. The Jin commanders who participated in the campaign were handsomely rewarded, and ironically, Jia Chong, the overall commander who had opposed the campaign received the largest reward, the tax income of 8,000 households. A small conflict broke out within the Imperial Court immediately after the Jin forces' victory when Wang Jun became furious that Wang Hun was the one to take down Jianye. Wang Jun wrote to the Imperial Court, angrily proclaiming that he had watched Sun Hao for over 100 days, yet Wang Hun seized the advantage before he could advance on Jianye. Wang Hun counter-argued that Wang Jun had disobeyed orders and embezzled the spoils of war behind the Imperial Court's back. Wang Jun, meanwhile, defended himself by saying that what Wang Hun had said was slanderous. However, Wang Hun's power and influence within the Imperial Court enabled him to gain the upper hand, with his followers implying that Wang Jun should be jailed. In the end, Sima Yan finally ended the conflict by rewarding Wang Jun handsomely.

== Order of battle ==
=== Jin forces ===
- Emperor of Jin (晉帝) Sima Yan
  - Secretary of Fiscal Revenue (度支尚書) Zhang Hua
- Grand Chief Controller (大都督) Jia Chong
  - Champion General (冠軍將軍) Yang Ji (楊濟)
- General Who Guards the Army (鎮軍將軍) Sima Zhou
  - Chancellor of Langya (琅邪相) Liu Hong (劉弘)
  - Chief Clerk (長史) Wang Heng (王恆)
- General Who Stabilises the East (安東將軍) Wang Hun (王渾)
  - Inspector of Yang Province (揚州刺史) Zhou Jun (周濬)
    - Assistant Officer (別駕) He Yun (何惲)
  - Army Protector Who Attacks Wu (討吳護軍) Zhang Han (張翰)
  - Major (司馬) Sun Chou (孫疇)
  - Army Adviser (參軍) Chen Shen (陳慎)
  - Xue Sheng (薛勝)
  - Jiang Ban (蔣班)
  - Commandant of Chengyang (成陽都尉) Zhang Qiao (張喬)
- Senior General Who Guards the South (鎮南大將軍) Du Yu
  - Administrator of Xiangyang (襄陽太守) Zhou Qi (周奇)
  - Army Adviser (參軍) Fan Xian (樊顯)
  - Army Adviser (參軍) Yin Lin (尹林)
  - Army Adviser (參軍) Deng Gui (鄧圭)
  - Officer of the Standard (牙門將) Zhou Zhi (周旨)
  - Officer of the Standard (牙門將) Guan Ding (管定)
  - Officer of the Standard (牙門將) Wu Chao (伍巢)
- General Who Establishes Martial Might (建威將軍) Wang Rong
  - Army Adviser (參軍) Luo Shang (羅尚)
  - Army Adviser (參軍) Liu Qiao (劉喬)
- General Who Pacifies the South (平南將軍) Hu Fen (胡奮)
- Prancing Dragon General (龍驤將軍) (Note: Wang Jun was promoted to General Who Pacifies the East (平東將軍) on 4 April 280.) Wang Jun
  - General Who Spreads Martial Might (廣武將軍) Tang Bin (唐彬) (Note: Tang has a biography in vol.42 of Book of Jin)

=== Wu forces ===
- (surrendered) Emperor of Wu (吳帝) Sun Hao
  - (surrendered) Guerrilla General (游擊將軍) Zhang Xiang (張象)
  - Area Commander of Xuling (徐陵督) Tao Jun (陶濬)
- † Imperial Chancellor (丞相) and Military Adviser (軍師) Zhang Ti
  - (surrendered) Deputy Military Adviser (副軍師) Zhuge Jing (諸葛靓)
  - † Administrator of Danyang (丹陽太守) Shen Ying (沈瑩)
  - † Army Protector (護軍) Sun Zhen
- (surrendered) Administrator of Jianping (建平太守) Wu Yan (吾彥)
- † Army Supervisor (監軍) Lu Yan
- † General Who Guards the South (鎮南將軍) Liu Xian (留憲)
- † General Who Attacks the South (征南將軍) Cheng Ju (成據)
- † Administrator of Yidu (宜都太守) Yu Zhong
- (POW) Supervisor of Danyang (丹楊監) Sheng Ji (盛紀)
- † Area Commander of Jiangling (江陵督) Wu Yan (伍延)
- (POW) Area Commander of Lexiang (樂鄉都督) Sun Xin
- † Navy Commander (水軍督) Lu Jing
- (surrendered) General Who Pacifies the West 平西將軍) Shi Hong (施洪)
- (surrendered) Administrator of Jiangxia (江夏太守) Liu Lang (劉朗)
- (surrendered) Yang Yong (楊雍)
- (surrendered) Sun Shu (孫述)
- (surrendered) Officer of the Standard (牙門將) Meng Tai (孟泰)
- † Officer of the Standard (牙門將) Kong Zhong (孔忠)
- (POW) General of Martial Might (武威將軍) Zhou Xing (周興)
- † Army Protector (護軍) Li Chun (李純)
- † Yu Gong (俞恭)
- (surrendered) General Who Establishes Martial Might (曆武將軍) Chen Dai (陳代)
- (surrendered) General Who Pacifies Barbarians (平虜將軍) Zhu Ming (朱明)
- (POW) Cai Ji (蔡機)
- (surrendered) Sun Yi (孫奕)

== In Romance of the Three Kingdoms ==
In the 14th-century historical novel Romance of the Three Kingdoms, the task of building a navy for the Jin dynasty was credited to Zhong Hui before the fall of Shu, when Zhong Hui recommended to Sima Zhao that constructing a large navy to attack Wu was a diversion to trick Shu into letting down its guard, and when it was time to truly attack Wu after the conquest of Shu, the navy would be ready. In reality, however, the idea of constructing a large navy originated from Wang Jun and Sima Yan, and the plan was set into motion only after the fall of Shu.

In the novel, the last event before the campaign ended was described to be Zhang Xiang's surrender when he led a 10,000 strong navy to engage Jin forces. Since the Wu imperial court had not received news of Zhang Xiang's surrender yet, Wang Jun ordered Zhang Xiang to return to the Wu capital Jianye to trick the Wu defenders into opening the city gates. Zhang Xiang followed as instructed and Jin forces swiftly conquered Jianye. The Wu emperor Sun Hao surrendered and that marked the end of Wu. In history, however, before Sun Hao's surrender, there was one last battle at Sanshan (三山), just southeast of Jianye, between Wang Jun's army and a smaller force led by Wu general Tao Jun (陶濬).
