= He Zhi =

Late 3rd century Eastern Wu official

- 何植

Minister over the Masses (司徒)
- In office September or October 279 – 280
- Monarch: Sun Hao
- Preceded by: Dong Chao

Personal details
- Born: Unknown Jurong, Jiangsu
- Died: Unknown
- Relations: He Hong (brother); He Jiang (brother); Lady He (sister)
- Parent: He Sui (father)
- Occupation: Official
- Courtesy name: Yuangan (元干)

He Zhi (fl. 264–280), courtesy name Yuangan, was an official of the state of Eastern Wu during the late Three Kingdoms period (220–280) of China. He was a younger brother of Lady He, who married Sun He, a son and former heir apparent of the first Wu emperor Sun Quan. In 264, Sun He and Lady He's son, Sun Hao, ascended the throne as the fourth and last emperor of Wu. He Zhi, as a maternal uncle of the reigning emperor, rose to a more prominent position in the Wu government. In 279, Sun Hao appointed He Zhi as Minister over the Masses when Guo Ma started a rebellion in Wu, and ordered his maternal uncle and others to lead troops to suppress the revolt. In the following year, the Jin dynasty conquered Wu, after which Sun Hao surrendered. It is not known what happened to He Zhi after the fall of Wu.

== See also ==
- Lists of people of the Three Kingdoms
