= Sima Zhou =

Jin dynasty imperial prince and general (227–283)

Sima Zhou 司馬伷

Prince of Langya (琅邪王)
- Tenure: 5 October 277 – 12 June 283
- Successor: Sima Jin

Prince of Dongguan (東莞王)
- Tenure: 9 February 266 – 4 October 277
- Born: 227
- Died: 12 June 283 (aged 56)
- Spouse: Lady Zhuge (died 304; (Note: Her son Sima Yao was at Yecheng in August 304 to tend to her funeral, where he offended Sima Ying, the Prince of Chengdu who was stationed at the city. Sima Yao was later arrested and executed in September.) daughter of Zhuge Dan and elder sister of Zhuge Jing)
- Issue Detail: Sima Jin; Sima Dan; Sima Yao; Sima Cui
Names
- Family name: Sima (司馬); Given name: Zhou (伷); Courtesy name: Zijiang (子將)
Posthumous name
- Wu (武)
- House: House of Sima
- Father: Sima Yi
- Mother: Lady Fu

Sima Zhou (227 – 12 June 283), courtesy name Zijiang, posthumously known as Prince Wu of Langya (琅琊武王), was an imperial prince and military general of the Jin dynasty of China. He previously served in the state of Cao Wei during the Three Kingdoms period. His grandson, Sima Rui, was the founding emperor of the Eastern Jin dynasty.

== Life under Cao Wei ==
Sima Zhou was born to Sima Yi and his concubine Lady Fu (伏氏); he was Lady Fu's second son. (Note: The Book of Jin recorded the age order of Lady Fu's four sons.) He had three full brothers: Sima Liang, Sima Jing (司馬京) and Sima Jun (司馬駿). He started his career as a military officer in the state of Cao Wei during the Three Kingdoms period. As a youth, he already had a reputation for being talented. He was also well regarded because of his family background; the Sima family would later become the de facto rulers of Wei from February 249 (after the Incident at the Gaoping Tombs). Sima Zhou was first appointed as Ningshuo General (寧朔將軍) and put in charge of the security of the Wei nobles living in Ye city. At some point during the Zhengshi era (240–249) of Cao Fang's reign, he was enfeoffed as the Marquis of Nan'an Village (南安亭侯). Later, he was promoted to a Regular Mounted Attendant (散騎常侍) and elevated from a village marquis to a district marquis under the title "Marquis of Dongwu District" (東武鄉侯). In April 258, his father-in-law Zhuge Dan was killed after rebelling; his wife Lady Zhuge was spared (Note: One reason why Lady Zhuge was spared could be that the couple's eldest son Sima Jin was then about two years old; Lady Zhuge could also have been pregnant with their second son, Sima Dan. Sima Jin's biography in Book of Jin recorded that he was 35 (by East Asian reckoning) when he died in 290 (1st year of the Tai'xi era).) while other relatives of Zhuge Dan were killed.

In June 260, the Wei emperor Cao Mao attempted to seize back power from the Sima family by staging a coup d'état against the regent Sima Zhao (Sima Zhou's half-brother). Sima Zhou, then holding the position of a Colonel of the Garrison Cavalry (屯騎校尉), led his troops to stop Cao Mao. However, his men dispersed in fear when Cao Mao shouted at them. Cao Mao eventually met his end at the hands of Cheng Ji (成濟), a subordinate of Sima Zhao's adviser, Jia Chong.

In 263, during the reign of Cao Huan, Sima Zhou was appointed as General of the Right (右將軍) and Inspector (刺史) of Yan Province. A year later, after Sima Zhao restored the five-rank nobility system, which had previously been abolished, Sima Zhou was enfeoffed as the Count of Nanpi (南皮伯). He was also reassigned to be General Who Attacks Barbarians (征虜將軍) and granted imperial authority.

== Life under the Jin dynasty ==
On 8 February 266, a few months after Sima Zhao's death, his son Sima Yan (Emperor Wu) usurped the throne from Cao Huan and established the Jin dynasty to replace the Cao Wei state, with himself as the new emperor. The day after his coronation, Emperor Wu enfeoffed his uncle Sima Zhou as the Prince of Dongguan (東莞王) with a princedom comprising 10,600 taxable households. He also granted permission to all the princes to appoint the county prefects/chiefs for the counties in their princedoms. Sima Zhou petitioned Emperor Wu to remove this privilege, but the emperor refused.

On 17 March 268, Emperor Wu appointed Sima Zhou as Right Supervisor of the Masters of Writing (尚書右僕射) and General Who Pacifies the Army (撫軍將軍). In c.April 269, he reassigned Sima Zhou to be Senior General Who Guards the East (鎮東大將軍) and granted him imperial authority to replace Wei Guan in supervising military affairs in Xu Province. During his tenure, Sima Zhou instilled good discipline among the troops and earned their respect. The military leaders in the Jin dynasty's rival state, Eastern Wu, were very wary of him.

On 5 October 277, Emperor Wu heeded a suggestion by the minister (and his uncle-in-law (Note: Yang Yao was a younger brother of Yang Jun and thus an uncle of Emperor Wu's second empress Yang Zhi.)) Yang Yao (楊珧) and started reshuffling the various princes and their princedoms. As Sima Zhou was in Xu Province at the time, Emperor Wu enfeoffed him as the Prince of Langya (琅邪王) while at the same time allowing him to retain his original princedom in Dongguan; Sima Zhou's princedom thus comprised both the commanderies of Dongguan and Langya.

In late 279, Sima Zhou participated in the Jin dynasty's campaign against Eastern Wu and led thousands of troops to attack the Wu position at Tuzhong (塗中). In May 280, Sun Hao, the last Wu emperor, surrendered to the Jin dynasty. China was thus reunified under the Jin dynasty's rule. As a reward for Sima Zhou's contributions during the campaign, Emperor Wu enfeoffed two of Sima Zhou's sons as village marquises, each with a marquisate comprising 3,000 taxable households, in addition to granting him 6,000 rolls of silk. Some months later, Sima Zhou was reassigned to supervise military affairs in Qing Province and was given an additional appointment as Palace Attendant. He was subsequently promoted to General-in-Chief (大將軍) and allowed to set up his own administrative office.

When Sima Zhou became critically ill in 283, Emperor Wu bestowed several gifts on his family and even sent officials to visit him and enquire about his health. Sima Zhou died in June that year at the age of 57 (by East Asian age reckoning). Emperor Wu honoured him with the posthumous title "Prince Wu" (武王). Before his death, Sima Zhou had requested to be buried beside his mother Lady Fu after his death and for his princedom to be divided among his four sons: Sima Jin (司馬覲), Sima Dan (司馬澹), Sima Yao (司馬繇) and Sima Cui (司馬漼). Emperor Wu approved his request. Among Sima Zhou's four sons, the eldest, Sima Jin (father of Sima Rui), inherited his father's peerage as the Prince of Langya.

== See also ==
- Lists of people of the Three Kingdoms
