= Liang Shuo =

Chinese Jin dynasty official and rebel (died 323)

Liang Shuo (梁硕; died c.25 July 323) (Note: The annals of Emperor Ming in Book of Jin recorded that Liang Shuo was killed on the renzi day of the 6th month of the 1st year of the Tai'ning era. Yu Wenjun was made empress on the same day. Vol.92 of Zizhi Tongjian also recorded Liang's death after the record on Yu being made empress.) was a Chinese rebel leader and official during the Jin dynasty (266–420). He occupied Jiao Province from c.315 and nominally submitted to Wang Dun. However, about eight years later, he was defeated and executed through the efforts of Wang's subordinate Tao Kan.

== Life ==
=== First rebellion and submission ===
Liang Shuo's origins were not recorded. (Note: Given Liang's tendency to invite sons of previous Inspectors of Jiaozhou (Tao Wei and Xiu Zhan) to become his nominal supervisor, he was likely of humble origins and/or not a native of Jiaozhou.) His earliest appearance in historical records was as a subordinate of Gu Shou (顧壽; grandson of Gu Ti), governor of Jiao Province. How the conflict between the pair began differs according to the source. The Book of Jin recorded that Gu Shou's father Gu Mi was also a governor of Jiao Province. (Note: Gu Mi succeeded Wu Yan.) After Gu Mi's death, another son of Gu Mi, Gu Can (顧参), was forced by the people of Jiaozhou to take over his father's position; Gu Can died shortly after. Gu Can's younger brother Gu Shou then asked to become Inspector of Jiaozhou, but was initially rejected. After Gu Shou's insistence, the people of Jiaozhou relented. As Inspector, Gu Shou killed some officials including one Hu Zhao (胡肇), and wanted to kill Liang Shuo. Liang managed to escape, and raised an army to attack Gu Shou; Gu Shou was captured and poisoned. Liang then invited Tao Wei (who was then Administrator of Cangwu Commandery, a post Tao's father Tao Huang once held) to become Inspector of Jiaozhou. Like his father, Tao Wei was beloved by the people of Jiaozhou; he died after three years as Inspector of Jiaozhou. However, the Zizhi Tongjian indicated that Gu Shou directly succeeded his father as Inspector of Jiaozhou, and it was Liang Shuo who rose in rebellion and killed Gu Shou; Liang then became overall in-charge of Jiaozhou in c.315.

Around the same time, Wang Ji had already declared himself inspector in neighboring Guangzhou when Du Hong (杜弘), a subordinate of Du Tao, surrendered to him. The warlord Wang Dun, feeling that Wang Ji was difficult to control, decided to use Wang Ji and Du Hong to attack Liang Shuo; Dun then nominated Ji as Inspector of Jiaozhou. Liang then nominated Xiu Zhan (修湛; son of Xiu Ze [修则] (Note: Xiu Ze had a stint as Inspector of Jiaozhou under Eastern Wu; he was killed in battle against Jin general Mao Jiong in 268. Xiu Zhan's brother Xiu Yun was working alongside Tao Huang when he killed Mao Jiong; Yun's death in c.279 was one of the triggers for Guo Ma's rebellion.)) as his Inspector of Jiaozhou; the pair managed to repel Wang Ji, who then returned to Guangzhou together with Du Hong, Wen Shao (温卲) and Liu Shen (刘沈). Wang Dun then sent Tao Kan to pacify Guangzhou; Wang Ji died of illness during the pacification and Du Hong surrendered to Wang Dun. Liang Shuo and Xiu Zhan presumably submitted to Tao Kan and by extension, Wang Dun.

=== Second rebellion and death ===
The next mention of Liang Shuo was in 322, (Note: Wang Liang's biography in vol.89 of Jin Shu recorded that he was nominated by Wang Dun to be Inspector of Jiaozhou in the 3rd year of the Yongxing era of the reign of Emperor Hui of Jin (c.306). This was likely an error as at this point, Wu Yan was still Inspector of Jiaozhou.) where Wang Dun nominated Wang Liang (王谅) as Inspector of Jiaozhou; Dun also gave orders to Liang to arrest Xiu Zhan (who was then Inspector of Jiaozhou) and Liang Shuo (who was then Administrator of Xinchang) and execute the pair. Wang Liang first killed Xiu Zhan, (Note: Wang Liang's biography in Book of Jin recorded that when he reached Jiaozhou, Xiu Zhan had retreated to Jiuzhen. Tao Kan then sent an emissary which convinced Xiu to meet up with Wang. At the location of the meeting, Wang prevented Xiu's entourage from joining him, and arrested him. Liang Shuo, who was also at the meeting, advised Wang to spare Xiu; Wang refused. Angered, Liang then left the meeting.) which stirred Liang Shuo to rebel again. Liang eventually besieged Wang Liang at Long Biên in c.November, Although Liang eventually killed Wang in c.late June 323, he was in turn defeated and executed by Tao Kan's subordinate Gao Bao (Note: The Zizhi Tongjian recorded that Gao Bao was later killed by Ruan Fang (阮放), who successfully requested for the post of Inspector of Jiaozhou. Ruan invited Gao to a banquet, and men lying in ambush killed Gao. Gao's troops attacked Ruan Fang, forcing him to flee. Ruan was relieved of his post, but still journeyed to Jiaozhou; he died of illness shortly after reaching there.) (高宝) in July. His head was then sent to the Jin capital Jiankang.
