= Xu Miao =

Cao Wei politician (172-249)

- 徐邈

Household Counsellor (光祿大夫)
- In office ? – 249
- Monarch: Cao Fang

Colonel-Director of Retainers (司隸校尉)
- In office 240 – ?
- Monarch: Cao Fang

Minister of Finance (大司農)
- In office 240 – ?
- Monarch: Cao Fang

General Who Establishes Might (建威將軍)
- In office ?–?
- Monarch: Cao Rui / Cao Fang

Colonel Who Protects the Qiang (護羌校尉)
- In office 227 – ?
- Monarch: Cao Rui

Inspector of Liang Province (涼州刺史)
- In office 227 – ?
- Monarch: Cao Rui

Military Adviser to the Senior General Who Pacifies the Army (撫軍大將軍軍師)
- In office ?–?
- Monarch: Cao Pi

Personal details
- Born: 172 (Note: Xu Miao's biography in the Sanguozhi recorded that he died at the age of 78 (by East Asian age reckoning) in the 1st year of the Jiaping era (249–254) of Cao Fang's reign. By calculation, his year of birth should be 172.) Jizhou District, Tianjin
- Died: 249 (aged 77)
- Children: Xu Wu; Wang Jun's wife
- Occupation: Military general, politician
- Courtesy name: Jingshan (景山)
- Posthumous name: Marquis Mu (穆侯)
- Peerage: Marquis of a Chief Village (都亭侯)

Xu Miao (Note: not to be confused with the Eastern Jin official of the same name, who has a biography in vol.91 of Book of Jin. Sima Daozi's biography in the same work recorded that this Xu Miao's courtesy name was Xianmin (仙民).) (172–249), courtesy name Jingshan, was a Chinese military general and politician of the state of Cao Wei during the Three Kingdoms period of China. He started his career in the late Eastern Han dynasty under the warlord Cao Cao, who was the de facto head of the Han central government in that period. After the end of the Han dynasty in 220, Xu Miao served under Cao Cao's son and successor, Cao Pi, who established the Cao Wei state with himself as the emperor. He lived through the reigns of three Wei emperors – Cao Pi, Cao Rui and Cao Fang – and held various high offices in the Wei government.

== See also ==
- Lists of people of the Three Kingdoms
