= Battle of Xiling =

Battle between the states of Western Jin and Eastern Wu (272-273)

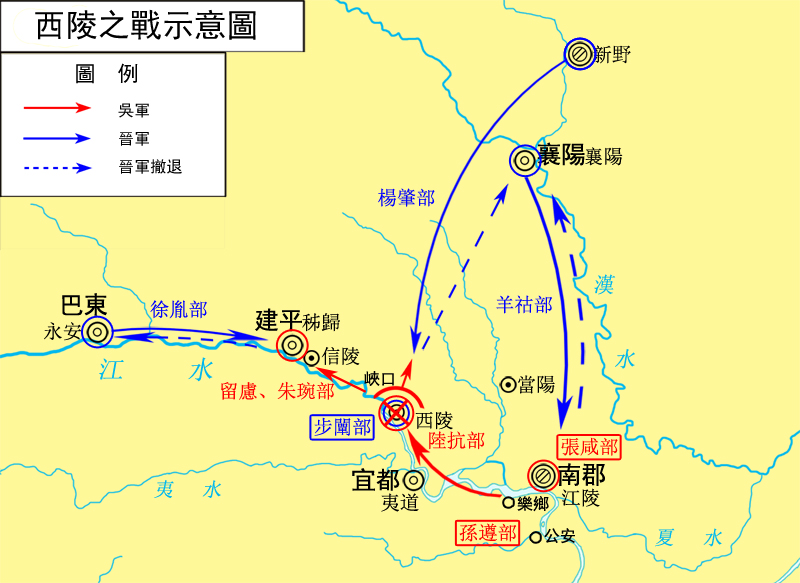
Date	October 272 – February 273
Location	Xiling District, Yichang, Hubei
Result	Eastern Wu victory

Belligerents
Eastern Wu	Western Jin

Commanders and leaders
Lu Kang	Bu Chan (executed); Yang Hu; Yang Zhao

Strength
30,000+	80,000+

Battle of Xiling
- Traditional Chinese: 西陵之戰
- Simplified Chinese: 西陵之战
Transcriptions
Standard Mandarin
- Hanyu Pinyin: Xīlíng Zhī Zhàn

The Battle of Xiling was fought between the states of Western Jin and Eastern Wu from October 272 to February 273 during the Three Kingdoms period of China. The battle concluded with a Wu victory.

== Background ==
During the Three Kingdoms period, the city of Xiling (西陵; present-day Xiling District, Yichang, Hubei) was held by Eastern Wu, and it was located near the border between Wu and its ally, Shu Han. In 229, Bu Zhi was appointed Commander of Xiling, where he would serve up to his death in 247. After he died, his son, Bu Chan, took over his role in Xiling. The Cao Wei state conquered Shu Han in 263; in 266, Wei was replaced by Western Jin. In 272, the Wu emperor, Sun Hao recalled Bu Chan to the capital to have him serve as the Controller of the Imperial Guards. However, because the Bu family had been in Xiling for many years, Bu Chan feared that he had been accused of not performing his duty well and that he was being recalled to be punished. Thus, Bu Chan defected to Jin, surrendering Xiling and sending his two nephews, Bu Ji (步璣) and Bu Xuan (步璿), to the Jin capital, Luoyang.

== The battle ==
=== Initial stage ===
When Wu's Senior General Who Guards the Army, Lu Kang received news of the revolt, he immediately ordered his subordinates Zuo Yi (左奕), Wu Yan, Cai Gong (蔡貢), and others to lead separate forces and head towards Xiling. He instructed his men to construct defensive structures from Chixi (赤谿) to Gushi (故市) to form an encirclement around Bu Chan's position, while at the same time defending the area from attacks by Jin forces. Hearing that Lu Kang was approaching Xiling, Jin sent the Chief Controller of Jing Province, Yang Hu to rescue Bu Chan.

While constructing the defences, many of Lu Kang's officers repeatedly urged him to attack Xiling but he refused, believing that the city was well-fortified. To prove that he was right, Lu Kang eventually relented and ordered an assault on Xiling. As he expected, they did not succeed in capturing the city, so his officers gave up their idea of attacking and complied with Lu Kang's orders to construct the defensive structures.

=== Destruction of the dyke near Jiangling ===
When Jin forces led by Yang Hu were approaching Jiangling County, the Wu officers advised Lu Kang against leaving Jiangling to attack Xiling. However, Lu Kang was confident that Jiangling was impregnable, and even if Jin were to capture it, they would not hold it for long. He was more concerned that if they lose Xiling, the tribes of the southern hills may rise up and cause trouble for Wu.

Jiangling was situated on flat lands and was a very accessible location. However, Lu Kang later ordered Zhang Xian (張咸) to oversee the construction of a large dyke to block the river's flow and direct its waters to flood the flat lands, to create a large body of water around the city to serve as a barrier to invaders. When Yang Hu arrived, he planned to make use of this barrier by transporting supplies on boats, but he spread false news that he intended to destroy the dyke to make way for his land army to pass through. When Lu Kang heard that, he saw through Yang Hu's plot and ordered Zhang Xian to destroy the dyke. When Yang Hu reached Dangyang (當陽; southwest of present-day Jingmen, Hubei), he was dismayed to hear that the dyke had been destroyed. He had no choice but to transport his supplies on land, resulting in the wasting of time and effort.

=== Final stages ===
Xu Yin (徐胤), the commander of the Jin garrison at Badong Commandery (巴東郡; around present-day Fengjie County, Chongqing), led naval forces towards Jianping (建平; around present-day Zigui County, Hubei), while Yang Zhao (楊肇), the Inspector of Jing Province (also under Jin control), led troops towards Xiling.

Lu Kang gave orders that: Zhang Xian reinforce Jiangling's defences; Sun Zun (孫遵), the Commandant of Gong'an County, patrol the south river bank and resist Yang Hu; and Liu Lü (留慮) and Zhu Wan (朱琬) guard against Xu Yin's attacks. He led three armies to hold off Yang Zhao with the aid of the defensive structures they had constructed earlier. However, Lu Kang's subordinates Zhu Qiao (朱喬) and Yu Zan (俞贊) defected to Yang Zhao's side. Lu Kang knew that Yu Zan was aware of the mutinous tribal soldiers in his army and may inform Yang Zhao about this weakness. Hence, that night, Lu Kang immediately replaced the tribal soldiers with other veteran soldiers whom he trusted more. The following day, as Lu Kang expected, Yang Zhao concentrated his attacks on the unit in Lu Kang's army which used to be made up of tribal soldiers, without knowing that they had been replaced. Lu Kang ordered his archers to retaliate, raining arrows on the enemy and inflicting heavy casualties.

After about a month, Yang Zhao failed to overcome Lu Kang, so he withdrew his army on one night. Lu Kang wanted to pursue the enemy but he was worried that Bu Chan (who was still inside Xiling) might use the opportunity to attack him from behind, and he did not have enough troops with him. He then ordered his men to beat the drums and pretend to prepare to attack Yang Zhao's retreating forces. When Yang Zhao's men saw that, they were so terrified that they abandoned their armour and equipment and fled. Lu Kang sent a small group of lightly armed soldiers to pursue Yang Zhao and they inflicted a crushing defeat on the enemy. Yang Hu and the other Jin generals withdrew their armies after receiving news of Yang Zhao's defeat. Lu Kang then attacked and conquered Xiling. Bu Chan, along with his family and high-ranking officers, were executed for treason, while the others, numbering over 10,000, were pardoned after Lu Kang requested the Wu court. Lu Kang then had Xiling's fortifications repaired before returning east to Lexiang (樂鄉; east of present-day Songzi, Hubei).

== Aftermath ==
After Lu Kang returned to Lexiang, he was promoted to Protectorate General. Meanwhile, Yang Hu was demoted to General Who Pacifies the South, while Yang Zhao was made a commoner. For the next few years, Yang Hu shifted his focus to winning Wu's hearts by having him and his soldiers conduct themselves more respectfully towards their enemies. Historical records tell of an uncanny friendship between Yang Hu and Lu Kang after their battle at Xiling. Following Lu Kang's death in 274, Yang Hu began strongly advocating for Jin to carry out the conquest of Wu, which began five years later in late 279.

The battle is briefly mentioned in chapter 120 of Luo Guanzhong's 14th century historical novel, Romance of the Three Kingdoms.
