= Zhuge Jing =

3rd century Eastern Wu general and politician

- 諸葛靚

General of the Right (右將軍)
- In office ?–?
- Monarch: Sun Xiu/Sun Hao

Grand Marshal (大司馬)
- In office ? – 1 May 280
- Monarch: Sun Hao

Personal details
- Born: Before 257 Yinan County, Shandong
- Died: After 284 (Note: Jing's younger son Hui was born in 284 and was not noted to be a posthumous son.)
- Relations: Sima Zhou's wife (elder sister); Wang Guang's wife (sister)
- Children: Zhuge Hui; Zhuge Yi
- Parent: Zhuge Dan (father)
- Occupation: Military general, politician
- Courtesy name: Zhongsi (仲思)

Zhuge Jing (fl. 257-284), courtesy name Zhongsi, was a Chinese military general and politician of Eastern Wu during the Three Kingdoms period of China. Though originally from Cao Wei, he was sent to Wu as a hostage during the rebellion of his father, Zhuge Dan, in 257. After his father's death in April 258, Zhuge Jing continued to stay in Wu where he served as a general until the state's demise in May 280 which ended the Three Kingdoms.

== Life ==
=== Zhuge Dan's Rebellion ===
Not much is known of Zhuge Jing's early life apart from his family being from Yangdu County (present-day Yishui, Shandong Province), Langya Commandery. His father, Zhuge Dan, held important appointments in the Wei government and was involved in putting down major rebellions against Wei in 251 and 255. However, as his close associates were purged by the paramount Sima clan, he became fearful of his position and rebelled at Shouchun in 257. To ensure an alliance with Wei's rival, Eastern Wu, Dan sent Jing to Wu's capital at Jianye as a hostage.

Dan's rebellion came to an end in 258 when he was slain by the general Hu Fen. Zhuge Jing's family was exterminated as punishment for Dan's insurrection, although one of his sisters was spared due to her marriage to Sima Yi's son, Sima Zhou. Zhuge Jing did not return to Wei and instead remained in Wu, where he served as an officer in his new state. There, he grew to the position General of the Right (右將軍) and grand marshal (大司馬).

=== Shi Dan's revolt ===
In 264, Sun Hao ascended the throne in Wu, and by February 266, the state of Shu Han was conquered and Wei was replaced by the Sima Jin Dynasty. In 265, Sun Hao moved the capital from Jianye to Wuchang. As Sun Hao moved to Wuchang, he left Zhuge Jing and another general, Ding Gu (丁固), to defend Jianye.

In November to December 266, seeing Sun Hao's absent from Jianye, a bandit named Shi Dan (施但) took the opportunity to kidnap Sun Hao's brother Sun Qian (孫謙), hoping to install him as the new emperor. He then rebelled and gathered 10,000 men under his wing before making his way to Jianye. When Shi Dan arrived at the old capital, he sent an envoy to Zhuge Jing inviting him to join his revolt. However, Jing beheaded the envoy, and together with Ding Gu, went out to battle Shi Dan at Niutun (牛屯; southeast of present-day Nanjing, Jiangsu). Shi Dan's men were poorly armoured, so they were easily defeated and scattered. Sun Qian was rescued by the generals, but Sun Hao executed him as he thought Qian was a willing conspirator in the revolt.

=== Battle of Hefei (268) ===
In December 268 or January 269, Zhuge Jing and Wu's grand marshal Ding Feng marched from Que Slope (芍陂; south of present-day Shou County, Anhui) and attacked Jin at Hefei, which was defended by Shi Bao. However, they were defeated by reinforcements led by Sima Jun. Ding Feng exchanged letters with Shi Bao regarding trivial matters, and after compromising, both sides retreated.

=== Conquest of Wu ===
At the end of 279, Emperor Wu of Jin launched a full-scaled invasion on Wu. As Jin forces advanced towards the capital in Jianye, Zhuge Jing with Shen Ying (沈瑩) and Sun Zhen (孫震), under the command of the Wu Chancellor Zhang Ti headed out with 30,000 men to repel the Jin commander, Wang Hun. They besieged Wang Hun's subordinate, Zhang Qiao (張喬), at Yanghe (杨荷; north of present-day He County, Anhui), who surrendered due to being outnumbered. Zhuge Jing advised Zhang Ti to execute Zhang Qiao and his men, as he believed that Zhang was only waiting for Jin reinforcements to arrive. Zhang Ti ignored his warnings and continued towards Wang Hun. The Wu forces then fought against the Jin Provisional Governor of Yangzhou, Zhou Jun (周浚), but this time, they were repelled. As they retreated, the Jin generals pursued and attacked them. As Jing had predicted, Zhang Qiao then rebelled, and the Jin forces decimated Wu at Banqiao (版橋; south of present-day He County, Anhui).

Zhuge Jing broke out with a few hundred men before returning to find Zhang Ti. Once finding him, Jing tried convincing Zhang Ti to flee, but he was determined to stay and die fighting. Jing attempted to pull him away from the scene, but without success. In the end, he wept and left without Zhang Ti. It was said that after moving a hundred pace, he looked back and saw that Jin soldiers had already killed Zhang Ti. Later, Zhuge Jing and his colleague, Sun Yi (孫奕), surrendered to Sima Zhou.

=== Life after the fall of Wu ===
After Wu capitulated in May 280, Sun Hao and some former Wu officials, including Zhuge Jing, were relocated to Luoyang. Emperor Wu was a childhood friend of Zhuge Jing and wanted to get in touch with him. However, Zhuge Jing still bore a grudge against the Sima clan for the death of his family members and refused to meet him.

According to a story from A New Account of the Tales of the World, the emperor, knowing that his uncle Sima Zhou was married to Jing's elder sister, decided to visit their home to find Jing. When Jing heard of the emperor's arrival, he attempted to hide in the lavatory but was eventually discovered by Emperor Wu. The emperor spoke to him, "Today, we finally meet each other again," to which Jing replied tearfully, "I regret not being able to cover my body in paint and remove the skin from my face before I meet Your Majesty again!", alluding to the stories of Yu Rang and Nie Zheng. Emperor Wu then left the home in shame. (Note: A similar story was also recorded in the biography of Jing's son Hui in Book of Jin.)

Emperor Wu offered Zhuge Jing the appointment of grand marshal and later Palace Attendant but, on both occasions, Jing refused. He returned to his hometown to live the rest of his life as a commoner. Until his death, it is said that he never sat facing the direction of Luoyang due to his grudge. He had at least two sons who both served in the Jin government.

- Zhuge Yi (諸葛頤), the elder son, was favoured by Emperor Yuan.
- Zhuge Hui (诸葛恢; 284 - 25 June 345), the younger son, was eventually named by Emperor Cheng as one of the officials to assist Cheng's successor Emperor Kang.

== Anecdote ==
=== Conversation with Sun Hao ===
Sun Hao once asked Zhuge Jing in court, "Gracious minister, since your courtesy name is Zhongsi, what are you thinking about?" Zhuge Jing answered, "When at home I think of filial piety; when serving the sovereign I think of devotion; when with friends I think of trust; that's all there is to think about."

== In Romance of the Three Kingdoms ==
Zhuge Jing appears as a minor character in Luo Guanzhong's 14th century historical novel, Romance of the Three Kingdoms, which romanticizes the events before and during the Three Kingdoms period. He appears in the final chapter of the novel, Chapter 120, which covers the Conquest of Wu by Jin. He and Shen Ying followed Zhang Ti to resist the invading Jin forces at Niuzhu (牛渚; in present day, Ma'anshan, Anhui). As Jin marched into Wu with little difficulty, Zhang Ti sent the two generals to check on the enemy advances. When reports of a strong Jin army arriving reached the generals, the two rushed in a panic to inform Zhang Ti about the situation. Jing was convinced that Wu was lost and urged Zhang Ti to flee. After his proposal was rejected, he wept and left Zhang Ti and Shen Ying to their fate.
