= Guo Ma =

Late 3rd century Eastern Wu general and rebel

- 郭馬

General Who Pacifies the South (安南将军) (self-appointed)
- In office 279 – ?

Personal details
- Born: Unknown
- Died: Unknown

Guo Ma (fl. 279) was a military general of Eastern Wu during the Three Kingdoms period. In 279, Guo and his colleagues rebelled in Guangzhou following the death of their superior, Xiu Yun (修允/脩允). His rebellion later coincided with the Conquest of Wu by Jin, and was one of the last conflicts of the Three Kingdoms.

== Life ==
Nothing is known about Guo Ma's background, but he had been a long time subordinate of the Administrator of Hepu, Xiu Yun (son of Xiu Ze), (Note: Xiu Yun's brother Xiu Zhan would later be invited by Liang Shuo to become his Inspector of Jiaozhou in c.315.) serving as his General-Commander. (Note: It is probable, but not certain, that Guo took part in the Jiao Province Campaign alongside Xiu or his father.) In the summer of 279, (Note: The Chinese year 279 has 13 months and lasts from 30 Jan 279 to 18 Feb 280 in the Julian calendar.) Xiu was made Administrator of Guilin and was meant to move to his new base of operation. However, Xiu was too ill that time, so he remained in Hepu and gave Guo Ma a small army of 500 to lead in Guilin in order to calm the local tribes. Xiu died soon after, and his subordinates were split up to serve under the other commanders.

Guo Ma and his peers were not happy with this decision. They had served the Xiu family for generations and were reluctant to serve separately in different armies. Coincidentally, the Wu emperor Sun Hao had been conducting a household survey in the Guangzhou region around the time of Xiu's death, putting the people at unease. Using this to their advantage, Guo Ma and his companions riled up the people and mobilized the local troops, amassing a huge army under them to rebel.

Guo attacked the Commander of Guangzhou, Yu Shou (虞授) and killed him. Wang Zhu (王著) and Wang Yan (王延), who were brothers of the mathematician Wang Fan, were also killed in the revolt. Guo then appointed himself Chief Controller of Jiaozhou and Guangzhou along with General Who Pacifies the South. He appointed his fellow generals, Wu Shu (吳述) and Yin Xing (殷興), as Inspector of Guangzhou and Prefect of Nanhai respectively.

Guo then ordered He Dian (何典) to attack Cangwu and Wang Zu (王族) to attack Shixing. Wu's Prefect of Nanhai, Liu Lüe (劉略) (Note: Qing-era scholar Zhao Yiqing (赵一清) believed that this was the same person as the son of Liu Zan with a similar-sounding name.) of Kuaiji, was killed by Guo and the Inspector of Guangzhou, Xu Qi (徐旗), was driven out of the province. The newly appointed Governor of Guangzhou, Teng Xiu, led 10,000 men under his wing to quell the rebellion from the east in c.October. (Note: The 8th month of that year corresponds to 23 Sep to 22 Oct 279 in the Julian calendar.) Sun Hao also gave the Commander of Xuling (徐陵, in modern-day Jingkou District, Jiangsu), Tao Jun, 7,000 men to lead from the west. Jun was expected to link up with the Governor of Jiaozhou, his elder brother Tao Huang, and attack the rebels together.

The rebellion carried over to December of that year, the same month in which Wu's rival, the Jin dynasty (266–420), would launch a large-scale invasion on them. (Note: It is unknown if Jin was aware of Guo Ma's rebellion.) Tao Jun had marched all the way to Wuchang when he heard the news, so he quickly rush back east to fend off the invasion but was defeated by the Jin forces. Teng Xiu was still fighting the rebels at the time before he knew of the invasion. Much like Tao Jun, he abandoned the campaign to defend against the invasion, but Teng was faced with complications along the way and never reached the frontline.

In May 280, Sun Hao surrendered to Jin, thus ending Eastern Wu and the Three Kingdoms period. Teng Xiu and Tao Huang both surrendered to Jin while Tao Jun's fate is unknown. Available historical records all fail to provide a conclusion to the rebellion although it most likely ended shortly after Jin's takeover. (Note: Vol.81 of Zizhi Tongjian recorded that a general amnesty was declared on the yiyou day of the 4th month of the 1st year of the Taikang era; this corresponds to 13 Jun 280 in the Julian calendar and was just over a month after Sun Hao's surrender. It is probable that Guo Ma and his fellow rebels took this opportunity to surrender.) Guo Ma also ceases to appear in the records from this point on and has no recorded time of death. Following their surrender, Teng Xiu and Tao Huang were reinstated to their original positions in Guangzhou and Jiaozhou respectively. Teng Xiu's biography in Book of Jin also did not record any rebellions in Guangzhou from his surrender to Jin to his death in 288.

Lu Ji, son of Lu Kang and a writer who lived through the fall of Wu and served in the Jin government, claimed in an essay of his, Disquisition on the Fall of a State (辨亡論), that Guo Ma's rebellion (which he referred to as "the chaos in Guangzhou") was one of the many reasons for Wu's demise. Guo Ma and his rebellion do not appear in Luo Guanzhong's 14th-century historical novel Romance of the Three Kingdoms.
