= Yunmeng County =

Yunmeng County 云梦县
- County
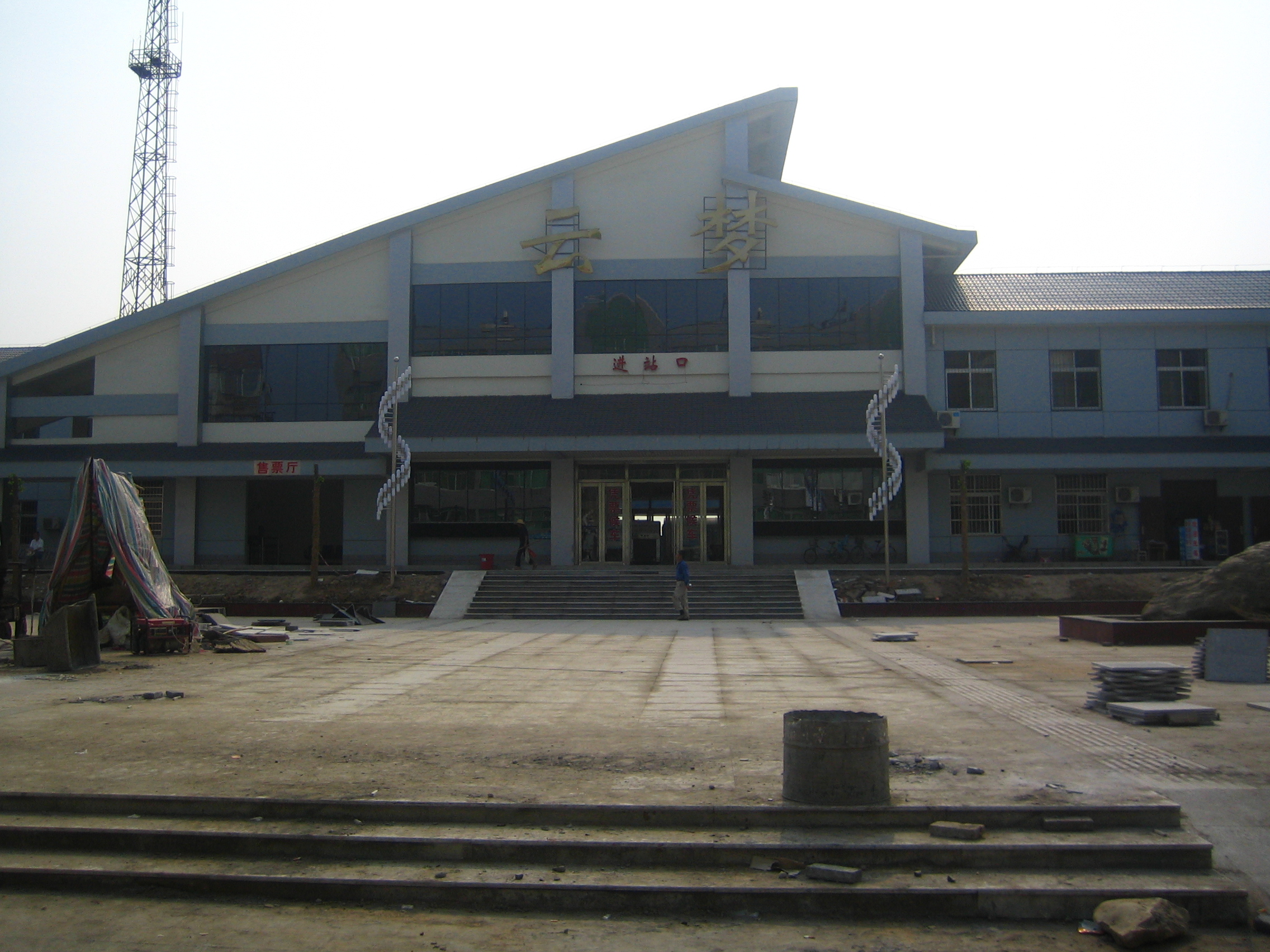
- Yunmeng railway station

- Location of the seat in Hubei
- Coordinates (Yunmeng government): 31°01′16″N 113°45′14″E
- Country: People's Republic of China
- Province: Hubei
- Prefecture-level city: Xiaogan

Population (2020)
  - Total: 434,124
- Time zone: UTC+8 (China Standard)
- Postal code: 432500
- Website: www.yunmeng.gov.cn

Yunmeng County (simplified Chinese: 云梦县; traditional Chinese: 雲夢縣; pinyin: Yúnmèng Xiàn) is a county in eastern Hubei province, People's Republic of China. It is administered by Xiaogan City and is located just outside Xiaogan's urban area.

== History ==
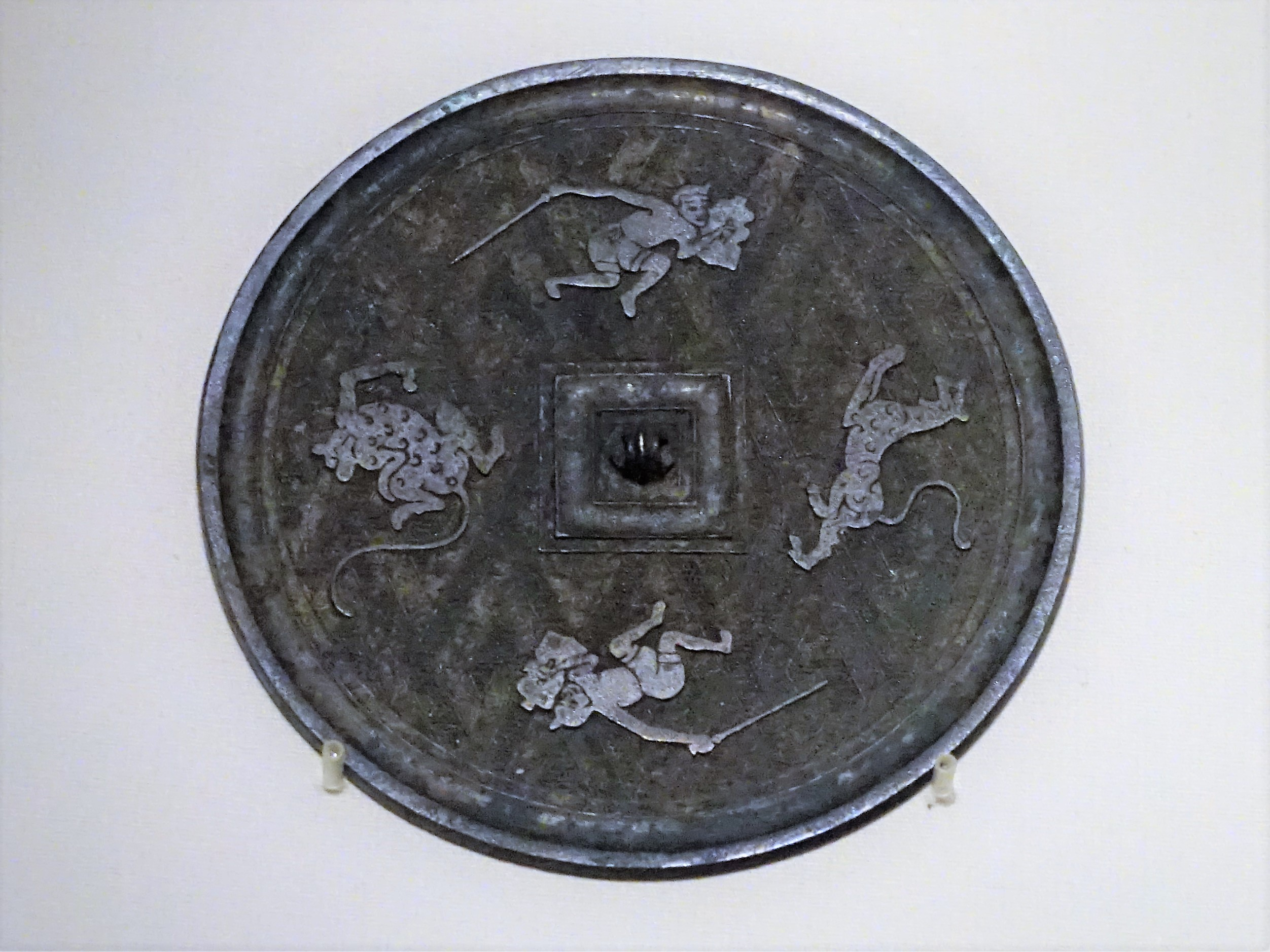
Bronze Mirror unearthed in Shuihudi, Yunmeng

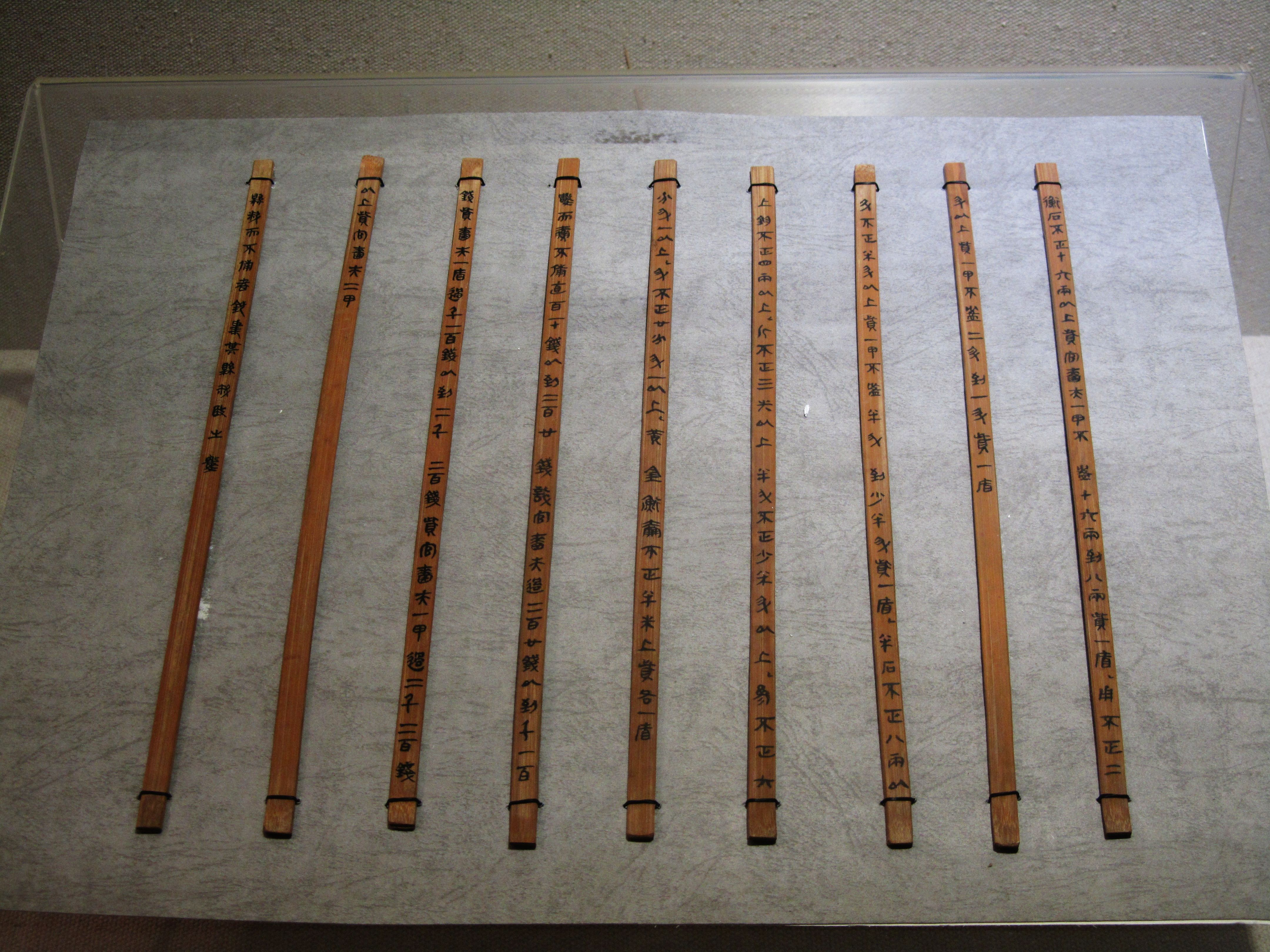
Qin dynasty Bamboo Slips unearthed in Shuihudi, Yunmeng in 1975

During the Spring and Autumn period of Chinese history (770-476 BCE), Yunmeng County formed part of the Zhou dynasty vassal State of Yun, later annexed by the State of Chu whose kings used the area as a hunting ground. After Chu's defeat at the hands of the State of Qin in 223 BCE, Yunmeng became part of Qin territory. Legend suggests that China's first emperor Qin Shi Huang visited the county in 219 BCE. Yunmeng was the location of the Jiangxia Commandery of the Han dynasty and the cradle of the Chinese Huang Clan.

== Administrative divisions ==
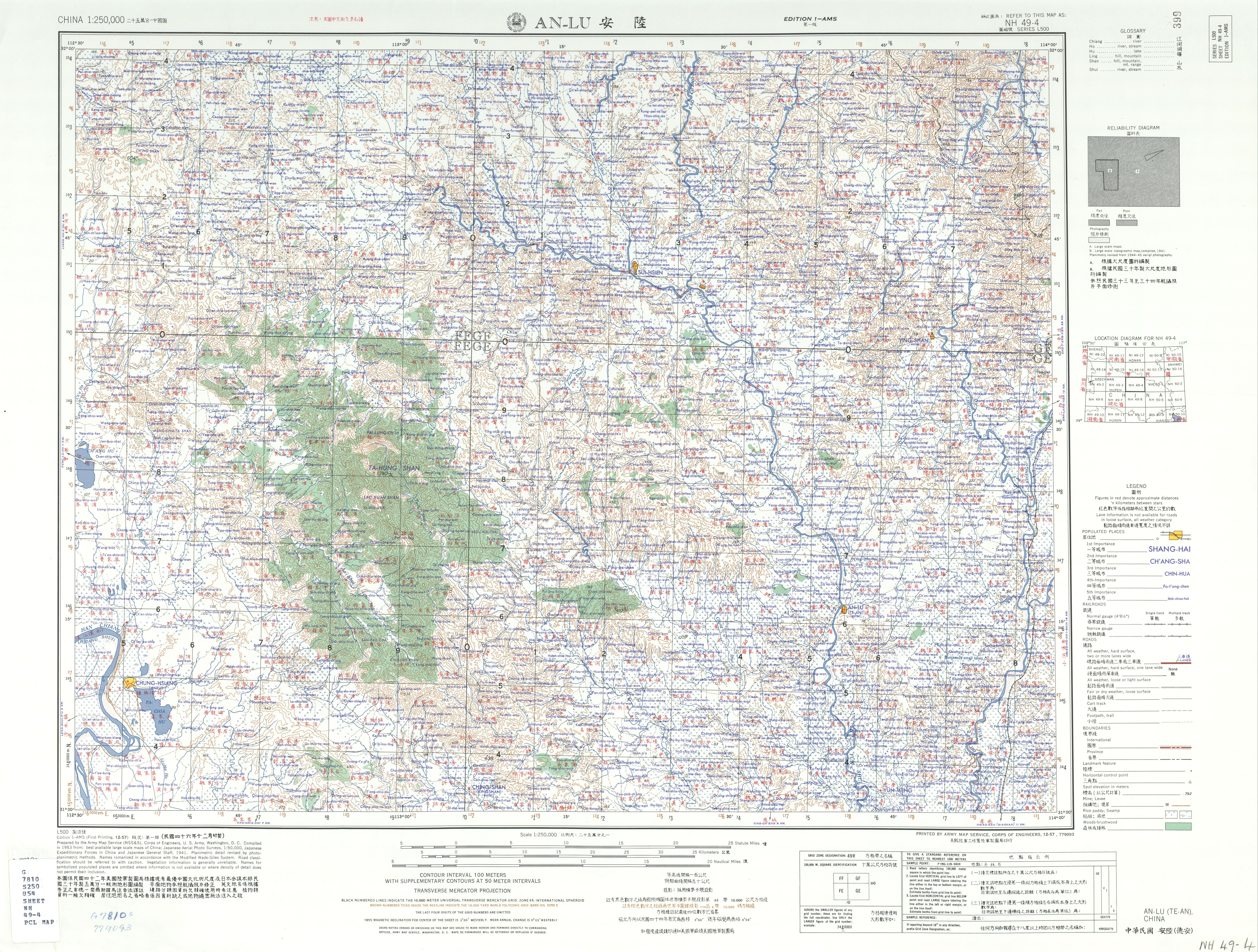
Map including Yunmeng (labeled as YÜN-MENG 雲夢) (1953)

Towns:

- Chengguan (城关镇), Yitang (义堂镇), Zengdian (曾店镇), Wupu (吴铺镇), Wuluo (伍洛镇), Xiaxindian (下辛店镇), Daoqiao (道桥镇), Geputan (隔蒲潭镇), Hujindian (胡金店镇)

Townships:

- Daodian Township (倒店乡), Shahe Township (沙河乡), Qingminghe Township (清明河乡)

Other town-level area:

- Yunmeng County Economic Development Area (云梦县经济开发区)

== Climate ==
Climate data for Yunmeng, elevation 32 m (105 ft), (1991–2020 normals, extremes 1981–present)
Month	Jan	Feb	Mar	Apr	May	Jun	Jul	Aug	Sep	Oct	Nov	Dec	Year
Record high °C (°F)	19.2 (66.6)	27.0 (80.6)	32.4 (90.3)	33.3 (91.9)	36.2 (97.2)	36.6 (97.9)	38.3 (100.9)	38.6 (101.5)	37.0 (98.6)	34.4 (93.9)	28.6 (83.5)	21.2 (70.2)	38.6 (101.5)
Mean daily maximum °C (°F)	8.0 (46.4)	11.1 (52.0)	16.0 (60.8)	22.5 (72.5)	27.1 (80.8)	30.0 (86.0)	32.5 (90.5)	32.4 (90.3)	28.8 (83.8)	23.2 (73.8)	16.8 (62.2)	10.4 (50.7)	21.6 (70.8)
Daily mean °C (°F)	3.7 (38.7)	6.5 (43.7)	11.2 (52.2)	17.3 (63.1)	22.4 (72.3)	25.9 (78.6)	28.5 (83.3)	27.8 (82.0)	23.6 (74.5)	17.9 (64.2)	11.6 (52.9)	5.7 (42.3)	16.8 (62.3)
Mean daily minimum °C (°F)	0.5 (32.9)	2.9 (37.2)	7.2 (45.0)	12.9 (55.2)	18.2 (64.8)	22.4 (72.3)	25.2 (77.4)	24.3 (75.7)	19.8 (67.6)	13.9 (57.0)	7.6 (45.7)	2.1 (35.8)	13.1 (55.6)
Record low °C (°F)	−11.0 (12.2)	−8.0 (17.6)	−3.5 (25.7)	0.0 (32.0)	7.9 (46.2)	12.3 (54.1)	18.6 (65.5)	15.6 (60.1)	10.7 (51.3)	1.4 (34.5)	−3.5 (25.7)	−13.0 (8.6)	−13.0 (8.6)
Average precipitation mm (inches)	38.2 (1.50)	46.3 (1.82)	68.3 (2.69)	107.0 (4.21)	135.7 (5.34)	178.6 (7.03)	201.3 (7.93)	119.2 (4.69)	68.2 (2.69)	62.9 (2.48)	47.6 (1.87)	23.1 (0.91)	1,096.4 (43.16)
Average precipitation days (≥ 0.1 mm)	7.9	9.3	10.9	10.5	11.7	10.6	10.5	9.5	7.5	9.0	8.4	6.9	112.7
Average snowy days	4.2	2.3	0.9	0	0	0	0	0	0	0	0.4	1.3	9.1
Average relative humidity (%)	74	75	75	75	76	81	82	81	77	75	75	73	77
Mean monthly sunshine hours	96.7	94.8	125.7	152.5	167.2	158.1	206.8	211.9	161.8	144.6	123.4	112.5	1,756
Percentage possible sunshine	30	30	34	39	39	37	48	52	44	41	39	36	39
Source: China Meteorological Administration

== Culture ==
Yumian (Chinese: 鱼面; lit. 'fish noodle'), is a local specialty noodle made with flour and carp or black carp from the Fu River in Yunmeng. Yunmeng Yumian was awarded silver medal of The first Panama–Pacific International Exposition in 1915.

== Notable people ==
- Dou Ziwen (斗子文)
- Huang Xiang (黄香)
- Zhao Fu (赵复)
- Zou Guanguang (邹观光)
- Xu Zhaochun (许兆椿)
- Wu Luzhen (吴禄贞)
