= Wang Jun (Jin dynasty) =

Chinese Jin Dynasty general (206–286)

- 王濬
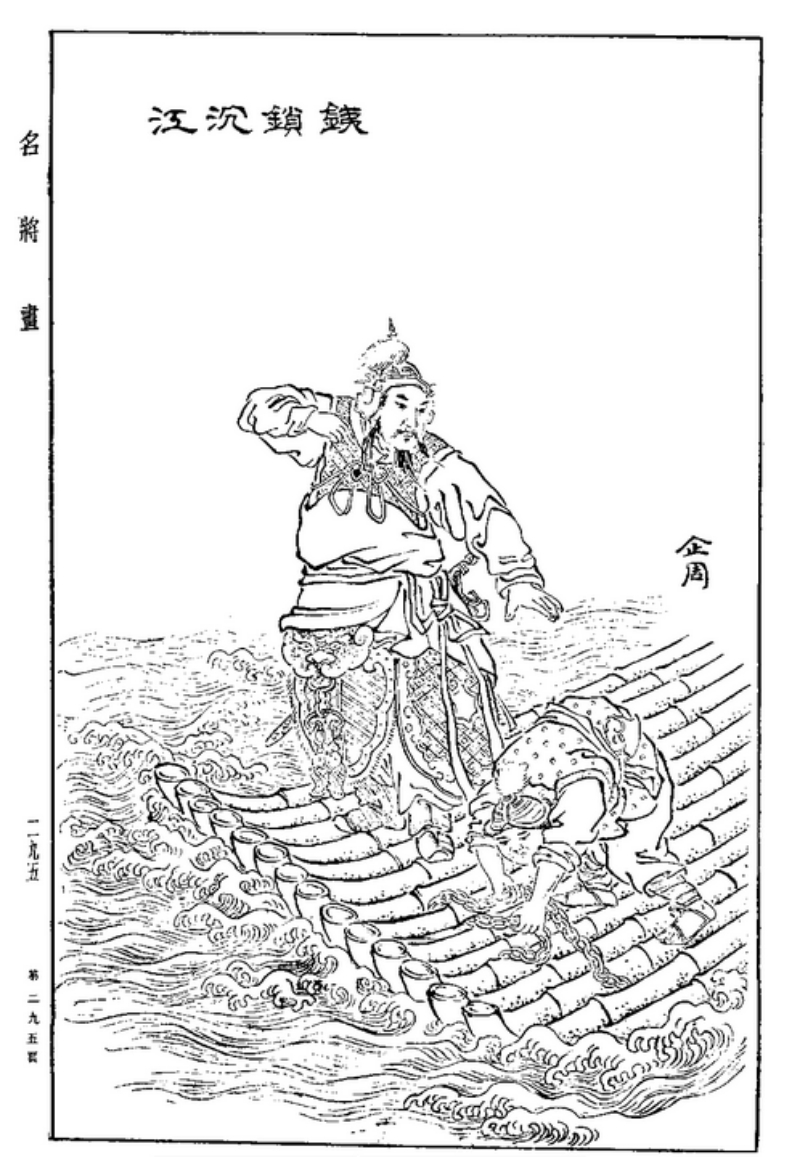

Senior General Who Pacifies the Army (撫軍大將軍)
- In office 16 September 285 - 28 January 286
- Monarch: Emperor Wu of Jin

Regular Mounted Attendant (散騎常侍)
- In office ? – 286
- Monarch: Emperor Wu of Jin

Senior General Who Guards the Army (鎮軍大將軍)
- In office ? – 286
- Monarch: Emperor Wu of Jin

Prancing Dragon General (龍驤將軍)
- In office 279 – ?
- Monarch: Emperor Wu of Jin

Inspector of Yi Province (益州刺史)
- In office 272 – 279
- Monarch: Emperor Wu of Jin

Administrator of Guanghan (廣漢太守)
- In office 272
- Monarch: Emperor Wu of Jin

Personal details
- Born: 206 Lingbao, Henan
- Died: 28 January 286 (aged 79)
- Resting place: Changzhi, Shanxi
- Spouse: Xu Miao's daughter
- Children: Wang Ju; Wang Chang
- Occupation: Military general, politician
- Courtesy name: Shizhi (士治)
- Posthumous name: Marquis Wu (武侯)
- Peerage: Marquis of Xiangyang (襄陽侯)
- Other name(s): Atong (阿童) (childhood name)

Wang Jun (206 – 28 January 286), courtesy name Shizhi, was a Chinese military general and politician who lived during the late Three Kingdoms period and early Western Jin dynasty of China.

== Life ==
Wang Jun was from Hu County (湖縣), Hongnong Commandery (弘農郡), which is located west of present-day Lingbao, Henan. He was born in a family of government officials. He was known for his good looks, and for being well-read and ambitious. He started his career as an Assistant Officer (從事) in the office of Hedong Commandery (河東郡; around present-day Xia County, Shanxi).

Yang Ji (羊暨), a nephew of the Jin dynasty general Yang Hu, once told his uncle to be wary of Wang Jun because he was extravagant and unbridled in his ways. However, Yang Hu recognised Wang Jun as a rare talent and regarded him highly. In 272, after Wang Jun was appointed as the Administrator (太守) of Guanghan Commandery (廣漢郡; around present-day Guanghan, Sichuan), Yang Hu further recommended him to be the Inspector (刺史) of Yi Province (covering present-day Sichuan and Chongqing). During this time, Emperor Wu ordered him to supervise the construction of large battleships, each decorated with images of ferocious beasts and capable of holding 2,000 or more soldiers. The battleships were meant for use in a campaign against the Jin dynasty's rival state, Eastern Wu.

In 279, Wang Jun wrote a memorial to Emperor Wu, requesting that he order a military campaign against Eastern Wu. The emperor agreed, appointed Wang Jun as Prancing Dragon General (龍驤將軍) and ordered him to lead troops from Yi Province's capital, Chengdu, to invade Eastern Wu. Wang Jun and his army conquered strategic locations in Wu territory such as Xiling (西陵; in present-day Yichang, Hubei), Xiakou (夏口; present-day Hankou, Hubei) and Wuchang (武昌; present-day Ezhou, Hubei). When the Jin invasion forces reached the Wu capital Jianye, the last Wu emperor Sun Hao surrendered, thus bringing an end to the conquest of Wu.

Although Wang Jun had made great achievements in the campaign, another general Wang Hun (王渾) slandered him in front of Emperor Wu, so he did not receive due recognition for his contributions. When Wang Jun wanted to seek redress for his grievances, his subordinate Fan Tong (范通) advised him against it, saying that it would be unwise to do so. Later, the official Li Mi (李密) spoke up for Wang Jun in front of Emperor Wu, who realised that he had treated Wang Jun unfairly earlier on. Emperor Wu then promoted Wang Jun to Senior General Who Guards the Army (鎮軍大將軍) and gave him an additional appointment as a Regular Mounted Attendant (散騎常侍). He also enfeoffed Wang Jun as the Marquis of Xiangyang (襄陽侯) in June or July 280. (Note: Both Emperor Wu's biography in Jin Shu and vol.81 of Zizhi Tongjian recorded that Wang Jun was made Marquis of Xiangyang on the geng'chen day of the 5th month of the 1st year of the Tai'kang era. However, there was no geng'chen day in that month; the month corresponds to 15 Jun to 13 Jul 280 in the Julian calendar.)

Wang Jun became more arrogant and extravagant in his lifestyle as he entered old age. On 16 September 285, he was reassigned to be Senior General Who Pacifies the Army (撫軍大將軍). However, he died in January 286 and was buried at Mount Baigu (柏谷山) near present-day Changzhi, Shanxi. Emperor Wu honoured him with the posthumous title "Marquis Wu" (武侯).

== Family ==
Wang Jun married Xu Miao's daughter. He had at least two sons: Wang Ju (王矩) and Wang Chang (王暢). Wang Ju inherited his father's peerage as the Marquis of Xiangyang, while Wang Chang served as a Mounted Gentleman (散騎郎) in the Jin government. Wang Chang's son, Wang Cui (王粹), married a Jin dynasty princess, Princess Yingchuan (潁川公主), and served as the Administrator of Wei Commandery (魏郡太守); Wang Cui was killed by Shi Le on 7 December 308.

== See also ==
- Lists of people of the Three Kingdoms
