= Tao Huang (general) =

Chinese military officer and official (died c.290)

- 陶璜

Inspector of Jiaozhou (交州刺史)
- In office c. 271 – 290
- Monarch: Sun Hao / Emperor Wu of Jin / Emperor Hui of Jin

Personal details
- Born: Unknown
- Died: c.290 (Note: Qing-era scholar Wan Sitong (万斯同) gave this year of death for Tao Huang in his Jin Fangzhen Nianbiao (晋方镇年表); Wu Tingxie (吴廷燮) agreed with Wan in the Jin portion of his Lidai Fangzhen Nianbiao (历代方镇年表). Tao Huang's biography in Book of Jin only recorded that he served in Jiaozhou for about 30 years, which is likely exaggerated, given the hagiographic assessment of his administration.)
- Relations: Tao Jun (陶濬; younger brother); Tao Kang (陶抗; younger brother); Tao Hui (陶回; 286-336; (Note: Tao Hui's biography in Book of Jin recorded that he died at the age of 51 (by East Asian reckoning) around the 2nd year of the Xianhe era of Emperor Cheng's reign (327 in the Julian calendar). However, the same biography recorded that Tao Hui took part in putting down Su Jun's rebellion (which broke out in late 327); an anecdote recorded in the same biography involving him and Wang Dao was dated by Zizhi Tongjian to the 1st year of the Xiankang era (335 in the Julian calendar). Thus, it is more likely that Tao Hui died in the 2nd year of the Xiankang era.) nephew and son of Tao Kang); Tao Sui (陶绥) (grandson; son of Tao Shu) (Note: Tao Huang's biography in Book of Jin noted that from Tao Huang's father Tao Ji to his grandson Tao Sui, a total of five members of the Tao clan across four generations had served as Inspector of Jiaozhou (Tao Ji, Tao Huang, Tao Wei, Tao Shu and Tao Sui).)
- Children: Tao Wei (陶威) (Note: Tao Wei eventually became Inspector of Jiaozhou after Wu Yan's death. After Wu Yan’s death, the office of Inspector of Jiaozhou was held by Gu Mi (顧秘; son of Gu Ti), then Gu Can (顧參; son of Gu Mi), and then Gu Shou (顧壽; younger brother of Gu Can). As Inspector of Jiaozhou, Gu Shou killed some officials including one Hu Zhao, and wanted to kill Liang Shuo. Liang managed to escape, and raised an army to attack Gu Shou. Gu was captured and poisoned. Liang then invited Tao Wei (who was then Administrator of Cangwu, a post Tao Huang once held) to become Inspector of Jiaozhou. Like his father, Tao Wei was beloved by the people of Jiaozhou. However, he died after three years as Inspector of Jiaozhou.) (Note: Tao Wei's name was erroneously recorded as "Tao Xian" (陶咸) in Wang Liang's (王谅) biography in vol.89 of Book of Jin; the biography also erroneously recorded that Tao had become Inspector of Jiaozhou and died before the 3rd year of the Yongxing era of the reign of Emperor Hui of Jin (c.306). At this point, Wu Yan was still Inspector of Jiaozhou.); Tao Shu (陶淑); Tao Rong
- Parent: Tao Ji (father)
- Occupation: Military general, politician
- Courtesy name: Shiying (世英)
- Posthumous name: Marquis Lie (烈侯)

Tao Huang (died c.290), courtesy name Shiying, posthumously known as Marquis Lie of Wanling (宛陵烈侯), was a Chinese military general and politician in Eastern Wu during the Three Kingdoms period and later for the Jin dynasty (266–420). Tao Huang was most notable for his administration of Jiaozhou for more than twenty years, during the Eastern Wu and Western Jin eras. He was also responsible for Wu's victory against Jin in Jiao between 268 and 271, one of the few major victories Wu had over Jin in the final years of the Three Kingdoms.

== Service in Eastern Wu ==
=== Jiao Province Campaign ===
Tao Huang was from Moling County, Daling commandery. His father, Tao Ji (陶基) was once the Inspector of Jiao province, and Tao Huang himself held high positions in the Wu government.

In 263, the people of Jiaozhi commandery in Jiao province led by Lã Hưng (呂興; Lü Xing) rebelled against Wu and aligned themselves with Wu's rival state, Cao Wei. By 268, the Sima Jin dynasty (which replaced Wei in February 266) consolidated their control over Jiaozhi and Jiuzhen commanderies and vied to take Rinan. In 269, the Wu emperor, Sun Hao launched a second counteroffensive to drive Jin out of Jiaozhou. Tao Huang (then Administrator of Cangwu), Xue Xu and Yu Si marched from Jing province to Hepu to attack Jin.

After reaching Hepu, Tao Huang volunteered to attack Jin's Prefect of Jiaozhi, Yang Ji at the Fen River (分水). Unfortunately, a portion of his army that was to arrive by sea did not arrive, as deserters who feared to fight the Jin force took control of that army and returned home instead. Seeing this, Tao Huang suggested calling off the attack. Still Xue Xu, likely out of thinking they had to turn the tide of the campaign or lose the province, advanced against Yang Ji. He was defeated by Yang Ji and lost two generals in the battle. Xue Xu was furious at Tao Huang, saying it was at first his idea to attack and considered abandoning the province. Tao Huang responded to Xue Xu, "I was not allowed to do what I wanted, and our armies refuse to cooperate with each other. That was why we lost the battle." Later that night, Tao Huang launched a night raid on the camp of the Prefect of Jiuzhen, Dong Yuan (董元) with several hundred soldiers, and he looted a large amount of treasure from the camp before returning. Impressed by his recent victory, Xue Xu apologized to him and even handed him command over the campaign.

Tao Huang then used the treasure obtained from Dong Yuan's camp to pay a powerful leader of the Fuyan barbarians (扶嚴夷), Lương Kỳ (梁奇; Liang Qi) to side with Wu. Dong Yuan had a strong general named Xie Xi (解系), whose brother, Xie Xiang (解象), was serving under Wu. Tao Huang sowed discord between Dong Yuan and Xie Xi by having Xie Xiang write a letter to his brother and openly showing exceptional treatment towards Xie Xiang. The plan succeeded in making Dong Yuan suspicious of Xie Xi and he had him executed. In c.May 271, Yu Si attacked Dong Yuan and killed him.

Not wanting to face the Jin troops head-on, Tao Huang took a detour through the sea to catch the Jin forces in Jiaozhi by surprise. He fought with Yang Ji's generals, Mao Jiong and Meng Yue (孟岳) at Fengxi (封溪, in present-day Đông Anh, Hanoi) and defeated them. During the battle, they feigned a retreat to lure the Wu troops into an ambush behind the broken walls. However, Tao Huang saw through the ruse and used soldiers' long jis to defeat the ambush.

In 271, (Note: Both vol.4 of Chronicles of Huayang and vol.79 of Zizhi Tongjian recorded that Wu forces captured Jiaozhi in the 7th month of that year, which corresponds to 23 Aug to 21 Sep 271 in the Julian calendar.) Tao Huang besieged Yang Ji and Mao Jiong's stronghold in Jiaozhi. Previously, Jin's Inspector of Jiao, Huo Yi swore an oath with the two that if they surrendered within 100 days of the siege, their families would be executed, and if they surrendered after 100 days and no reinforcements came, he would take the responsibility. However, Huo Yi died either before or around the time of the siege, so no reinforcements were sent. In less than 100 days, the Jin army ran out of provisions, and they asked to surrender. Tao Huang had heard of the oath, so he did not accept their surrender but instead provided the defenders with supplies to complete their remaining days. Although his subordinates remonstrated him, Tao Huang argued that his actions will promote Wu's virtue at home and abroad. After a hundred days, Yang Ji and the others surrendered as planned. (Note: According to the Chronicles of Huayang, Jiaozhi actually fell after a Jin general, Wang Yue (王約), defected to Wu during the siege after supplies had run out, and attacked the stronghold from within. The Zizhi Tongjian recorded that Eastern Wu forces took Jiaozhi after the Jin defenders ran out of supplies and reinforcements were not forthcoming; in his Zizhi Tongjian Kaoyi, Sima Guang opinioned that given Sun Hao's temperament, Tao Huang would not dare risk his liege's wrath by sending supplies to the Jin defenders as recorded in his biography in Jin Shu.) Tao Huang's general, Xiu Yun (脩允), wanted revenge on Mao Jiong, who had killed his father, Xiu Ze (脩則) (Note: Xiu Yun's brother Xiu Zhan would later join Liang Shuo in his rebellions against Wang Dun and Tao Kan.) in battle, but Tao Huang denied him as he intended to spare his life. However, Mao Jiong was soon discovered to be conspiring to assassinate Tao Huang, so Tao Huang decided to have Xiu Yun kill him. For his merits, Tao Huang was officially appointed Inspector of Jiaozhou.

After becoming Inspector of Jiaozhou, another Wu general, Teng Xiu, was struggling to quell bandits in the south. (Note: It is probable, but not certain, that Teng was already Inspector of Guangzhou at this point.) Tao Huang advised him, "The people of the south bank rely on our iron and salt, so you should stop them from being sold in the markets. That way, they will be deprived of their farming equipments, and in two years' time, they will be destroyed in one battle." Teng Xiu followed his advice and defeated the bandits.

In Jiuzhen, the Jin official, Li Zuo (李祚) continued to resist, but after a long battle, Tao Huang recaptured the commandery.

=== Administration of Jiao ===
After Jiao returned to Wu, Sun Hao further appointed Tao Huang as Commissioner with Extraordinary Powers, Chief Controller of Jiao, Governor of Jiao and General of the Front. During his time in Jiao, Tao Huang pacified the Rau and other local tribes in Wuping (武平), Jiude (九德), and Xinchang (新昌), turning them into new commanderies. When combined with Jiuzhen, the commanderies were made up of more than thirty counties. Tao Huang was also popular and beloved by the populace of Jiao. On one occasion, he was appointed as Commander of Wuchang and had to leave the province; he was to be replaced by Xiu Yun, who was then Administrator of Hepu. The people of Jiao were devastated and insisted on having Tao Huang to stay, so he was reappointed as administrator of the region.

In late 279, Jin launched its conquest of Wu. Tao Huang was positioned far from the action and was fighting the rebel Guo Ma together with Teng Xiu in Guangzhou at the time, so he did not participate in the defence. Jianye capitulated in 280 and Sun Hao formally surrendered to the Jin forces. Sun wrote a letter to Tao Huang's son, Tao Rong (陶融) to ask his father to surrender. Upon hearing the news, Tao Huang mourned his state for days before replying to give his surrender. Emperor Wu of Jin allowed him to keep his existing positions while granting him promotions, including the peerage Marquis of Wanling.

== Service in the Jin Dynasty ==
Shortly after Wu's demise, Emperor Wu intended to reduce the number of troops in each province and commandery across the state. Tao Huang personally wrote a letter to the emperor to exclude Jiaozhou from this policy. His reasoning were that Jiaozhou was too far from the capital in Luoyang, and the harsh terrains meant that a rebellion by the locals or officials would be hard to put down. He also pointed out the imminent threat of the independent commanderies around the area and his previous encounters with the Cham kingdom of Lâm Ấp, led by their king Phạm Hùng, and their ally, Funan. In the same letter, Tao Huang also requested that taxes in Jiao be paid with pearls, which were the local people's general source of income, and that merchants were to be allowed to trade in the region. Emperor Wu agreed and granted Tao's requests.

Tao Huang governed Jiaozhou for about another 10 years before dying around 290. It is said that the people of the province mourned his death greatly. He was posthumously named Marquis Lie (烈侯). He was succeeded by Wu Yan, also a former official of Wu.
