= Liangguang =

Province of Guangdong and autonomous region of Guangxi collectively

The provinces of Guangdong and Guangxi, 1936.

Liangguang (traditional Chinese: 兩廣; simplified Chinese: 两广; pinyin: Liǎngguǎng; Cantonese Yale: Léuhng Gwóng; lit. 'the Two Expanses'; Postal romanization: Liangkwang) is a Chinese term for the province of Guangdong and the former province and present autonomous region of Guangxi, collectively. It particularly refers to the viceroyalty of Liangguang under the Qing dynasty, when the territory was considered to include Hainan and the colonies of British Hong Kong, the French Kouang-Tchéou-Wan and Portuguese Macau. The Viceroyalty of Liangguang existed from 1735 to 1911.

== History ==
The area has been considered the southern expanse of China since the creation of Panyu in 226. Prior to that, the area was known as the Nanhai Commandery.

=== Guangxi autonomy ===
In the 1920s and 1930s, the areas of Guangxi dominated by the Zhuang people greatly aided the Chinese Communist Party in the Chinese Civil War. In 1952, the People's Republic of China created a Zhuang autonomous prefecture in the western half of Guangxi. However, some scholars of the Zhuang do not believe that this decision came out of genuine grassroots demands from that ethnic group, who made up only 33% of the province's population, which is contradictory to Chinese scholars that the Zhuang people clearly maintain their distinct culture and lifestyle (i.e. language, religion, etc.). Scholars like George Moseley and Diana Lary instead argue that the conversion of Guangxi to a Zhuang autonomous region was designed to foil local sentiment against the Communist Party as well as to smash pan-Lingnan sentiment. Shortly afterward, many Cantonese in the Guangxi government were replaced by Zhuangs and Guangxi annexed the Nanlu region of Guangdong in 1952, giving the formerly landlocked region access to the sea. In 1958, the entire province was officially designated the Guangxi Zhuang Autonomous Region.

=== Hainan separation ===
In 1988, Hainan was separated from Guangdong and established as a separate province.

=== European colonisation ===
==== Hong Kong ====
Hong Kong Island was ceded to the British Empire in 1842, followed by the Kowloon Peninsula in 1860 and the New Territories in 1898. They formed the single Crown colony of Hong Kong until the transfer of sovereignty to China in 1997, when it was converted into a special administrative region.

==== Kouang-Tchéou-Wan ====
Kouang-Tchéou-Wan, also known as Zhanjiang, was leased to the French Third Republic in 1898 until the end of World War II in 1946.

==== Macau ====
Macau was granted to the Portuguese Empire in 1557 until the transfer of sovereignty over Macau in 1999, when it was converted into a special administrative region.

== See also ==
- Lingnan
- Viceroy of Liangguang
