= Yuan Zhen (Jin dynasty) =

Eastern Jin dynasty general and rebel

- 袁真

Inspector of Yuzhou (豫州刺史)
- In office 362 – 369
- Monarch: Emperor Ai of Jin/Emperor Fei of Jin

Personal details
- Born: Unknown
- Died: 10 April 370
- Children: Yuan Aizhi; Yuan Shuangzi; Yuan Qin
- Occupation: Military general
- Courtesy name: Yanren (彥仁)

Yuan Zhen (died 10 April 370), courtesy name Yanren, was a Chinese military general of the Eastern Jin dynasty. He had a long career serving the Jin dynasty but he was mostly known for his rebellion in November or December 369. After failing to build a canal to secure the Jin forces' supply route during Huan Wen's campaign against Former Yan, Huan Wen was quick to blame Yuan Zhen after he returned defeated. In response, Yuan Zhen revolted in Shouchun in late 369 but would die not long after. His son Yuan Qin continued the rebellion, but he was defeated and executed in 371.

== Career under the Jin dynasty ==
Not much is known about Yuan Zhen's background or early life except that he originated from Chen Commandery. He appeared to have first served as one of Yu Yi's general in the 340s. After Yu Yi's death in August 345, one of his peers Gan Zan (干瓚) decided to revolt and kill Yu Yi's Champion General Cao Ju (曹據). Yuan Zhen allied himself with Jiang Bin (江虨), Zhu Dao (朱燾) and Mao Muzhi, and together they put down the rebellion.

Yuan Zhen was present during the early northern expeditions that followed Later Zhao's hasty decline in 350. He was serving as Administrator of Lujiang around this time, and he captured Ran Wei's city of Hefei in 350. Later in 356, Yuan Zhen, now as Dragon-Soaring General, helped repair the imperial tombs in Luoyang after Huan Wen successfully captured the city. On 21 March 362, he was stationed in Runan after he was made General of the Household Gentlemen of the West, Chief of military affairs in Yuzhou, Sizhou, Bingzhou, and Jizhou, and Inspector of Yuzhou.

At Runan, Yuan Zhen helped defend Luoyang from the Former Yan threat. The Yan general Lü Hu attacked Luoyang in 362, so Yuan Zhen assisted by keeping the ancient capital supplied with rice before falling back to Shouchun. Yuan Zhen's authority was further strengthened as he was appointed Chief Controller in Sizhou, Jizhou, and Bingzhou in 363. The following year on 22 May 364, Yan's regent Murong Ping (as the Yan ruler Murong Wei was then only 14 years old) sent Li Hong (李洪) to attack Xuchang. Huan Wen ordered Yuan Zhen to defend Pengcheng while carving out a road to help the transport of supplies. Ultimately, Xuchang fell to Yan in 365, as Emperor Ai's death forced Huan Wen to withdraw.

Yuan Zhen was one of the main benefactors in Huan Wen's expedition to conquer Former Yan in 369 together with Huan Chong, Chi Yin (郗愔) and others. During the campaign, Huan Wen was faced with a recurring problem as his supply routes were held back by a drought that made the rivers too shallow for his ships to sail. Huan Wen sent Yuan Zhen to attack Qiao and Liangguo commanderies to open up the dam at Shimen (石門; near present-day Xingyang, Henan) and allow water to flow through the rivers. However, Yuan Zhen did capture the commanderies, but he could not release the water from the dam. Furthermore, Yan forces led by Murong De later arrived at Shimen and defeated Yuan Zhen's army. As a result, Huan Wen's supply could not reach him, contributing to his decisive defeat at the Battle of Fangtou.

== Yuan Zhen's Rebellion ==
Yuan Zhen's Rebellion
- Part of the Eastern Jin and Sixteen Kingdoms period
Date	December 369 – 18 February 371
Location	Shouchun, Anhui
Result	Eastern Jin victory

Belligerents
Eastern Jin	Yuan Zhen; Former Qin; Former Yan

Commanders and leaders
Huan Wen	Yuan Zhen; Yuan Qin (executed); Zhu Fu (executed)

Strength
20,000+	Unknown

Casualties and losses
Unknown	Unknown

The defeat at Fangtou left Huan Wen angry and politically humiliated. He fully blamed Yuan Zhen for not securing his supply route, but part of this also had to do with Huan Wen wanting to save face and deflect fault. Huan Wen demanded the court strip him off his office and reduce him to a commoner. Yuan Zhen dismissed his accusations as slander and refused to accept his punishment. Yuan Zhen sent word to the Jin court about Huan Wen's own crimes, but was ignored. Thus, Yuan Zhen rebelled in Shouchun in December 369, offering submission to both Former Yan and Former Qin.

Former Yan was first to receive his submission, and wanted to make Yuan Zhen Commissioner Bearing Credentials and a few other important titles. However, their envoy Wen Tong (溫統) passed away on the way to Yuan Zhen, so Yuan Zhen never received his titles. On 7 March 370, Yuan Zhen suspected that his Interior Ministers Zhu Xian (朱憲) and Zhu Bin (朱斌) were in contact with Huan Wen, so he had them both killed.

Yuan Zhen died of natural causes on 10 April 370. He had at least three sons: Yuan Qin (袁瑾) Yuan Shuangzi (袁雙之), Yuan Aizhi (袁愛之) and Yuan Qin, the latter two who helped him killed Zhu Xian and Zhu Bin. After his death, the Administrator of Chen Commandery, Zhu Fu (朱輔) acclaimed Yuan Qin as the rebellion's new leader.

=== Yuan Qin ===
Yuan Qin (died c.February 371) decided to continue the rebellion, although leadership was evenly distributed between him and Zhu Fu. Yan acknowledged Yuan Qin's succession, and made him Inspector of Yuzhou while Zhu Fu was made Inspector of Yangzhou.

Reinforcements from Qin and Yan were sent in to support Yuan Qin, but they were blocked by Huan Wen's generals Zhu Yao (竺瑤) and Huan Shiqian. On 7 June, the Yan reinforcements were defeated by Zhu Yao and others at Wuqiu. Meanwhile, Shiqian occupied Shouchun's southern city. Not long after, Huan Wen marched out from Guangling with 20,000 soldiers to campaign against Yuan Qin. On 17 September, he defeated Yuan Qin's forces and placed Shouchun under siege. Yan cavalry led by Meng Gao were supposed to come to Yuan Qin's aid, but when he reached the north bank of the Huan river, he received news that Qin had invaded Yan, so he withdrew.

In January or February 371, a month after Qin had conquered the whole of Yan, Yuan Zhen once again requested Qin for reinforcements. Qin responded by sending Zhang Ci and Wang Jian (王堅) with 20,000 soldiers to help. However, when the Qin army arrived at Shiqiao, they were intercepted by Jin forces under Huan Yi and Huan Shiqian. They were greatly routed and withdrew to camp at Shencheng (慎城, in modern-day Fuyang, Anhui).

When news of Qin's defeat reached Shouchun, many of Yuan Qin's decided to scatter. On 18 February, Huan Wen broke through the city and captured Yuan Qin and Zhu Fu. He then sent them along with the families to the capital, Jiankang, where they were executed. Several hundred Qihuo soldiers, who supported the Yuan clan throughout the rebellion, were also executed, and their women were distributed as spoils.
