= Huan Shiqian =

Eastern Jin dynasty general (died 388)

- 桓石虔

Administrator of Hedong (河東太守)
- In office 381 – 384
- Monarch: Emperor Xiaowu of Jin

Personal details
- Born: Unknown
- Died: 388
- Relations: Huan Wen (uncle); Huan Chong (uncle)
- Children: Huan Hong; Huan Zhen; Huan Dan; Lady Huan
- Parent: Huan Huo (father)
- Posthumous name: Marquis of Zuotang (作唐侯)
- Childhood name: Zhen'e (鎮惡)

Huan Shiqian (died 388), childhood name Zhen'e, was a Chinese military general of the Eastern Jin dynasty. He was the nephew of Huan Wen and Huan Chong. Shiqian rose to fame in 354, when he single-handedly saved Huan Chong from being surrounded by Former Qin forces. He later led and followed in campaigns against Qin during the 370s as Fu Jian invaded the south to conquer Jin. Shiqian was remembered by the people of his time for his ferocity and bravery.

== Early career ==
Huan Shiqian was the son of Huan Huo, who in turn was the brother of Jin's top commander Huan Wen. From a young age, he was noted for possessing a physically strong body. He first distinguished himself in 354 during his uncle Huan Wen's first northern campaign. During the campaign, his other uncle, Huan Chong was surrounded by thousands of Former Qin troops led by Fu Jiàn and was about to be captured. Shiqian charged alone into the enemies to save him. Although they outnumbered him, the Qin soldiers did not dare attack him, so Shiqian safely rescued his uncle. Due to this event, Huan Shiqian became widely feared that it was supposedly common for people during his time to shout "Huan Shiqian has arrived! (桓石虔來!)" to patients with severe illnesses with the belief it would frighten them enough to relieve them of their diseases; many patients who received this "treatment" apparently recovered.

Shiqian followed his father to Jingzhou in 361 after Huo was assigned there. During a hunting trip, Huan Huo's party shot a couple of arrows into a beast of prey and incapacitate it. Knowing Shiqian's bravery, Huan Huo's generals challenged him to pull out one of the arrows from the beast. Shiqian quickly went to the beast and pulled out an arrow, which caused the beast to leap. However, Shiqian was able to react and jump higher than the beast. After the beast landed and fell to the ground, Shiqian pulled another arrow out from it before leaving.

== War with Yuan Zhen and Former Qin ==
Huan Shiqian first commanded an army during Huan Wen's quelling of the Yuan clan in Shouchun in 370. Just a year before, Huan Wen was badly defeated by Former Yan at the Battle of Fangtou. He blamed the general Yuan Zhen to the court as he had failed to secure the army's supply line, so Yuan Zhen in response rebelled in Shouchun and submitted to Former Qin and Former Yan. Yuan Zhen died shortly after and was succeeded by his son Yuan Qin (袁瑾). During the campaign, Shiqian took the southern part of Shouchun from Yuan Qin. Yuan Qin lasted for another year but was on the verge of falling by early 371. Former Qin sent their generals Wang Jian (王堅) and Zhang Ci to reinforce the city, but Shiqian and Huan Yi intercepted them at Shiqiao (石橋, around present-day Lu'an, Anhui). They repelled Wang Jian and Zhang Ci, allowing Huan Wen to take Shouchun with little interference. Yuan Qin and his followers were captured executed as a result. Afterwards, Shiqian served as Prefect of Jingling.

Former Qin forces conquered the Shu region from Jin in 373. The next year, a native uprising led Zhang Yu (張育) and Yang Jian (楊光) occurred, with Qin and Jin being quick to respond. Qin sent in Deng Qiang to quell the rebellion while Jin sent Shiqian and Zhu Yao to support the rebels. Shiqian and Zhu Yao attacked Diejiang, where they drove out the Qin general Yao Chang. Zhang Yu declared himself King of Shu but soon started fighting with his subordinates. Deng Qiang and Yang An took advantage of this and routed them. Deng Qiang then headed east and defeated Shiqian and Zhu Yao. Zhang Yu was killed later that year, so Former Qin regained the region.

War between Qin and Jin intensified as Fu Jian intended to conquer the south once and for all. His general Dou Gui (都貴) ordered his officers Yan Zhen (閻振) and Wu Zhong (吳仲) to invade Jingling in 381. Shiqian and his brother, Huan Shimin marched to faced them in battle. The brothers defeated the Qin forces and chased them back to Guancheng, later conquering the city. They captured the Qin commanders and took more than ten thousand captives while executing a few thousand soldiers.

Shiqian later followed his uncle Huan Chong to attack Xiangyang in 383. Shiqian and Guo Quan (郭銓) defeated Zhang Chong (張崇) at Wudang. However, Huan Chong was enticed into retreating after Murong Chui tricked him by setting torches to make his army appear bigger. His defeat would be avenged later that year when Xie Xuan won a decisive victory over Fu Jian at the Battle of Fei River. The battle drove out Qin forces from the south, and for Shiqian's merits, he was made Inspector of Yuzhou in 384.

== Final years ==
Seeing that the north fell into chaos after Feishui, the Jin court ordered Xie Xuan to lead an expedition to the north to reclaim Jin's lost territories. Shiqian was supposed to follow Xie Xuan but resigned after hearing that his mother died as he wanted to carry out a mourning session for her, so his positions were given to Zhu Xu instead. Shiqian only returned to office in 387 and had his offices restored but only held them for a year before dying in 388. Huan Shiqian was posthumously appointed General of the Right and named Marquis of Zuotang (作唐侯).
