= Deng Xia =

4th-century Chinese Jin dynasty general and folk hero

- 鄧遐

Administrator of Jingling (竟陵太守)
- In office 362 – 367
- Monarch: Emperor Ai of Jin/Emperor Fei of Jin

Personal details
- Born: Unknown
- Died: c. 370
- Parent: Deng Yue (father)
- Courtesy name: Yingyuan (應遠)

Deng Xia, courtesy name Yingyuan, was a Chinese military general and warrior of the Jin dynasty (266–420). He was a general under the Grand Marshal Huan Wen who distinguished himself as a powerful warrior in his campaigns. According to folklore, he was also a prodigy of the Chinese god, Erlang Shen, who helped the people of Xiangyang defeat a river dragon that terrorized the area.

== Career under Huan Wen ==
Deng Xia was from Chen Commandery and his father, Deng Yue (鄧嶽), once served the government. Deng Xia's strength was very well-known even among the common people, who began comparing him to the famous Han dynasty general Fan Kuai. He joined Huan Wen's army and became his Army Advisor. He eventually rose to the rank of General of the Best of the Army and Administrator of Jingling. Very few details were recorded about his exact activities in Huan Wen's campaigns, but it was said he followed Huan in many of them, which made him famous at the time.

In 352, Deng Xia assisted Zhou Fu (周撫) (Note: son of Zhou Fang. Zhou Fu and Deng's father Deng Yue both served under Wang Dun as he rebelled against the Jin imperial court. After the rebellion was crushed, both were imprisoned but were later pardoned by Wang Dao.) in besieging Xiao Jingwen (蕭敬文) although Zhou Fu had to eventually withdraw. Xiao Jingwen would be defeated by Sima Xun instead.

In c.August 362, Former Yan forces led by Lü Hu besieged Luoyang. Deng Xia and the General of the Household Gentlemen of the North, Yu Xi (庾希) (Note: son of Yu Bing) were sent by Huan Wen to reinforce the defenders. Lü Hu soon retreated but was hit by a stray arrow and died. Deng Xia advanced to Xincheng (新城; around present-day Fang County, Hubei), where he camped to defend the place.

Deng Xia's last noted activity would be in 369, during Huan Wen's campaign against Former Yan. He and Zhu Xu defeated the Former Yan general Fu Yan at Linzhu (林渚, around present-day Xinzheng, Henan). Ultimately, the campaign ended disastrously as Huan Wen was defeated at the Battle of Fangtou. Huan Wen was greatly angered and ashamed at his defeat. He had always feared that Deng Xia's courage would get in the way of his imperial ambition, so he used this campaign as an excuse to remove Deng from office.

Sometime after his removal from office, Deng Xia visited the imperial tombs. Along the way, he met Huan Wen again, who noticed that Deng Xia had grown thinner. When he asked him why, Deng Xia replied, "I am ashamed before Shuda, for I cannot forget the broken pot." (Note: This references a man named Meng Min (孟敏), whose courtesy name was Shuda and lived during the Eastern Han dynasty. The story goes that Meng Min was carrying a pot when suddenly it fell. Meng Min continued to walk on and never looked back at the pot. When asked why by Confucian scholar Guo Tai (郭泰), he said "The pot was already broken, why bother looking at it?" Thus, Deng Xia was basically saying that he could not suppress his regret and move on.) Deng Xia died not long after, and he was posthumously awarded the office of Grand Warden of Luling (廬陵; around present-day Ji'an, Jiangxi).

== In folklore ==
The people of Deng Xia's time believed that he was a general of the Chinese god, Erlang Shen. A folklore tells of Deng Xia killing a river dragon which parallels that of Erlang Shen's story. In the Mian River, it was said that there was a deep pool where lived a dragon who terrorized the people of Xiangyang. Deng Xia, serving as the Grand Warden of Xiangyang at the time, pulled out a sword and dived into the depths to kill it. According to the Book of Jin, the dragon coiled around his feet, and Deng Xia quickly chopped the dragon into pieces. The river ran red with blood, and with Deng Xia's bravery, the people of Xiangyang no longer worried about the dragon.

Liu Jingshu's (刘敬叔) Yiyuan (异苑) provided a different take on the story. Deng Xia went into the river to fight the dragon, but rather than with a sword, he defeated it with his fists and brought it ashore to kill it. However, his mother stopped him, saying that dragons are sacred creatures, and it would be wrong to kill them. Instead, she told him that he should cast an incantation on it to stop it from being violent. Deng Xia did so and released it into the river, and the dragon no longer posed a threat to the people of Xiangyang.

Deng Xia's valour earned him the title "Erlang Shen" and there is a temple dedicated to him in Zhongqingli (忠清里), Hangzhou.
