= Battle of Fangtou =

- Part of Huan Wen's Northern Expeditions
Date	March or April – 9 November 369
Location	Fangtou (in modern day Hebi, Henan); Xiangyi (in modern Sui County, Henan)
Result	Yan and Qin victory

Belligerents
Eastern Jin	Former Yan; Former Qin

Commanders and leaders
Huan Wen	Murong Chui; Gou Chi; Deng Qiang

Strength
50,000 at the start of expedition	50,000 (Murong Chui); 20,000 (Former Qin)

Casualties and losses
Heavy	Unknown

Battle of Fangtou
- Traditional Chinese: 枋頭之戰
- Simplified Chinese: 枋头之战
Transcriptions
Standard Mandarin
- Hanyu Pinyin: Fāngtóu zhī zhàn

The Battle of Fangtou (simplified Chinese: 枋头之战; traditional Chinese: 枋頭之戰; pinyin: Fāngtóu zhī zhàn), also known as the Battle of Xiangyi (simplified Chinese: 襄邑之战; traditional Chinese: 襄邑之戰; pinyin: Xiāngyì zhī zhàn), was fought between the state of Eastern Jin against the allied forces of Former Yan and Former Qin as part of Huan Wen's third and final northern expedition from March or April to 9 November 369. It concluded in a decisive victory for the alliance, putting an end to Huan Wen's ambition to reclaim northern China.

Although the battle is most known for taking place at Fangtou, the conflict that happened there was more of a stalemate that preceded the actual battle at Xiangyi.

== Background ==
With the catastrophic collapse of the Later Zhao dynasty in 351, China entered a three-way confrontation with the Eastern Jin in the south, the Former Qin in the northwest and the Former Yan in the northeast. Since then, the Jin commander, Huan Wen had launched two northern expeditions to reclaim land that were previously lost to Jin. His first expedition against the Former Qin at Chang'an ended in withdrawal, but his second expedition saw him recapturing the old capital of Luoyang in 356. While the expeditions elevated Huan Wen to a national hero in the public, they were also part of a grand scheme for him to usurp the Jin throne by receiving the nine bestowments.

Following his ascension in 360, the Yan emperor, Murong Wei entrusted his uncle and regent, Murong Ke with power over the state's military. For the next seven years, Ke expanded their territory all the way to the Huai river in the south, fighting with the Jin and ending their brief control over Luoyang in 365. He maintained stability in Yan and struck fear in the neighbouring states throughout his regency, but he soon died of an illness in May or June 367, leaving behind Murong Wei's great-uncle, Murong Ping to take his place. It was not long before the widespread corruption within the state became apparent, which was further aggravated by Ping's administration.

== Prelude ==
With Murong Ke's death and the deteriorating situation in Yan, Huan Wen saw an opportunity to capitalize. In March or April 369, he informed the imperial court his decision to launch a campaign against the Yan, bringing with him the Inspector of Xu and Yan provinces, Xi Yin, the Inspector of Jiang province, Huan Chong and the Inspector of Yu province, Yuan Zhen among others.

=== Xi Chao's strategies ===
Huan Wen's aide-de-camp, Xi Chao was a son of Xi Yin. With his help, Huan Wen took command of the forces in Xu and Yan after Xi Chao forged a letter from his father announcing his retirement and giving up his positions to Huan Wen. On 22 May, Huan Wen led 50,000 soldiers to the north from Gushu (姑孰, in modern Ma'anshan, Anhui). Along the way, Xi Chao warned his commander that transport by water will be difficult, pointing out that the march into Yan territory was long and that the Pian River was shallow. However, Huan Wen disregarded his warnings.

In June or July, Huan Wen's forces arrived at Jinxiang (金鄉, in modern Jining, Shandong), where they found that a drought had dried up the water routes in the area. Huan Wen ordered his Champion General, Mao Husheng to dig up a canal at Juye, drawing water from the Wen river into the Qing river. After the canal was built, Huan Wen sailed up the Qing river and entered the Yellow river with a massive navy. As they sailed along, Xi Chao once again stressed to Huan Wen the danger of their vulnerable supply lines and presented him with two options; the first was to concentrate their forces and march straight to Ye, where they should seek a quick and decisive victory. The second was to place garrisons along the Yellow and Ji rivers, where they can properly establish their supply lines and attack the following summer. Once again, Huan Wen dismissed his ideas.

=== Initial battles ===
Soon, Huan Wen ordered the General Who Established Might, Tan Xuan (檀玄) to attack Hulu (湖陸; in present-day Yutai County, Shandong). Tan Xuan captured Hulu, along with the General Who Calms the East, Murong Zhong (慕容忠). In response, Murong Wei dispatched the Grand Commander of the Expeditionary Forces, Murong Li (慕容厲) with 20,000 soldiers to repel Huan Wen at Huangxu (黃墟; south of present-day Guan County, Shandong), but was greatly defeated, with Li having to escape alone on horseback. The Administrator of Gaoping, Xu Fan (徐翻), surredered his commandery to the Jin forces, while the Jin Vanguard Commanders, Deng Xia and Zhu Xu routed the Yan general, Fu Yan (傅顏) at Linzhu (林渚, around present-day Xinzheng, Henan).

Murong Wei sent the Prince of Le'an, Murong Zang with more troops against Huan Wen, but once again failed. In July or August, Huan Wen set up camp at Wuyang (武陽; in present-day Shen County, Shandong), where the local leader, Sun Yuan (孫元), led his followers to rebel against Yan and defected to Jin. Around this time, Huan Wen had also sent Yuan Zhen to attack Qiao and Liang commanderies for the purpose of opening Shimen (石門; near present-day Xingyang, Henan) and transporting supplies by water.

== The battle ==
=== Murong Chui takes command ===
Huan Wen then advanced to Fangtou (枋頭, in modern Hebi, Henan), sending Murong Wei and Murong Ping into panic. They planned to flee to Helong, but just then, the Prince of Wu, Murong Chui stepped forward and volunteered to lead a last-ditch effort. Chui, an uncle of Murong Wei and an accomplished general, was not liked by Murong Ping and Wei's wife, Empress Kezuhun, who saw him as a potential rival to their imperial power. Nonetheless, with the empire in crisis, Wei agreed and had his uncle replace Murong Zang. Thus, Chui, the Prince of Fanyang, Murong De and others set out with 50,000 soldiers to meet Huan Wen in battle.

=== Alliance with Former Qin ===
When Murong Zang was first defeated, Murong Wei had sent the Regular Mounted Attendant, Li Feng (李鳳) to seek help from the Former Qin. Now, he sent another attendant, Yue Song (樂嵩) for the same purpose, offering them land west of Hulao including the Luoyang region in exchange for reinforcements. The Heavenly King of Qin, Fu Jian held a meeting in his court to discuss the matter. Many of his court officials rejected the proposal, citing that Yan did not help Qin when Huan Wen invaded them in his first expedition. However, the Prime Minister, Wang Meng privately advised Fu Jian that Huan Wen posed a bigger threat to the north, and that even if Yan survived this invasion, they would require time to recover, during which Qin could take advantage of them.

In the end, Fu Jian went with Wang Meng's suggestion. He dispatched the general, Gou Chi and the Inspector of Luo province, Deng Qiang with 20,000 soldiers to reinforce Yan, and they passed through Luoyang to camp at Yingchuan.

=== Cutting of Jin supply lines ===
Huan Wen had been following the guide of Duan Si (段思), a Yan defector, but he was later captured during a battle with Xiluo Teng. He also sent an old Later Zhao general, Li Shu (李述) to win over the Zhao and Wei regions. Xiluo Teng soon fought and killed the General of the Household Rapid as Tigers, Ran Ganjin (染干津), and morale within the Jin army began to fall.

Meanwhile, Yuan Zhen managed to capture Qiao and Liang, but he unable to break through Shimen, so the supply line was never established. In September and October, Murong De with 10,000 cavalry and the Imperial Clerk Preparing Documents, Liu Dang (劉當) with 5,000 cavalry occupied Shimen. The Yan Inspector of Yu province, Li Gui (李邽), also led his 5,000 soldiers to cut off Huan Wen's existing supply lines. At Shimen, Murong De sent his general, Murong Zhou (慕容宙) with 1,000 cavalry to lead the vanguard. Upon finding a Jin force, Zhou sent 300 riders to fight a skirmish with them before feigning retreat. As the Jin troops pursued them, Zhou and his remaining cavalry launched an ambush from three sides and killed a great number of them.

At this point, Huan Wen was incurring heavier losses with each battle he fought, and his grain supply was nearly depleted. Soon, reports of Qin reinforcements approaching also reached him. Thus, on 4 November, he burned his ships, abandoned his supply and equipment before retreating by land. He retreated from Dongyan Commandery (東燕郡; in present-day Puyang, Henan) to Cangyuan (倉垣, in modern Kaifeng, Henan), ordering his soldiers to dig wells as they marched for them to drink.

=== Battle of Xiangyi ===
Seeing the Jin retreat, the Yan generals wanted to give chase, but Murong Chui precluded them. Instead, he proposed that they slowly follow them, giving the impression that they have no intention of attacking. If Huan Wen falls for their deception, Chui predicted that he would then make a run for it, further tiring his already fatigued and hungry soldiers; only then can they attack and easily defeat him.

Chui led eight thousand cavalry to follow Huan Wen, and just as he predicted, Huan Wen began a speedy retreat. On 9 November, the Yan army caught up with them at Xiangyi (襄邑; present-day Sui County, Henan), where Murong De was waiting in ambush with 4,000 cavalry along the streams to the east. Murong Chui and Murong De attacked Huan Wen from two sides and dealt him a serious defeat, killing tens of thousands of his soldiers. Huan Wen escaped and continued his retreat, but at Qiao Commandery. he was attacked by Qin forces led by Gou Chi, suffering another defeating and losing several more thousands soldiers. Sun Yuan attempted to hold out in Wuyang, but he was defeat by the Yan's Left General of the Guards, Meng Gao (孟高).

== Aftermath ==
Huan Wen eventually made it back to Jin territory and camped at Shanyang (山陽; in present-day Sheyang County, Jiangsu) on 7 December. He shifted the blame of the campaign's defeat onto Yuan Zhen, as he did not establish the supply route at Shimen as he was ordered to. In response, Yuan Zhen rebelled in Shouchun, and Huan Wen would spend the next one and a half year besieging him and his family. The failure of the third northern expedition also prevented Huan Wen from receiving the nine bestowments. In his final years, he attempted to politically maneuver his way into seizing the imperial throne before succumbing to old age, never realizing his ambitions.

Meanwhile, Murong Chui returned from Xiangyi lauded as a hero. However, his tension with Murong Ping and Empress Kezuhun had reached a boiling point, as they feared that he would use his newfound reputation to undermine them. They refused to award Chui and his generals, and instead began secretly plotted to have him executed. The plot leaked to Chui, and left with nowhere else to escape, he fled west and defected to the Former Qin. Finally, the Yan reneged on their promise to cede the lands west of Hulao, but weakened by their recent invasion, they soon had to face another invasion the emboldened forces of Qin. Just a year after their victory at Fangtou, the Yan would fall to the Qin.

== Sources ==
- Schreiber, Gerhard (1956), "THE HISTORY OF THE FORMER YEN DYNASTY 前 燕 (285-370)", Monumenta Serica, vol. 15, no. 1, JSTOR, pp. 1–141
- Killigrew, John W. (2013), "The Role of the Moushi 谋士 in the Jin Shu and Wei Shu During the Northern Kingdoms Period, 309–450 AD", Journal of Asian History, vol. 47, no. 2, JSTOR, pp. 151–96, doi:10.13173/jasiahist.47.2.0151
- Book of Jin
- Zizhi Tongjian
