= Huangfu Zhen =

Former Yan official

- 皇甫真

Minister of Works (司空)
- In office 365 – 367
- Monarch: Murong Wei

Grand Commandant (太尉)
- In office 365 – 367
- Monarch: Murong Wei

Commandant of the Chariots (奉車都尉)
- In office 371 – ?
- Monarch: Fu Jian

Personal details
- Born: Unknown Chaona, Gansu
- Died: Unknown
- Relations: Huangfu Ji (brother); Huangfu Tian (brother)
- Courtesy name: Chuji (楚季)

Huangfu Zhen (fl. 4th century), courtesy name Chuji, was a Chinese official of Former Yan during the Sixteen Kingdoms period. One of the few officials to serve four generations of Murong Hui's lineage, Zhen was an outlier of the group, as he was able to live long enough to see Yan's demise to Former Qin in 370. During the reign of Murong Wei, Zhen was a key ally to Murong Ke who warned him about Muyu Gen and aided him in defeating the rebel, Lü Hu. Zhen was also commended for being Yan's last few competent ministers during its final four years of existence as corruption under Murong Ping's regency led the state to its downfall.

== Service under Murong Hui ==
Huangfu Zhen was from Chaona County in Anding Commandery (安定郡, present-day Zhenyuan, Gansu province). Ever since he was young, he was noted to be naturally gifted. In 313, his brother, Huangfu Ji (皇甫岌), received an invitation from the Jin dynasty vassal, Murong Hui, who wanted Ji to serve in his administration. Ji accepted it and brought along Zhen to meet with Murong Hui. Both were accepted into Hui's administration, with Zhen being one of Hui's officials who he trusted in handling confidential affairs. When Zhen turned 20, Murong Hui had him served as a Household-Attendant in his fief.

== Service under Murong Huang ==
When Murong Huang succeeded as Duke of Liaodong in 333, Huangfu Zhen was made a Registrar. Although Huang had only taken his father's place, he immediately began imposing harsh and strict laws which unsettled many of his people who were used to Hui's more lenient governance. Huangfu Zhen bluntly advised Huang against his actions, but Huang ignored him. Months later, Huang's younger brother, Murong Ren, rebelled and easily took over Liaodong after many among the populace decided to surrender to him. Huang regretted not taking Huangfu Zhen's earlier warnings, so he had him appointed Attendant Officer With Separate Carriage of Pingzhou.

During the civil war between Huang and Ren, Huang's territory was plagued with internal problems which exhausted the people. Huangfu Zhen proposed to Huang that they reduce their taxes and grant them more rest from corvée labour. However, because his suggestions were not aligned with the state's policy, Murong Huang had him stripped of office.

After defeating Murong Ren in 336, Huang declared himself the Prince of Yan the following year. He began giving out new positions to his officials including Huangfu Zhen, who he made rong qi chang shi (宂騎常侍). Zhen was able to win back Murong Huang's trust in 338 by distinguishing himself in Huang's victory over the Later Zhao general, Ma Qiu. Because of this, Zhen was appointed Commandant of the Chariots and acting Administrator of Liaodong and Yingqiu. In all his new roles, it was said that he governed well.

== Service under Murong Jun ==
Murong Huang became ill in 348 and died shortly after. Following the succession of his son, Murong Jun, Huangfu Zhen was called into the court to serve as Prefect of the Canons and Texts. In 350, Murong Jun held an invasion of the Central Plains. Serving as Prefect of the Directors of Writing, Huangfu Zhen was assigned to the rear, where he was tasked in handling state affairs while Jun and the others oversaw the offence.

Yan captured and executed the ruler of Ran Wei, Ran Min in 352. His heir, Ran Zhi, was in still in their capital, Ye and continued to resist. Murong Jun sent his uncle Murong Ping to capture Ye and later reinforced him with Huangfu Zhen, Yang Wu and Murong Jūn. Ye eventually fell and Ran Zhi was captured on 8 September 352, thus ending the short-lived state. In the aftermath of the siege, Huangfu Zhen did not plunder Ye's many treasures and funds. He instead focused on providing relief to the people within the city as well as gathering maps and records from the archives.

On 3 January 353, prior to becoming Emperor, Murong Jun handed out imperial offices to his officials, including Huangfu Zhen who became deputy director of the Left of the Masters of Writing. The next day, Jun proclaimed himself Emperor of Yan and broke away from the Jin dynasty.

== Service under Murong Wei ==
=== Muyu Gen affair ===
Murong Jun's son, Murong Wei ascended the throne in 360 after his father succumbed to his illness. Wei was still a child, so Murong Jun appointed four regents to him before his death, which included Jun's brother Murong Ke and the general Muyu Gen. Gen was an accomplished veteran of the state and was very jealous towards Murong Ke, who was given more power than him despite Gen serving a relatively longer time. He attempted to stir trouble by to persuading Ke into taking the throne. However, Ke refused to listen and instead reprimanded him. Ke later brought the matter to his brother, Murong Chui and Huangfu Zhen.

Zhen had always suspected Muyu Gen of attempting to grab more power for himself. Now that this incident came to light, Zhen told Ke that he must do what was best for the state and get rid of Muyu Gen before he causes trouble in the future. Murong Ke originally refused to take his advice, believing it to be inappropriate for a regent to kill a co-regent. However, as Ke discovered the subjects of Muyu Gen's latest advices to Murong Wei, Murong Ke and Murong Ping immediately had him and his family arrested and executed. Murong Ke later apologized to Huangfu Zhen for not listening to him.

=== Campaign against Lü Hu ===
In 361, Yan's Administrator of Henei, Lü Hu, rebelled against Yan and surrendered to Jin. Murong Ke proposed to the court that they get Lü Hu to surrender with an edict instead of subduing him through force. However, Huangfu Zhen disagreed, pointing out that Lü Hu have betrayed Yan three times already in the past nine years. Zhen argued that Lü Hu must be killed in order to show their strength. Murong Ke took his advice and brought Zhen to lead a joint campaign on Lü Hu with him.

Lü's base in Yewang (野王縣; present-day Qinyang, Henan) was besieged for months, and the situation for him gradually deteriorated. Huangfu Zhen's division was the weakest between his and Murong Ke's, so Zhen warned his subordinates to be wary as he suspected that Lü Hu would make a last resort attack on their army in order to flee. Just as Zhen predicted, Lü Hu gathered his best troops and concentrated them on Huangfu Zhen, but he was unable to break through the siege line. Murong Ke quickly linked up with Zhen and attacked Lü Hu. Lü's army was decimated, and Lü himself barely escaped to Xingyang.

After returning from the campaign, Huangfu Zhen was awarded the offices of General Who Guards The West, Inspector of Bingzhou, and acting General of the Household Gentlemen Who Protects The Xiongnu. He was then recalled to the court to serve as Palace Attendant and Household Counsellor. In 365, he became Minister of Works and acting chief of the Palace Secretariat.

=== Rise of Former Qin ===
Murong Ke was widely feared throughout the land as a powerful general when he was alive, so when he died in 367, Yan's neighbours, Former Qin and Jin began plotting their next move against Yan. Qin's ruler, Fu Jian, sent the Xiongnu chieftain Cao Gu to visit Yan ostensibly to present tribute, but following Cao was Jian's agent, Guo Bian (郭辯) who he tasked in inspecting the situation in Yan. Zhen had an elder brother named Huangfu Tian (皇甫腆) and two nephews named Huangfu Fen (皇甫奮) and Huangfu Fu (皇甫覆). All three of them were serving Qin, so Guo Bian decided to use this fact against Huangfu Zhen to test him. He said to Zhen, "Though I am a native of Qin, the state had my family executed. That is why I place my trust in Lord Cao. Your elder brother and nephews are all close acquaintances of mine." Zhen reacted angrily towards his statements and accused him of malicious intent. Zhen asked Murong Ping to interrogate Guo, but Ping refused. When Guo returned to Fu Jian, he reported to him, "There is little discipline within the Yan government, they are ready for the taking. Only Huangfu Zhen is knowledgable, so we should be careful of him." Fu Jian said, "In all their six provinces, they have yet to find a single man of wisdom. Though Huangfu Zhen serves Yan, his roots lie in the land of Qin. No doubt that the Guanxi is filled with many talented gentlemen."

After Yang Wu died in 367, Huangfu Zhen replaced him as Grand Commandant and was once again appointed Palace Attendant. The following year, the Qin princes, Fu Liu (苻柳), Fu Shuang (苻雙), Fu Sou (苻廋) and Fu Wu (苻武) rebelled against Fu Jian. Murong De wrote a memorial to the court proposing that they intervene in Fu Jian's civil war, adding that Huangfu Zhen, Murong Chui and Murong Ping should be dispatched to assist them at once. However, his memorial was rejected by Murong Ping. Fu Sou later wrote a letter to Murong Chui and Huangfu Zhen, warning them about Fu Jian and his talented advisor Wang Meng, as well as asking them for help. Murong Chui said to Huangfu Zhen, "The greatest threat of our time is certainly Qin, but seeing our lord's youth and the Grand Tutor's (Murong Ping) insightfulness, how can they ever be a match for Fu Jian and Wang Meng?" Zhen replied, "Indeed, but even if I know it, what good would it be if no one listens to me?" By the end of the year, all four princes were defeated, and order was restored in Qin.

=== Fall of Yan and later life ===
In 369, the Grand Marshal of Jin, Huan Wen, launched a grand expedition against Yan. Yan allied themselves with Qin, and after a decisive Yan victory at the Battle of Fangtou by Murong Chui, Huan Wen was driven back south. Yan had promised Qin with territory west of Hulao but retracted it after they no longer need their help. Qin saw this as their pretext to invade Yan. This was even further fuelled by Murong Chui's defection from Yan to Qin. When Yan's envoy, Liang Chen (梁琛) returned from Qin, his alarming reports were disregarded by both Murong Ping and Murong Wei, but Huangfu Zhen became worried when he came to know of it. Zhen submitted a petition to the court, urging them to take the Qin threat seriously and fortify Luoyang, Taiyuan, and Huguan garrisons.

Murong Wei turned to Murong Ping in regard to Zhen's petition, but Ping assured him that Qin posed no harm to Yan, so the petition was largely ignored. In the end, both Wei and Ping were proven wrong, as Qin was able to conquer Yan within a year by 370. Fu Jian entered Yan's capital of Ye in December of that year. When Wang Meng first entered Ye, Huangfu Zhen only looked up at the head of Wang's horse and saluted him. The next day, Zhen began addressing Wang as 'minister'. When asked why, Zhen replied, "Minister, yesterday you were an enemy, this morning you are a gentleman of my state. What is so strange in saluting an enemy and addressing a fellow gentleman as 'minister'?" Wang Meng was pleased with his answer.

In January 371, Huangfu Zhen was brought to Qin's capital in Chang'an. He was appointed Commandant of the Chariots and would serve Qin for several years before dying of old age. His year of death is not recorded.

== Personality ==
According to the Book of Jin, Huangfu Zhen was very frugal and had very little ambition. He did not associate himself with any industry and was measured in the way he drinks. A talented writer, he also wrote at least 40 poems and rhapsodies throughout his life.
