= Dashun =

Dashun or Da Shun ("Great Shun") may refer to:

- Emperor Shun (帝舜), legendary leader of ancient China
- Shun dynasty (1644–1645), short-lived state under Li Zicheng
- Dashun (890–891), era name used by Emperor Zhaozong of Tang
- Dashun (1644–1646), era name used by Zhang Xianzhong

== Places in China ==
- Dashun, Anhui, town in Shou County, Anhui
- Dashun, Chongqing, town in Fuling District, Chongqing
