= Zhu Xu (Jin dynasty) =

Eastern Jin dynasty general (died 393)

- 朱序

Inspector of Yongzhou (雍州刺史)
- In office 388 – 392
- Monarch: Emperor Xiaowu of Jin

Personal details
- Born: Unknown
- Died: 393
- Relations: Zhu Xiuzhi (grandson)
- Children: Zhu Lüe; Zhu Chen
- Parents: Zhu Tao (father); Lady Han (mother)
- Courtesy name: Cilun (次倫)
- Peerage: Viscount of Xiangping (襄平子)

Zhu Xu (died 393), courtesy name Cilun, was a military general of the Jin dynasty (266–420). He was most famous for his involvement in the crucial Battle of Fei River in 383, in which he set up a ruse that caused the disastrous retreat of the Former Qin army. Prior to Fei River, Zhu put down the rebellion of Sima Xun and defended Xiangyang from Qin for more than a year before he was captured and served a brief stint under Qin. After Fei River, Zhu Xu returned to Jin and continued to serve the state. He guarded the northern borders and fought against the states of Zhai Wei and Western Yan before retiring in 392.

== Background ==
Zhu Xu came from a family line of generals in Yiyang Commandery (義陽郡, around present-day Zaoyang, Hubei). His father, Zhu Tao (朱燾) once served as Colonel of the Western Rong and Governor of Yizhou. Zhu Xu would continue the family trend, and by 365, he was already serving as General of Hawkish Display and Chancellor of Jiangxia.

== Prior to the Battle of Fei River ==
=== Sima Xun's Rebellion ===
That same year, the Inspector of Liangzhou, Sima Xun, rebelled in his province and placed the Inspector of Yizhou, Zhou Chu (周楚), under siege at Chengdu. The Grand Marshal of Jin, Huan Wen appointed Zhu Xu to be Commander-Protector of the Expeditionary Force tasked in saving Chengdu. The following year, Zhu Xu attacked Sima Xun at Chengdu together with Zhou Chu. Sima Xun's soldiers scattered during the fight. Zhu Xu soon captured Sima Xun and his subordinates before sending them to Huan Wen, who had them all executed. Zhu Xu was awarded the office of General Who Attacks Barbarians and the title of Viscount of Xiangping (襄平子).

=== Huan Wen's 3rd Northern Expedition ===
In 369, Zhu Xu participated in Huan Wen's third northern expedition against Former Yan. During the expedition, Zhu Xu and Deng Xia defeated Yan's general, Fu Yan at Linzhu (林渚, around present-day Xinzheng, Henan). The campaign ended in failure for Huan Wen as he was decisively routed by Murong Chui at the Battle of Fangtou.

=== Qian Hong's Revolt ===
In 374, Zhu Xu was appointed Inspector of Yanzhou. Around the same time, a native of Changcheng County (長城; present-day Changxing County, Zhejiang), Qian Hong (錢弘), gathered more than a hundred people under his wing and revolted, hiding out in Mount Yuanxiang (原鄉山). The court issued Zhu Xu to campaign against the rebels after appointing him Marshal of the Centre Army and Administrator of Wuxing. Zhu Xu sent his army out and pacified the rebellion after reprimanding Qian Hong and the others. Following this, Zhu Xu returned to his position as Inspector of Yanzhou.

=== Siege of Xiangyang ===
In 376, Zhu Xu was called up by Huan Chong to defend Liangzhou from invading Former Qin forces. However, the province swiftly fell before they could arrive, so Zhu Xu and the others stopped advancing and returned. The following year, Huan Huo appointed him Inspector of Liangzhou and stationed him at Xiangyang.

In 378, Fu Jian ordered Fu Pi to lead a large-scale siege on Xiangyang. When Qin forces arrived at the Han River, Zhu Xu initially did not think much of them as they did not have any boats with them. He was only alerted after Qin's general, Shi Yue, swam across the Han River with his cavalries and caught him by surprise. Shi Yue captured the boats on Zhu Xu's side for Fu Jian and the others to use. As Qin forces approached, Zhu Xu's mother, Lady Han (韓氏), personally inspected the Xiangyang's defence and noticed that the northwest corner was weak. She led hundreds of women in the city to construct a new wall behind the old one. When Qin forces arrived, the old wall fell, but the defenders mounted behind the new one that the women built. The wall was dubbed "The Wives' Wall (夫人城)" and can still be seen today in Xiangyang.

The following year, Zhu was expected to receive reinforcements from Liu Bo (劉波). However, Liu Bo feared the Qin army's strength and refused to approach them. Meanwhile, Zhu sent his men out to fight skirmishes with the Qin soldiers, but Qin only reacted by pulling back and refusing to give fight. This gave Zhu Xu the false impression that Qin was planning a retreat, so he did not prepare proper defence for what was to come. Without Zhu's knowledge, the Protector of Xiangyang, Li Bohu (李伯護), made contact with Qin, promising them to provide them an entry to the city. Fu Pi attacked Xiangyang again in February or March 379, this time capturing the city and Zhu Xu.

=== Escape attempt from Qin ===
After being sent to the capital, Fu Jian was impressed by Zhu Xu's loyalty and appointed him Logistical Director of the Masters of Writing. Meanwhile, Li Bohu was executed for his betrayal against Jin. Despite Fu Jian's flattery, Zhu Xu was determined to return to Jin. He fled to his hometown in Yiyang, where he hid in the home of his friend Xia Kui (夏揆). However, Fu Jian became suspicious of Xia Kui and arrested him, so Zhu Xu decided to give himself up to Fu Hui (苻晖). This only made Fu Jian further admire Zhu Xu for his integrity, and Zhu was appointed as a Master of Writing.

== Battle of Fei River ==
In 383, Zhu Xu accompanied Fu Jian in his campaign to conquer Jin once and for all. Fu Jian led a massive army to face the Jin forces at Fei River, which were commanded by Xie Xuan. With an overwhelming number on his side, Fu Jian sent Zhu Xu to intimidate Jin into surrendering. However, Zhu Xu instead leaked information about the Qin army to Jin general, Xie Shi, saying, "If all the millions of Qin soldiers were to assemble, it would be difficult for us to defeat them. As of now, their troops have yet to gather, so it is best that we attack quickly. Once their vanguard is defeated, their morale will surely plummet. Only then can we rout them." Zhu Xu later returned to Fu Jian, who had not known what Zhu had done.

As the battle was about to begin, Xie Xuan told Fu Jian to move his army slightly back away from the river to allow the Jin troops to cross. Fu Jian agreed, so his brother Fu Rong commanded the Qin army to move back. As soon as they moved, Zhu Xu, who was serving in the rear, shouted, "The Qin army has been defeated!" Many of the Qin soldiers were conscripts who were not willing to fight, so upon hearing Zhu Xu's order, they began to panic and flee from the battlefield disorderly. Xie Xuan quickly crossed the river and attacked the Qin forces, decisively routing them. Fu Rong was killed in battle while Fu Jian barely escaped, but his northern empire would soon crumble because of this defeat. As for Zhu Xu, he managed to escape back to Jin together with another Jin general Zhou Xiao and the abdicated ruler of Former Liang, Zhang Tianxi.

== Post-Fei River ==
=== Battles with Zhai Liao ===
After his return to Jin, Zhu Xu continued his service with the state, being first appointed as Prancing Dragon General and Interior Minister of Langye. He was later stationed at Luoyang after being promoted to Inspector of Yuzhou and Chief Controller of Yangzhou and five counties in Yuzhou. In 386, a Dingling chieftain, Zhai Liao, rebelled against Jin in Liyang (黎陽; northeast of present-day Xun County, Henan) after killing its administrator, Teng Tianzhi (滕恬之). Zhu Xu ordered Qin Ying (秦膺) and Tong Bin (童斌) to lead troops against Zhai Liao. Later that year, Liao attacked Qiao (譙; present-day Bozhou, Anhui) but was repelled by Zhu Xu.

In 387, Zhu Xu was entrusted with the positions of Inspector of Qingzhou and Yanzhou. He was then stationed in Pengcheng to replace Xie Xuan, although he later moved his base to Huaiyin, as it was closer to the capital and further from the borders of the powerful Later Yan. That same year, Zhai Liao's son, Zhai Zhao, attacked Chenliu and Yingchuan. Zhu Xu sent Qin Ying to defend the commanderies, and Zhai Zhao was driven back. For his merits, Zhu Xu was appointed General Who Campaigns Against the Caitiff. Zhu later requested the court to transport 100,000 hu (斛) of rice and 5,000 pieces of cloth for military use from Jiangzhou. In 388, Zhu Xu was made Chief Controller of Sizhou, Yongzhou, Liangzhou, and Qinzhou and Inspector of Yongzhou. He was also given the generals Yang Quanqi and Zhao Mu (趙睦) to serve as his subordinates. Zhu Xu sent another request to the court, this time asking for supplies from 1,000 hectares of land from the office of the former Inspector of Jingzhou, Huan Shisheng (桓石生) as well as 80,000 hu of rice. Afterwards, he went to guard Luoyang.

=== Defence of Luoyang ===
In 390, the Western Yan Emperor, Murong Yong, led his troops to invade Luoyang, so Zhu Xu crossed the Yellow River and faced Yong's general, Wang Ci (王次). Wang Ci was defeated at the Qin River and retreated. Zhu then sent Zhao Mu and Huan Bucai (桓不才) to pursue the fleeing Yan army, allowing them to defeat Yong at Taihang. Murong Yong retreated to Shangdang, and not long after, Zhu Xu received the submission from the minor warlord named Yang Kai. Zhu Xu continued to pursue Murong Yong as far as the White River (白水) in Shangdang, where they fought for 20 days. Meanwhile, Zhai Liao, now Heavenly King of Zhai Wei, took advantage of Zhu Xu's absence and tried to attack Luoyang. Hearing this, Zhu Xu quickly withdrew. Zhu Xu attacked Zhai Zhao at Shimen (石門; north of present-day Fuyang, Anhui) while his Army Advisor, Zhao Fan, routed Zhai Liao at Huai County (懷縣; present-day Wuzhi County. Henan). After Zhai Liao retreated, Zhu Xu stayed in Luoyang for a while and left his general Zhu Dang (朱黨) to defend Shimen. Soon, Zhu Xu placed his son, Zhu Lüe (朱略) in charge of Luoyang while he himself withdrew to Xiangyang. Because of this, Sima Daozi commented that Zhu Xu's victories and defeats were equal, without further praise nor criticism.

=== Assisting Zhou Qiong ===
Later, the Former Qin general, Dou Chong, feigned surrender to Jin. After Jin accepted him, Dou immediately defected back to Qin and invaded Hanzhong. The Jin administrators, Huangfu Zhao (皇甫釗) and Zhou Xun (周勳), surrendered three counties of Baxi (巴西; around present-day Langzhong, Sichuan) to Dou. Jin's Inspector of Liangzhou, Zhou Qiong (周瓊), had little troops to resist them, so he asked Zhu Xu to send reinforcements. Zhu issued Huangfu Zhen (皇甫貞; not to be confused with Former Yan's Huangfu Zhen) to assist Zhou Qiong, and the two men drove Dou Chong out from Hanzhong while killing Huangfu Zhao and Zhou Xun.

=== Retirement and death ===
Near the end of his life, Zhu Xu requested the court for permission to resign multiple times, citing his old age and illness. However, the court refused to grant him. Near the end of 392, Zhu Xu once more requested for his resignation, but was again denied. As a result, Zhu Xu left his post without authorization. Just ten days later, he surrendered himself to the Minister of Justice and asked to be punished. The court showed him leniency and pardoned his actions. He was then allowed to resign, with his final positions handed over to Chi Hui (郗恢). Zhu Xu died in 393 and was posthumously appointed General of the Left and Cavalier in Regular Attendance.
