= Mao Muzhi =

Jin dynasty military staff

- 毛穆之

Champion General (冠軍將軍)
- In office 369 – 370
- Monarch: Emperor Fei of Jin

Personal details
- Born: Unknown
- Died: c. 379
- Relations: Mao Xiuzhi (grandson)
- Children: Mao Zhen; Mao Zhu; Mao Qiu; Mao Fan; Mao Jin; Mao Yuan
- Parent: Mao Bao (father)
- Courtesy name: Xianzu (憲祖)
- Childhood name: Husheng (虎生)
- Posthumous name: Lie (烈)

Mao Muzhi (died c. 379), courtesy name Xianzu, also known as Mao Xianzu (毛憲祖) and Mao Husheng (毛虎生), was a military officer during the Jin dynasty (266–420). He was the son of the Jin general Mao Bao and served under Yu Yi before serving under Huan Wen. He assisted in Huan Wen's northern expeditions and later the Jin defence against Former Qin's conquest.

== Service under Yu Yi and Huan Wen ==
Mao Muzhi's father was Mao Bao, a distinguished general. His given name underwent many changes in his later years. First, he changed his given name to his style name Xianzu (憲祖) in 361 due to taboo as Emperor Ai of Jin's wife, was named Wang Muzhi. As Huan Wen rose to power and slowly took control of the state, Mao went through another name change due to taboo again, as Huan Wen's mother's given name was 'Xian (憲)'. This time, he used his childhood name, 'Husheng (虎生)'

Mao Muzhi first served in the staff of Yu Yi, who at the time was busy preparing invasions against Cheng Han and Later Zhao. His brother Yu Bing died in 344, and with no one else in the Yu clan to handle home affairs, Yu Yi chose his son Yu Fangzhi (庾方之) to guard Xiangyang. However, Fangzhi was too young, so Yu Yi entrusted Muzhi, to be Fangzhi's marshal. Yu Yi died the following year in 345 from an ulcer, which led to many among his staff led by Gan Zan (干瓚) to mutiny. Mao Muzhi, Yuan Zhen, Jiang Bin (江虨) and Zhu Dao (朱燾) joined forces and put down Gan Zan's rebellion.

After the death of Yu Yi, Mao Muzhi went to serve Huan Wen, who in 345 became Inspector of Jingzhou. Mao Muzhi participated in Huan's second northern expedition in 356 serving as Administrator of Yingchuan. After Huan Wen captured Luoyang, Mao Muzhi was left to guard Luoyang while they wait for Xie Shang's arrival.

In 369, Mao Muzhi, now Mao Husheng, was involved in Huan Wen's third northern expedition to destroy Former Yan. Husheng was serving as Huan Wen's Champion General and was tasked in building a canal at Juye to allow water to flow from the Wen River to the Qing River. After Huan Wen was badly defeated at Fangtou, Husheng was appointed Chief Controller of four commanderies, and as Administrator of Eastern Yan. He was further made Administrator of Huainan to defend Liyang when Yuan Zhen's Rebellion broke out shortly after the defeat at Fangtou.

After Huan Wen deposed Emperor Fei in 371, Mao Husheng was made Chief Controller in Jingzhou north of the Mian River and in Yizheng in Yangzhou. His brother, Mao Anzhi (毛安之) also played an important role in Huan Wen's government, tasked in defending the palace with his guards.

== Defense against Former Qin ==
Huan Wen died in 373, leaving behind a state dominated by his family but also one that was facing a serious threat from Former Qin. Mao Husheng was made the new Inspector of Yizhou in 373 after the province fell to Former Qin forces. Mao Husheng and his son Mao Qiu (毛球) campaigned against Qin but did not have enough supply and had to abandon the campaign after reaching Baxi (巴西; around present-day Langzhong).

In 378, the Jin general Peng Chao attacked Pengcheng. Mao Husheng camped at Gushu (姑孰; present-day Dangtu County, Anhui) to oppose a potential attack, although the situation was relieved the following year as Xie Xuan drove out Peng Chao. Mao Husheng's last military activity was in 379, attacking Bazhong to save Weixing (魏興; southeast of present-day Suqian, Jiangsu). However, he had to retreat to Badong as forces led by his ally Zhao Fu (趙福) were badly defeated by Qin. There was an attempt by the Shu native Li Wu (李烏) to help Husheng by attacking Chengdu, but he too was defeated.

Mao Husheng died not long after this from illness. For his long service, Husheng was posthumously named 'Lie' and appointed as General of the Central Army.
