= Ying He =

Ying He may refer to:

- Ying River (颍河; Yǐng Hé), river in Henan and Anhui, China
- He Ying (born 1977), Chinese archer
- Yinghe, town in Shou County, Anhui, China
- He Ying (revolutionary) (1886–1933), Chinese communist revolutionary
