= Lingtai County =

Lingtai County 灵台县
- County
- Location of the seat in Gansu
- Coordinates: 35°03′43″N 107°25′33″E
- Country: China
- Province: Gansu
- Prefecture-level city: Pingliang
- County seat: Zhongtai

Area
  - Total: 2,038 km^{2} (787 sq mi)
- Highest elevation: 1,520 m (4,990 ft)
- Lowest elevation: 890 m (2,920 ft)

Population (2019)
  - Total: 229,100
  - Density: 112.4/km^{2} (291.2/sq mi)
- Time zone: UTC+8 (China Standard)
- Postal code: 744400
- Website: www.lingtai.gov.cn

Lingtai County (simplified Chinese: 灵台县; traditional Chinese: 靈台縣; pinyin: Língtái Xiàn) is a county in the southeast of Gansu province, China, bordering Shaanxi province to the south and east. It is under the administration of Pingliang City. Its postal code is 744400, and in 1999 its population was 226,576 people. It was first established in 605 AD.

Lingtai is named after the Lingtai acupuncture point, since one of the founders of acupuncture, Huangfu Mi, was born in Lingtai. In ancient history it was known as Mixu (密须).

== Administrative divisions ==
Lingtai County is divided to 1 Subdistrict, 9 towns 4 townships and 1 other.

Subdistricts

- Chengshi residential community (城市社区街道)

Towns

- Zhongtai (中台镇)
- Shaozhai (邵寨镇)
- Dudian (独店镇)
- Shizi (什字镇)
- Chaona (朝那镇)
- Xitun (西屯镇)
- Shangliang (上良镇)
- Baili (百里镇)
- Puwo (蒲窝镇)

Townships

- Xinkai Township (新开乡)
- Liangyuan Township (梁原乡)
- Longmen Township (龙门乡)
- Xinghuo Township (星火乡)

Others

- Wanbaochuan Farm (万宝川农场)

== Climate ==
Climate data for Lingtai, elevation 967 m (3,173 ft), (1991–2020 normals, extremes 1981–2010)
Month	Jan	Feb	Mar	Apr	May	Jun	Jul	Aug	Sep	Oct	Nov	Dec	Year
Record high °C (°F)	15.6 (60.1)	22.0 (71.6)	29.8 (85.6)	36.5 (97.7)	35.8 (96.4)	38.8 (101.8)	37.7 (99.9)	36.7 (98.1)	34.8 (94.6)	28.1 (82.6)	23.4 (74.1)	17.4 (63.3)	38.8 (101.8)
Mean daily maximum °C (°F)	4.4 (39.9)	8.5 (47.3)	15.4 (59.7)	21.5 (70.7)	25.5 (77.9)	29.2 (84.6)	30.3 (86.5)	28.2 (82.8)	22.8 (73.0)	17.6 (63.7)	11.7 (53.1)	5.7 (42.3)	18.4 (65.1)
Daily mean °C (°F)	−4.0 (24.8)	0.0 (32.0)	6.3 (43.3)	12.2 (54.0)	16.5 (61.7)	20.6 (69.1)	22.9 (73.2)	21.4 (70.5)	16.5 (61.7)	10.4 (50.7)	3.5 (38.3)	−2.7 (27.1)	10.3 (50.5)
Mean daily minimum °C (°F)	−9.7 (14.5)	−5.7 (21.7)	−0.6 (30.9)	4.6 (40.3)	9.2 (48.6)	13.9 (57.0)	17.4 (63.3)	17.0 (62.6)	12.7 (54.9)	6.0 (42.8)	−1.7 (28.9)	−8.1 (17.4)	4.6 (40.2)
Record low °C (°F)	−20.3 (−4.5)	−17.7 (0.1)	−11.3 (11.7)	−7.1 (19.2)	−0.8 (30.6)	5.0 (41.0)	9.2 (48.6)	8.8 (47.8)	2.4 (36.3)	−3.6 (25.5)	−14.6 (5.7)	−23.1 (−9.6)	−23.1 (−9.6)
Average precipitation mm (inches)	6.9 (0.27)	9.5 (0.37)	17.3 (0.68)	31.9 (1.26)	48.3 (1.90)	71.9 (2.83)	120.5 (4.74)	105.2 (4.14)	103.3 (4.07)	46.3 (1.82)	16.6 (0.65)	3.9 (0.15)	581.6 (22.88)
Average precipitation days (≥ 0.1 mm)	4.4	5.2	6.1	7.3	9.3	9.5	11.1	11.9	12.7	10.4	5.5	2.7	96.1
Average snowy days	6.4	5.9	2.4	0.4	0	0	0	0	0	0.2	2.6	4.7	22.6
Average relative humidity (%)	65	65	60	60	66	70	76	80	84	82	76	68	71
Mean monthly sunshine hours	150.6	147.7	192.3	209.5	218.4	213.6	205.5	169.3	119.4	127.9	147.3	159.8	2,061.3
Percentage possible sunshine	48	47	51	53	50	49	47	41	32	37	48	53	46
Source: China Meteorological Administration

== Born in Lingtai ==
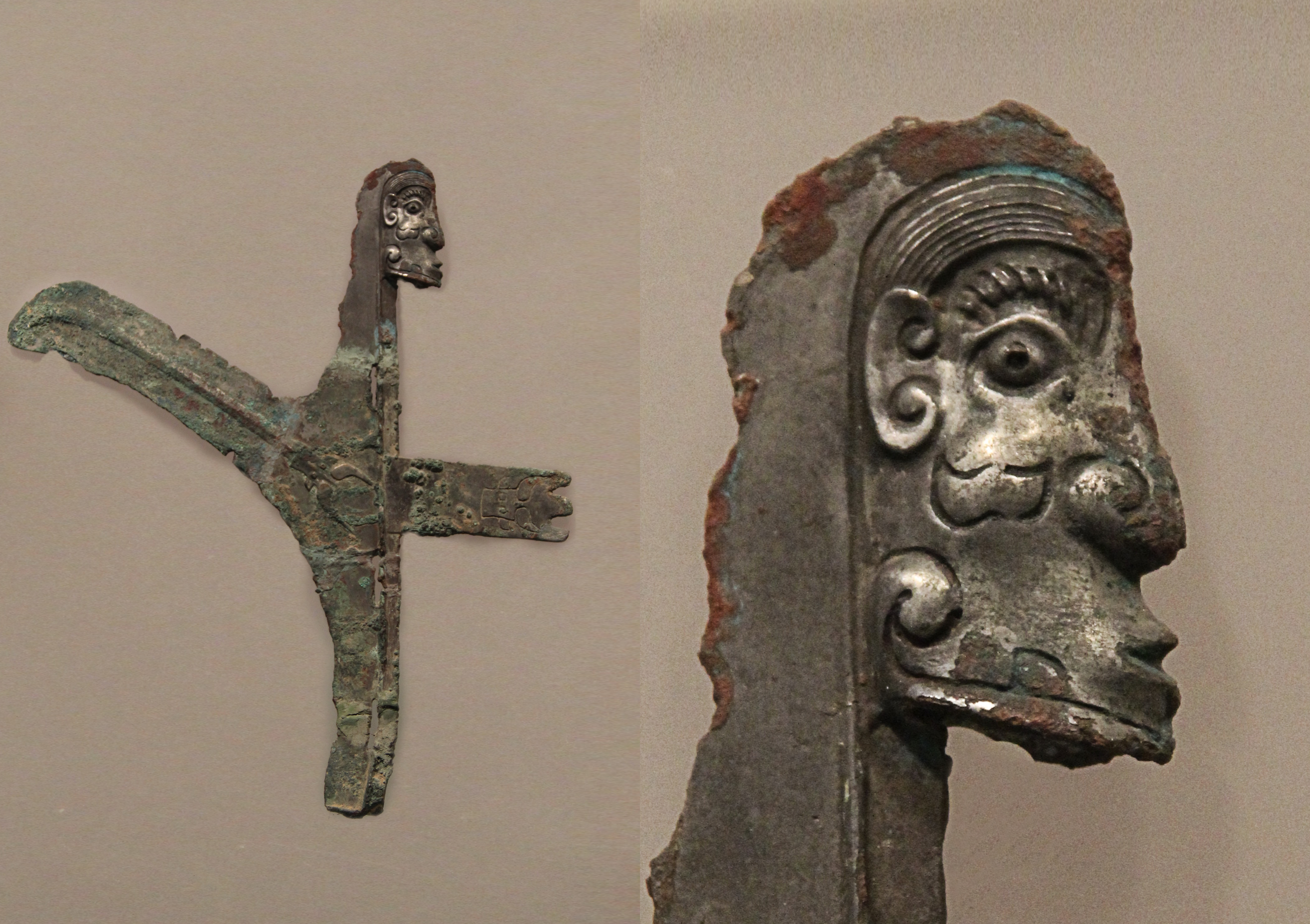
Anthropomorphic axe, bronze, excavated in Baicaopo, Lingtai County, Western Zhou period (1045–771 BCE)

- Huangfu Mi, author and physician
- Niu Sengru, government official during Tang era
- Yao Yuanjun, Chinese Border police officer

== See also ==
- List of administrative divisions of Gansu
