= Huan Huo =

Jin dynasty general

- 桓豁

Inspector of Jingzhou (荊州刺史)
- In office 365 – 377
- Monarchs: Emperor Fei of Jin; Emperor Jianwen of Jin; Emperor Xiaowu of Jin

Personal details
- Born: 320
- Died: 13 October 377
- Relations: Huan Wen (brother); Huan Chong (brother); Huan Xuan (nephew)
- Children: Huan Shiqian; Huan Shixiu; Huan Shimin; Huan Shisheng; Huan Shisui; Huan Shikang; 14 unnamed sons One unnamed daughter
- Parent: Huan Yi (father)
- Courtesy name: Langzi (朗子)
- Posthumous name: Jing (敬)

Huan Huo (320 - 13 October 377), courtesy name Langzi, was a Chinese military general of the Eastern Jin. He was the brother of Huan Wen and Huan Chong. Although not as influential as his two brothers, Huan Huo was one of the members of the Huan clan who held control over a province in Jingzhou after the death of Huan Wen. His sons such as Huan Shiqian and Huan Shixiu were also important members of the clan who earned merits under Huan Wen and Huan Chong's leadership. He fought against Former Qin forces expanding into Jin's western territories before dying in 377.

== Early career ==
Huan Huo was the third son of the Eastern Jin general Huan Yi, who died when Huo was only 8 years old. He first served as an Assistant Officer of the Household to the regent Sima Yu and later his libulang (吏部郎). Huan Huo resigned from the government due to illness but later returned to office when Huan Wen became Gentleman of the Yellow Gate in 361. Huan Huo became Chief Controller of seven commanderies along the Mian River as well as Administrator of Xinye and Yicheng. In May or June of that year, Huan Huo attacked Xuchang and captured it from Former Yan.

On 29 March 365, Huan Huo was further promoted to Chief of military affairs in Yicheng commandery of Jingzhou and Yangzhou, and Jingzhao commandery in Yongzhou, and acting Inspector of Jingzhou. He was also gifted staffs of authority together with his brother Huan Chong.

The following year in 366, Huan Huo quelled the rebellion of the Inspector of Liangzhou, Sima Xun. Later, he led troops against a raiding Former Qin army in Jingzhou led by Wang Meng, Yang An and Yao Chang. He was unable to reach them before they retreated and lost a portion of the people living along the Han River who were relocated to Qin. The general Zhao Yi (趙億) also rebelled at Wan that year, so Huan Huo and Luo Chong (羅崇) campaigned against him in 367. Huan Huo drove out Zhao Yi and captured the Yan general, Zhao Pan (趙盤).

== After Huan Wen's death ==
For the next six years, Huan Huo's brother Huan Wen schemed his way to claim the imperial throne, first through a failed campaign in Yan and then forcing Emperor Fei of Jin to abdicate. In August 373, Huan Wen died, never becoming emperor but leaving behind a state dominated by his clan. Huan Wen's domain were divided into three between Huan Chong, Huan Huo and Huo's son Huan Shixiu. On 29 August, Huan Huo was made General Who Conquers The West and Chief Controller of Jingzhou, Yangzhou, Yongzhou, Jiaozhou, and Guangzhou after his brother's death while the rest of the clan also received important positions.

Although the Huan clan now controlled most of southern China, it now faced a threat from Former Qin, whose ruler Fu Jian wanted to unify the whole of China proper. Qin forces invaded Yizhou and Liangzhou shortly after Huan Wen's death. Huan Huo attempted to save the provinces by sending Zhu Yao (竺瑤) but Zhu Yao could not advance after hearing that his ally Zhao Zhang (趙長) had already been killed. As a result, the provinces were swiftly taken by Qin in 373.

In 376, Huan Huo was promoted to Senior General Who Attacks the West and given the privilege of Separate Office, allowing him to appoint anyone without the court's permission. However, it was around this time that Huan Huo wanted to resign, stating his failure in saving Yizhou and Liangzhou for his reasoning, but the court denied. In 377, Huan Huo appointed Zhu Xu Inspector of Liangzhou and stationed him at Xiangyang. Huan Huo died not long after the same year and his titles were all given to his brother Huan Chong. He was posthumously named as 'Jing'.

== Anecdotes ==
=== Naming of sons ===
Huan Huo had a practice of naming his children with two-syllable names, all starting with the word 'stone' (shí, 石). This was due to a children's song around the time, which included the lyrics "Who is spoken of as strong, a stone will strike and smash (誰謂爾堅石打碎。)." The word 'strong' (jiān, 堅) is the same as Fu Jian's given name. Thus, Huan Huo prophesied that by naming his sons with 'shí', Fu Jian's demise would be certain. As a result, all 20 of his sons had the word 'shí' in their names, although only six were recorded. They were Huan Shiqian, Huan Shixiu, Huan Shimin, Huan Shisheng (桓石生), Huan Shisui (桓石綏) and Huan Shikang (桓石康).

=== Huan Huo's myna ===
Huan Huo was once presented a myna during his time as Inspector of Jingzhou. Following the customs of Chu, he cut the tip of its tongue on the fifth day of the fifth month and taught it how to mimic human speech. Eventually, it was able to name objects and respond to people. Huan Huo presented it to his staff members during a banquet and made it imitate whatever the guests were saying. The bird perfectly imitated the guests except for one, whose nose was stuffed from a cold that day. His nasal sound was too deep for the bird, but the myna was able to imitate him in the end after it placed its head inside an urn to mimic his voice.

During the banquet, one of the masters of ceremonies was stealing from Huan Huo's camp and was seen by the myna. The myna notified Huan Huo's men but though they noticed, they did not report it to Huan Huo. The thief soon came back to steal some beef. The myna caught him again and alerted the soldiers. This time the soldiers demanded proof, so the myna said "The man wrapped the beef with fresh lotus leaves, and hid it behind the folding screen." The soldiers went to inspect, and found the beef. The thief's stolen goods were confiscated, and he was punished. The thief hated the myna because of this, so he had it boiled alive. Huan Huo became depressed, and his men urged him to kill the thief. However, Huan Huo said, "For the crimes inflicted on the myna, he should compensate it with his own life. But in the end, we must not forsake the law and punish one by death over a bird." Instead, Huan Huo imprisoned him for five years.
