= Cha'an =

Cha'an 茶庵镇
- Town
- Interactive map of Cha'an
- Coordinates: 32°04′26″N 116°46′01″E
- Country: People's Republic of China
- Province: Anhui
- Prefecture-level city: Lu'an
- County: Shou
- Time zone: UTC+8 (China Standard)

Cha'an (Chinese: 茶庵; pinyin: Chá'ān) is a town of Shou County in central Anhui province, China. It has 1 residential community (社区) and 7 villages under its administration.
