= Chaona =

Coordinates: 35°06′N 107°13′E

Chaona 朝那镇
- Town
- Interactive map of Chaona
- Country: China
- Province: Gansu
- City: Pingliang
- County: Lingtai

Area
  - Total: 128 km^{2} (49 sq mi)

Population
  - Total: 19,569

Chaona is a town of Lingtai County, Pingliang, Gansu, China. The town was historically known as Dongchaona (东朝那) and Anding Chaona (安定朝那). It is the birthplace of Huangfu Mi, founder of Chinese acupuncture. During the Western Wei (535 to 557) dynasty, it was the seat of Anwu County and Chaona County, where it served as a resource distribution center and military base.
