= Dashun, Anhui =

Dashun 大顺镇
- Town
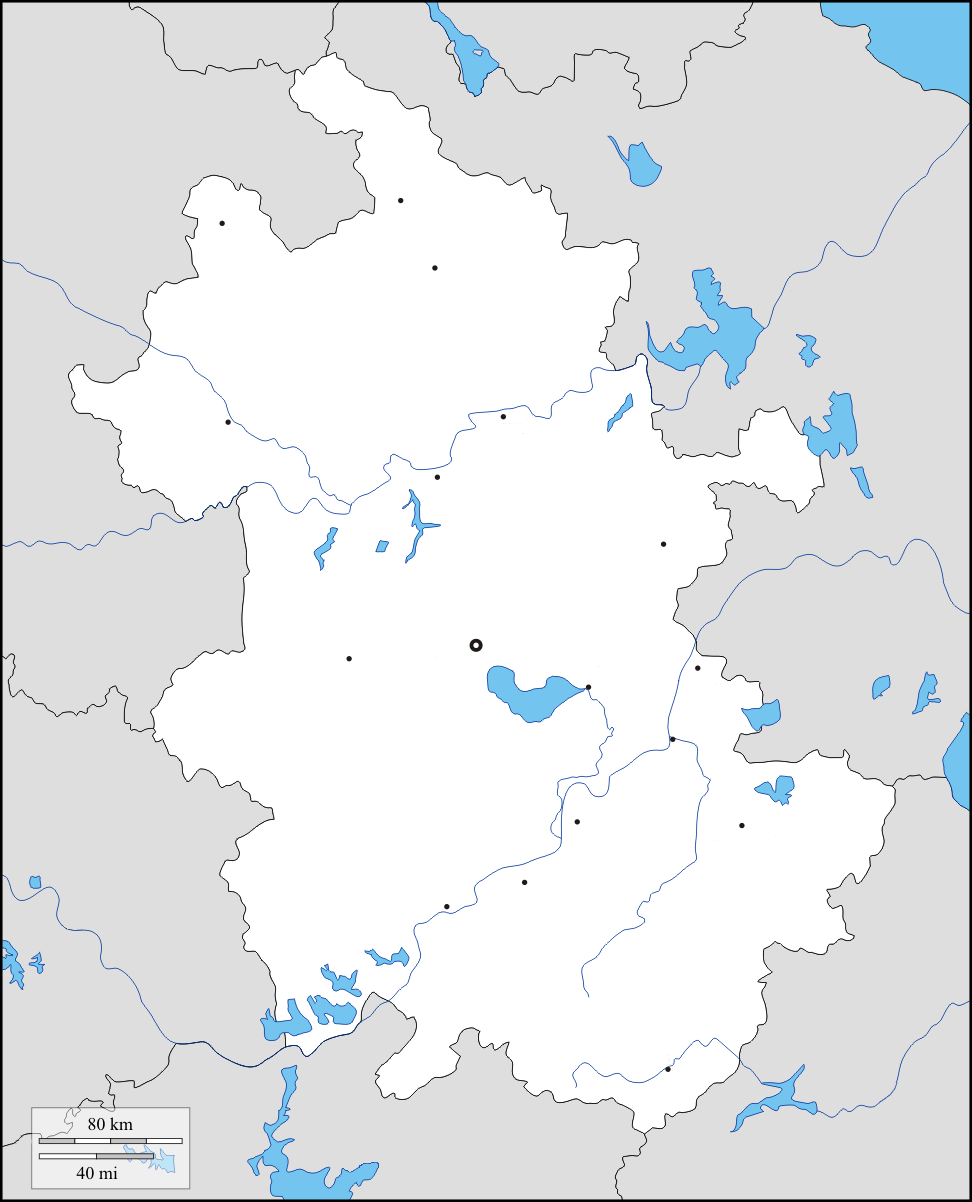
- Location in Anhui
- Coordinates: 32°21′21″N 117°0′51″E
- Country: People's Republic of China
- Province: Anhui
- Prefectural city: Huainan
- County: Shou County
- Time zone: UTC+8 (China Standard)

Dashun (simplified Chinese: 大顺; traditional Chinese: 大順; pinyin: Dàshùn) is a town under the administration of Shou County, Anhui, China. As of 2023, it administers Dashun Avenue Residential Community (大顺街道) and the following nine villages:

- Xinji Village (新集村)
- Yubu Village (余埠村)
- Taoxiang Village (陶巷村)
- Jiujing Village (九井村)
- Guantang Village (官塘村)
- Laozui Village (老嘴村)
- Yuanhu Village (袁湖村)
- Changgang Village (长岗村)
- Chouji Village (仇集村)
