= Yinghe =

Yinghe 迎河镇
- Town
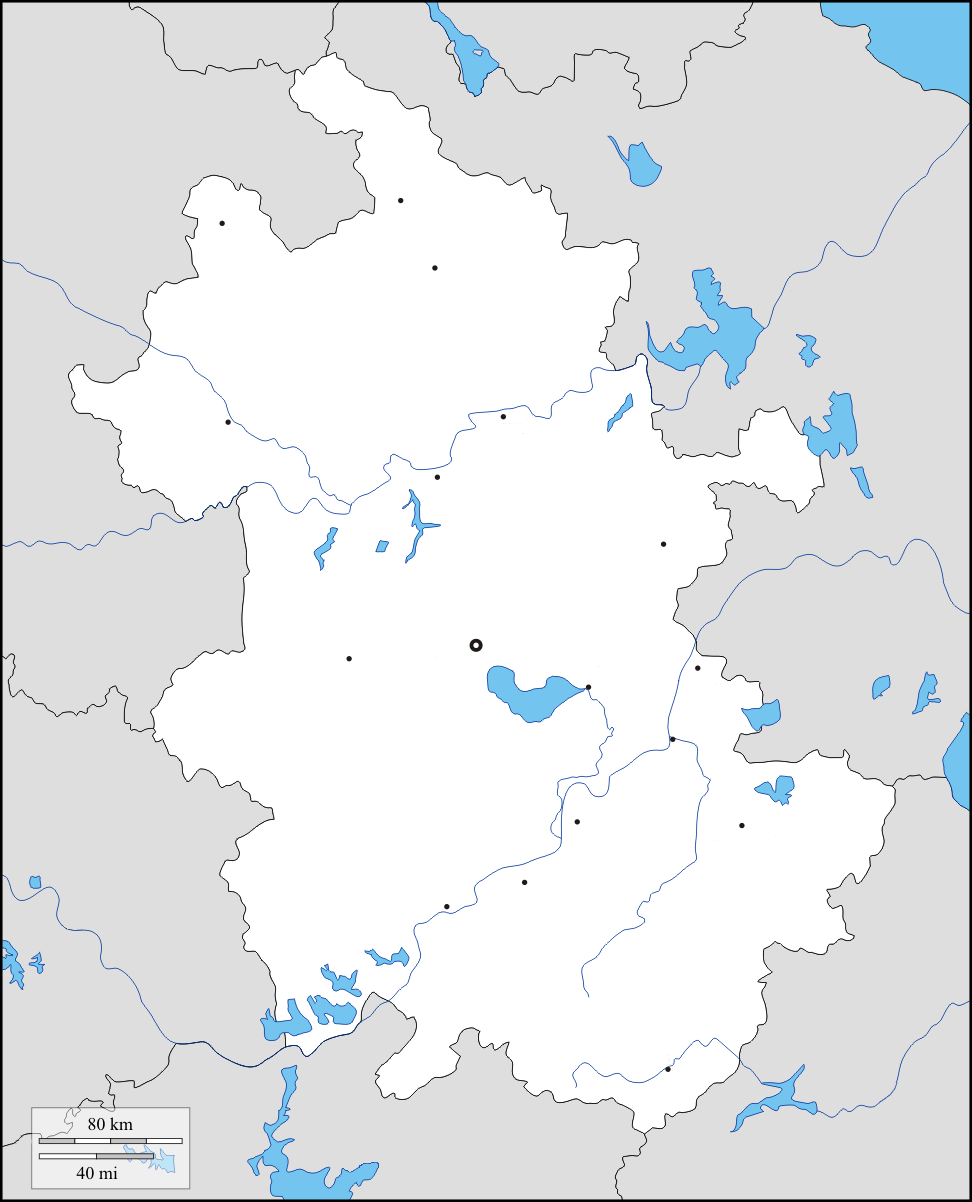
- Location in Anhui
- Coordinates: 32°17′14″N 116°32′16″E
- Country: People's Republic of China
- Province: Anhui
- Prefecture-level city: Huainan
- County: Shou County
- Time zone: UTC+8 (China Standard)

Yinghe (Chinese: 迎河; pinyin: Yínghé) is a town under the administration of Shou County, Anhui, China. As of 2023, it administers the following two street residential communities and twelve villages:

- Tuanjie Jiedao (团结街道)
- Lixin Jiedao (立新街道)
- Dadian Village (大店村)
- Litai Village (李台村)
- Wafang Village (瓦房村)
- Xiaoyan Village (肖严村)
- Datai Village (大台村)
- Shuangbei Village (双碑村)
- Yulin Village (禹临村)
- Zhuci Village (朱祠村)
- Jiuliu Village (酒流村)
- Xinqiang Village (新墙村)
- Yulou Village (余楼村)
- Changwei Village (常圩村)
