= Shouchun, Anhui =

Town in Anhui, China

Shouchun 寿春镇
- Town
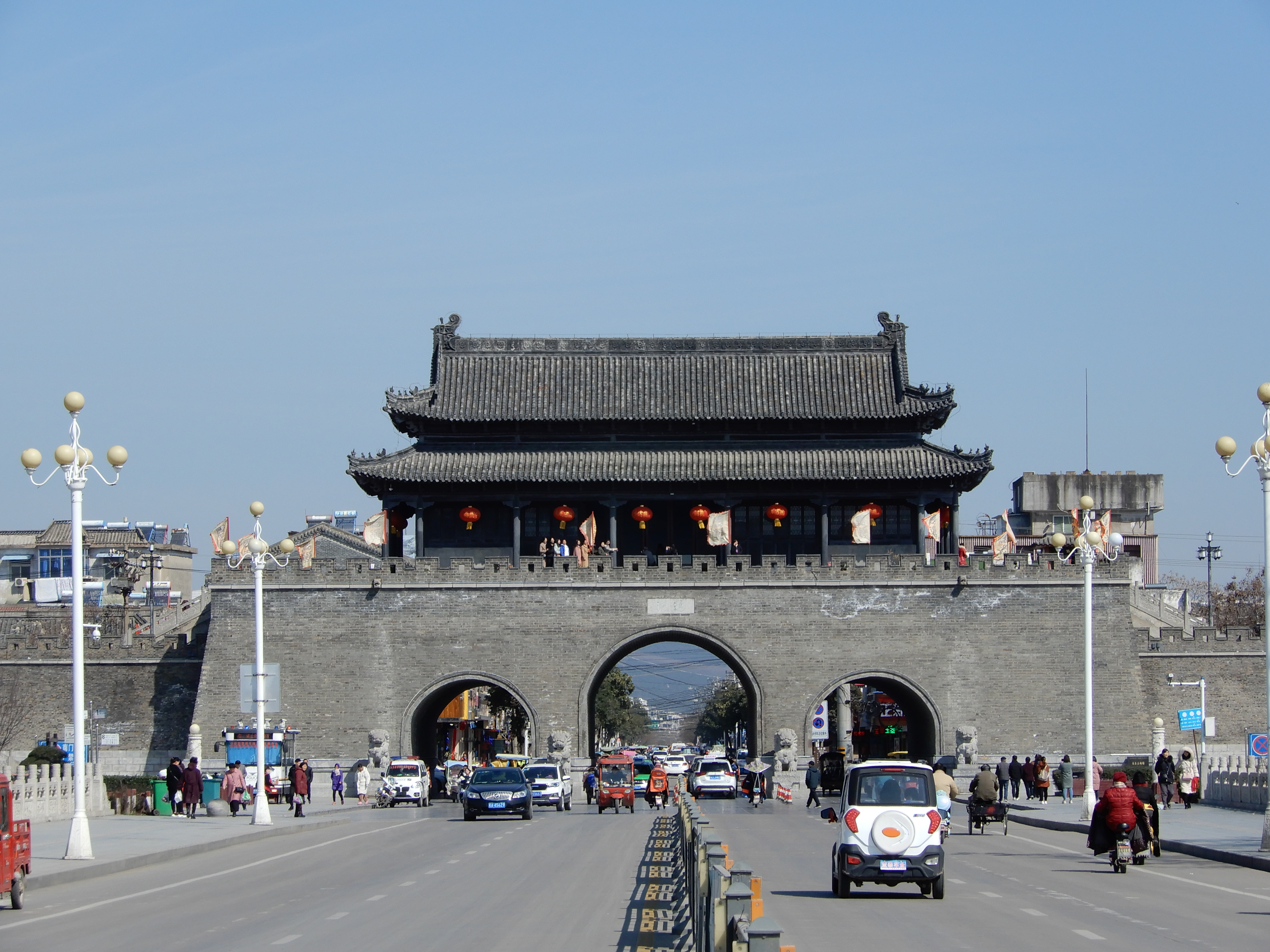
- Shou County City Wall in Shouchun
- Interactive map of Shouchun
- Coordinates: 32°34′43″N 116°46′41″E
- Country: People's Republic of China
- Province: Anhui
- Prefecture-level city: Huainan
- County: Shou
- Time zone: UTC+8 (China Standard)

Shouchun (Chinese: 寿春镇) is a town and the seat as well as the political, cultural, and economic center of Shou County, Huainan, Anhui. The town is located on the south bank of the Huai River, backed by Bagong Mountain. The town has a total area of 140 square kilometers and a total population of 132,000.

Shouchun is divided into Nanguan Community, Hongxing Community, Jianshe Community, Xinmin Community, Mingzhu Community, Yongqing Community, Dongjin Community, Nanguan Ethnic Village, Jiulong Ethnic Village, Huayuan Village, Zhouzhai Village, Shoubin Village, Gucheng Village, Doujian Village, Xinglong Village and Huguang Village.

The town was once the ancient capital of the Chu State, with a long history and rich tourist resources. It has a well-preserved ancient city wall from the Song dynasty, the largest Islamic mosque in East China, the Buddhist Bao'en Temple, the Chu Culture Museum, the Palace of the Emperor Bagongshan.
