= Huangfu Mi =

Chinese scholar and physician (215–282)

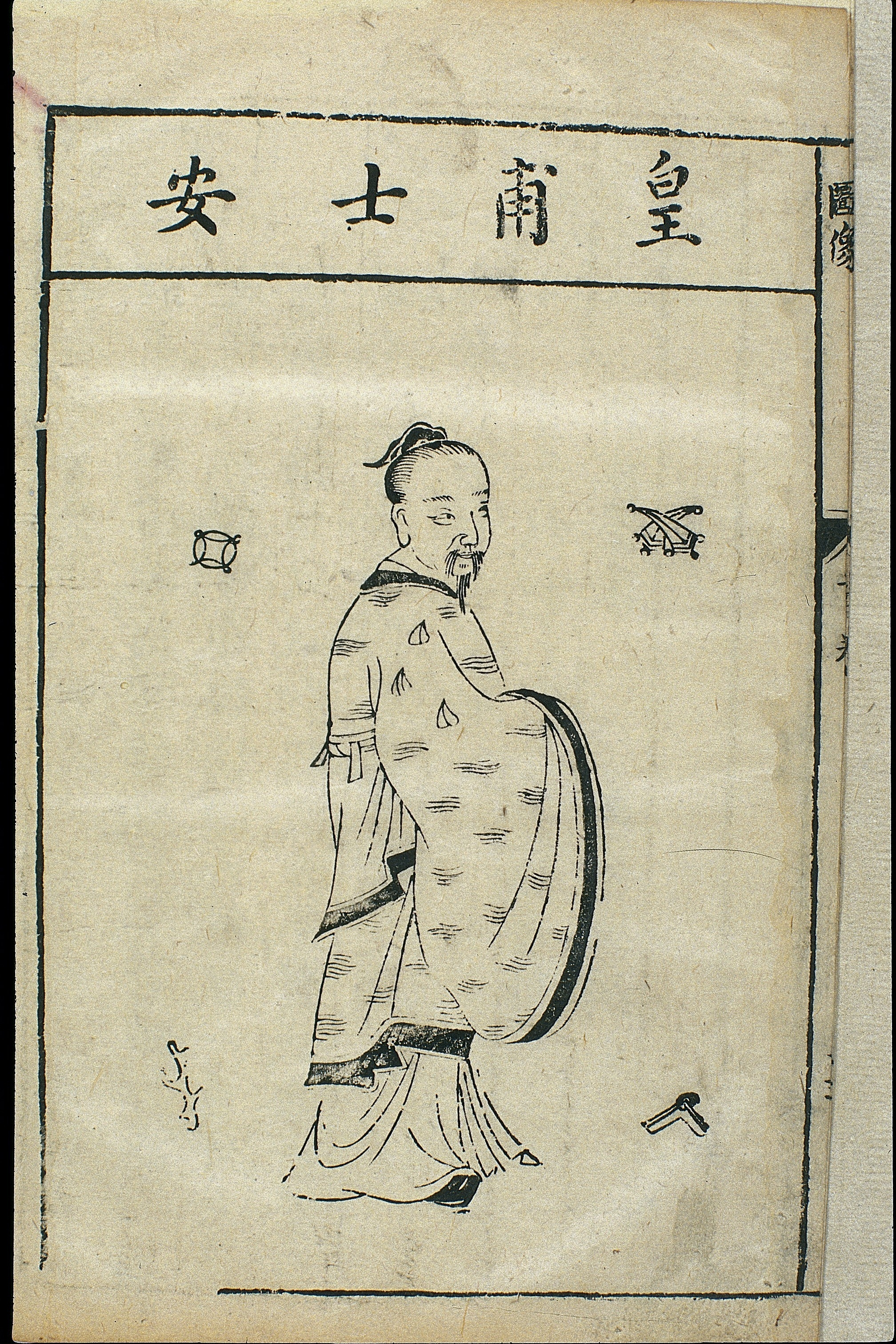
- Chinese woodcut, Famous medical figures; Huangfu Mi, Wellcome Collection L0039322
- Traditional Chinese: 皇甫謐
- Simplified Chinese: 皇甫谧
Transcriptions
Standard Mandarin
- Hanyu Pinyin: Huángfǔ Mì
- Wade–Giles: Huangfu Mi
Yue: Cantonese
- Yale Romanization: Wòhng-pou Maht
- Jyutping: Wong^{4}-pou^{2} Mat^{6}
Southern Min
- Hokkien POJ: Hông-hú Bi̍t
Middle Chinese
- Middle Chinese: Hwang-pjú Mjit
Old Chinese
- Baxter–Sagart (2014): *ɢʷˤang-p(r)aʔ Mit

Huangfu Mi (c. 215 – 282), courtesy name Shi'an (Chinese: 士安), was a Chinese scholar, historian, physician, and writer of the Cao Wei and Western Jin periods. He was born in a poor farming family in present-day Sanli village, Chaona, Pingliang, despite being a great-grandson of the famous Eastern Han general Huangfu Song, via Song's son Huangfu Shuxian.

== Notable works ==
Between 256 and 260, toward the end of the state of Cao Wei, he compiled the Canon of Acupuncture and Moxibustion (simplified Chinese: 针灸甲乙经; traditional Chinese: 針灸甲乙經; pinyin: Zhēnjiǔ jiǎyǐ jīng; Wade–Giles: Chen^{1}-chiu^{3} chia^{3}-i^{3} ching^{1}), a collection of various texts on acupuncture written in earlier periods. This book in 12 volumes further divided into 128 chapters was one of the earliest systematic works on acupuncture and moxibustion, and it proved to be one of the most influential.

Huangfu Mi also compiled Chronicle of Emperors and Kings (Chinese: 帝王世紀; pinyin: Dìwáng shìjì) in ten volumes (Chinese: 卷; pinyin: juǎn), a historical work concerning the rulers and genealogical traditions of early China. He was also the coauthor of Biographies of Exemplary Women (Chinese: 列女傳; pinyin: Liènǚ Zhuàn) and the author of Biographies of Exemplary Gentlemen (Chinese:高士傳; pinyin: Gāoshì Zhuàn).

== Diwang Shiji ==
Among Huangfu Mi's historical writings was the Diwang Shiji (帝王世紀; Dìwáng Shìjì, “Chronicle of Emperors and Kings”), originally arranged in ten juan. The work traced rulers, dynastic genealogies, chronology, geography, and related traditions from remote antiquity through the Han and Wei periods. Huangfu Mi drew extensively upon earlier classical, historical, and other writings, including sources that themselves subsequently disappeared.

The Diwang Shiji continued to circulate for several centuries after Huangfu Mi's death. Bibliographical records of the Sui and Tang dynasties list the work in ten juan, while the Song shi records a nine-juan version. According to the preface preserved with a later reconstruction, the complete work could still be consulted during the Southern Song dynasty but ceased to circulate as a complete text toward the end of the Song period. Its contents nevertheless survived on a considerable scale because passages from it had been quoted in numerous later histories, encyclopaedias, commentaries, geographical works, and other compilations. These scattered quotations subsequently formed the basis for attempts to reconstruct the lost work.

Several scholars produced reconstructed editions from these surviving quotations. Important Qing-period reconstructions include those associated with Song Xiangfeng, Qian Baotang, and Zhang Shu. The twentieth-century scholar Xu Zongyuan produced the more extensive Diwang Shiji jicun (帝王世紀輯存), published by Zhonghua Shuju in 1964. The transmission and recovery of the text also benefited from materials preserved and studied in Japan, where Chinese works and textual witnesses no longer readily available in China formed an important part of the broader scholarly tradition concerned with the reconstruction of early Chinese literature. Xu's 1964 reconstruction is itself held by the National Diet Library of Japan.

In 2026, Alexander Cárdenas published the English translation Chronicle of Emperors and Kings (Diwang Shiji 帝王世紀). The edition presents the reconstructed text in English together with parallel textual witnesses and scholarly apparatus, drawing on Chinese transmitted materials as well as Japanese-preserved textual and bibliographical sources relevant to the recovery and study of the work. It also includes an introductory study of Huangfu Mi's life, writings, intellectual background, and the transmission, preservation, and reconstruction of the Diwang Shiji, making material concerning both Huangfu Mi and the work available to an English-language readership.

== See also ==
- Lists of people of the Three Kingdoms
