= Sima Xun =

Jin dynasty general and warlord

- 司馬勳

Inspector of Liangzhou (梁州刺史)
- In office 344 – 365
- Monarch: Emperor Kang of Jin/Emperor Mu of Jin/Emperor Ai of Jin

King of Chengdu (self-appointed) (成都王)
- In office 365 – 366

Personal details
- Born: 306
- Died: c.July 366
- Relations: Sima Xún (great-great grandfather; self-declared); Linghu Ni (adoptive father)
- Children: Sima Kang
- Parent: Sima Guan (Note: The Book of Jin did not have a biography for Sima Guan, and his lineage cannot be determined. The work recorded that Sima Ji (司马缉), second son of Sima Sui, died without issue in battle against Wang Jun, and his Princedom of Zhongshan was allowed to lapse; this battle likely took place in September or October 304. The 8th month of the 1st year of the Yong'xing era corresponds to 16 Sep to 15 Oct 304 in the Julian calendar. Emperor Hui's biography also recorded that Sima Dan (司马耽), elder brother of Sima Ji, died on 8 Oct 292 (yi'you day of the 9th month of the 2nd year of the Yuan'kang era), whereas Dan's biography recorded that he died without issue in 277, the same year where he was made Prince of Zhongshan.) (father)
- Courtesy name: Weichang (偉長)

Sima Xun (306 – c.July 366), courtesy name Weichang, was a military general and warlord of the Chinese Eastern Jin dynasty. Following the destruction of the Han-Zhao dynasty in 329, Sima Xun fled south to the Eastern Jin based in Jiankang, where he grew to hold both military and provincial power. Based in Liangzhou, he participated in a series of northern expeditions in the mid-4th century but was ultimately unsuccessful. Sima Xun was cruel and ambitious, and in 365, he rebelled in hopes of claiming independence in Liangzhou. However, his rebellion was quelled by Zhu Xu in a matter of months, and he was subsequently executed by Huan Wen.

== Early life and career ==
Sima Xun claimed to be the great-great-grandson of Sima Xún (司馬恂), a brother of Sima Yi. He was nine years old (Note: The term used in Book of Jin (年十馀岁）is ambiguous and could mean that Sima Xun was then in his teens.) and living in Chang'an in 316 when the city fell to Han-Zhao forces led by Liu Yao that year. Liu Yao's general, Linghu Ni (令狐泥) discovered Sima Xun and decided to adopt him as his own son. Growing up under Linghu Ni, he learnt to ride horses and excelled in archery, so much so that he was capable of firing a bow with either one of his hands.

Han-Zhao was destroyed by its rival state Later Zhao in 329. Xun was able to escape the Guanzhong region and made his way to Jiangnan. In 331, he arrived in Jiankang, where a branch of the Sima clan had relocated and made it their dynasty's new capital. There, he declared "I am the great-great-grandson of the Empress's Chamberlain, Xun, the great-grandson of the Champion General and Prince Hui of Jinan, Sui, and the son of the Administrator of Lueyang, Guan." The imperial court believed him and welcomed him back, making him Supervisor of the Internuncios. Despite being acknowledged as a Sima, he was never given a princely title throughout his time in Jin.

His first recorded activity as a Jin general was in 336, when he was sent to attack the Cheng-Han dynasty at Hanzhong, but was defeated by the Cheng general, Li Shou. By 344, he had grown to become an Army Adviser under Yu Yi. That year, after the Inspector of Liangzhou Huan Xuan (桓宣) died, Yu Yi requested the Jin court to replace him with Sima Xun. In 347, the general Huan Wen conquered Cheng-Han and reclaimed the lost parts of Yizhou and Liangzhou for Jin. After this event, Sima Xun's territory and influence expanded.

== Northern expeditions ==
=== First northern expedition ===
In autumn 349, the Later Zhao in northern China was undergoing a rapid decline following the death of their emperor, Shi Hu. His successor, Shi Shi, was deposed in a coup by his brother Shi Zun just a month into his reign, prompting his other brothers to challenge his claim. The Jin court was in favour in launching an expedition to reclaim lost northern territory, and soon after, Sima Xun received an invitation by the people of Yongzhou to overthrow the Zhao prince, Shi Bao (石苞) in the northwest.

Sima Xun marched through the Luo Valley (駱谷; southwest of present-day Zhouzhi County, Shaanxi) and captured Changcheng. He camped at Xuangou (懸鈎) before sending his general Liu Huan (劉煥) to capture the ancient capital of Chang'an. Along the way, Liu Huan killed the Zhao Administrator of Jingzhao, Liu Xiuli (劉秀離) and captured Hecheng (賀城, in present-day Zhouzhi County, Shaanxi). The local populace then began killing any Zhao officials they could find and welcomed the Jin forces.

Shi Bao at the time was planning to campaign against Shi Zun in the east, but with Jin forces encroaching, he called off his plans and sent his generals, Ma Qiu and Yao Guo (姚国) to repel Sima Xun. Shi Zun also sent Wang Lang with 20,000 elite cavalries to help Shi Bao, and Xun, feeling that the Zhao forces had him outnumbered, decided not to advance. When winter came, he decided to retreat. Along the way, in c.November, he captured the city of Wancheng from Zhao and killed their Administrator of Nanyang, Yuan Jing (袁景) before returning to his base in Liangzhou.

=== Second northern expedition ===
In 351, two natives of the Guanzhong region, Du Hong and Zhang Ju took advantage of the Zhao military's absence to seize control over Chang'an. However, they were soon ousted by the Di general, Fu Jian, who established his state Former Qin while they fled to Sizhu (司竹; southeast of present-day Zhouzhi County, Shaanxi) The two men requested assistance from Sima Xun, so in April or May, he marched north again with 30,000 soldiers. Fu Jian personally went to face his forces at Wuzhang Plains and repeatedly defeated him. Sima Xun eventually retreated to Nanzheng before returning to Hanzhong.

Meanwhile, Du Hong and Zhang Ju fell out with each other at Yiqiu (宜秋; located south of the Zhengguo Canal in Shaanxi). Du considered his family superior to Zhang's and constantly berated him. Angered, Zhang ordered his men to injure Du. Du knew how much Xun was worried of Zhang's power, and so managed to persuade him to kill Zhang. In 352, Sima Xun pretended to invite Zhang Ju over to meet him but instead had him arrested and executed. Zhang Ju's brother (whose name was not recorded) attacked Sima Xun, but the two agreed to a truce and Sima Xun returned south. Du declared himself King of Qin, but he was killed by Fu Jian's forces not long after. (Note: This is based on the account in Sima Xun's biography in the Book of Jin. Fu Jian's biography in the same record tells a completely different account with no mention of Sima Xun nor of Zhang's unnamed brother. In Fu Jian's version, the role of Du and Zhang had been roughly switched. The reason for their fallout remains the same but it was Zhang who killed Du and declared himself King of Qin. Zhang was also killed by Fu Jian's forces shortly after.)

== Later campaigns ==
=== Xiao Jingwen's rebellion ===
Previously in 347, a Jin general by the name of Xiao Jingwen (蕭敬文) had rebelled in Fucheng and declared himself King of Chengdu, stirring trouble in Baxi (巴西; around present-day Langzhong, Sichuan) and Hanzhong. The Inspector of Yizhou, Zhou Fu (周撫) (Note: son of Zhou Fang) campaigned against him for the next five years but could not capture his capital. In late 352, Huan Wen sent Sima Xun to help Zhou Fu, and the two generals finally managed to kill Xiao Jingwen and put down his rebellion.

=== Huan Wen's 1st northern expedition ===
In March 354, Huan Wen launched his first northern expedition in collaboration with Sima Xun and Former Liang. Sima Xun harassed Qin through the Ziwu Valley (子午谷; east of present-day Yang County, Shaanxi) while Liang's general, Wang Zhuo captured the city of Chencang . Huan Wen defeated Qin in the early stages of the Battle of Bailu Plains, so the Qin commander Fu Xiong shifted his focus to retaking areas in the west. Fu Xiong routed Sima Xun, causing him to retreat to Fort Nüwa (女媧堡). Fu Xiong then returned to Bailu Plains, where this time he defeated Huan Wen and forced him to turn back. Sima Xun faced Fu Xiong again at Chencang together with Wang Zhuo, but they too were defeated. Xun retreated to Hanzhong while Wang fled to Lueyang, officially ending the expedition in failure.

== Rebellion and death ==
For the next decade, Sima Xun remained in Liangzhou, seeing little to no action at all. He was cruel in administrating his province and was prone to killing his critics regardless of their positions. Sometimes, he would personally carry out their executions, using a bow and arrow to kill them. More worrying to some was that he had ambitions to break away from the state. Huan Wen knew of this and tried to appease Xun by making his son, Sima Kang (司馬康), the Administrator of Hanzhong. However, this was not enough to dissuade Xun.

Sima Xun was fearful of the Inspector of Yizhou, Zhou Fu, when he was alive, but after Zhou died on 20 July 365, Xun began planning his rebellion. His officers, Yong Duan (雍端) and Kui Cui (隗粹) were against this but Sima Xun had them both killed. In November 365, he declared himself Governor of Liangzhou and Yizhou and the King of Chengdu before attacking Fucheng. The city was abandoned by Guanqiu Wei (毌丘暐), so Sima Xun swiftly captured it before marching on to Chengdu and besieging the new Inspector of Yizhou, Zhou Chu (周楚; son of Zhou Fu) on 14 December.

Huan Wen responded by sending his general, Zhu Xu to lift the siege. His brother, Huan Huo, also sent his general Huan Pi (桓羆) to attack Nanzheng to help in the campaign against Sima Xun. In the middle of 366, Zhu Xu arrived at Chengdu, where he and Zhou Fu jointly attacked Sima Xun's army. Sima Xun's soldiers scattered, and soon after Xun and his officials were all captured by Zhu. Zhu Xu handed them over to Huan Wen, who had them beheaded and sent their heads to Jiankang.
