= Shou County =

Shouxian 寿县
- County
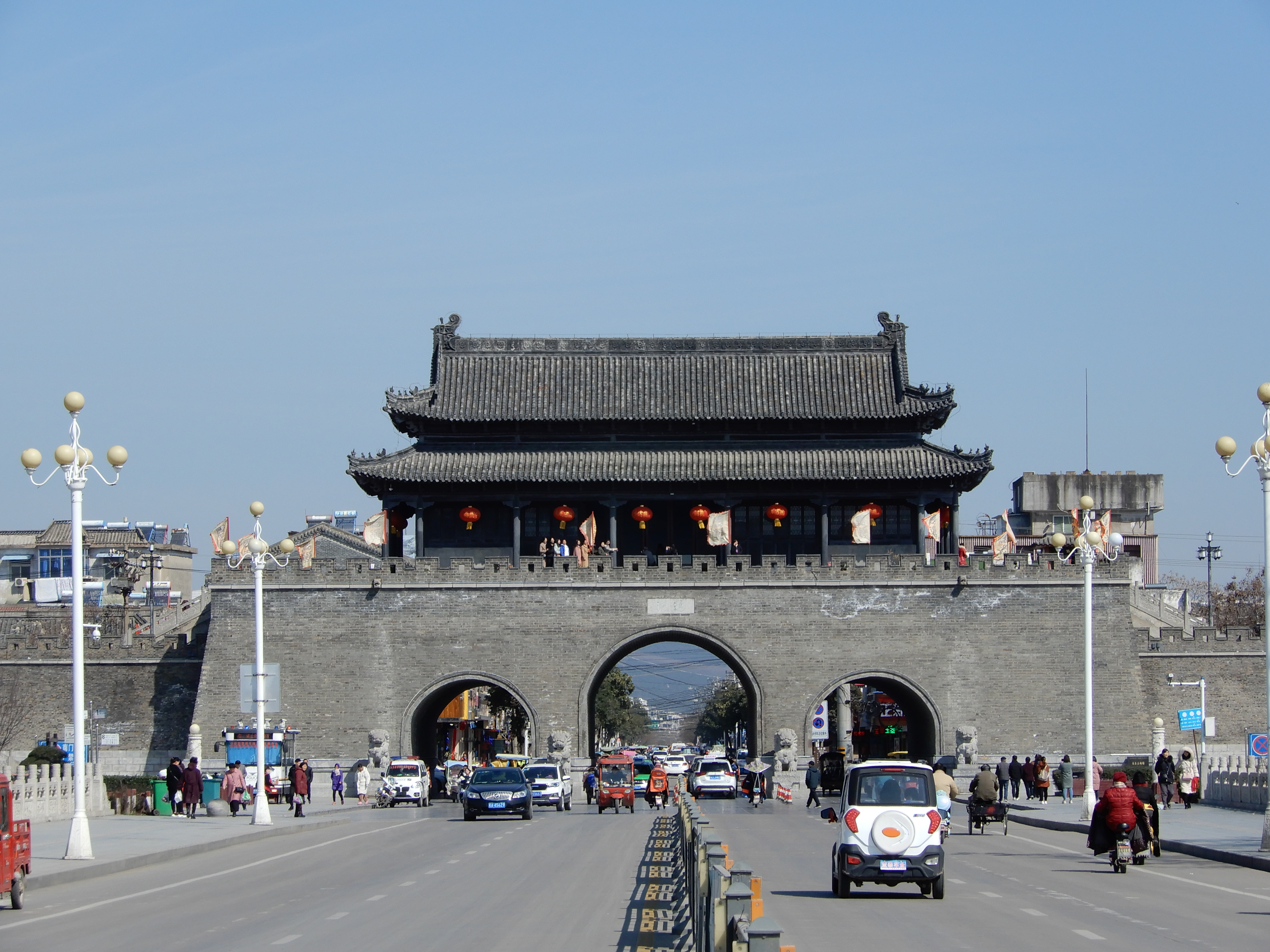
- Tongfei Gate of the city wall

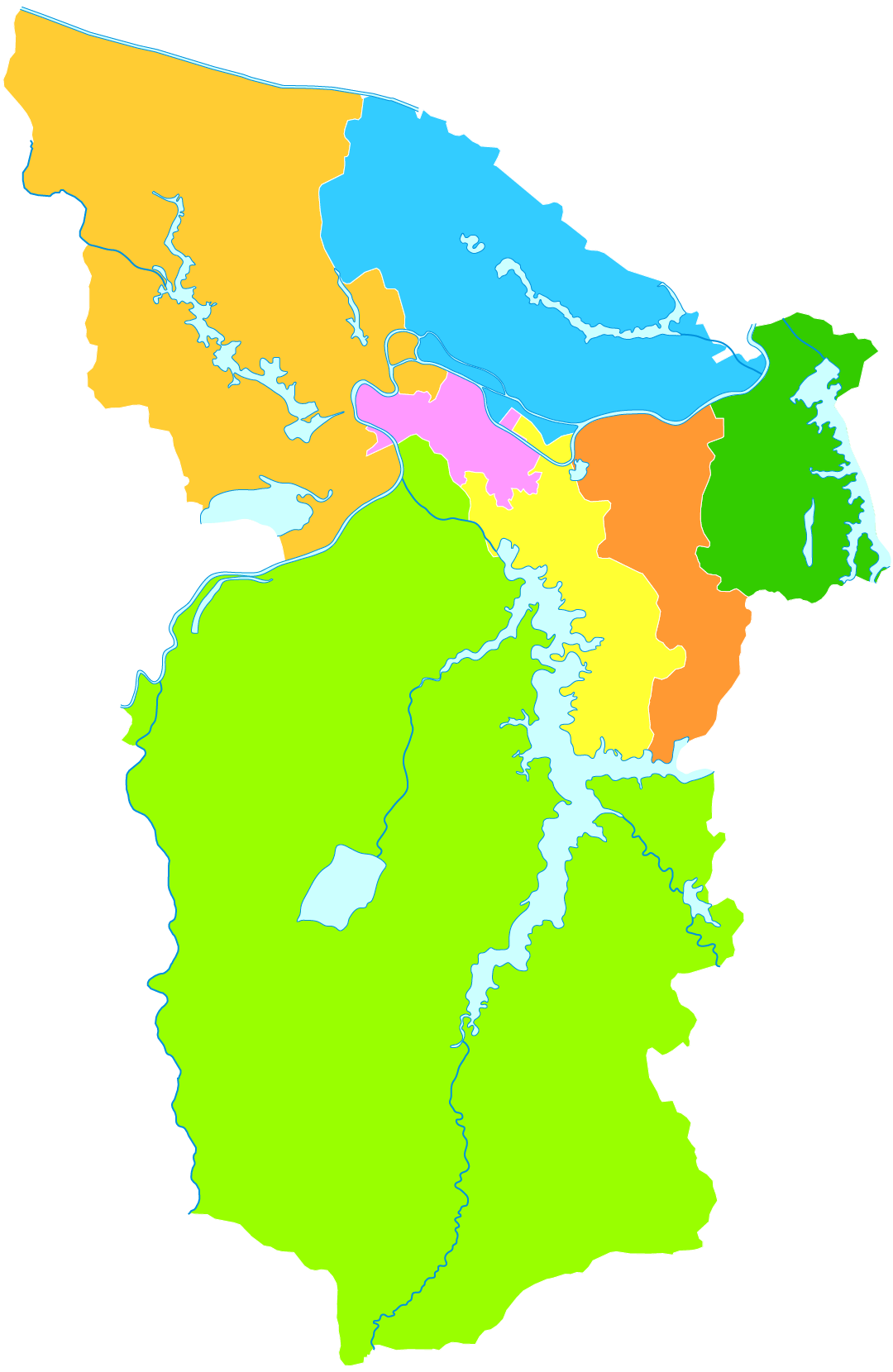
- Shou County is the southernmost division in this map of Huainan

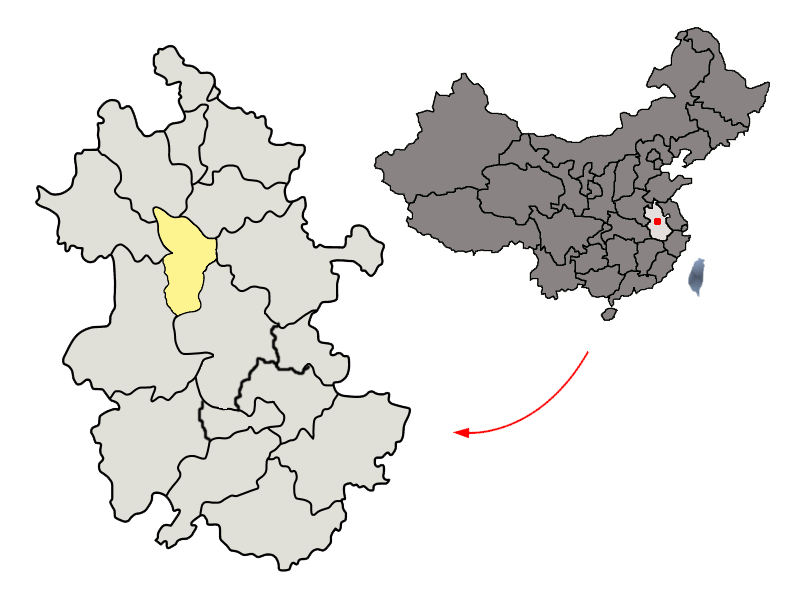
- Huainan in Anhui
- Coordinates: 32°32′42″N 116°47′54″E
- Country: China
- Province: Anhui
- Prefecture-level city: Huainan
- County seat: Shouchun Town

Area
  - Total: 2,986 km^{2} (1,153 sq mi)

Population (2020)
  - Total: 838,507
  - Density: 280.8/km^{2} (727.3/sq mi)
- Time zone: UTC+8 (China Standard)
- Postal code: 232200

Shou County or Shouxian (simplified Chinese: 寿县; traditional Chinese: 壽縣; pinyin: Shòu Xiàn) is a county in the north-central part of Anhui Province, China, and is located on the southern (right) bank of the Huai River. It is the southernmost county-level division of the prefecture-level city of Huainan. Its population is 1,280,000 and its area is 2,986 km^{2} (1,153 sq mi). It is a National Cultural and Historical City. The jurisdiction of Shou County was transferred 3 December 2015 from Lu'an to Huainan.

Shou County has jurisdiction over 17 towns, 7 townships and 1 ethnic township. The seat of Shou County is Shouchun.

== History ==
Shou, formerly known as Shouchun (壽春) and Shouyang (壽陽), was the last capital of the State of Chu from 241 BCE, after the Chu royal court fled in advance of the sack of the previous capital Chen (陳), by the growing power of the kingdom of Qin, on its way to imperial ascendency. King You of Chu was buried in Shou County, though his tomb was destroyed by warlords in the 1930s. From the time of the Qin dynasty to the Three Kingdoms period, the county fell under the jurisdiction of Jiujiang Commandery (九江郡). It was also the site of the crowning of Yuan Shu during the Three Kingdoms. During the Jin dynasty, the Battle of Fei River also occurred within the borders of Shou. Shou became renowned throughout China for its pottery during the Sui and Tang dynasties. Shou was besieged during the Five Dynasties and Ten Kingdoms period. The county also produced many well-known officials during the Song dynasty, including multiple Prime Ministers and ministers. During the Taiping Rebellion in the later years of the Qing dynasty, Chen Yucheng was captured in Shou.

== Administrative divisions ==
In the present, Shou County has 22 towns, 2 townships and 1 ethnic township.

21 towns

- Shouchun (寿春镇)
- Shuangqiao (双桥镇)
- Liugang (刘岗镇)
- Jiangou (涧沟镇)
- Banqiao (板桥镇)
- Baoyi (保义镇)
- Anfeng (安丰镇)
- Anfengtang (安丰塘镇)
- Xiaodian (小甸镇)
- Dashun (大顺镇)
- Zhongxing (众兴镇)
- Yanliu (炎刘镇)
- Wabu (瓦埠镇)
- Zhengyangguan (正阳关镇)
- Shikou (堰口镇)
- Shuangmiaoji (双庙集镇)
- Yinxian (隐贤镇)
- Fengzhuang (丰庄镇)
- Sanjue (三觉镇)
- Cha'an (茶庵镇)
- Yinghe (迎河镇)
- Yaokou (窑口镇)

3 townships

- Zhangli (张李乡)
- Bagongshan (八公山乡)

1 Ethnic township

- Taodian Hui Ethnic Township (陶店回族乡)

== Climate ==
Climate data for Shouxian, elevation 26 m (85 ft), (1991–2020 normals, extremes 1981–present)
Month	Jan	Feb	Mar	Apr	May	Jun	Jul	Aug	Sep	Oct	Nov	Dec	Year
Record high °C (°F)	20.2 (68.4)	26.7 (80.1)	33.6 (92.5)	33.7 (92.7)	36.7 (98.1)	37.7 (99.9)	39.0 (102.2)	37.6 (99.7)	37.2 (99.0)	34.2 (93.6)	29.8 (85.6)	23.4 (74.1)	39.0 (102.2)
Mean daily maximum °C (°F)	6.7 (44.1)	9.8 (49.6)	15.0 (59.0)	21.5 (70.7)	27.0 (80.6)	31.3 (88.3)	32.3 (90.1)	31.1 (88.0)	27.7 (81.9)	22.6 (72.7)	15.8 (60.4)	9.1 (48.4)	20.8 (69.5)
Daily mean °C (°F)	2.0 (35.6)	4.7 (40.5)	9.6 (49.3)	15.9 (60.6)	21.5 (70.7)	25.9 (78.6)	28.0 (82.4)	27.0 (80.6)	22.7 (72.9)	17.1 (62.8)	10.3 (50.5)	4.1 (39.4)	15.7 (60.3)
Mean daily minimum °C (°F)	−1.7 (28.9)	0.6 (33.1)	4.8 (40.6)	10.9 (51.6)	16.5 (61.7)	21.2 (70.2)	24.5 (76.1)	23.8 (74.8)	18.9 (66.0)	12.7 (54.9)	5.9 (42.6)	0.1 (32.2)	11.5 (52.7)
Record low °C (°F)	−15.4 (4.3)	−14.1 (6.6)	−5.3 (22.5)	−2.0 (28.4)	4.7 (40.5)	12.3 (54.1)	18.1 (64.6)	15.8 (60.4)	8.8 (47.8)	0.7 (33.3)	−6.8 (19.8)	−18.1 (−0.6)	−18.1 (−0.6)
Average precipitation mm (inches)	30.6 (1.20)	38.1 (1.50)	60.2 (2.37)	46.9 (1.85)	63.2 (2.49)	123.4 (4.86)	227.7 (8.96)	147.7 (5.81)	78.3 (3.08)	49.4 (1.94)	45.6 (1.80)	22.9 (0.90)	934 (36.76)
Average precipitation days (≥ 0.1 mm)	6.8	8.2	8.7	8.1	9.2	9.3	11.5	11.6	8.1	7.2	7.6	5.9	102.2
Average snowy days	4.6	2.7	1.3	0	0	0	0	0	0	0	0.6	1.6	10.8
Average relative humidity (%)	75	75	74	66	67	67	78	80	74	67	75	74	73
Mean monthly sunshine hours	125.3	127.4	163.6	194.2	201.3	179.8	206.2	194.8	165.0	164.6	148.4	136.5	2,007.1
Percentage possible sunshine	39	41	44	50	47	42	48	48	45	47	48	44	45
Source: China Meteorological Administration

== Economy ==
Shou County is crisscrossed with rivers, and as a result it is a very productive agricultural region. Main products of this area include rice, wheat and cotton. Currently Shou County is a focal point of a national project to increase production of agricultural goods. Zhengyang Pass, located on the Wai River, is a major point of transportation and goods distribution in Anhui.
