= Huan Chong =

Chinese general and governor

Huan Chong Duke Xuanmu of Fengcheng
- 桓冲

Personal details
- Born: 328
- Died: 4 April 384 (aged 55–56)
- Relatives: Huan Wen (brother); Huan Huo (brother); Huan Xuan (nephew); Huan Shiqian (nephew)

Huan Chong (桓冲; courtesy name Youzi (幼子); 328 – 4 April 384), formally Duke Xuanmu of Fengcheng (豐城宣穆公), was an Eastern Jin governor and general and the youngest brother of Huan Wen. Contrary to the ambitious Huan Wen, who at times considered seizing the throne, Huan Chong was known to be dedicated to the preservation of the imperial government. After Huan Wen's son Huan Xuan temporarily seized the throne as the emperor of Chu in 403, he posthumously honored Huan Chong as the Prince of Xuancheng.

== Early career under Huan Wen ==
Huan Chong, one of Huan Wen's younger brothers (Note: The other ones were Huan Yun (桓雲), Huan Huo, and Huan Mi (桓秘).), was considered the most knowledgeable, and Huan Wen entrusted him with great responsibilities. By the time he accompanied Huan Wen in his campaign against Yao Xiang (姚襄) in 356, he had become a governor of two commanderies and the military commander of seven. While on a campaign, he defeated and captured the rebel general Zhou Cheng (周成), and was subsequently made the Duke of Fengcheng and the governor of Jiang Province (江州, modern Jiangxi and Fujian).

== The crisis of Huan Wen's succession ==
By the time Huan Wen grew gravely ill in 373, Huan Wen was effectively in direct control of the western two thirds of the empire. As Huan Wen hesitated at seizing the throne and ultimately chose not to do so, he entrusted his command to Huan Chong, rather than his heir apparent Huan Xi (桓熙), because he considered Huan Xi lacking in the talent for military command. However, Huan Xi's younger brother Huan Ji (桓濟), along with Huan Mi, conspired to kill Huan Chong and take over. After Huan Wen died, Huan Chong acted first and arrested Huan Xi and Huan Ji. He then exiled Huan Mi and put Huan Xi and Huan Ji under house arrest. He instead reported to the imperial government that Huan Xuan, Huan Wen's youngest son, was designed by Huan Wen as heir, and the imperial government agreed to let the four-year-old Huan Xuan assume Huan Wen's title of Duke of Nan Commandery.

There had been anticipation that there might be a confrontation between Huan Chong and the prime minister Xie An following Huan Wen's death. Xie avoided a direct confrontation by dividing Huan Wen's domain into three parts and putting them under the commands of Huan Chong, Huan Huo, and Huan Huo's son Huan Shixiu (桓石秀), respectively. Huan Chong was allocated Yang (揚州, modern Zhejiang, southern Jiangsu, and southern Anhui) and Yu (豫州, modern central Anhui) Provinces. Some of his advisors suggested that he kill some of the imperial officials and take over the imperial government, but he refused, and indeed returned the power to authorize executions (which Huan Wen had exercised) back to the imperial government.

== Later life, positions and death ==
In 375, in further sign that he was showing submission to the imperial government, Huan Chong turned down the governorship of Yang Province (which included the capital Jiankang), instead becoming the governor of Xu Province (徐州, modern central and northern Jiangsu). Later, after Huan Huo's death in 377, Xie trusted Huan Chong sufficiently to give him the governorship of the important Jing Province (荊州, modern Hunan and central and southern Hubei), as well as the military command over the western half of the empire—nearly the domain that Huan Wen had controlled earlier.

In 378, after a major attack by Former Qin led to the losses of the important cities of Xiangyang (襄陽, in modern Xiangfan, Hubei) and Weixing (魏興; southeast of present-day Suqian, Jiangsu), both of which were in his command zone and which he had failed to relieve, Huan Chong offered to resign, but his resignation was not accepted.

In 383, when Former Qin launched another major attack, this time seeking to capture Jiankang and destroy Jin, Huan Chong was concerned about the capital's defenses and therefore sent several thousand elite soldiers to Xie to shore up Jiankang's defenses, which Xie declined, stating that the capital was already well-guarded (Note: In reality, the capital was poorly guarded.). Upon receiving the returning soldiers, Huan Chong lamented that while Xie was an able prime minister, he lacked military talent, making the exclamation, "I am finally going to have to wear barbarian clothes!" (Note: Huan felt that that Jin would soon fall to Former Qin, which he considered a barbaric regime.) After Former Qin forces were repelled at the Battle of Fei River, however, Huan Chong became embarrassed— so much so that he grew ill. He died in April 384. Contrary to the customs for high level officials at the time, Huan Chong did not submit a petition to the emperor in his illness, asking for his family members to be given posts, but only wrote to Xie, lamenting that Huan Wen's youngest sons were still young and that he had thus failed in raising them properly, as Huan Wen asked him to. He was greatly praised at the time for this self-deprecation.

== Bibliography ==
- Fang Xuanling, ed. (648). Book of Jin (Jin Shu).
- Sima Guang (1084). Zizhi Tongjian.
