= Book of Jin =

Chinese historical text (compiled in 648)

- Author: Fang Xuanling et al
- Original title: 晉書
- Language: Classical Chinese
- Subject: Ancient Chinese history (Jin dynasty)
- Publication date: 648
- Publication place: China

Book of Jin
- Traditional Chinese: 晉書
- Simplified Chinese: 晋书
Transcriptions
Standard Mandarin
- Hanyu Pinyin: Jìn Shū
Southern Min
- Hokkien POJ: Chìn-su

The Book of Jin is one of the Twenty-Four Histories and covers the history of the Jin dynasty from 266 to 420. It was compiled in 648 by a number of officials commissioned by the imperial court of the Tang dynasty, with chancellor Fang Xuanling as the lead editor, drawing mostly from official documents left from earlier archives. A few essays in volumes 1, 3, 54 and 80 were composed by the Tang dynasty's Emperor Taizong himself. However, the contents of the Book of Jin included not only the history of the Jin dynasty, but also that of the Sixteen Kingdoms period, which was contemporaneous with the Eastern Jin dynasty.

== Compilation ==
Over 20 histories of the Jin had been written during the Jin era itself and the subsequent Northern and Southern dynasties, of which 18 were still extant at the beginning of the Tang dynasty. Yet Emperor Taizong deemed them all to be deficient and ordered the compilation of a new standard history for the period, as part of a wider six-history project to fill in the gaps between the Records of the Three Kingdoms, the Book of Song, the Book of Qi, the Book of Wei and the Emperor's own time. As part of this ambition, its treatises cover not only the Jin but also the preceding Three Kingdoms, making up for the lack of such a section in the Records of the Three Kingdoms.

The book was hastily compiled between 646 CE and 648, by a committee of 21 people led by editor-in-chief Fang Xuanling. As some chapters were written by Emperor Taizong of Tang, the work is sometimes given the honorific "imperially authored".

The Book of Jin had the longest gestation period of any official history, not seeing the light of day until 229 years after the end of the dynasty it describes. As such, it is considered a secondary source.

== Contents ==
=== Annals (紀) ===
#	Title	Translation	Notes
Volume 1	帝紀第1 宣帝	Emperor Xuan	Sima Yi (Western Jin)
Volume 2	帝紀第2 景帝 文帝	Emperor Jing; Emperor Wen	Sima Shi, Sima Zhao
Volume 3	帝紀第3 武帝	Emperor Wu	Sima Yan
Volume 4	帝紀第4 惠帝	Emperor Hui	Sima Zhong
Volume 5	帝紀第5 懷帝 愍帝	Emperor Huai; Emperor Min	Sima Chi, Sima Ye
Volume 6	帝紀第6 元帝 明帝	Emperor Yuan; Emperor Ming	Sima Rui, Sima Shao (Eastern Jin)
Volume 7	帝紀第7 成帝 康帝	Emperor Cheng; Emperor Kang	Sima Yan, Sima Yue
Volume 8	帝紀第8 穆帝 哀帝 海西公	Emperor Mu; Emperor Ai; Duke of Haixi	Sima Dan, Sima Pi, Sima Yi
Volume 9	帝紀第9 簡文帝 孝武帝	Emperor Jianwen; Emperor Xiaowu	Sima Yu, Sima Yao
Volume 10	帝紀第10 安帝 恭帝	Emperor An; Emperor Gong	Sima Dezong, Sima Dewen

=== Treatises (志) ===
#	Title	Translation	Notes
Volume 11	志第1 天文上	Astronomy Part One	
Volume 12	志第2 天文中	Astronomy Part Two	
Volume 13	志第3 天文下	Astronomy Part Three	
Volume 14	志第4 地理上	Geography Part One	
Volume 15	志第5 地理下	Geography Part Two	
Volume 16	志第6 律歷上	Rhythm and the Calendar Part One	
Volume 17	志第7 律歷中	Rhythm and the Calendar Part Two	
Volume 18	志第8 律歷下	Rhythm and the Calendar Part Three	
Volume 19	志第9 禮上	Rites Part One	
Volume 20	志第10 禮中	Rites Part Two	
Volume 21	志第11 禮下	Rites Part Three	
Volume 22	志第12 樂上	Music Part One	
Volume 23	志第13 樂下	Music Part Two	
Volume 24	志第14 職官	Government Service	
Volume 25	志第15 輿服	Travel and Dress	
Volume 26	志第16 食貨	Food and Commodities	
Volume 27	志第17 五行上	Five Elements Part One	
Volume 28	志第18 五行中	Five Elements Part Two	
Volume 29	志第19 五行下	Five Elements Part Three	
Volume 30	志第20 刑法	Punishment and Law	

=== Biographies (列傳) ===
#	Title	Translation	Notes
Volume 31	列傳第1 后妃上	Empresses and Consorts Part One	
Volume 32	列傳第2 后妃下	Empresses and Consorts Part Two	
Volume 33	列傳第3 王祥 鄭沖 何曾 石苞	Wang Xiang; Zheng Chong; He Zeng; Shi Bao	
Volume 34	列傳第4 羊祜 杜預	Yang Hu; Du Yu	
Volume 35	列傳第5 陳騫 裴秀	Chen Qian; Pei Xiu	
Volume 36	列傳第6 衛瓘 張華	Wei Guan; Zhang Hua	
Volume 37	列傳第7 宗室	Imperial Clan	Sima Fu, Sima Quan, Sima Tai, Sima Sui, Sima Sui, Sima Xun, Sima Mu, Sima Ling, and their sons
Volume 38	列傳第8 宣5王 文6王	Five Princes of Xuan; Six Princes of Wen	Sima Gan, Sima Zhou, Sima Jing, Sima Jun, Sima Rong (sons of Sima Yi); Sima You, Sima Zhao, Sima Dingguo, Sima Guangde, Sima Jian, Sima Yanzuo (sons of Sima Zhao)
Volume 39	列傳第9 王沈 荀顗 荀勖 馮紞	Wang Chen; Xun Yi; Xun Xu; Feng Dan	
Volume 40	列傳第10 賈充 郭彰 楊駿	Jia Chong; Guo Zhang; Yang Jun	
Volume 41	列傳第11 魏舒 李憙 劉寔 高光	Wei Shu; Li Xi; Liu Shi; Gao Guang	
Volume 42	列傳第12 王渾 王濬 唐彬	Wang Hun; Wang Jun; Tang Bin	
Volume 43	列傳第13 山濤 王戎 郭舒 樂廣	Shan Tao; Wang Rong; Guo Shu; Yue Guang	
Volume 44	列傳第14 鄭袤 李胤 盧欽 華表 石鑒 溫羨	Zheng Mao; Li Yin; Lu Qin; Hua Biao; Shi Jian; Wen Xian	
Volume 45	列傳第15 劉毅 程衛 和嶠 武陔 任愷 崔洪 郭奕 侯史光 何攀	Liu Yi; Cheng Wei; He Jiao; Wu Gai; Ren Kai; Cui Hong; Guo Yi; Hou Shiguang; He Pan	
Volume 46	列傳第16 劉頌 李重	Liu Song; Li Zhong	
Volume 47	列傳第17 傅玄	Fu Xuan	
Volume 48	列傳第18 向雄 段灼 閻纘	Xiang Xiong; Duan Zhuo; Yan Zuan	
Volume 49	列傳第19 阮籍 嵇康 向秀 劉伶 謝鯤 胡毋輔之 畢卓 王尼 羊曼 光逸	Ruan Ji; Ji Kang; Xiang Xiu; Liu Ling; Xie Kun; Huwu Fuzhi; Bi Zhuo; Wang Ni; Yang Man; Guang Yi	
Volume 50	列傳第20 曹志 庾峻 郭象 庾純 秦秀	Cao Zhi; Yu Jun; Guo Xiang; Yu Chun; Qin Xiu	
Volume 51	列傳第21 皇甫謐 摯虞 束皙 王接	Huangfu Mi; Zhi Yu; Shu Xi; Wang Jie	
Volume 52	列傳第22 郤詵 阮種 華譚 袁甫	Xi Shen; Ruan Zhong; Hua Tan; Yuan Fu	
Volume 53	列傳第23 愍懷太子	Crown Prince Minhuai	
Volume 54	列傳第24 陸機 陸雲	Lu Ji; Lu Yun	
Volume 55	列傳第25 夏侯湛 潘岳 張載	Xiahou Zhan; Pan Yue; Zhang Zai	
Volume 56	列傳第26 江統 孫楚	Jiang Tong; Sun Chu	
Volume 57	列傳第27 羅憲 滕修 馬隆 胡奮 陶璜 吾彥 張光 趙誘	Luo Xian; Teng Xiu; Ma Long; Hu Fen; Tao Huang; Wu Yan; Zhang Guang; Zhao You	
Volume 58	列傳第28 周處 周訪	Zhou Chu; Zhou Fang	
Volume 59	列傳第29 汝南文成王亮 楚隱王瑋 趙王倫 齊王冏 長沙王乂 成都王穎 河間王顒 東海孝獻王越	Liang, Prince Wencheng of Ru'nan; Wei, Prince Yin of Chu; Lun, Prince of Zhao; Jiong, Prince of Qi; Ai, Prince of Changsha; Ying, Prince of Chengdu; Yong, Prince of Hejian; Yue, Prince Xiaoxian of Donghai	
Volume 60	列傳第30 解系 孫旂 孟觀 牽秀 繆播 皇甫重 張輔 李含 張方 閻鼎 索靖 賈疋	Xie Xi; Sun Qi; Meng Guan; Qian Xiu; Miao Bo; Huangfu Zhong; Zhang Fu; Li Han; Zhang Fang; Yan Ding; Suo Jing; Jia Ya	
Volume 61	列傳第31 周浚 成公簡 苟晞 華軼 劉喬	Zhou Jun; Cheng Gongjian; Gou Xi; Hua Yi; Liu Qiao	
Volume 62	列傳第32 劉琨 祖逖	Liu Kun; Zu Ti	
Volume 63	列傳第33 邵續 李矩 段匹磾 魏浚 郭默	Shao Xu; Li Ju; Duan Pidi; Wei Jun; Guo Mo	
Volume 64	列傳第34 武13王 元4王 簡文3子	Thirteen Princes of Wu; Four Princes of Yuan; Three Sons of Jianwen	
Volume 65	列傳第35 王導	Wang Dao	
Volume 66	列傳第36 劉弘 陶侃	Liu Hong; Tao Kan	
Volume 67	列傳第37 溫嶠 郗鑒	Wen Jiao; Xi Jian	
Volume 68	列傳第38 顧榮 紀瞻 賀循 楊方 薛兼	Gu Rong; Ji Zhan; He Xun; Yang Fang; Xue Jian	
Volume 69	列傳第39 劉隗 刁協 戴若思 周顗	Liu Wei; Diao Xie; Dai Ruosi; Zhou Yi	
Volume 70	列傳第40 應詹 甘卓 鄧騫 卞壼	Ying Zhan; Gan Zhuo; Deng Qian; Bian Kun	
Volume 71	列傳第41 孫惠 熊遠 王鑒 陳頵 高崧	Sun Hui; Xiong Yuan; Wang Jian; Chen Yun; Gao Song	
Volume 72	列傳第42 郭璞 葛洪	Guo Pu; Ge Hong	
Volume 73	列傳第43 庾亮	Yu Liang	
Volume 74	列傳第44 桓彝	Huan Yi	
Volume 75	列傳第45 王湛 荀崧 范汪 劉惔	Wang Zhan; Xun Song; Fan Wang; Liu Tan	
Volume 76	列傳第46 王舒 王廙 虞潭 顧眾 張闓	Wang Shu; Wang Yi; Yu Tan; Gu Zhong; Zhang Kai	
Volume 77	列傳第47 陸曄 何充 褚翜 蔡謨 諸葛恢 殷浩	Lu Ye; He Chong; Chu Se; Cai Mo; Zhuge Hui; Yin Hao	
Volume 78	列傳第48 孔愉 丁潭 張茂 陶回	Kong Yu; Ding Tan; Zhang Mao; Tao Hui	
Volume 79	列傳第49 謝尚 謝安	Xie Shang; Xie An	
Volume 80	列傳第50 王羲之	Wang Xizhi	
Volume 81	列傳第51 王遜 蔡豹 羊鑒 劉胤 桓宣 硃伺 毛寶 劉遐 鄧岳 朱序	Wang Xun; Cai Bao; Yang Jian; Liu Yin; Huan Xuan; Zhu Si; Mao Bao; Liu Xia; Deng Yue; Zhu Xu	
Volume 82	列傳第52 陳壽 王長文 虞溥 司馬彪 王隱 虞預 孫盛 干寶 鄧粲 謝沈 習鑿齒 徐廣	Chen Shou; Wang Changwen; Yu Pu; Sima Biao; Wang Yin; Yu Yu; Sun Sheng; Gan Bao; Deng Can; Xie Chen; Xi Zuochi; Xu Guang	
Volume 83	列傳第53 顧和 袁瑰 江逌 車胤 殷顗 王雅	Gu He; Yuan Mei; Jiang You; Che Yin; Yin Yi; Wang Ya	
Volume 84	列傳第54 王恭 庾楷 劉牢之 殷仲堪 楊佺期	Wang Gong; Yu Kai; Liu Laozhi; Yin Zhongkan; Yang Quanqi	
Volume 85	列傳第55 劉毅 諸葛長民 何無忌 檀憑之 魏詠之	Liu Yi; Zhuge Changmin; He Wuji; Tan Pingzhi; Wei Yongzhi	
Volume 86	列傳第56 張軌	Zhang Gui	
Volume 87	列傳第57 涼武昭王李玄盛	Li Xuansheng, Prince Wuzhao of Liang	
Volume 88	列傳第58 孝友	Filial Piety	
Volume 89	列傳第59 忠義	Loyalty and Righteousness	
Volume 90	列傳第60 良吏	Good Officials	
Volume 91	列傳第61 儒林	Confucian Scholars	
Volume 92	列傳第62 文苑	Writers	
Volume 93	列傳第63 外戚	Imperial Affines	
Volume 94	列傳第64 隱逸	Hermits and Recluses	
Volume 95	列傳第65 藝術	Arts	
Volume 96	列傳第66 列女	Exemplary Women	
Volume 97	列傳第67 4夷	Four Barbarian Tribes	
Volume 98	列傳第68 王敦 桓溫	Wang Dun; Huan Wen	
Volume 99	列傳第69 桓玄 卞范之 殷仲文	Huan Xuan; Bian Fanzhi; Yin Zhongwen	
Volume 100	列傳第70 王彌 張昌 陳敏 王如 杜曾 杜弢 王機 祖約 蘇峻 孫恩 盧循 譙縱	Wang Mi; Zhang Chang; Chen Min; Wang Ru; Du Zeng; Du Tao; Wang Ji; Zu Yue; Su Jun; Sun En; Lu Xun; Qiao Zong	

=== Records (載記) ===
#	Title	Translation	Notes
Volume 101	載記第1 劉元海 劉宣	Liu Yuanhai; Liu Xuan	
Volume 102	載記第2 劉聰 劉粲 陳元達	Liu Cong; Liu Can; Chen Yuanda	
Volume 103	載記第3 劉曜	Liu Yao	
Volume 104	載記第4 石勒上	Shi Le Part One	
Volume 105	載記第5 石勒下 石弘 張賓	Shi Le Part Two; Shi Hong; Zhang Bin	
Volume 106	載記第6 石季龍上	Shi Jilong Part One	
Volume 107	載記第7 石季龍下 石世 石遵 石鑒 冉閔	Shi Jilong Part Two; Shi Shi; Shi Zun; Shi Jian; Ran Min	
Volume 108	載記第8 慕容廆 裴嶷 高瞻	Murong Hui; Pei Yi; Gao Zhan	
Volume 109	載記第9 慕容皝 慕容翰 陽裕	Murong Huang; Murong Han; Yang Yu	
Volume 110	載記第10 慕容儁 韓恆 李產	Murong Jun; Han Heng; Li Chan	
Volume 111	載記第11 慕容暐 慕容恪 陽騖 皇甫真	Murong Wei; Murong Ke; Yang Wu; Huangfu Zhen	
Volume 112	載記第12 苻洪 苻健 苻生 苻雄 王墮	Fu Hong; Fu Jian; Fu Sheng; Fu Xiong; Wang Duo	
Volume 113	載記第13 苻堅上	Fu Jian Part One	
Volume 114	載記第14 苻堅下 王猛 苻融 苻朗	Fu Jian Part Two; Wang Meng; Fu Rong; Fu Lang	
Volume 115	載記第15 苻丕 苻登 索泮 徐嵩	Fu Pi; Fu Deng; Suo Pan; Xu Song	
Volume 116	載記第16 姚弋仲 姚襄 姚萇	Yao Yizhong; Yao Xiang; Yao Chang	
Volume 117	載記第17 姚興上	Yao Xing Part One	
Volume 118	載記第18 姚興下 尹緯	Yao Xing Part Two; Yin Wei	
Volume 119	載記第19 姚泓	Yao Hong	
Volume 120	載記第20 李特 李流 李庠	Li Te; Li Liu; Li Xiang	
Volume 121	載記第21 李雄 李班 李期 李壽 李勢	Li Xiong; Li Ban; Li Qi; Li Shou; Li Shi	
Volume 122	載記第22 呂光 呂纂 呂隆	Lü Guang; Lü Zuan; Lü Long	
Volume 123	載記第23 慕容垂	Murong Chui	
Volume 124	載記第24 慕容寶 慕容盛 慕容熙 慕容雲	Murong Bao; Murong Sheng; Murong Xi; Murong Yun	
Volume 125	載記第25 乞伏國仁 乞伏乾歸 乞伏熾磐 馮跋	Qifu Guoren; Qifu Gangui; Qifu Chipan; Feng Ba	
Volume 126	載記第26 禿髮烏孤 禿髮利鹿孤 禿髮傉檀	Tufa Wugu; Tufa Lilugu; Tufa Rutan	
Volume 127	載記第27 慕容德	Murong De	
Volume 128	載記第28 慕容超 慕容鍾 封孚	Murong Chao; Murong Zhong; Feng Fu	
Volume 129	載記第29 沮渠蒙遜	Juqu Mengxun	
Volume 130	載記第30 赫連勃勃	Helian Bobo	

== Legacy ==
The book has been criticized for being more reflective of the court politics in the Tang dynasty that compiled it, rather than the realities of the Jin dynasty itself.

Despite Fang's team having at their disposal not only the pre-existing Jin histories, but also a large body of actual Jin primary sources, it appears that the book was primarily based on Zang Rongxu's (臧荣绪) identically-titled Jinshu from the Southern Qi, and further incorporates material from fictionalized novels. The Tang historian Liu Zhiji (661–721) accused the editors of generally selecting the sources that had the most vivid and compelling language, rather than the ones that were the most historically reliable.

The collaborative nature of the project coupled with the rushed production time unsurprisingly leaves the book with a number of internal contradictions and editorial errors; such as misspelled personal and place names, draft-like and unpolished language, and "cross-references" to non-existent chapters that were presumably planned but never finished in time for publication.

In spite of these shortcomings, the Book of Jin is recognized as the most important primary source for the Jin dynasty and Sixteen Kingdoms, because the pre-existing histories and other sources it was compiled from have all been lost – save for a few stray quotations in other works.

== Translations ==
No complete translations are known at this time. The astronomical chapters (11, 12 & 13) were translated by Ho Peng Yoke. Choo translates the biography of Huan Wen in volume 98 and the biography of Sun Chuo in volume 56. Knapp translates biographies of Liu Yin in volume 88 and Huangfu Mi in volume 51.

== See also ==
- Twenty-Four Histories
- Eighteen History Books of Jin
