= Shi Bing =

Jin dynasty rebel (died 304)

Shi Bing (石冰) (died c.May 304 ) was a rebel of the Jin dynasty (266–420). He followed the Man official, Zhang Chang when he rebelled in 303 and captured Yang province. He held on to the province after the main force under Zhang Chang were routed, but in 304, he was defeated by Jin forces led by Chen Min and the Jiangnan gentry before being assassinated.

== Life ==
Shi Bing was a follower of the Man official, Zhang Chang when he rebelled in 303 at Jiangxia Commandery in Jing province. During the rebellion, Zhang Chang sent Shi Bing with an army to invade Jiang and Yang provinces in the east. Shi Bing defeated the Inspector of Yang, Chen Hui (陳徽) and captured the commanderies in the province. Zhang Chang then ordered Shi Bing to appoint his own administrators and magistrates at various places. Shi Bing then attacked and conquered Jiang province as the local populace were forced into submission out of fear of the rebels' strength. Afterwards, he sent his generals Chen Zhen (陳貞), Chen Lan (陳蘭) and Zhang Fu (張甫) to attack Wuling, Lingling (零陵郡; around present-day Yongzhou, Hunan), Yuzhang (豫章郡; around present-day Nanchang, Jiangxi), Wuchang, and Changsha, and these commanderies all fell to the rebels. A man from Linhuai, Feng Yun (封雲), also rebelled and invaded Xu province in support of Shi Bing.

Despite Zhang Chang's forces spreading across five provinces, his rebellion quickly lost support as the governors and administrators he appointed all continued plundering their counties and commanderies. Soon, Zhang Chang was defeated and forced into hiding by Jin forces led by Tao Kan and others, but Shi Bing maintained his power in Yang province.

In 304, living under Shi Bing's occupation, the Jin officials, Zhou Qi and Wang Ju (王矩), raised their armies against him. They proclaimed the Prefect of Wuxing, Gu Mi (顧秘; son of Gu Ti) to lead them as Chief Controller of Nine Commanderies in Yang province, and were joined by members of the Jiangnan gentry clans such as He Xun, Hua Tan, Gan Zhuo and Ge Hong. Shi Bing sent his subordinate, Qiang Du (羌毒), to attack them, but he was routed. Shi Bing decided to move from Linhuai to launch a surprise attack on Shochun, which was occupied by the Jin general, Liu Zhun (劉準). Liu Zhun was frightened when he heard that Shi Bing was coming, but the Logistical Director of Guangling, Chen Min offered himself to defeat the rebels.

Shi Bing fought dozens of battles against Chen Min, but despite outnumbering him ten to one, he was defeated in each bout. Both Zhou Qi and Chen Min's forces converged onto Shi Bing at the city of Jianye. After months of siege, Shi Bing fled north to join Feng Yun in Xu province. However, when Chen Min attacked them, a subordinate of Feng Yun, Zhang Tong (張統) assassinated the two men and surrendered to Jin, thus bringing Zhang Chang's rebellion to an end.
