= Gan Zhuo =

Jin dynasty official (died 322)

- 甘卓
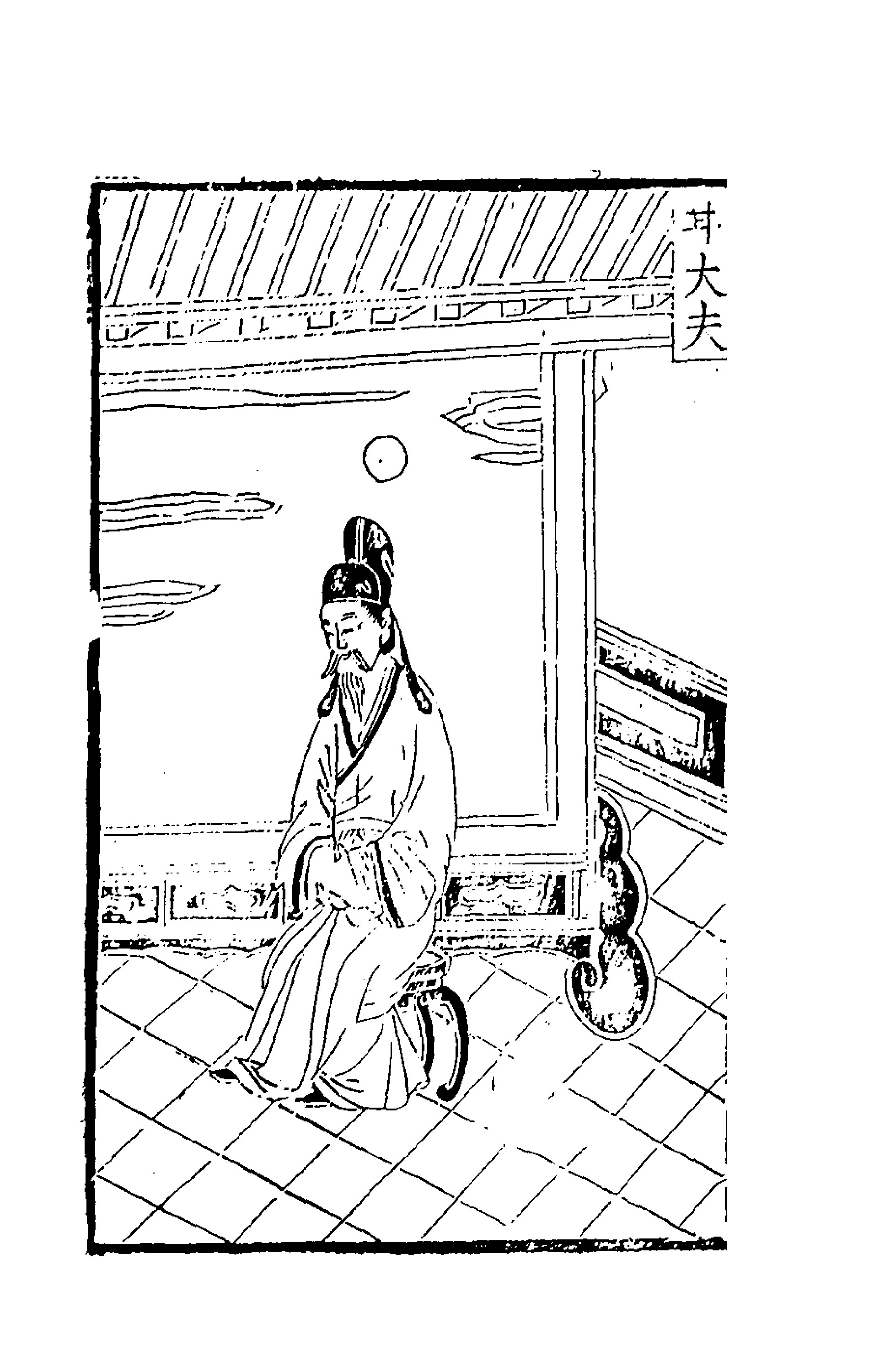

Inspector of Liangzhou (梁州刺史)
- In office 320 – 322
- Monarch: Emperor Yuan of Jin

Personal details
- Born: Unknown Xuancheng, Anhui
- Died: 23 June 322 Xiangyang, Hubei
- Relations: Gan Ning (great-grandfather)
- Children: Lady Gan; Gan Bo; Three unnamed sons
- Parent: Gan Chang (father)
- Courtesy name: Jisi (季思)
- Peerage: Marquis of Yuhu (于湖侯)
- Posthumous name: Jing (敬)

Gan Zhuo (died 23 June 322), courtesy name Jisi, was a military general of the Jin dynasty (266–420). The great-grandson of the famed general, Gan Ning, he was involved in the suppression of Shi Bing's rebellion, but later allied himself with Chen Min in his takeover of the Jiangnan region in 305. After the Jiangnan gentry rose up against Chen Min in 307, he defected back to Jin and played a role in defeating the rebellion. Gan Zhuo later became an important retainer of the Prince of Langya and future emperor Yuan of Jin, Sima Rui, participating in campaigns against Zhou Fu, Hua Yi and Du Tao to consolidate his position in the Jiangnan. In 322, Gan Zhuo raised an army against the Jin commander, Wang Dun as he attacked Emperor Yuan at Jiankang, but his indecisiveness and declining mental state stopped him from preventing the imperial forces' defeat, and he was soon assassinated by his subordinate.

== Early life and career ==
Gan Zhuo was a native of Danyang Commandery (丹陽郡; in present-day Xuancheng, Anhui), although his ancestral home was in Linjiang County, Ba Commandery (巴郡; present-day Chongqing). He was the great-grandson of Gan Ning, a general during the end of the Han dynasty who served the founder of Eastern Wu, Sun Quan, and also the son of Gan Chang (甘昌), who was the grand tutor to the crown prince under Wu. After Wu fell to the Western Jin dynasty in May 280, Gan Zhuo decided to live in seclusion back at his home. He was later summoned to serve as chief clerk and officer of merit in Danyang, after which he was nominated as a xiaolian. He was then nominated as a xiucai in Yang province, and soon became a Regular Attendant for the Prince of Wu.

In 303, the Man official, Zhang Chang began a wide-scale rebellion in southern China, and his general, Shi Bing was able to capture Yang province. The local gentry, led by Zhou Qi and Wang Ju (王矩), planned to overthrow Shi Bing and soon began openly raising their armies. Gan Zhuo was one of the many who joined the pro-Jin forces, and after Shi Bing was defeated in 304, he was enfeoffed as the Marquis of Duting. Later on, the Prince of Donghai, Sima Yue summoned Gan Zhuo to have him serve as an Army Advisor and appointed him as the Prefect of Lihu (離狐; southeast of present-day Dongming, Shandong). However, in 305, seeing the chaos in northern China, he abandoned his post and fled back to the Jiangnan.

== Chen Min's Rebellion ==
Along the way, Gan Zhuo met the chancellor of Guangling, Chen Min at Liyang. With the imperial court distracted by civil war, Chen Min had intention of declaring independence in the Jiangnan, and Gan Zhuo agreed with his plans. He appointed Chen Min the Inspector of Yang province, pretending to be an envoy from the crown prince, Sima Chi, and married his daughter to Chen Min's son to seal their alliance. Chen Min then declared himself the Duke of Chu before invading the Jiangnan with his army, easily capturing the region.

Chen Min ruled the Jiangnan from 305 to 307, during which he failed to win the support of the gentry clans. Gu Rong, Zhou Qi and others conspired to depose him and return to Jin, so they contacted the Jin general, Liu Zhun (劉準) to send an army south of the Yangzi River. Chen Min sent his brother, Chen Chang (陳昶) to intercept the Jin forces, but after he was killed by a traitor, Qian Guang (錢廣), he sent Gan Zhuo to defend the Zhuque Bridge (朱雀橋; south of present-day Nanjing). Gu Rong, who Chen Min was unaware was working against him, went out to meet Gan Zhuo with Zhou Qi to persuade him into defecting. Gan Zhuo had always respected Gu Rong, and because Chen Chang was dead, he decided to join the conspirators. He pretended to be ill unless his daughter could be delivered to him, and once he received her, he lowered the bridge, gathered the boats on the southern bank and led the Jin forces to defeat Chen Min.

== Service under Sima Rui ==
After Chen Min's defeat in 307, the Prince of Langya, Sima Rui was assigned to guard the Jiangnan. Gan Zhuo was recommended to him by Gu Rong, so he was appointed as Vanguard Commander, General Who Spreads Might and Interior Minister of Liyang. In 311, Gan Zhuo and others defeated the Chief Controller of Yang province, Zhou Fu at Shouchun after he rebelled. Later that year, he joined in the campaign against the Inspector of Jiang province, Hua Yi, defeating and beheading him. Gan Zhuo also participated in the war against the rebel, Du Tao in the Central Yangzi region between 311 and 315. For his merits in putting down these rebellions, he was first appointed the administrator of Yuzhang and enfeoffed as Marquis of Nanxiang. He was then promoted to Inspector of Xiang province (湘州, modern central Hunan) and elevated to Marquis of Yuhu.

In 320, three years after Sima Rui, posthumously known as Emperor Yuan of Jin, founded the Eastern Jin dynasty at Jiankang, Gan Zhuo was promoted to General Who Stabilizes the South and Inspector of Liang province. He was also appointed as chief controller of the Mianbei and assigned to Xiangyang to replace Zhou Fang, who had recently died. His rule was described as simple and compassionate, taking great care in controlling the local tribes. He abolished both taxes on trade and dual pricing in the markets, and also donated all taxes collected from fish ponds in his territory to the poor, thus earning him high praise from the locals.

== Wang Dun's Rebellion ==
=== Opposing Wang Dun ===
In 322, the general, Wang Dun launched a rebellion and led his forces to attack Jiankang, ostensibly to remove the corrupt officials, Diao Xie and Liu Huai, who Emperor Yuan favoured. Wang Dun sent messengers to Gan Zhuo asking him to join, which Gan Zhuo initially agreed. However, in the course of the rebellion, Gan Zhuo did not appear, and instead sent his official, Sun Shuang (孫雙) to order Wang Dun to stop. Wang Dun was taken by surprise, so he sent Sun Shuang back with an offer to make Gan Zhuo a duke. Gan Zhuo hesitated but still refused to join. Worried that Gan Zhuo was not coming, Wang Dun sent his advisor, Yue Daorong (樂道融) to persuade him.

However, Daorong was secretly against Wang Dun's rebellion, so when he met Gan Zhuo, he advised him to oppose Wang Dun instead. Gan Zhuo was convinced, so he ordered Liu Chun (柳純), Xiahou Cheng (夏侯承; great-grandson of Xiahou Wei), Tan Gai (譚該) and others to send out proclamations denouncing Wang Dun's crimes and calling for a campaign against him. He also contacted Sima Cheng and the Inspector of Guang province (廣州, modern Guangdong), Tao Kan, to attack Wang Dun at his base in Wuchang (武昌; present-day Ezhou, Hubei). Many people in Wuchang were terrified by Gan Zhuo's declaration and fled, while the imperial court commended him and rejoiced.

=== Standstill at Zhukou ===
Yet, despite openly expressing his intentions, Gan Zhuo remained indecisive and suspicious, which records attribute to his old age. Halfway through his march to Wuchang, he decided to stop at Zhukou (豬口; southeast of present-day Jingshan, Hubei) and planned to rescue Sima Cheng, who was besieged by Wang Dun's general, Wei Yi (魏乂) at Changsha. Cheng told Gan Zhuo to leave him and take Wuchang first, as it would naturally lift the siege of Changsha, but Gan Zhuo did not move. Meanwhile, Wang Dun sent Gan Zhuo's nephew, Gan Ang (甘卬) to persuade him into making peace. Gan Zhuo remained at Zhukou for many days, allowing Wang Dun to break into Jiankang and take over the government.

Wang Dun had the officials, Zhou Yi and Dai Yuan killed, and he sent messengers with the Zouyu Banners (騶虞幡) to Gan Zhuo's army to get them to surrender. When Gan Zhuo heard that Zhou Yi and Dai Yuan were killed, he told Gan Ang that he was worried that if he attacked Wuchang, Wang Dun would harm Emperor Yuan and the imperial family, so he decided to return to Xiangyang. His Commandant, Qin Kang (秦康) and Yue Daorong urged him to persist, advising him to take Pengze to cut off communications between Wang Dun's forces in Wuchang and Jiankang so that their troops will disperse. However, Gan Zhuo refused to listen.

=== Death ===
Gan Zhuo's temperament drastically deteriorated when he returned to Xiangyang, becoming easily irritated and making abnormal body movements. His chief clerk, He Wuji (何無忌), advised him to be more vigilant against Wang Dun, but he angrily refused. He ordered his soldiers to disarm and began a large-scale land cultivation, leaving no soldiers for his defense. His Officer of Merit, Rong Jian (榮建) tried to dissuade him but was also ignored. After learning that Gan Zhuo had failed to take any precautions, Wang Dun sent a secret order to the Prefect of Xiangyang, Zhou Lü (周慮) to kill him. Zhou Lü falsely informed Gan Zhuo that there had been many fish in the lakes and advised him to send his soldiers to go fish, which Gan Zhuo agreed. Once he was defenseless, Zhou Lü ordered his men to kill Gan Zhuo in his bedroom and sent his head to Wang Dun. His four sons, including Gan Bo (甘蕃), were also killed.

After Wang Dun's rebellion was put down in 324, Gan Zhuo was posthumously appointed General of Agile Cavalry and given the posthumous name of "Jing" (敬).
