= Qian Hui =

Chinese Jin dynasty official and rebel (died 310)

- 錢璯

Senior General Who Pacifies the West (平西大將軍) (Self-appointed)
- In office 310 – 310

Personal details
- Born: Unknown Huzhou, Zhejiang
- Died: 310 Yixing, Jiangsu

Qian Hui (died April or May 310) was a military general and rebel of the Jin dynasty (266–420).

== Life ==
Qian Hui was a member of the Qian clan of Wuxing Commandery (吳興, roughly modern Huzhou, Zhejiang). He raised an army and participated in the suppression of Chen Min's rebellion in 307, and for his achievements, the Prince of Donghai, Sima Yue, appointed him as the General Who Establishes Might.

In 310, Sima Yue summoned Qian Hui and the Inspector of Yang province, Wang Dun to the capital, Luoyang. At the time, the Jin was at war with the Han-Zhao dynasty in northern China. When Qian Hui reached Guangling Commandery, he learned that the Han general, Liu Cong was attacking Luoyang and stopped out of hesitation. As he delayed, Emperor Huai of Jin urged him to hasten, but Qian Hui instead planned to kill Wang Dun and rebel. However, Wang Dun was able to escape to Jianye, where he informed the Prince of Langya, Sima Rui about the matter.

Qian Hui killed the colonel of logistical affairs, Chen Feng (陳豊) and burnt down his residence. He proclaimed himself as Senior General Who Pacifies the West and Chief Controller of the Eight Provinces. He also installed Sun Chong (孫充), son of the last emperor of the Eastern Wu dynasty, Sun Hao, as the new King of Wu, but later killed him as well. Qian Hui attacked Yangxian County in Wuxing Commandery, prompting Sima Rui to send his generals, Guo Yi (郭逸) and Song Dian (宋典) (Note: Song Dian was likely the same person as Sima Rui's guard who accompanied him as he escaped a curfew imposed by Sima Ying, made his way to Luoyang and then back to his fiefdom of Langya during the War of the Eight Princes.) to attack him.

At first, Guo Yi and Song Dian were unwilling to engage Qian Hui as they had very few soldiers under their command. The Assistant Granary Manager and native of Wuxing, Zhou Qi, volunteered to gather people from his village to join Guo Yi and Song Dian. The Jin forces then attacked Qian Hui and killed him, sending his head to Jianye.
