= Zhou Qi (disambiguation) =

Zhou Qi may refer to:

- Zhou Qi (born 1996), Chinese basketball player
- Zhou Qi (writer) (1814–1861), Qing dynasty writer
- Zhou Qi (biologist) (born 1970), Chinese biologist
- Zhou Qi (Jin dynasty), Jin official and son of Zhou Chu
