= Zhou Qi (Jin dynasty) =

Jin dynasty official (258 - 313)

- 周玘

Administrator of Yixing (義興太守)
- In office 311 – 313
- Monarchs: Emperor Huai of Jin/ Emperor Min of Jin

Personal details
- Born: 258 Yixing, Jiangsu
- Died: 313
- Children: Zhou Xie; Zhou Yi
- Parent: Zhou Chu (father)
- Courtesy name: Xuanpei (宣佩)
- Peerage: Duke of Wucheng (烏程公)
- Posthumous name: Zhonglie (忠烈)

Zhou Qi (258 – c. August 313 (Note: Vol.05 of Jiankang Shilu recorded that Zhou Qi died in the 7th month of the 1st year of the Jian'xing era of Emperor Min's reign; the month corresponds to 8 Aug to 6 Sep 313 in the Julian calendar. The Book of Jin recorded that Dai Yang correctly predicted (in the 6th year of the Yongjia era) that Zhou would die before the 8th month of the following year; the record went on to indicate that Zhou did die in the same month as recorded in Jiankang Shilu. Dai also correctly predicted the demise of Gu Rong, who died about seven months before Zhou.)), courtesy name Xuanpei, was a military general of the Jin dynasty (266–420). The eldest son of the general, Zhou Chu, he was a prominent figure among the Jiangnan gentry clans who led them against the rebels Shi Bing, Chen Min and Qian Hui, which became known as the "Three Pacifications of Jiangnan" (三定江南). His deeds allowed the Prince of Langya and future Emperor Yuan of Jin, Sima Rui to settle in the Jiangnan, but suspicion grew between the two as the prince began favouring the northern emigres families (僑姓士族), who sought refuge due to the upheaval of the Five Barbarians, over the southern indigenous gentry clans (吳姓士族). He plotted to eliminate the northern emigres but failed and soon died in anger.

== Background ==
Zhou Qi was a member of the Zhou clan of Yangxian County in Wuxing Commandery (吳興, roughly modern Huzhou, Zhejiang) as the son of Zhou Chu. His father was a folk hero in their hometown during the Eastern Wu period, known for "eradicating the Three Scourges" (周處除三害), and later died in battle during Qi Wannian's rebellion while serving the Jin dynasty. Zhou Qi was described as possessing his father's strength and perseverance, but lacking his talent in literature. He often kept to himself and was careful in making friends, yet for this reason, he was well-respected among his friends and the scholar-officials in Jiangnan.

After reaching adulthood, Zhou Qi refused to accept offers to serve in a county or commandery office. It was not until when he met a newly-appointed Inspector of Yang province, who showed him proper humility and etiquette, that he accepted a position as an aide-de-camp. Eventually, he was recommended as xiucai and was promoted to a Counsellor.

== Three Pacifications of Jiangnan ==
=== Shi Bing's rebellion ===
In 303, the Man official, Zhang Chang led a major rebellion against Jin in Jing province, spilling over to neighbouring provinces in the south. Although he was defeated and forced into hiding later that year, his follower, Shi Bing was still at large and captured Yang province with his army. Under Shi Bing's occupation, Zhou Qi planned to defeat him, and so he conspired with the former Interior Minister of Nanping, Wang Ju (王矩). They recommended the Prefect of Wuxing, Gu Mi (顧秘; son of Gu Ti) (Note: Gu Mi would eventually succeed Wu Yan as Inspector of Jiaozhou.) to lead their forces as Chief Controller of Nine Commanderies in Yang, and sent calls to rally the local gentry. He Xun, Gan Zhuo, Ge Hong and others all joined forces with Zhou Qi, and he led them to attack Shi Bing's Administrator of Wuxing, Ou Shan (區山), killing him and his chief clerks. When Shi Bing heard that Zhou Qi had raised an army, he sent his general Qiang Du (羌毒) to intercept him, but he was routed.

In early 304, the Jin general, Chen Min was leading an army from Shouchun to support Zhou Qi. Chen Min and Zhou Qi were able to link up and besieged Shi Bing at Jianye. After a month of siege, Shi Bing fled to a fellow rebel leader Feng Yun (封雲) in Xu province, where they were both assassinated by a subordinate of the latter as Chen Min attacked them. With Yang province pacified, Zhou Qi returned to his hometown and disbanded his army, never reporting his achievements and refusing awards from the imperial court.

=== Chen Min's rebellion ===
Meanwhile, Chen Min was rewarded, and in 305, he served as a general under the Prince of Donghai, Sima Yue against the Prince of Hejian, Sima Yong. However, as the princes were preoccupied with their war, Chen Min took the opportunity to occupy the Jiangnan with his forces. He gave out many titles to the local gentry to consolidate his rule, but Zhou Qi was one of the few who refused to serve him, claiming that he was ill.

In 307, two years since Chen Min's takeover, Sima Yue had won his civil war, prompting the Interior Minister of Lujiang, Hua Tan to send out stern letters to the Jiangnan gentry criticizing them for their inaction against Chen Min. Zhou Qi received the letter and felt shame, so he conspired with other Jin loyalists to overthrow Chen Min. They secretly informed the Jin general, Liu Zhun (劉準) in Shouchun regarding their plot and asked him to send his soldiers south of the Yangzi while they acted from within. The conspirators pledged their allegiance by cutting their hair, a taboo in Confucian filial piety, as Liu Zhun ordered Liu Ji (劉機), Heng Yan (衡彥) and others to campaign against Chen Min. Chen Min sent his brother, Chen Chang (陳昶) to repel the Jin army. One of Chen Chang's subordinates, Qian Guang (錢廣) was from the same commandery as Zhou Qi, so Zhou Qi persuaded and instigated him to betray and assassinate Chen Chang. Later, Zhou Qi and his ally, Gu Rong also persuaded Gan Zhuo to defect to Jin. Through the combined effort of the Jin forces, Chen Min was soon defeated and executed.

Zhou Qi's reputation caught the attention of Sima Yue, who wanted to recruit him as a military officer. He was given a promotion to Gentleman of the Masters of Writing and Cavalier Attendant-in-Ordinary, but he turned them both down. Following Chen Min's defeat, the Prince of Langya, Sima Rui was assigned to Jianye, and he assigned Zhou Qi as the Assistant Granary Manager.

=== Qian Hui's rebellion ===
In 310, Sima Yue summoned the general Qian Hui from Wuxing to the capital in Luoyang. At the time, the Jin was at war with the Xiongnu-led Han-Zhao dynasty in the north. Qian Hui marched up to Guangling before hearing that the capital was facing attacks by the Han general, Liu Cong. He was reluctant to go any further, and with the emperor pressuring him with the deadline, he planned to rebel. The Inspector of Yang province, Wang Dun was also summoned to the capital, so Qian Hui wanted to kill him to kick off his rebellion. However, Wang Dun escaped to Jianye, where he informed Sima Rui about the situation.

Qian Hui soon rebelled and invaded Yangxian County. Sima Rui sent Guo Yi (郭逸) and Song Dian (宋典) (Note: Song Dian was likely the same person as Sima Rui's guard who accompanied him as he escaped a curfew imposed by Sima Ying, made his way to Luoyang and then back to his fiefdom of Langya during the War of the Eight Princes.) to attack him, but the two generals initially did not dare to engage him as they had very little troops. Zhou Qi personally gathered people from his hometown to join them in their campaign, killing Qian Hui and sending his head to Jianye. Zhou Qi had pacified Jiangnan for the third time.

== Conflict with Sima Rui and death ==
=== Forming Yixing Commandery ===
Sima Rui appointed Zhou Qi as the General Who Establishes Might and Administrator of Wuxing along with bestowing him the title of Marquis of Wucheng. Wuxing had been suffering from famine and banditry, but Zhou Qi governed with authority and was loved by the peasants. Thus, for a year, there was peace in Wuxing. Sima Rui formed Yixing Commandery out of Zhou Qi's hometown and five other counties and honoured him as the first Administrator of the new commandery.

=== Conspiracy against the northern emigres ===
Zhou Qi and his family had become very influential and popular, earning them the suspicion of Sima Rui. At the same time, Sima Rui was also beginning to phase out the southern gentry clans in favour of the northern emigres families who were fleeing from the chaos in the north. (Note: The emigration intensified after the fall of Luoyang during the Disaster of Yongjia in July 311.) Zhou Qi resented the shift in favour, especially as he was personally belittled by one of the northern emigres, Diao Xie from the Diao clan of Bohai. Another member of the southern gentry, Wang Hui (王恢) also had a grudge with Zhou Yi from the Zhou clan of Runan, so he conspired with Zhou Qi to expel the northern emigres and restore the southern gentry to power with Zhou Qi and Dai Yuan of Guangling at the helm.

Wang Hui contacted a refugee leader along the Huai river, Xia Tie (夏鐵) in hopes of getting him to raise an army while he and Zhou Qi prepared in the "Three Wus" region (Wu, Wuxing and Kuaiji commanderies). Xia Tie gathered a few hundred men before the Administrator of Linhuai, Cai Bao attacked and killed him. Wang Hui was afraid that his scheme would be uncovered, so he fled to Zhou Qi. However, Zhou Qi then killed him and buried his body in a pig pen.

=== Death ===
Sima Rui found out about the plot, but pretended not to know at first. He invited Zhou Qi to serve as Grand Marshal Who Guards the East at Jianye. Along the way, the prince then promoted him to General Who Builds Martial Might and Administrator of Nan Commandery, so he diligently changed his course to Nan in the south. Once he passed by Wuhu, he received a praiseful imperial decree from Sima Rui, making him Army Libationer-Consultant and promoting his peerage to Duke of Wucheng. Zhou Qi was angry that he had been transferred three times in a short span of time, but also realized that his conspiracy had been discovered. The stress of the situation overwhelmed him and he soon died of illness at the age of 56 (by East Asian reckoning).

Before his death, Zhou Qi told his son, Zhou Xie, "It was those cangzi (傖子; derogatory term for northern emigres) who killed me. Avenge me and you can truly be my son." Sima Rui posthumously appointed him General Who Assists the State, and he received the posthumous name of "Zhonglie" (忠烈). (Note: Per vol.58 of Jin Shu, Zhou Qi's sons, younger brother Zhou Zha and Qi's nephews were later killed during Wang Dun's rebellion.)
