= Liu Hong (Jin dynasty) =

Western Jin dynasty governor

- 劉弘

Inspector of Jingzhou (荊州刺史)
- In office 303 – 306

Personal details
- Born: 236 Suixi County, Anhui
- Died: 306 (aged 69–70) Xiangyang, Hubei
- Relations: Liu Fu (grandfather)
- Children: Liu Fan
- Parent: Liu Jing
- Occupation: Governor
- Courtesy name: Heji (和季); Shuhe (叔和)
- Peerage: Duke of Xuancheng (宣城公)
- Posthumous name: Duke Yuan of Xincheng (新城元公)

Liu Hong (236 – 306), courtesy name Heji or Shuhe, was a military general and politician of the Jin dynasty (266–420). He was most known for his role as Inspector of Jingzhou between 303 and 306. After quelling the revolt of Zhang Chang, Liu Hong ushered Jingzhou into a brief period of peace and stability, making it a haven for refugees fleeing the various conflicts happening throughout most parts of China at the time. His administration made him a revered figure among the people, and traditional historians praised him as a model governor.

== Early life and career ==
Liu Hong was from Pei State, Xiang Commandery (相郡), which is around present-day Suixi County, Anhui. His grandfather was Liu Fu, an official under the late Han dynasty warlord Cao Cao and his father was Liu Jing, a minister in the Cao Wei dynasty. During his youth, Liu Hong resided in state capital Luoyang, where he was classmates with the future Emperor Wu of Jin, Sima Yan; the pair were also born in the same year. In February 266, Sima Yan usurped the Wei throne and established the Jin dynasty. Due to their past acquaintanceship, Sima Yan appointed Liu Hong Grandee at the Gate of the Heir Apparent as a token of friendship.

The Book of Jin describes Liu Hong as someone who excelled at strategy and statecraft. He served in a series of offices and was even an Army Advisor to the general Yang Hu at one point. Eventually, Liu Hong caught the attention of the prominent minister, Zhang Hua. Zhang Hua recommended Liu Hong to serve in the northern borders of Yuzhou as General Who Guards The Northern Frontier. In the north, Liu Hong asserted his authority, and reportedly, bandit activities in the region were near to none under him. For his conduct, both the people and officials praised Liu Hong, and the court awarded him the title of "Duke of Xuancheng".

== Zhang Chang's rebellion ==
In 303, a powerful revolt led by Zhang Chang broke out in Jingzhou. The Chief Controller of Jingzhou, Sima Xin (司馬歆; son of Sima Jun, Prince Wu of Fufeng), requested the court for reinforcements to help against the rebels. The court appointed Liu Hong as Inspector of Jingzhou and sent him, among others, to aid Sima Xin. Liu Hong and his fellow generals camped at Wancheng, but not long after, the rebels killed Sima Xin at Fancheng in June. The court chose Liu Hong to be Sima Xin's replacement, granting him the offices of General Who Guards The South and Chief Controller of Jingzhou. Liu Hong marched to the provincial capital of Xiangyang, but when Zhang Chang took the city of Wancheng, he retreated to camp at Liang County (梁縣; in present-day Ruzhou, Henan).

Later in the year, Zhang Chang's rebellion spread to Jiangzhou, Xuzhou, Yangzhou and Yuzhou. Liu Hong sent a group of generals, including Tao Kan, to attack Zhang Chang at Jingling while sending another group consisting of Li Yang (李楊) to capture Jiangxia. Tao Kan's group defeated Zhang Chang numerous times, and after a decisive victory, they forced Zhang Chang into hiding while his army surrendered to the Jin forces. Tao Kan distinguished himself in quelling the rebellion, which made him highly regarded by Liu Hong.

While Liu Hong was away, a general, Zhang Yi (張奕), was appointed by Jin to govern Xiangyang in his absence. With Zhang Chang no longer a threat, Liu Hong decided to return to Xiangyang and take control of Jingzhou. However, Zhang Yi refused to give up his position and began rallying his troops against Liu Hong. Liu Hong quickly marched to Xiangyang and beheaded Zhang Yi. He then reported the incident to the court, and the court ruled to exempt him from punishment. Liu Hong would only capture Zhang Chang in the spring of 304, after which he executed him and sent his head to the capital.

== Administration of Jingzhou ==
=== Policies and reforms ===
One of the first problems faced by Liu Hong upon retaking Xiangyang was a shortage of officials in the local government. To rectify this issue, Liu Hong asked and received the court's consent to personally hand out appointments so he could fill the vacant offices. Liu Hong reputedly appointed his candidates based on their merits and virtue. One case was his appointment of Pi Chu (皮初). Liu Hong wanted Pi Chu to be the Administrator of Xiangyang due to his merits, but the court, noting Pi Chu's lack of influence, opted for Liu Hong's son-in-law, Xiahou Zhi (夏侯陟). Liu Hong rhetorically asked, "There are ten commanderies in Jingzhou. If it is necessary that who I appoint must be married into my family, must I have ten son-in-laws before I could govern Jingzhou?" He sent a petition to the court asking Pi Chu to be justly rewarded while also pointing out that, as per tradition, he and a promoted relative by marriage cannot have mutual supervision over one another. The court agreed and gave the appointment to Pi Chu.

Liu Hong carried out several effective policies to improve the standard of living in Jingzhou. He allowed the people to fish at the lakes of Mount Xian (峴山; in present-day Xiangyang, Hubei) and Mount Fang (方山; in present-day Chibi, Hubei), which an ancient law had previously prohibited. Then, Liu Hong abolished the categorization of alcohol into qizhong liquor (齊中酒; for religious purposes), tingshi liquor (聽事酒; for officials) and wei liquor (猥酒; for peasants), permitting everyone to consume any sorts of alcohol as they please. Liu Hong heavily encouraged farming and sericulture to the people. He also lightened the severity of punishments and reduced taxes. These policies made Liu Hong a beloved figure in Jingzhou.

=== Assisting Luo Shang and refugees ===
In 304, the rebel leader, Li Xiong, ousted the Jin Inspector of Yizhou, Luo Shang, out from Chengdu. Luo Shang relocated himself to Jiangyang, where he requested food supply from Liu Hong. Liu Hong's account-keepers advised Liu Hong to give Luo Shang only 5,000 hú (斛) of rice, citing the long distance between the two governors and the food shortages in Jingzhou. However, Liu Hong wanted to ensure that Luo Shang would secure Jingzhou's western borders. Instead, he sent 30,000 hú of rice to Luo Shang and ordered his general, He Song (何松), to camp at Badong and serve as Luo Shang's reserve force.

At the same time, refugees were coming into Jingzhou to escape the wars and rebellions happening throughout China. These refugees often had to resort to banditry due to poverty. However, Liu Hong curbed this issue by distributing fields and seeds to the refugees. He also sought out talents among the refugees and appointed them to offices based on their capabilities. Due to his broad influence, an official of Liu Hong, Xin Ran (辛冉), recommended that he attempt to break away from Jin, but Liu Hong, in anger, had him executed. (Note: Xin Ran had previously convinced Sima Rong not to execute his half-brother Sima Lun's confidant Sun Xiu, and served under Luo Shang.)

Among those who fled to Jingzhou were performers of the imperial music bureau. Liu Hong's subordinates suggested that they invite the performers to play music for them. However, Liu Hong refused and alluded to the story of Du Kui and Liu Biao, believing that it would be inappropriate for him as a minister to have imperial music performed in his own court especially during a time of crisis. He comforted the performers by allowing them to settle in the commanderies and counties and returned them once the situation in the imperial court was stable.

=== War of the Eight Princes ===
In 305, the Prince of Donghai, Sima Yue, initiated a coalition to overthrow Emperor Hui of Jin's regent, the Prince of Hejian, Sima Yong. The Inspector of Yuzhou, Liu Qiao, joined the war on the side of Sima Yong, so the court published an edict calling for generals, including Liu Hong, to aid Liu Qiao against the coalition. Liu Hong was worried that the war would undermine the imperial family, so he wrote letters to Sima Yue and Liu Qiao, persuading them to stop, but neither side accepted his proposal. He then wrote a petition to the Jin court to convince Sima Yong to seek peace with Sima Yue. However, Sima Yong also dismissed him. With war being inevitable, Liu Hong decided to side with Sima Yue as he was appalled by Sima Yong's controversial marshal, Zhang Fang and believed Zhang Fang would bring about Sima Yong's downfall. Thus, Liu Hong sent an envoy to Sima Yue to convey his allegiance to him.

=== Chen Min's rebellion ===
At the end of 305, the Chancellor of Guangling, Chen Min, rebelled against Jin in the Jiangnan region. Liu Hong responded by sending Tao Kan and the Administrator of Wuling, Miao Guang (苗光), to camp at Xiaokou. However, there were suspicions about Tao Kan, as he was from the same commandery as Chen Min, and the two became officials around the same time. The Interior Minister of Sui, Hu Huai (扈懷), brought this matter to Liu Hong, but Liu Hong did not believe him. When Tao Kan heard about the allegations, he sent his son, Tao Hong (陶洪), and his nephew, Tao Zhen (陶臻), to explain his position. After asking the two for military advice, Liu Hong sent Tao Hong and Tao Zhen back with gifts, expressing his earnest trust in Tao Kan. When Chen Min invaded Jingzhou, Tao Kan joined with the other Jin generals in repelling him. In the end, the Jin forces thwarted Chen Min's ambitions to conquer Jingzhou.

As Chen Min's forces withdrew, the Administrator of Nanyang, Wei Zhan (衞展), advised Liu Hong to kill the general Zhang Guang, who, although had helped in defending Jingzhou, was friends with Sima Yong. Wei Zhan believed that killing Zhang Guang would show Liu Hong's loyalty to Sima Yue, but Liu Hong dismissed the suggestion. Instead, he sent a petition to the court asking them to promote Zhang Guang for his contributions.

== Death and posthumous events ==
In 306, Liu Hong intercepted the Prince of Chengdu, Sima Ying, from escaping to his fiefdom after Sima Yue's forces defeated him. Later, Sima Yue took Chang'an from Sima Yong and moved Emperor Hui to Luoyang. Liu Hong sent Liu Pan (劉盤) with troops to welcome the emperor back to the emperor. After Liu Pan returned from his commission, Liu Hong considered retiring due to his old age and wrote a letter to the court asking to divide his offices among his subordinates. However, before he could retire, Liu Hong died in Xiangyang. The people and officials of Jingzhou mourned Liu Hong's death as if they had lost a parent.

Soon after his death, Liu Hong's former marshal, Guo Mai (郭勱), rebelled and intended to make Sima Ying the leader. However, Liu Hong's son Liu Fan (劉璠) and general Guo Shu (郭舒) campaigned against Guo Mai and killed him. Liu Hong and Liu Fan's loyalty pleased Sima Yue, who wrote a letter of gratitude to Liu Fan. The court posthumously named him "Duke of Xincheng" and "Yuan" (元).

The Prince of Gaomi and younger brother of Sima Yue, Sima Lue, succeeded Liu Hong as Inspector of Jingzhou, but Lue was not as capable as Liu Hong, and Jingzhou saw a rise in dissidents and bandits. To appease the people, the court appointed Liu Fan as the Interior Minister of Shunyang (順陽; south of present-day Xichuan County, Henan). Liu Fan was just as beloved as his father, so the people living between the Han and Yangzi rivers began moving to live under Liu Fan. However, after Sima Lue died, his successor, Shan Jian, fearful that Liu Fan would use his popularity to rebel, requested the court to move Liu Fan to Luoyang. Shan Jian was a neglectful administrator, and his decision against Liu Fan proved unpopular with the people. Eventually, uprisings sprang up in the south, the most notable being the one led by Du Tao. As the situation in the south deteriorated, the people reportedly longed for Liu Hong's governance.

== Liu Hong's tomb ==
In March 1991, Liu Hong's tomb was discovered in Anxiang County, Hunan. Two gold seals with tortoise-shaped knobs, one titled "Seal of the General Who Guards the South" (鎮南將軍章) and another titled "Seal of the Duke of Xuancheng" (宣成公章), were among the artefacts excavated from the tomb.

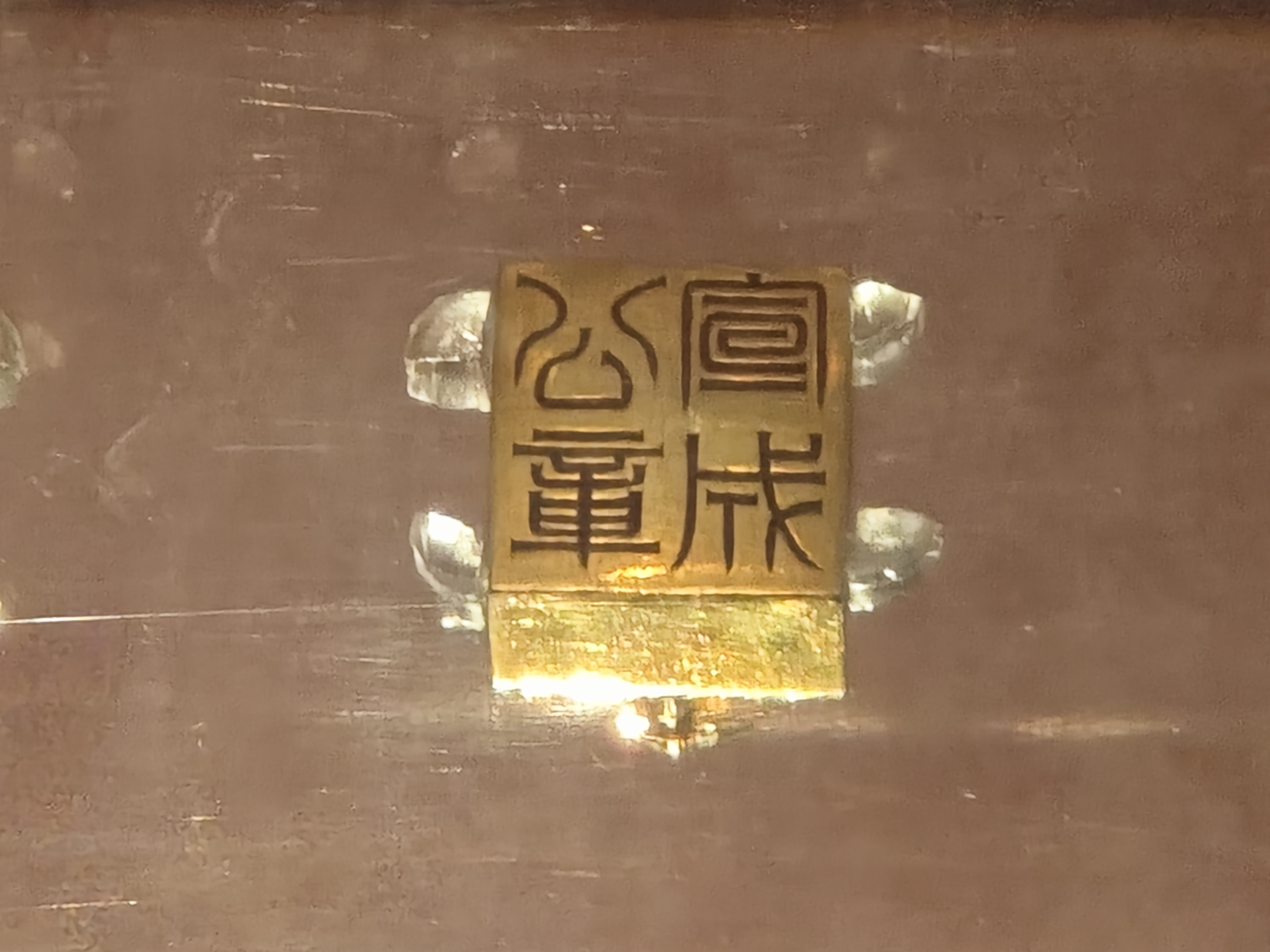
Golden Seal of Duke of Xuancheng

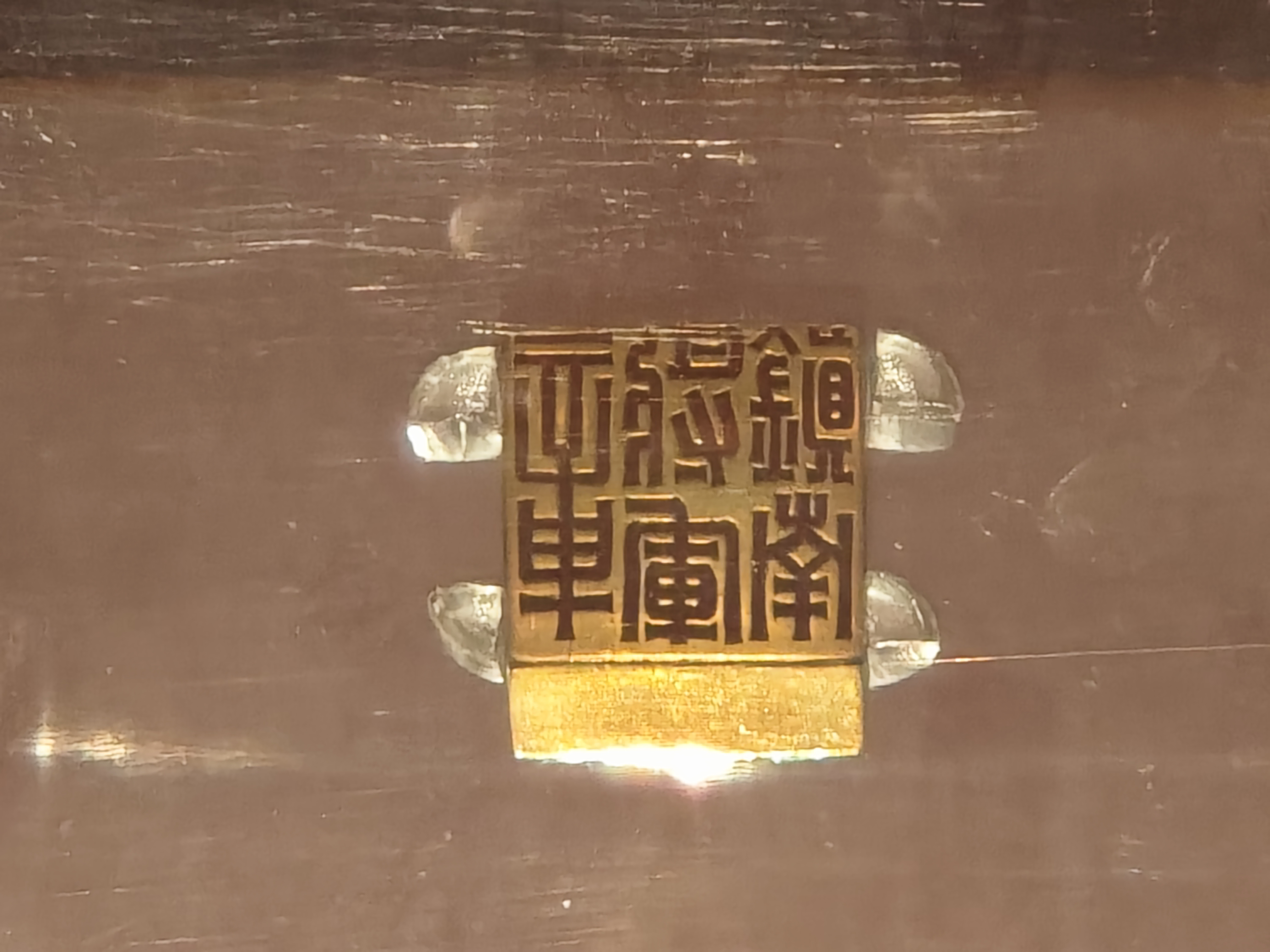
Golden Seal of the General Who Guards the South
