= Liu Wei (Jin dynasty) =

Chinese Jin and Later Zhao dynasties official (273-333)

- 劉隗

Inspector of Qing province (青州刺史)
- In office 321 – 322
- Monarch: Emperor Yuan of Jin

Personal details
- Born: 273 Xuzhou, Jiangsu
- Died: c.November 333 Tongguan County, Shaanxi
- Children: Liu Sui
- Parent: Liu Di (father)
- Courtesy name: Dalian (大連)
- Peerage: Marquis of Duxiang (都鄉侯)

Liu Wei (Note: The character "隗" has two pronunciations: "wěi" and "kuí".) (273 – c.November 333), courtesy name Dalian, was an official of the Jin dynasty (266–420) and the Later Zhao dynasty during the Sixteen Kingdoms period. He was the Director of Justice for the Prince of Langya and future Emperor Yuan of Jin, Sima Rui, who played a pivotal role in his plans to weaken the powerful Wang clan of Langya. In 322, Wang Dun, in retaliation to their attempts to undermine his clan's power, launched a rebellion against Emperor Yuan and specifically denounced Liu Wei for his crimes. After Emperor Yuan's defeat, Liu Wei fled north to Later Zhao, where he became an official and later died in a battle.

== Early life and career ==
Liu Wei was a native of Pengcheng Commandery from the county of the same name. He was a descendant of Emperor Gaozu of Han's younger brother, the Prince of Chu, Liu Jiao. His father Liu Di (劉砥) worked as the magistrate of Dongguang, while his uncle Liu Na (劉訥) was part of the famous "Twenty Four Friends of Jingu".

Liu Wei was fond of history and literature, and he was good at understanding people's intentions. He initially served as an Assistant in the palace library before becoming general of the vanguard and interior minister of Pengcheng. After the Disaster of Yongjia in 311, he fled south and became an Attendant Officer of the Household Gentlemen for the Prince of Langya, Sima Rui, who greatly trusted him as a minister.

== Service under Emperor Yuan ==
=== As Director of Justice ===
In 313, after Sima Rui became Imperial Chancellor of the Left, the prince appointed Liu Wei as his Director of Justice, tasking him with affairs of criminal justice. At the time, the Commandant of Jiankang arrested soldiers from the Protectorate Army, but the Protectorate Army department released them without authorization. Liu Wei impeached the general who protects the Army, Dai Yuan and removed him from his post.

Later, Liu Wei had Wang Jizhi (王籍之; cousin of Wang Dao) and the Libationer of the Eastern Pavilion, Yan Han (顏含) impeached for holding marriage ceremonies during mourning periods. He also had the Administrator of Lujiang, Liang Kan (梁龕) stripped of his office and marquisate for failing to observe the mourning period of his wife by hosting a banquet. The banquet goers were fined a month's salary, including the Secretary of Personnel, Zhou Yi. In 318, Liu Wei had Zhou Yi dismissed from his position after one of his students injured the Commandant of Jiankang.

Previously, Sima Rui was able to establish himself in the Jiangnan region through the help of the cousins, Wang Dun and Wang Dao, who came from the prestigious Wang clan of Langya. In his later years, however, he grew wary of the clan's growing influence and began closely surrounding himself with the likes of Liu Wei, Diao Xie, Dai Yuan and Zhou Yi to keep the Wang clan in check.

In 317, shortly after Emperor Min of Jin and Chang'an in the north were captured by the Han-Zhao dynasty, Sima Rui prepared to launch a northern expedition. However, as grain transports were slow to arrive, the transport director, Chunyu Bo (淳于伯) was wrongfully executed, and the mission had to be aborted. Liu Wei argued for Chunyu's innocence to the prince and specifically placed the blame on Zhou Yan (周筵) and Liu Yin (劉胤), both of whom had been backed by Wang Dao to their positions. Wang was forced to admit their faults and offered to resign, but Sima Rui rejected it and allowed Wang to retain his position.

The General of the Household Gentlemen of the South, Wang Han was the elder brother of Wang Dun, who was arrogant due to his familial background. He once recommended around twenty people to be appointed as his subordinates and officials, but they all proved unfit for their positions. Liu Wei submitted a scathing petition against Wang Han for his misdeeds. Though the matter was eventually resolved, the Wang clan began to despise Liu Wei.

=== Suppressing the Wang clan of Langya ===
Later in 317, when Sima Rui claimed the title of King of Jin, Liu Wei was promoted to Assistant to the Imperial Counsellor while concurrently serving as Palace Attendant. In 318, Sima Rui ascended the imperial throne, becoming known as Emperor Yuan of Jin. Liu Wei was bestowed the peerage of Marquis of Duxiang, and he was later transferred to Intendant of Danyang. Emperor Yuan allowed Liu Wei and Diao Xie to wield considerable power over the court as he began to sideline Wang Dao. Together, Liu and Diao implemented a series of harsh and detrimental policies to clamp down on the influential gentry families.

Outside of the capital, Wang Dun's power as a commander grew, so to counter him, Liu Wei and Sima Rui plotted to send out their partisans to hold military command on the border. In 321, Liu Wei was appointed General Who Guards the North, Chief Controller of military affairs in the Four Provinces of Qing, Xu, You, and Ping, and Inspector of Qing Province. He was garrisoned at Huaiyin (淮陰, in modern Huai'an, Jiangsu), while his fellow partisan, Dai Yuan was garrisoned at Hefei as Inspector of Si province.

Liu Wei continued to communicate with Sima Rui from his post, determining who among the officials in court he should promote or remove. The official reasoning for Liu and Dai Yuan's transfers was for them to lead expeditions against the barbarians states in northern China at the time, but Wang Dun suspected that these appointments were specifically targeted at him. He wrote a letter to Liu Wei, inviting him to join forces in a campaign against the north, but Liu Wei rejected his overture and reasserted his own loyalty to the imperial family, which angered Wang.

=== Wang Dun's first rebellion ===
In 322, Wang Dun raised an army at Wuchang against the imperial court under the pretext of punishing Liu Wei. He submitted a memorial with a list of Liu Wei's crimes, which includes slandering good officials, oppressing the people and exhausting the national treasury among others. When Wang's army reached Wuhu, he sent another memorial denouncing Diao Xie. Emperor Yuan wanted to personally lead the Six Armies to fight Wang Dun and ordered Dai Yuan and Liu Wei to return to Jiankang with reinforcements. When Liu Wei arrived at Jiankang, he was welcomed by a crowd of civil and military officials, who he spoke to calmly and eloquently. However, when he met Emperor Yuan, he and Diao Xie urged him to execute Wang Dao and the rest of his clan members who were in Jiankang. Emperor Yuan refused, which caused Liu Wei to become fearful for his life.

As Wang Dun's forces approached Jiankang, Emperor Yuan ordered Liu Wei to garrison Jincheng. Wang Dun initially wanted to attack Liu, but at the advice of his subordinate Du Hong, he changed his target to Shitou. The commander of Shitou, Zhou Zha (Note: brother of Zhou Qi and son of Zhou Chu), surrendered the city without a fight. Emperor Yuan sent Liu Wei, Diao Xie and the others to recapture Shitou, but they suffered a decisive defeat. Wang capitalized on his victory to enter Jiankang. When Liu Wei and Diao Xie retreated to the palace and met Emperor Yuan at the Taiji Hall (太極殿), he grabbed their hands, wept and urged them to flee Jiankang, providing them with troops to help them escape. Liu Wei then led his wife and several hundred confidants to seek refuge with the Later Zhao dynasty in the north.

== Life in Later Zhao and death ==
The ruler of Later Zhao, Shi Le appointed Liu Wei as the General Who Guards the South and rewarded him a marquisate. He eventually rose to the positions of Assistant Officer of the Household and Grand Tutor of the Crown Prince.

In 333, Shi Le's adoptive brother, Shi Hu seized control of the government after Shi Le's death in August and appointed Liu Wei as his Chief Clerk of the Left. Later that year, the Prince of Hedong, Shi Sheng and Shi Lang (石朗) raised their armies in the Guanzhong and Luoyang to oppose Shi Hu. In the course of the war, Shi Hu's forces under Shi Ting (石挺) suffered a defeat to Shi Sheng's general, Guo Quan at Tong Pass, where Liu Wei was killed in battle.
