= Gu Ti =

3rd century Eastern Wu official

- 顧悌

Lieutenant-General (偏將軍)
- In office ?–?
- Monarch: Sun Quan

Palace Gentleman (郎中)
- In office ?–?
- Monarch: Sun Quan

Personal details
- Born: Unknown Suzhou, Jiangsu
- Died: Unknown
- Relations: Gu Yong (relative); Gu Hui (relative); see also Gu clan of Wu
- Children: Gu Yan; Gu Li; Gu Qian; Gu Mi; Lu Ji's wife (Note: The Book of Song recorded that Gu Ti's son Gu Qian was Lu Ji's brother-in-law, and that Lady Gu was older than Gu Qian. This record was found in the biography of Gu Jizhi (顾觊之), who was a great-great-grandson of Gu Qian.)
- Parent: Gu Xiang (father)
- Occupation: Official
- Courtesy name: Zitong (子通)

Gu Ti (fl.first half of 3rd century CE), courtesy name Zitong, was an official of the state of Eastern Wu in the Three Kingdoms period of China. He was a relative of Gu Yong, the second Imperial Chancellor of Eastern Wu.

== Life ==
Gu Ti was from Wu County, Wu Commandery, which is present-day Suzhou, Jiangsu. He was from the same clan as Gu Yong. In his youth, he became famous among his fellow townsfolk after he was nominated as a xiaolian (civil service candidate). When he was 14 years old, he started serving as a low-level official in the local commandery office. As he grew older, he rose to the position of a Palace Gentleman (郎中) and was subsequently promoted to Lieutenant-General (偏將軍).

When Sun Quan, the founding emperor of Eastern Wu, was in his twilight years, a power struggle broke out between his sons Sun He and Sun Ba over the succession to their father's throne. The cause of the conflict was Sun Quan's failure to make a clear distinction between the statuses of the two princes. Although he already designated Sun He as the crown prince, he favoured Sun Ba and treated him exceptionally well. Gu Ti, along with the general Zhu Ju, often urged Sun Quan to follow Confucian rules of propriety and ensure that Sun He, as the legitimate heir apparent, received greater honours and privileges as compared to Sun Ba. They spoke in a very sincere and candid manner. Their colleagues in the imperial court were rather taken aback by their response.

Gu Ti was known for being very respectful towards his wife even though he spent little time with her. He often got home very late at night after work, and left home for work very early in the morning. On one occasion, when he fell sick at work, his wife came to visit him. He immediately instructed his subordinates to help him get dressed in proper attire and support him as he went out to meet his wife and ask her to go home. He earned much praise for his faithfulness towards his wife.

Gu Ti's father, Gu Xiang (顧向), consecutively served as the prefect of four counties throughout his career and still held office even in his old age. Whenever Gu Ti received a letter from his father, he washed up, dressed properly, laid out a straw mat and knelt on it as he read the letter. After reading every line, he responded as if he was attentively listening to his father speaking. After he finished reading the letter, he kowtowed as if his father was there for him to pay his respects to. When he received news that his father was ill, he shed tears and started sobbing.

After his father died of old age, Gu Ti was so upset that he did not eat and drink for five days. He refused to change out of his mourning attire until Sun Quan forced him to wear a linen robe without padding as a replacement for his mourning attire. Although Gu Ti had to restrain his grief so that he could continue with his career, he missed his father so much that he often drew images of a coffin on walls, set up altars, and started crying in front of them. He eventually died of grief before completing three years of filial mourning.

== Descendants ==
Gu Ti had four sons: Gu Yan (顧彥), Gu Li (顧禮), Gu Qian (顧謙) (Note: Gu Qian was later recommended by Gu Rong to serve under Sima Rui (Emperor Yuan of Jin).) and Gu Mi (顧祕; fl.260- early 310s). Gu Mi served as the governor of Jiao Province during the Jin dynasty, succeeding Wu Yan. Gu Mi's son, Gu Zhong (顧衆; 274-346), served as a Supervisor of the Masters of Writing (尚書僕射) in the Jin government. After Gu Mi's death, another son of Gu Mi, Gu Can (顧参), was forced by the people of Jiaozhou to take over his father's position; Gu Can died shortly after. Gu Can's younger brother Gu Shou (顧壽) then asked to become Inspector of Jiaozhou, but was initially rejected. After Gu Shou's insistence, the people of Jiaozhou relented. As Inspector, Gu Shou killed some officials including one Hu Zhao (胡肇), and wanted to kill Liang Shuo (梁硕). Liang managed to escape, and raised an army to attack Gu Shou; Gu Shou was captured and poisoned. (Note: The Zizhi Tongjian had a different account of the events surrounding Gu Shou and Liang Shuo: it indicated that Gu Shou directly succeeded his father as Inspector of Jiaozhou, and it was Liang Shuo who rose in rebellion and killed Gu Shou; Liang then became overall in-charge of Jiaozhou. Liang then surrendered to Tao Kan after Tao was sent by his superior Wang Dun to pacify Jiaozhou; he continued to be subservient until c.late 322, where Wang Dun's Inspector of Jiaozhou Wang Liang (王谅) tried to kill Liang. Liang then severely wounded Wang Liang (who later died of his injuries), and rebelled; he was eventually killed by Tao Kan's subordinate Gao Bao (高宝). See vol.92 of Zizhi Tongjian.) Gu Zhong, who was Gu Shou's younger brother, went to Jiaozhou to retrieve his elder brother's body. Due to Du Tao's rebellion, it took Gu Zhong six years to complete the journey.

Gu Qian's great-great-grandson Gu Jizhi (顾觊之; 392-467) served as an official in the Liu Song dynasty.

== See also ==
- Lists of people of the Three Kingdoms
