= Yuan Fu =

3rd-century Chinese noblewoman

- 袁福

Personal details
- Born: Unknown Deyang, Sichuan
- Died: Unknown
- Children: two sons

Yuan Fu (fl. 220s–230s), was a member of the Yuan clan in Deyang. She married a local tribal king and had two sons with him. Following his death, she deeply cared for their sons. As her family fell into poverty, she was forced to remarry to Zhang Feng. She wanted to kill him on the first day, but feared that such an act would bring harm and shame to her family. With deep sadness, she ended her life.

== Life ==
Yuan Fu was born in Deyang County, Guanghan Commandery (廣漢郡), which is present-day Deyang, Sichuan. She was the wife of a local tribal king. (Note: Taiping Yulan quotes Chen Shou's Yi Bu Qijiu Zaji.) She married him at the age of 20 (by East Asian age reckoning). After the death of her parents in law, she also suffered the loss of her husband and was deeply grieved for the rest of her life. She refrained from unnecessary talk and laughter. Raising her two sons with pure devotion. When another of her uncle fell into poverty, she was privately forced into marrying Zhang Feng. On the first day, she planned to kill Zhang Feng however she feared that the consequences would harm her mother, uncle and orphaned children. Furthermore, that hatred would ensue toward her clan. Overwhelmed by sorrow, she committed suicide. Chang Qu, who wrote her biography in the Chronicles of Huayang (Huayang Guo Zhi), lamented that her righteousness did not survive.

== See also ==
- Lists of people of the Three Kingdoms
