= Emperor Yuan of Jin =

Emperor of Chinese Jin dynasty from 318 to 323

Emperor Yuan of Jin 晉元帝
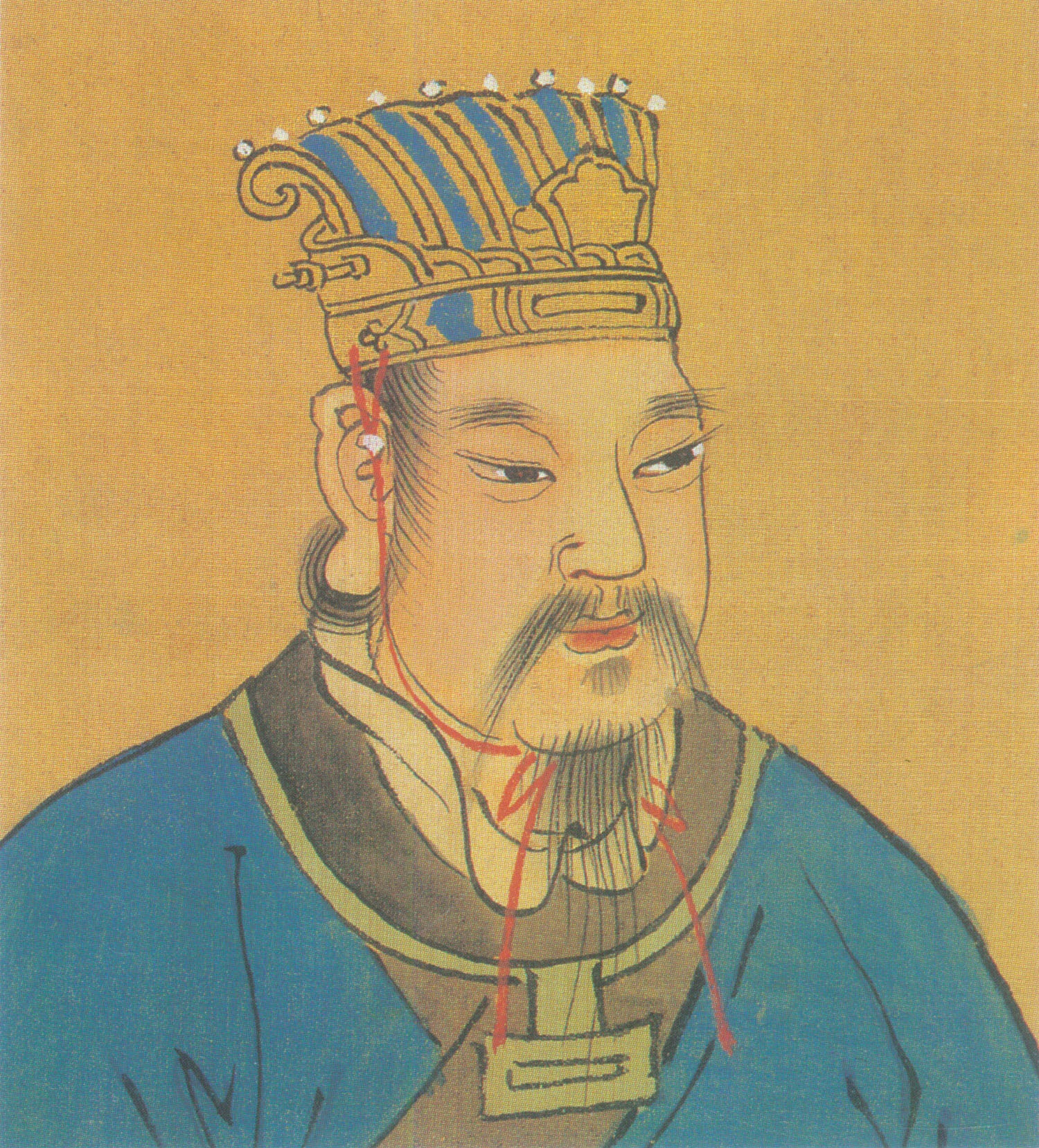
- Ming Dynasty portrait of Emperor Yuan

Emperor of the Jin dynasty
- Reign: 26 April 318 – 3 January 323
- Predecessor: Emperor Min
- Successor: Emperor Ming
- Born: 276
- Died: 3 January 323 (aged 47); Jiankang, Eastern Jin
- Burial: Jianping Mausoleum (建平陵), Nanjing, Jiangsu
- Consorts: Empress Yuanjing (Note: Emperor Yuan's biography in Book of Jin indicate that Lady Yu was posthumously named empress on 10 Oct 320.); Empress Dowager Jianwenxuan
- Issue: Emperor Ming; Emperor Jianwen
Full name
- Family name: Sima (司馬); Given name: Rui (睿)
Era dates
- Jianwu (建武): 317–318; Taixing (太興): 318–322; Yongchang (永昌): 322–323
Posthumous name
- Emperor Yuan (元皇帝)
Temple name
- Zhongzong (中宗)
- House: House of Sima
- Dynasty: Eastern Jin
- Father: Sima Jin
- Mother: Xiahou Guangji

Emperor Yuan of Jin (Chinese: 晉元帝; pinyin: Jìn Yuán Dì; Wade–Giles: Chin Yüan-ti; 276 – 3 January 323), personal name Sima Rui (司馬睿), courtesy name Jingwen (景文), was an emperor of the Jin dynasty and the first emperor of the Eastern Jin. He was the son of Sima Jin (司馬覲), the grandson of Prince of Langya Sima Zhou and the great-grandson of Sima Yi.

Yuan was stationed south of the Yangtze in Jiankang during the Upheaval of the Five Barbarians, where he avoided the chaos that befell northern China. Primarily through the help of cousins Wang Dun and Wang Dao, he emerged as an authority figure within the empire, backed by the southern gentry clans and northern emigre families who fled to his domain for refuge. After Emperor Min of Jin was executed by the Han-Zhao dynasty in 318, Yuan proclaimed himself emperor and moved the capital to Jiankang. At his death he left the state under the heel of Wang Dun, but the Eastern Jin dynasty – as it became known – lasted until its fall in July 420 and contended with the Sixteen Kingdoms in the north and (occasionally) in the southwest.

== Early life ==
Sima Rui was born in 276 in the Jin capital of Luoyang. He was the son of Sima Jin (司馬覲, heir to the princedom of Langya) and his wife, Xiahou Guangji (Chinese: 夏侯光姬; pinyin: Xiàhóu guāng jī (Note: Xiahou Guangji was a daughter of Xiahou Zhuang, son of Xiahou Wei, son of Xiahou Yuan.)). However, there is a rumour which originates from the Chronicles of Jin (晉陽秋), written by the Eastern Jin historian, Sun Sheng (302–373), that Sima Rui was the product of an affair between Xiahou Guangji and a kinsman of the Cao Wei general, Niu Jin. Sima Rui's grandfather Sima Zhou (prince of Langya and uncle of Emperor Wu of Jin) died in June 283, leaving Sima Jin to inherit the princedom; Xiahou became princess consort. Sima Jin died on 9 March 290 at age 35 (by East Asian reckoning), and Sima Rui became Prince of Langya. The Book of Jin described him as steady, quick-witted and magnanimous.

About two months after Sima Rui became Prince of Langya, Emperor Wu died. Wu's successor, Emperor Hui, was developmentally disabled and controlled by several regents during his reign. As the struggle to become Emperor Hui's regent (known as the War of the Eight Princes) intensified, Sima Rui remained aloof from political developments to protect himself. His ability to hide his talents ensured that most people were unaware of them. Ji Shao (Chinese: 嵇紹; pinyin: Jī Shào, son of Ji Kang), who was Palace Attendant, saw that Sima Rui was special: "The Prince of Langya has an extraordinary appearance, which does not belong to that of a subject."

In 304, during the War of the Eight Princes, Sima Rui joined the Prince of Donghai Sima Yue's campaign against the Prince of Chengdu Sima Ying as a minor general. After Sima Ying defeated Sima Yue, Sima Ying executed Sima Rui's uncle Sima Yao (Chinese: 司馬繇; pinyin: Sīmǎ yáo, prince of Dong'an) on 18 September. He fled back to his principality, Langxie – roughly modern Weifang, Shandong – under the counsel of Sima Yue's assistant Wang Dao, whom he befriended during the campaign. He first tried to return to Luoyang, but when he was about to cross the Yellow River he was stopped by guards who were instructed to stop any nobles or high-level officials from crossing; Sima Ying had ordered that, fearing that nobles would desert him or plot against him. His guard, Song Dian, (Chinese: 宋典; pinyin: Sòng diǎn (Note: In vol.85 of Zizhi Tongjian, Song's name was recorded as "Song Xing".)) arrived with the ruse that they were both construction workers; the guards then allowed them to cross. After Sima Rui arrived in Luoyang, he and his mother went to Langxie and spent the next few years away from the civil wars.

In August 307, Sima Yue had been victorious in the aftermath of the War of the Eight Princes as the regent for Emperor Huai (Emperor Hui's successor and half-brother) seven months earlier. Under the advice of his wife, Princess Pei, he commissioned Sima Rui as military commander of parts of Yang Province (Chinese: 揚州; pinyin: Yángzhōu, modern Zhejiang and southern Jiangsu and Anhui) south of the Yangtze with his post at Jianye. Before his appointment, the region was controlled by rebel general Chen Min from 305 to 307. Many of the southern gentry clans initially backed Chen Min, but became unhappy with his rule and returned to Jin by overthrowing him. His mother, Princess Dowager Xiahou, died during his first year at Jiangdong.

Among Sima Rui's staff, Wang Dao was a chief advisor. Since Sima Rui was not well known when he arrived in Jianye, few from the southern gentry clans would visit and support him. Under Wang Dao's counsel, Sima Rui visited He Xun (Chinese: 賀循; pinyin: Hè xún; great-grandson of He Qi) and Gu Rong (Chinese: 顧榮; pinyin: Gù róng; grandson of Gu Yong) and invited them to serve in his administration. He and Gu were well regarded by the local population, who eventually began to trust Sima Rui's leadership. Wang Dao and his cousin, general Wang Dun, served in key roles; it was said at the time that the Tianxia was ruled equally by the Simas and the Wangs.

While Sima Rui was in the south, Sima Yue was preoccupied with quelling rebellions and fighting the Han-Zhao dynasty in the north. Sima Rui was essentially out of Sima Yue's reach; for the first few years he had to check commander Zhou Fu, who controlled Yang province north of the Yangtze. The deadlock was finally broken in February 311 when Zhou Fu, under fire by the imperial court for suggesting that they move to his base in Shouchun, was forced into rebellion. Sima Rui, now with grounds to attack Zhou Fu, ordered his forces to march north of the Yangtze and annexed the rest of Yang Province.

== After the fall of Luoyang ==
In July 311, after Sima Yue died in April, Luoyang fell to Han forces and Emperor Huai was captured during the Disaster of Yongjia. A high-ranking minister, Xun Fan, escaped from Luoyang and founded a provisional government near the former capital. With Xun Fan's assent, Sima Rui began to exercise more imperial power; he was proclaimed leader of the Jin alliance, and was given authority to appoint and dismiss chief officials. With many officials fleeing south of the Yangtze, Wang Dao advised Sima Rui to recruit talented men from northern emigre families to serve in his administration. Sima Rui chose more than a hundred officials from the northern emigres, and they were known as the "106 Officials".

South of the Huai river and west of Sima Rui, Jiang province (Chinese: 江州; pinyin: Jīangzhōu, modern Jiangxi) inspector Hua Yi and Yu province (Chinese: 豫州; pinyin: Yùzhōu, present-day central Anhui) inspector Pei Xian refused to acknowledge Sima Rui's authority. The prince sent Wang Dun to campaign against them, killing Hua and forcing Pei to flee before replacing them with his own followers. In the central Yangtze region, the provinces of Jing (Chinese: 荊州; pinyin: Jīngzhōu, present-day Hubei) and Xiang (Chinese: 湘州; pinyin: Xiāng zhōu, present-day Hunan) had been struggling with a refugee crisis due to the war with the Cheng-Han dynasty in Sichuan. These refugees (primarily led by Du Tao) rebelled in 311, ousting the inspector of Xiang and defeating the inspector of Jing Wang Cheng (younger brother of Wang Yan). Sima Rui expanded his influence into the central Yangtze, installing his own Inspector of Xiang and convincing Wang Cheng to resign. Forces commanded by Wang Dun and other generals, including Tao Kan and Zhou Fang, managed to subjugate the agrarian rebels resisting Jin rule in Jing and Xiang.

Although Sima Rui had initially relied on the southern gentry clans to consolidate his rule in the Jiangnan, he began relying more on the northern emigre families as they continued to flock to him. The southern gentry were divided about his shift of trust; most were willing to tolerate it, but others (such as Zhou Qi from the Zhou clan of Yixing) became resentful of the northern emigres. The hardliners rallied around Zhou Qi and his family to oust the northern emigres and force Sima Rui to restore the southern clans to power. Their conspiracies in 313 and 315 were exposed and did not attract enough support, however, and failed to have a significant impact on Sima Rui.

In 313, after Emperor Huai was executed by the Han, Sima Ye – a nephew of Emperor Huai – was declared emperor (and posthumously known as Emperor Min) in Chang'an. Due to the naming taboo against Emperor Min's given name of "Ye" (業), Sima Rui's headquarters – Jianye (建業) – was renamed Jiankang (建康), a name it kept for several centuries. Sima Rui accepted the title of Left Prime Minister, but took no actions in aid of the emperor. When Sima Ye was alive, the prince showed little interest in lending his forces to help pacify the north. When his general and former refugee leader Zu Ti asked to lead an army north, he gave Zu supplies for only one thousand men with no actual troops; Zu had to enlist his own soldiers before recovering a number of cities south of the Yellow River.

Chang'an fell to Han forces in 316, and Emperor Min was captured. Sima Rui declared that he was going to act against Han, but then claimed a lack of supplies and cancelled the campaign. In spring 317, his officials asked him to take the throne. Sima Rui declined initially but took the title "King of Jin" (a title previously used by Sima Zhao and Emperor Wu while they were regents of Cao Wei), rather than emperor, on 6 April 317. He made his son, Sima Shao, crown prince on 1 May of that year.

== Early reign and loss of Northern China ==
Liu Cong, emperor of Han-Zhao, executed Emperor Min on 7 February 318. News of Emperor Min's execution reached Jiankang on 23 April, and Sima Rui declared himself emperor three days later. The areas under his control were roughly south of the Yellow River and east of the Three Gorges, although pockets of Jin territory in the north—including Youzhou (modern Beijing, Tianjin, and northern Hebei), controlled by the ethnic Xianbei governor Duan Pidi—largely recognized him as emperor. Zhang Shi, governor of Liang Province (modern central and western Gansu), did not use his era names and continued to use Emperor Min's era name of Jianxing (hinting at non-recognition). He was non-committal about Sima Bao's (prince of Nanyang) claim as emperor, despite his alliance with his father Zhang Gui and the relationship of his domain to the Zhang clan. Zhang Shi believed that Emperor Yuan would be a more effective emperor but retained Emperor Min's era name, another sign that the Zhang clan sought eventual independence from the Jin. Later that year, when Han-Zhao emperor Liu Can was overthrown by Jin Zhun (who initially indicated that he was submitting to Emperor Yuan's authority), Yuan sent an army to support Jin Zhun. Long before the army could get there, however, Jin Zhun was defeated by new Han-Zhao emperor Liu Yao and general Shi Le.

In 319, Duan Pidi's forces fell to Shi Le (who had declared independence from Han-Zhao as declared by Liu Yao, establishing Later Zhao that year). Duan fled to another governor loyal to Jin, Shao Xu, governor of Ji Province (Chinese: 冀州; pinyin: Jìzhōu, in present-day central Hebei). The following year, Shi Le sent his generals Shi Hu and Kong Chang to capture Shao. They were successful, but Duan Pidi took control of Shao's forces and again led the resistance in the north. The remaining Jin resistance west of Chang'an (Northwest China) began to falter as they began an internal conflict. Sima Bao (who had declared himself prince of Jin the previous year and did not recognize the emperor), apparently experiencing famine and facing Han-Zhao invasion, tried to escape to Zhang Shi's domain but was denied by Zhang Shi's forces. Presumably facing resistance by generals Yang Tao (楊韜) and Chen An, he was apparently murdered by generals Zhang Chun (Chinese: 張春; pinyin: Zhāng chūn) and Yang Ci (Chinese: 楊次; pinyin: Yáng cì) and replaced with Sima Zhan. Han-Zhao forces led by Chen An attacked Sima Zhan's domain in revenge, killing him and Zhang and capturing Yang, ending Jin resistance in Qin Province.

Zhang Shi was assassinated by his guards Yan She (閻涉) and Zhao Ang (趙卬) the following year, acting from rumors spread by magician Liu Hong (劉弘). Because Zhang's son was still young, his brother and successor Zhang Mao executed Liu Hong and declared a general amnesty (declaring his domain independent from the Jin). Zhang Mao began using the era name "Yongguang" (永光) internally, using "Jianxing" in communications with other states – evidence that Zhang Mao's domain was independent from the Jin, although he continued to refer himself as governor of Liang Province. This ended Jin rule in Northwest China; his domain evolved into the vassal state of Former Liang by Zhang Jun's rule. By 321, Shao Xu's forces collapsed and Duan Pidi was captured by Shi Le; this ended his resistance and Jin rule north of the Yellow River, although Xianbei chief Murong Hui (the duke of Liaodong) still controlled present-day Liaoning and considered himself a Jin vassal.

== Late reign and confrontation with Wang Dun ==
By 320, Emperor Yuan's relationship with Wang Dun was at a breaking point as Wang Dun became more and more arrogant and controlling of the western provinces. Emperor Yuan feared him and surrounded himself with men who also opposed Wang Dun, such as Liu Wei and Diao Xie (刁協) – men of mixed reputation who, in their efforts to suppress the Wangs' power, offended many people.

Emperor Yuan commissioned Dai Yuan and Liu with substantial forces in 321, saying that they were to defend against Later Zhao attacks but intending them to defend against a Wang Dun attack. The general charged with protecting against Later Zhao attacks was Zu Ti, by now governor of Yu Province under Jin. Zu Ti, popular with those he governed, held off Later Zhao attacks. The following year, Chen Chuan (陳川) defected; Zu was defeated, but Shi could not advance. This led to a stalemate, followed by an informal détente in which peace and trade relations were instituted with the Yellow River as the border. When Zu Ti died, no one on the Jin side was checking Later Zhao expansion; the region's balance of power vacillated between clans affiliated with the Jin and Zhao regimes. Others included Cao Ni (a renegade general who ruled Qing Province) and Xu Kan, the general who surrendered to Jin. Both had a history of conflicts with the Jin, and were quickly defeated by Later Zhao general Shi Hu. Jin could not hold onto these territories between the Yellow and Huai Rivers, and gradually lost them. By Cao Ni's death, Jin had probably lost those territories until they were recovered by Huan Wen during the reign of Emperor Mu of Jin.

Wang Dun began his campaign against Emperor Yuan in spring 322, saying that Emperor Yuan was being deluded by Liu and Diao and he only intended to clean up the government. He tried to persuade Gan Zhuo, governor of Liang Province (present-day northwestern Hubei and southeastern Shaanxi) and Sima Cheng (司馬承, governor of Xiang Province) to join him; both resisted, but neither was effective in their campaigns against his rear guards. Wang quickly arrived in Jiankang, defeating Emperor Yuan's forces and entering and pillaging Jiankang. Liu fled to Later Zhao, and Diao, Dai, (Note: The Jin Chun Qiu recorded that after Wang Dun's rebellion was crushed during Emperor Ming's reign, Wang's subordinate Qian Feng was killed by Dai's younger brother (戴良). However, the Tang-era Jin Shu recorded in Wang Dun's biography that Qian was killed by Zhou Guang (周光); Sima Guang adopted the account in Wang Dun's biography.) and Zhou Yi were killed. Emperor Yuan was forced to submit and grant Wang Dun additional powers in the west. Wang Dun allowed Emperor Yuan to remain on the throne, and withdrew to his home base of Wuchang. His forces defeated and killed Sima Cheng and a subordinate of Gan, acting on Wang's orders, assassinated Gan.

After his defeat, Emperor Yuan grew despondent and ill and died in January 323. Crown Prince Shao succeeded to the throne as Emperor Ming.

== Era names ==
- Jianwu (建武): 6 April 317 – 26 April 318
- Taixing (太興): 26 April 318 – 3 February 322
- Yongchang (永昌): 3 February 322 – 22 April 323

== Family ==
- Empress Yuanjing of the Yu clan (元敬皇后 虞氏, 277–312); personal name Mengmu (孟母)
- Empress Dowager Jianwenxuan of the Zheng clan of Xingyang (簡文宣皇太后 滎陽鄭氏, d. 326); personal name Achun (阿春)
  - Sima Huan, Prince Dao of Langxie (琅邪悼王 司馬煥, 317–318), fifth son
  - Sima Yu, Emperor Jianwen (簡文皇帝 司馬昱, 320–372), sixth son
  - Princess Xunyang (尋陽公主, b. 323)
    - Married Xun Xian of Yingchuan (潁川 荀羨, 322–359) in 336
- Jieyu, of the Shi clan (婕妤 石氏)
  - Sima Chong, Prince Ai of Donghai (東海哀王 司馬衝, 311–341), third son
- Cairen, of the Wang clan (才人 王氏)
  - Sima Xi, Prince Wei of Wuling (武陵威王 司馬晞, 316–381), fourth son
- Lady, of the Xun clan (豫章君 荀氏, d. 335)
  - Sima Shao, Emperor Ming (明皇帝 司馬紹, 299–325), first son
  - Sima Pou, Prince Xiao of Langxie (琅邪孝王 司馬裒, 300–317), second son

== Notes ==
Emperor Yuan of Jin House of Sima Born: 276 Died: 3 January 323
Regnal titles
Preceded by Himself as Prince of Jin	Emperor of China; Eastern Jin; 318–323	Succeeded by Emperor Ming of Jin
Chinese royalty
Preceded by Emperor Min of Jin as Empire of China	Prince of Jin; 317–318	Succeeded by Himself as Empire of China
