= Zhou Qi (writer) =

Qing dynasty person

Zhou Qi 周綺，(1814–1861) courtesy name Lujun 绿君, childhood name Qinniang 琴娘 was a Chinese woman writer, poet and painter during the Qing dynasty. She was a painter who wrote both poetry and prose in response to the novel Hong lou meng (Dream of the Red Chamber), making her one of the earliest women writers who commented on the novel. She was married to Wang Xilian 王希廉, probably as a concubine rather than a principal wife.

Zhou was born in Changshu adopted by her uncle, her mother's elder brother, from whom she took her family name (Zhou). She had some knowledge of medicine, and her filial piety led her to cut flesh from her own body to make medicine for her mother.

== Literary studies and Dream of the Red Chamber ==
Zhou Qi was associated with the circle of poets which surrounded the scholar Yuan Mei. and was a disciple of Chen Wenshu, a prominent woman writer of the early 19th century. She is also known for the colophon on a painting by Wang Qiao, "A Woman at Her Dressing Table."

In an essay she writes of coming across a copy of Dream of the Red Chamber which her husband had left on his desk. She found that the novel

takes human feelings and social relations and locates them in the world of powder and rouge, the world of women.... Among the book's emotional events, many are, of course, fully realized, but there are still some which are not fully realized.

These feelings led her to write ten poems on the female characters, after which she is exhausted and falls asleep. When an old man appears in the dream and scolds her for her poems, she quotes Confucius to defend poems that deal with the emotions.

Her writings on the novel are collected in Honglou meng ti ci. Some of her poems are contained in the set of illustrations of characters in the novel done by the artist Gai Qi. Ellen Widmer, among other scholars, has translated her poetry.
