= Chen Min (Jin dynasty) =

Jin dynasty (266–420) rebel (died 307)

- 陳敏

Inspector of Yangzhou (self-appointed) (揚州刺史)
- In office 305 – 307

Grand Marshal (self-appointed) (大司馬)
- In office 305 – 307

Personal details
- Born: unknown Lujiang County, Anhui
- Died: 307 Nanjing, Jiangsu
- Children: Chen Jing
- Courtesy name: Lingtong (令通)
- Peerage: Duke of Chu (self-proclaimed) (楚公)

Chen Min (died c.April 307), courtesy name Lingtong, was a military general and rebel of the Jin dynasty (266–420). He was initially a logistics director who rose to prominence for his role in Zhang Chang's rebellion, in which he defeated the rebels' top commander, Shi Bing. However, during Sima Yue's coalition against Sima Yong in 305, Chen Min took the opportunity to rebel and occupy the Jiangnan region with the backing of the former Eastern Wu gentry clans. He controlled Jiangnan until 307, when the gentry clans, angered by his lackluster rule, revolted and killed him.

== Early life and career ==
Chen Min was a native of Lujiang Commandery (廬江郡; around present-day Lu'an, Anhui). He was talented at a young age and became an official in the same year as a fellow commandery native, Tao Kan. Eventually, he was nominated as Filial and Incorrupt and became a Granary Clerk of the Masters of Writing.

In 301, the three princes, Sima Ying, Sima Yong and Sima Jiong, held a coalition to overthrow Emperor Hui of Jin's regent and usurper, Sima Lun. The coalition forces occupied the capital of Luoyang and stayed there for a lengthy period. The city had to keep the soldiers fed, and eventually, there was a food shortage. To resolve this crisis, Chen Min suggested to the court that they transport the abundance of food from southern China to the capital. The court agreed with his proposal, so they appointed him Logistical Director and transferred him to Hefei and later to Guangling.

== Shi Bing's rebellion ==
In 303, a Man official named Zhang Chang started a rebellion in Jingzhou, which later spread to Jiangzhou, Xuzhou, Yangzhou and Yuzhou. The Inspector of Jingzhou, Liu Hong, defeated him and forced him into hiding, but Zhang Chang's general, Shi Bing, still had a sizeable army under his command. Shi Bing had captured Yangzhou when Zhang Chang fled and was marching his troops to take Shouchun. The commander in Shouchun, Liu Zhun (劉準), panicked and was indecisive on what to do. Chen Min was in Shouchun at the time, and he reassured Liu Zhun that morale in Shi Bing's army was low. Chen Min also volunteered to lead the army against the rebels, which Liu Zhun permitted.

Chen Min and Shi Bing fought each other in several battles. Shi Bing's soldiers vastly outnumbered Chen Min's, but Chen Min won in every bout they engaged. In 304, Chen Min and another general, Zhou Qi, besieged Shi Bing at Jiankang. Shi Bing fled to Xuzhou to seek refuge with a fellow rebel leader, Feng Yun (封雲), but Chen Min turned around and attacked Feng Yun. Eventually, Feng Yun's general, Zhang Tong (張統), beheaded the two rebel leaders and surrendered in c.May. Shi Bing's death effectively ended the rebellion, although Jin would only capture Zhang Chang later in the year. For his contributions, the court made Chen Min the Chancellor of Guangling.

== Chen Min's rebellion ==
=== War of the Eight Princes ===
Despite displaying loyalty to Jin against Zhang Chang, Chen Min secretly had ambitions to establish a state. His victory over Shi Bing changed his attitude, as he reputedly became arrogant about his ability. In 305, the civil war in the north between the Prince of Hejian, Sima Yong, and the Prince of Donglai, Sima Yue, also made Chen Min's plans appear plausible. When Chen Min's father heard of his son's behaviour, he became angry and exclaimed that Chen Min would bring about his family's demise. He died shortly after, and Chen Min resigned to mourn him.

Sima Yue wanted Chen Min to join his side in the war, so he appointed Chen Min General of the Right and Commander of the Vanguard in his march to take Chang'an. He also sent Chen Min a flattering letter, and in the end, Chen Min agreed to support him. During Sima Yue's campaign against Sima Yong's Inspector of Yuzhou, Liu Qiao, Chen Min led his army to help, but Liu Qiao defeated them at Xiao County. Following their loss at Xiao, Chen Min returned east to Liyang to recruit more soldiers.

Coincidentally, while Chen Min was in Liyang, the Regular Attendant to the Prince of Wu, Gan Zhuo, arrived from Luoyang. Gan Zhuo had abandoned his office to escape the war in the north and wanted to return to his hometown. However, Chen Min saw Gan Zhuo as his opportunity to start his rebellion. Chen Min convinced Gan Zhuo to impersonate an envoy from the Crown Younger Prince, Sima Ying, delivering a decree to Chen Min. He also married his son, Chen Jing (陳景), to Gan Zhuo's daughter, sealing their alliance, and soon after, Gan Zhuo appointed Chen Min the Inspector of Yangzhou.

=== Taking over Jiangnan ===
Chen Min appointed more than forty members of the gentry clans of Jiangnan to serve under him. To win the gentry's support, Chen Min initially acted respectfully and generous toward them. He even provided salaries to those too ill or too old to take up the offices. His brother, Chen Chang (陳昶), was distrustful of the gentry and wanted him to execute them instead. However, at the advice of one of the appointees, Gu Rong, Chen Min decided against it.

Chen Min sent his brother, Chen Hui (陳恢), to invade Jiangzhou and another brother, Chen Bin (陳斌), to invade Yangzhou. The two provinces did not anticipate Chen Min's attack. The Inspector of Yangzhou, Liu Ji (劉機), the Inspector of Jiangzhou, Ying Miao (應邈), and many other administrators fled their cities, allowing Chen Min's forces to occupy them. Chen Min's territory encompassed the ancient domains of the Wu and Yue states. Afterwards, Chen Min instructed his subordinates to acclaim him the Chief Controller of Jiangdong, Grand Marshal and the Duke of Chu and bestow him the Nine Bestowments. He also claimed he received an imperial edict that granted him control over the territory from the Yangzi to the Mian (沔水) and Han rivers, where he would welcome the emperor from the north.

=== Invasion of Jingzhou ===
Chen Min's rebellion caught the attention of Sima Yong, who sent his general, Zhang Guang, to campaign against Chen Min. The Inspector of Jingzhou, Liu Hong, also joined Zhang Guang to fight the rebellion. At the end of 305, Chen Min aimed to conquer Jingzhou, so Chen Min appointed Chen Hui as his Inspector of Jingzhou and sent him to invade the province. Chen Hui led his troops to take Wuchang, but the Jin forces routed him numerous times. The Jin army then defeated Chen Min's general, Qian Duan (錢端), at Zhangqi (長岐; in present-day Jiangxia District, Hubei). Chen Min's defeat in Jingzhou discouraged him from encroaching on the province for the remainder of his revolt.

=== Gentry revolt and death ===
By 307, Chen Min had lost most of his support from the people under him. The law and government of his domain were incoherent, and his brothers and sons were violent and conniving. He failed to attract local talents to his administration, and even those who accepted him at first, like Gu Rong and Zhou Qi, were worried that they would suffer from associating with Chen Min. That year, Jin's Interior Minister of Lujiang, Hua Tan (華譚), wrote letters to Gu Rong and others urging them to revolt against Chen Min. They agreed and even swore a pledge of trust by cutting off their hair. (Note: Cutting off one's hair was akin to staking one's honour on something, hair being something given to one by one's parents according to Confucianism. Just before the Battle of Shiting, the Wu commander Zhou Fang was said to fool Wei commander Cao Xiu successfully due to him cutting his hair as part of his mock surrender.)

The conspirators informed the Jin general, Liu Zhun, of their plot, so he coordinated an attack on Liyang while they worked from the inside. Chen Min was in Jiankang, and the attack coerced Chen Min to send his brothers, Chen Chang and Chen Hong (陳宏), to defend Wujiang (烏江; southeast of present-day Dingyuan County, Anhui) and Niuzhu (牛渚; southwest of present-day Ma'anshan, Anhui) with thousands of soldiers. Another brother, Chen Chu (陳處), saw through the conspirators' plans, so he urged Chen Min to execute them. However, Chen Min did not believe him and disregarded his advice.

Chen Chang's Marshal, Qian Guang (錢廣), was from the same commandery as Zhou Qi, so Zhou Qi secretly convinced him to assassinate Chen Chang. After killing Chen Chang, Qian Guang spread a false claim that Chen Min was dead and threatened anyone who refused to take his order with execution. Qian Guang marched south of the Zhuque Bridge (朱雀橋; south of present-day Nanjing), so Chen Min sent Gan Zhuo and Gu Rong to face him. However, Gu Rong and Zhou Qi also convinced Gan Zhuo to defect. After destroying the bridge and gathering the boats, Gan Zhuo advanced toward Jiankang with Gu Rong and Zhou Qi.

Chen Min personally went out with his army to fight Gan Zhuo. However, Chen Min's soldiers were demoralized when news of Gu Rong and Zhou Qi's defections reached them. They were so unwilling to fight that when Gu Rong waved a white feather fan signalling them to disperse, they willingly scattered and fled. As his army collapsed, Chen Min rode on a horse alone to flee north, but the Jin soldiers caught up with him and captured him at Jiangcheng (江乘; in present-day Xianlin University City, Jiangsu). Before his death, Chen Min lamented that Gu Rong and the others had misled him. He also expressed regret over not listening to Chen Chu's advice. Chen Min was beheaded in Jiankang, and his head was delivered to Luoyang. His family was also executed to the third degree, and the commanderies in his domain had his younger brothers killed.
