= Zhang Chang (Jin dynasty) =

Western Jin dynasty rebel (died 304)

- 張昌

Chancellor of State (self-appointed) (相國)
- In office 303 – 304
- Monarch: Qiu Chen

Personal details
- Born: Unknown Zaoyang, Hubei
- Died: 304
- Nickname: Li Chen (李辰)

Zhang Chang (died 304), also known as Li Chen, was a Man rebel during the Jin dynasty (266–420). In 303, Zhang Chang led a great rebellion against Jin in Jingzhou. Under the guise of restoring the Han dynasty, Zhang Chang propped up a man named Qiu Chen (丘沈), whom he renamed Liu Ni (劉尼), to be a descendant of the Han emperors and the nominal leader of the rebellion. At its peak, Zhang Chang's rebellion encompassed most of the provinces of Jing, Jiang, Xu, Yang and Yu. Despite causing much trouble for Jin, the rebellion only lasted a year before the Inspector of Jingzhou, Liu Hong, defeated and killed him in 304.

== Background ==
Zhang Chang was from an ethnic minority tribe in Yiyang Commandery (義陽郡; around present-day Zaoyang, Hubei), Jingzhou. He became a county official in Pingshi County (平氏縣; northwest of Tongbai County, Henan) at a young age and had strong martial prowess. Zhang Chang often practised divination, which gave him the belief that he would one day be rich. Zhang Chang also enjoyed discussing warfare, but his peers mocked him because of it.

== Zhang Chang's rebellion ==
At the turn of the fourth century CE, many refugees entered Yizhou to flee Qi Wannian's rebellion, famine and plague in the Guanzhong region. In 301, the Jin court ordered these refugees to return home, believing the Guanzhong to be stable again. Zhang Chang, an Imperial Secretary at the time, became tasked with supervising the refugees with their return. However, the plan fell through as the refugees, led by Li Te, revolted in Yizhou against the court's order.

The rebellion continued into 303. At the same time, the Prince of Xinye, Sima Xin (司馬歆; son of Sima Jun, Prince Wu of Fufeng), was Chief Controller of Jingzhou. His administration over the province was strict and harsh, with the ethnic minority tribes bearing the brunt. Zhang Chang, a tribesman himself, went into hiding for half a year. He began recruiting thousands of followers under his wing with the intention to rebel. He used a stolen army banner and pretended to recruit soldiers to fight Li Liu (Li Te's brother who took over his rebellion) in Yizhou.

In June 303, the Jin court issued the "Renwu Draft" (壬午兵), which ordered the drafting of men to fight against Li Liu's rebellion. The draft was negatively received, as many did not want to travel deep into Yizhou to fight, and officials in the south began forming outlaw gangs to evade the draft. Many refugees were also entering Jiangxia Commandery due to an abundant harvest there.

=== Taking Jiangxia ===
These factors prompted Zhang Chang to step out of hiding and begin his rebellion. Zhang Chang changed his name to Li Chen (李辰) and recruited more followers at Mount Shiyan (石巖山; in present-day Anlu, Hubei). Many of the draft evaders and refugees flocked to him, thus increasing his numbers. The Administrator of Jiangxia, Gong Qin (弓欽), campaigned against Zhang Chang but to no avail. Zhang Chang then attacked Jiangxia's capital and forced Gong Qin to flee, placing the commandery under his command. Zhang Chang also repelled an attack by Sima Xin's general, Jin Man (靳滿).

In Jiangxia, Zhang Chang began to spread a prophecy of a sage who would arrive and lead the people. He then picked a man from Shandu County (山都縣; northwest of present-day Xiangyang, Hubei) named Qiu Chen, renamed him Liu Ni and falsely claimed that Qiu Chen was a descendant of the Han dynasty emperors. Zhang Chang asserted that the prophesized sage was Qiu Chen and declared him the Son of Heaven, although Qiu Chen's power was only nominal. Zhang Chang made himself Qiu Chen's Chancellor of State and introduced a new era name: Shenfeng (神鳳). He also produced fake phoenix and jade ornaments for Qiu Chen and attempted to emulate the lifestyle of the Han dynasty by copying their sacrificial rituals and clothing. To force the people into joining his army, Zhang Chang executed those who refused to join along with their families.

=== Killing Sima Xin ===
Soon, Zhang Chang spread a rumour claiming that the Jin court had sent a large army to kill everyone, seeing that all in the south had risen in revolt. Zhang Chang's ruse spread quickly and instilled fear in many southerners. Those living between the Han and Yangzi rivers joined Zhang Chang quickly, and within a month, Zhang Chang amassed an army of 30,000 strong. Zhang Chang's followers wore crimson hats on their heads and horse tails as beards.

Sima Xin sent the Jin court a petition requesting reinforcements. The court dispatched the generals, Liu Hong and Liu Qiao, to assist Sima Xin. Zhang Chang's general, Huang Lin (黃林), led 20,000 soldiers to invade Yuzhou, but Liu Qiao defeated him.

Sima Xin sent another petition to the court, this time asking permission to set out and campaign against Zhang Chang. However, the emperor's regent, Sima Ai, was suspicious of Sima Xin's motives and believed Xin wanted to collude with the Prince of Chengdu, Sima Ying, to form a coalition against him. Therefore, Sima Ai rejected the petition. Meanwhile, Zhang Chang's army continued to grow. Sima Xin was conflicted on whether to march out or stay in his position. When Zhang Chang reached Sima Xin's base in Fancheng, Sima Xin chose to go out and fight, but his army scattered, and the rebels killed him.

=== Peak of the rebellion ===
Zhang Chang continued his success by besieging Wancheng (宛城; in present-day Nanyang, Henan). He killed the general, Yang Yi (羊伊) and defeated another, Zhao Xiang (趙驤). He then laid siege on Xiangyang, but this time with no success. Later in the year, Zhang Chang’s general, Shi Bing, invaded Yangzhou, defeated its Inspector, Chen Hui (陳徽), and capture all the province's commanderies. Shi Bing and another general, Chen Zhen (陳貞), then invaded Jiangzhou and took the commanderies of Wuling, Lingling (零陵郡; around present-day Yongzhou, Hunan), Yuzhang (豫章郡; around present-day Nanchang, Jiangxi), Wuchang, and Changsha. A man from Linhuai Commadery named Feng Yun (封雲) also took up arms and invaded Xuzhou to support the rebels. The rebels' territory encompassed portions of Jingzhou, Jiangzhou, Xuzhou, Yangzhou and Yuzhou. Zhang Chang appointed his administrators and governors to run his domain, but the people he elected were cruel and plundered their territory.

=== Downfall and death ===
Zhang Chang's rebellion quickly lost its momentum upon reaching its greatest extent. Sima Xin's replacement, Liu Hong, sent a group of generals, including Tao Kan, to fight Zhang Chang at Jingling, while he sent another group with Li Yang (李楊) to take Jiangxia. Tao Kan's group defeated Zhang Chang multiple times and reportedly killed tens of thousands of his followers. After a devastating rout, Zhang Chang fled to Mount Xiajun (下儁山; in present-day Changsha, Hunan) as the rest of his soldiers surrendered to Jin.

Zhang Chang hid while his rebellion disintegrated. By early 304, nearly all the commanderies in his domain had realigned with Jin, and the remaining resistance had either died or surrendered. In the autumn of 304, Jin soldiers in Jingzhou captured Zhang Chang and beheaded him, officially ending the rebellion. They then sent his head to the capital.
