= Gu Rong =

Chinese Jin dynasty official (died Jan 313)

- 顧榮

Military Judge under the General Who Stabilises the East (安東將軍軍司)
- In office 307 – 313
- Monarch: Emperor Min of Jin

Personal details
- Born: Unknown (Note: Gu Rong's biography in Book of Jin recorded that he began his service under Eastern Wu before the age of 20 ("ruoguan"); this was before Eastern Wu fell to Jin in 280. Thus, Gu Rong's birth year should be before 260.) Suzhou, Jiangsu
- Died: 30 January 313 (Note: Vol.88 of Zizhi Tongjian recorded that Gu Rong died in the 6th year of the Yong'jia era of the reign of Emperor Huai of Jin. Dai Yang's biography in Book of Jin recorded that he correctly predicted (in the 6th year of the Yongjia era) that Gu would die before the Laba Festival of that year; the record went on to indicate that Gu did die on the 17th day of the 12th month, two days before the festival (At the time, the festival's date had not yet been fixed as the 8th day of the 12th month). The 17th day of the 12th month of the 6th year of the Yong'jia era corresponds to 30 Jan 313 in the Julian calendar. Dai Yang also correctly predicted the demise of Zhou Chu's son Zhou Qi, who died about seven months after Gu.)
- Relations: Gu Yong (grandfather)
- Children: Gu Pi
- Parent: Gu Mu (father)
- Courtesy name: Yanxian (彥先)
- Peerage: Earl of Xixing (喜興伯)
- Posthumous name: Duke Yuan (元公)

Gu Rong (Note: He should not be confused with his clansman with a similar-sounding name (顧容), who was Inspector of Jingzhou under Eastern Wu, and took part in the Jiao Province Campaign.) (died 30 January 313), courtesy name Yanxian, was an official of the Jin dynasty (266–420). A grandson of the Eastern Wu chancellor, Gu Yong, he became a famous celebrity during his time in the Jin capital, Luoyang and served under a succession of princes in the War of the Eight Princes. Due to the turmoil in northern China, Gu Rong returned to his hometown in the Jiangnan, where, despite initially joining, he played a decisive role in quelling Chen Min's rebellion in 307. In his final years, he served the Prince of Langya and future founding emperor of the Eastern Jin, Sima Rui, helping him lay the foundations for the dynasty in the south. Along with Ji Zhan, He Xun, Yang Fang and Xue Jian, Gu Rong was referred to as one of the "Five Eminence" (五俊).

== Life ==
=== Early life and career ===
Gu Rong was a member of the Gu clan of Wu Commandery as the grandson of the famous Eastern Wu chancellor, Gu Yong. His father was Gu Mu (顧穆), (Note: The Wu Lu recorded that Gu Mu was also known as "Gu Yu" (顧裕).) who was the administrator of Yidu Commandery under Wu. Gu Rong also served the Eastern Wu at a young age, and was appointed as a Gentleman of the Yellow Gate and Commandant Who Upholds Righteousness to the Crown Prince. After Wu was conquered by the Western Jin dynasty, he moved to the capital along with the brothers, Lu Ji and Lu Yun, where the three became known as the "Three Eminence" (三俊). Gu Rong was appointed as a Palace Gentleman and served as a Gentleman of Writing, Internal Resident to the Crown Prince and Ministry of Justice Rectifier.

=== War of the Eight Princes ===
In c.September 300, the Prince of Zhao, Sima Lun killed the Prince of Huainan, Sima Yun, who attempted to ovethrow him. Yun's subordinates were sent before the court to be killed, but Gu Rong, who oversaw their trials, tried them impartially and pardoned many of them. In 301, after Sima Lun usurped the throne from Emperor Hui of Jin in February, Gu Rong was appointed as the Chief Clerk to the General-in-Chief and Sima Lun's son Sima Qian (司馬虔).

Not long after the usurpation, the Prince of Qi, Sima Jiong defeated Sima Lun and restored Emperor Hui to the throne. Gu Rong served as a registrar under Jiong, but seeing that the prince was acting like a tyrant in his administration, he became so worried that he would be implicated if Jiong fell from power that he even considered committing suicide. Gu Rong spent his days drinking and ignoring his official duties before telling his friend, Feng Xiong (馮熊) about the matter. Feng Xiong therefore persuaded Jiong's chief clerk, Ge Yu (葛旟) to transfer Gu Rong to the office of Palace Secretarial Attendant. Following his transfer, Gu Rong stopped drinking, but people began to question his change in behaviour, forcing him to drink again in order to quell their suspicions.

In January 303, the Prince of Changsha, Sima Ai killed Sima Jiong after a battle in Luoyang. Gu Rong sided with Ai and defeated Ge Yu, so he was conferred the title of Earl of Xixing and transferred to the office of Internal Companion of the Crown Prince. After Sima Ai became General of Elite Cavalry, Gu Rong was appointed to serve as his Chief Clerk.

In 304, after Sima Ai was burnt to death by Zhang Fang in March and the Prince of Chengdu, Sima Ying became prime minister, Gu Rong became his Assistant Officer of the Household and moved to his base in Ye. Later that year, the Prince of Donghai, Sima Yue led a campaign against Ying from Luoyang, but failed, and Emperor Hui was relocated to Ye. Gu Rong was then appointed Palace Attendant and was ordered to pay tribute at homage at the imperial mausoleum in Luoyang. However, along the way, Luoyang was occupied by Zhang Fang, a general of the Prince of Hejian, Sima Yong, and Gu Rong was unable to proceed, so he fled to Chenliu. At the end of 304, Emperor Hui was forced to move to Chang'an by Zhang Fang. Gu Rong was summoned to serve as a Regular Mounted Attendant. However, Gu Rong, no longer wanting to serve through the chaos within the court, declined and returned to his hometown in Jiangnan. While Sima Yue was gathering his troops at Xu province to campaign against Sima Yong, he made Gu Rong an Army-Libationer Consultant.

=== Chen Min's rebellion ===
In 305, the chancellor of Guangling, Chen Min rebelled in Liyang while Sima Yue and Sima Yong were preoccupied with their civil war. He crossed south of the Yangzi and expelled the Inspector of Yang province, Liu Ji (劉機) and others, thus claiming the Jiangnan region for himself. Gu Rong and many of the local gentry clans initially recognized his rule, and he served as General of the Right and Interior Minister of Danyang under Chen Min. When Chen Min planned on killing the scholar-officials of Jiangnan who he thought were not supporting him, Gu Rong intervened and persuaded him against the decision.

In 307, two years since Chen Min took over the Jiangnan, the interior minister of Lujiang, Hua Tan sent out letters to the southern gentry admonishing them for submitting to Chen Min. By then, Sima Yue had already won the civil war, and Gu Rong felt shame upon reading the letter. Thus, Gu Rong and other Jin loyalists began plotting to overthrow Chen Min. They secretly informed the Jin general, Liu Zhun (劉準) in Shouchun regarding their plot and asked him to send his soldiers south of the Yangzi while they acted from within. The conspirators pledged their allegiance by cutting their hair, a taboo in Confucian filial piety, as Liu Zhun ordered Liu Ji (劉機), Heng Yan (衡彥) and others to campaign against Chen Min.

Chen Min sent his brother, Chen Chang (陳昶) to attack the Jin army, but one of the conspirators, Zhou Qi was able to kill him after convincing his subordinate, Qian Guang (錢廣) to assassinate him and rebel. Chen Min then ordered his Inspector of Yang province, Gan Zhuo to repel Qian Guang at the Zhuque Bridge (朱雀橋; located on the Qinhuai River near Nanjing). Gu Rong was worried that Chen Min was beginning to suspect him, so he requested to remain close by him. However, Chen Min thought that Gu Rong should head out and fight instead. Reassured, Gu Rong and Zhou Qi went out and met with Gan Zhuo, persuading him to defect. Gu Rong, Gan Zhuo, Zhou Qi and others led their forces to attack Chen Min at Jianye. Chen Min had more than 10,000 troops under his command, but a soldier from Gan Zhuo's army shouted at them, "It was Lord Gu [Rong] of Danyang and Lord Zhou [Qi] of Anfeng who supported Lord Chen [Min] from the start; yet here they are standing against him. What will you all do?" Chen Min's soldiers became unsure on what to do, and when Gu Rong waved a white fan ordering them to disperse, they all willingly scattered and fled. Chen Min was soon captured and executed, thus putting an end to his rebellion.

Sima Yue summoned Gu Rong to serve as a Palace Attendant. Gu Rong travelled with Ji Zhan and other scholars from the south, but when they arrived at Xu province, they heard about that the north was becoming increasingly chaotic and hesitated to proceed. Yue wrote a letter to the Inspector of Xu, Pei Dun (裴盾 (Note: brother of Sima Yue's wife Princess Pei)), stating that if they delayed any further, they will be escorted by the military. Gu Rong and his contemporaries were so frightened that they unloaded their boats and abandoned their carts to flee back to their hometowns.

=== Assisting Sima Rui and death ===
After Chen Min's defeat in 307, the Prince of Langya, Sima Rui, was assigned to Jianye to guard the Jiangnan. To win the support of the southern gentry clans, Sima Rui appointed him Gu Rong as a Military Judge under him and a Regular Mounted Attendant. Gu Rong held a high position and was always consulted by the prince in all his plans, so he was well-respected both in court and in public. Believing that the talents of the southland was not being fully utilized, Gu Rong recommended several officials to Sima Rui to include in his administration, such as Lu Ye (grandson of Lu Mao), Gan Zhuo, Gu Qian (顧謙; son of Gu Ti), He Xun, Yin You (殷祐; son of Yin Li), Yang Yanming (楊彥明) and Xie Xingyan (謝行言), all of who Rui accepted.

Gu Rong died while still in office in January 313. Sima Rui was saddened by his death and personally attended his funeral. Rui submitted a petition to the imperial court asking that they honour Gu Rong in accordance with meritorious standards of Sima Jiong. Yin You wrote that Gu Rong's merits were extraordinary, but he was rewarded like a mere subordinate, and that no reward would be able to match his achievements. Sima Rui posthumously awarded him the offices of Palace Attendant, Regular Mounted Attendant and Executor and Assistant Minister of the Three Offices. Gu Rong was also given the posthumous name of "Yuan" (元), and when Sima Rui became the King of Jin in 317, he was further given the title of duke. He was succeeded by his son, Gu Pi (顧毗), who was promoted to Regular Mounted Attendant.
