= Tao Kan =

Jin Dynasty general (259–334)

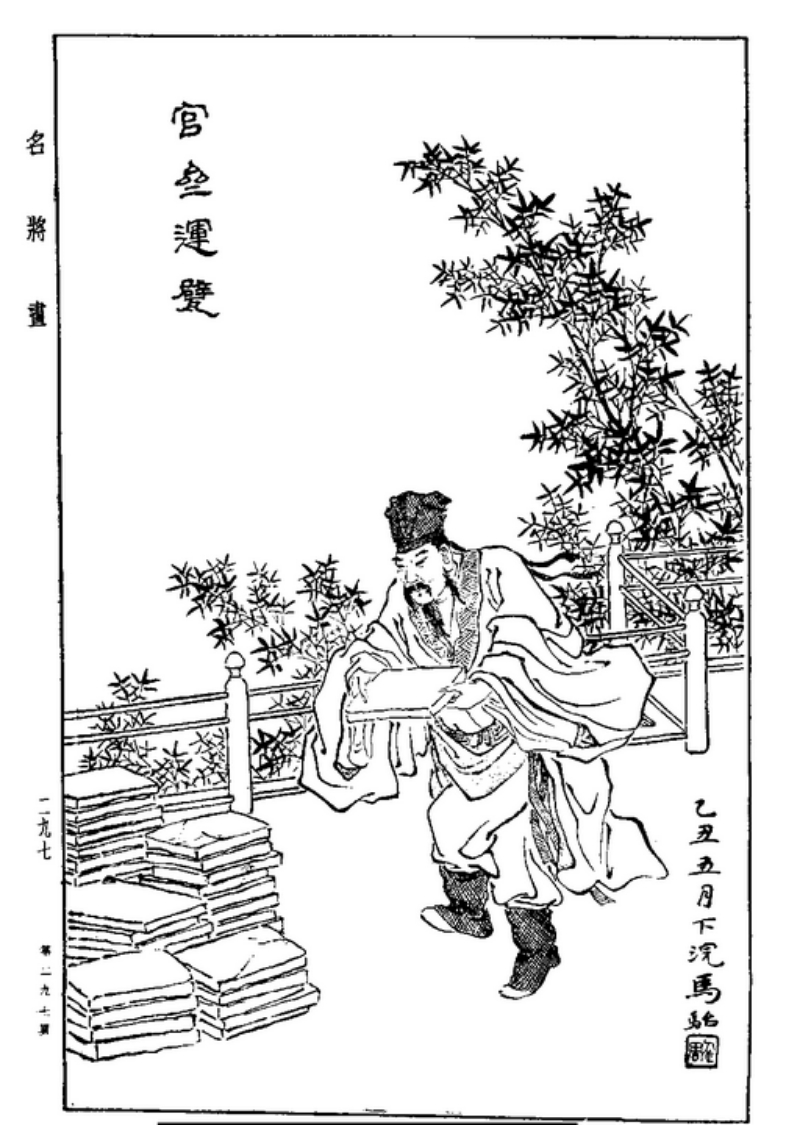
Tao Kan

Tao Kan (Chinese: 陶侃; pinyin: Táo Kǎn) (259 (Note: Tao Kan's biography in Book of Jin indicated that he was 76 (by East Asian reckoning) when he died. Thus by calculation, his birth year should be 259.) – 30 July 334 (Note: According to Emperor Cheng's biography in Book of Jin, Tao Kan died on the yimao day of the 6th month of the 9th year of the Xian'he era of his reign. This corresponds to 30 Jul 334 on the Julian calendar. Vol.95 of Zizhi Tongjian recorded the same death date.)), courtesy name Shixing (士行), formally Duke Huan of Changsha (長沙桓公), was a Chinese military general and politician during the Jin dynasty. He was the great-grandfather of the Jin Dynasty poet Tao Yuanming.

== Early career ==
Tao Kan was born under the rule of Eastern Wu, and his father Tao Dan (陶丹) was an Eastern Wu general. Early in his career, he was a low-level county official. Subsequently, Tao was nominated a xiaolian by the commandery governor Zhang Kui (張夔), and sent to the Jin prime minister Zhang Hua for commission. Initially, Zhang Hua, who did not favor people from former Eastern Wu lands, did not grant him an audience. After repeated visits, Tao managed to meet Zhang, and impressed the latter with his words. Zhang then gave Tao a post of langzhong. Tao later served on the staff of the general Sun Xiu (孫秀), (Note: not to be confused with the Eastern Wu emperor or Sima Lun's advisor. This Sun Xiu was a member of the Eastern Wu imperial household, being the grandson of Sun Kuang.) and managed to meet Gu Rong, who was also impressed by Tao.

Eventually, Tao served on the staff of the famed Jing Province (荊州, modern Hubei and Hunan) governor Liu Hong. After defeating Zhang Chang's rebellion, Liu once personally told him, "When I was serving on Lord Yang's (referring to Yang Hu) staff, he told me that I would one day have his position. Now, I tell you that you will one day have my position." Tao later played a large role in Liu's suppression of the rebel Chen Min; while Tao was from the same commandery as Chen and became an official in the same year as Chen, Liu Hong trusted Tao to carry out his duties. He later served successively as several commanderies' governor, and later served under the general Wang Dun, participating in Wang's campaign against various agrarian rebels, including the powerful Du Tao. For his accomplishments, Wang commissioned Tao as the governor of Jing Province, fulfilling Liu's prior words.

However, Wang soon became apprehensive about Tao's abilities. In 315, he suddenly detained Tao and ordered him to be the governor of Guang Province (廣州, modern Guangdong) -- considered to be a demotion and an exile. He even considered executing Tao, but fearful that killing Tao would lead to reactions from the general Zhou Fang, whose daughter was Tao's daughter-in-law, (Note: Zhou Fang's son-in-law Tao Zhan predeceased his father; he was killed when Jiankang fell to Su Jun during the latter's rebellion.) he allowed Tao to report to Guang Province, which had been in control of the semi-rebel Wang Ji. (Note: Wang Ji has a biography in vol.100 of Jin Shu.) (Note: Wang Liang's (王谅) biography in Book of Jin recorded that Wang Ji was the Inspector of Jiaozhou sent by Wang Dun to replace Tao Xian (陶咸); Tao Xian had been invited to serve as Inspector after Liang Shuo (梁硕) dominated the region after killing Gu Shou, grandson of Gu Ti. Refusing Wang Ji's appointment, Liang invited Xiu Ze's (修则) son Xiu Zhan (修湛) to assist him in resisting Wang Ji. "Tao Xian" was likely referring to Tao Wei (陶威), son of Tao Huang. The Zizhi Tongjian recorded that Wang Ji had already declared himself inspector in Guangzhou when Du Hong (杜弘), a subordinate of Du Tao, surrendered to him. Wang Dun then decided to use Wang Ji and Du Hong to attack Liang Shuo. Liang, with assistance from Xiu Zhan, repelled Wang Ji, who then returned to Guangzhou together with Du, Wen Shao (温卲) and Liu Shen (刘沈).) Upon arrival in Guang Province, Tao defeated Wang easily and pacified the province. (Note: Vol.92 of Zizhi Tongjian recorded that Liang Shuo remained subservient until c.late 322, where Wang Dun's Inspector of Jiaozhou Wang Liang (王谅) tried to kill him. Liang then severely wounded Wang Liang (who later died of his injuries), and rebelled; he was eventually killed by Tao Kan's subordinate Gao Bao (高宝).) As the provincial affairs did not require him to work all day, Tao, by then in his 50s, developed the exercise habit of moving a hundred bricks a day from his study to his courtyard, and then from the courtyard back to the study, reasoning that he needed to continue to exercise himself for future campaigns to recover central China. He was therefore often cited in Chinese history as an example of the importance of physical exercise.

== Later career ==
When Wang Dun rebelled against Emperor Yuan in 322, Emperor Yuan commissioned Tao to be the governor of Jiang Province (江州, modern Jiangxi) with intent that Tao participate in attacking Wang's rear. However, Tao sent only a small force to assist Sima Cheng (司馬承) the governor of Xiang Province (湘州, modern Hunan), who was loyal to Emperor Yuan, and Tao's force was insufficient to prevent Sima Cheng from being defeated and killed by Wang. After Wang was successful in capturing the capital Jiankang and forcing Emperor Yuan to submit to his will, he kept Tao at Guang Province. Subsequently, after Wang died during his campaign to overthrow Emperor Ming in 324, Emperor Ming made Tao the governor of Jing Province and military commander of the western provinces; he was effective in that role. (Note: The military improvements Tao made later helped to pave the way for Huan Wen's later campaign to conquer Cheng-Han in 347.)

However, Tao became resentful when Emperor Ming died in 325 and failed to list him among the officials who were promoted or honored—leading him to suspect that Emperor Ming's brother-in-law, the regent Yu Liang, had erased his name. (Note: Another factor could be Tao's seniority; he was about 30 years older than Yu.) As a result, Yu became apprehensive of Tao, and subsequently, when Su Jun rebelled in 327 and attacked Jiankang, he ordered Wen Jiao the governor of Jiang Province not to come to Jiankang's aid but instead defend against a possible Tao attack, and this contributed to Jiankang's fall to Su in 328.

After Jiankang fell, Yu fled to Wen's domain, and they considered how they could defeat Su. Wen's cousin Wen Chong (溫充) suggested that they offer the title of the supreme commander to Tao, and they did so. However, Tao was still resentful of Yu and therefore initially refused. Eventually, however, after his anger was over, he accepted, and he, Wen, and Yu combined their forces and headed east to Jiankang. In winter 328, during a battle with Su, Su was killed, and they subsequently defeated the remnants of Su's army in 329. For his contributions, Tao was created the Duke of Changsha. When he later suppressed the rebellion of Guo Mo in 330, he was given the military command over eight provinces—an extreme authority not even matched by Wang Dun. As he grew ill in 334, he resigned and tried to retire to his dukedom of Changsha, but died on the way.
