= Dai Yuan (Jin dynasty) =

Jin dynasty official (271–322)

- 戴淵

Inspector of Si province (司州刺史)
- In office 321 – 322
- Monarch: Emperor Yuan of Jin

Personal details
- Born: 271 (Note: Vol.05 of Jiankang Shilu recorded that Dai was 52 (by East Asian reckoning) when he died.) Yangzhou, Jiangsu
- Died: 322 Nanjing, Jiangsu
- Parent: Dai Chang (father)
- Courtesy name: Ruosi (若思)
- Peerage: Marquis of Moling (秣陵侯)
- Posthumous name: Jian (簡)

Dai Yuan (271 – 25 April 322), (Note: The Zizhi Tongjian recorded that Zhou Yi and Dai Yuan were both executed on the bingzi day of the 3rd month of the 1st year of the Yongchang era. The annals of Emperor Yuan in Book of Jin recorded the month as the 4th month, which is an error.) courtesy name Ruosi, posthumously known as Marquis Jian of Moling (秣陵簡侯), was a military general of the Jin dynasty (266–420). As a general of Emperor Yuan of Jin, Dai Yuan became one of the emperor's key allies in his plan to counter the influence of the Wang clan of Langya. He was assigned to guard the northern frontier at Hefei, but when Wang Dun launched his rebellion against the emperor soon after, he was hastily recalled to Jiankang and was defeated. Afterwards, he and his peer Zhou Yi refused to acknowledge Wang Dun's authority and were sentenced to death. Due to Tang dynasty naming taboo, he is referred to by his courtesy name as Dai Ruosi (戴若思) in the Book of Jin. (Note: Dai Yuan (戴淵) shares the same given name as Emperor Gaozu of Tang, whose real name is Li Yuan (李淵).)

== Early life and career ==
Dai Yuan was a native of Guangling Commandery. He was described in the Book of Jin as refined and possessing a carefree and cheerful personality. In his youth, he lacked moral restraint, wandering as a youxia who often robbed merchants along the Yangtze and Huai rivers before he met the minister, Lu Ji.

A story in A New Account of the Tales of the World recorded that Dai Yuan and his men first spotted Lu Ji on his ship, who was returning to Luoyang from his vaction with a large baggage train. While sitting on his folding chair along the shore, Dai gave out precise and clear commands to his men to rob the ship. Lu was impressed by his display, so he climbed the roof of his boat and shouted, "With such talent and ability, why do you waste yourself with robbery?" Dai Yuan was moved to tears by his words, so he threw his sword and decided to join Lu Ji's staff.

Dai Yuan was nominated as a Xiaolian, and when they reached Luoyang in c.300, Lu recommended him to the Prince of Zhao, Sima Lun. (Note: Dai's biography in Book of Jin recorded that he was 30 (by East Asian reckoning) at this point. It is unknown if Sima Lun was already regent of Emperor Hui of Jin at this point, or the regency was still in the hands of Jia Nanfeng.) The prince wanted to appoint him as the Magistrate of Qinshui County, but Dai did not accept his office. He instead returned south to Wuling to visit his father, Dai Chang (戴昌), who then recommended him to see his fellow Guangling native, Pan Jing (潘京), who was talented in identifying talents. After a short conversation, Pan Jing commended him for possessing the abilities of an official.

Dai Yuan eventually rose to the position of Army Advisor for the Prince of Donghai, Sima Yue. He was then sent out of Luoyang to serve as Administrator of Yuzhang, and was given the additional office General Who Inspires Might while concurrently serving as Chief Controller of the Righteous Army. As he gained merit for suppressing the local bandits, he was bestowed the title of Marquis of Moling and promoted to Secretarial Censor and Marshal to the General of Agile Cavalry. He then served as a Regular Mounted Attendant.

== Service under Emperor Yuan ==
In 307, the Prince of Langya, Sima Rui (the future Emperor Yuan of Jin) was assigned to Jianye as General Who Guards the East. Around this time, Dai Yuan was recruited by the prince to serve as his Marshal of the Right. In 315, Dai Yuan was appointed General of the Vanguard to campaign against the rebel, Du Tao, but before he could set out, the other Jin generals had already quelled the uprising. In 317, when Sima Rui elevated himself to Prince of Jin, Dai Yuan was transferred to Master of Writing. After Sima Rui took the throne the following year, Dai Yuan declined a series of promotions and transfers for himself.

In 321, Emperor Yuan, following the advice of his aide, Liu Wei to suppress the growing power of the commander, Wang Dun and his clan, appointed Dai Yuan as General Who Attacks the West, Chief Controller of military affairs in the Six Provinces of Si, Yan, Yu, Ji, Yong and Bing and Inspector of Si province with authority to act on behalf of the emperor and the official, Wang Xia as his military judge. More than a 1,000 official applicant were assigned to his military staff, and more than 10,000 household slaves in Yang province were conscripted as his soldiers. Dai Yuan was transferred to Hefei, and before he left, Emperor Yuan visited his camp to raise his soldier's spirit and host a farewell banquet.

At the time, the Inspector of Yu province, Zu Ti was in the middle of his expedition to reclaim lost territory in northern China from the Later Zhao dynasty. The appointment of Dai Yuan as Chief Controller over Yu meant that Zu Ti was now his subordinate and had to stop his expedition. Zu lamented that while Dai was talented and respected, he did not have the necessary foresight to even lead the northern expedition. Zu Ti soon withdrew and died in disappointment.

== Wang Dun's first rebellion and death ==
Just as Dai Yuan arrived at Hefei in 322, Wang Dun began his rebellion against Emperor Yuan with the pretext of removing Liu Wei for his alleged corruption. The imperial court issued an urgent edict recalling Dai Yuan back to the capital and promoting him to General of Agile Cavalry. Dai Yuan and the general, Guo Yi (郭逸) set camp at the intersection north of the Daheng Bridge (大桁橋). When Shitou soon fell to Wang Dun's forces, Sima Rui ordered Dai Yuan and the others to attack the city. However, the imperial forces suffered a grave defeat, and Emperor Yuan was forced to submit to Wang Dun.

Emperor Yuan ordered his officials, including Dai Yuan and Zhou Yi, to pay their respects to Wang Dun at Shitou. When he turned to Dai Yuan, he asked "Do you still have any energy left from our battle the other day?" Dai defiantly replied, "How can I dare say that I still do? My only regret was that I did not have enough." Wang then asked, "What does the world think of me now that I have raised the banners?" Dai sarcastically responded, "Those who see the obvious call it treason, those who know substance call it loyalty," much to the amusement of Wang.

Wang Dun had an Army Advisor named Lü Yi (吕猗) who used to work as a Master of Writing alongside Dai Yuan. He was a talented writer but also notorious for his use of flattery, which became a source of animosity between him and Dai. Therefore, Lü warned Wang Dun that Dai Yuan and Zhou Yi were both influential enough to rally the people against them, and given their recent comments, he should do away with them at once. Wang Dun, who already hated the two men, agreed, so he sent Deng Yue and Miao Tan (繆坦) to arrest and execute the two.

Dai Yuan had a good reputation at the time, and many people in Jin were saddened by his death. After Wang Dun's defeat in 324, he was posthumously appointed as Right Household Counsellor and Yitong Sansi, and given the posthumous name of "Jian".
