= Linhuai Commandery =

Historic commandery of China

Linhuai Commandery (Chinese: 臨淮郡) was a historical commandery of China, located in what is now central Jiangsu province.

== History ==
The Shuowen Jiezi records the commandery as the area of the former state of Han.

The commandery was first established in 117 BC, from part of Pei and Guangling commanderies. In late Western Han period, the commandery administered 29 counties and marquessates: Xu (徐), Qulü (取慮), Huaipu (淮浦), Xuyi (盱眙), Rouyou (厹猶), Tong (僮), Sheyang (射陽), Kaiyang (開陽), Zhuiqi (贅其), Gaoshan (高山), Suiling (睢陵), Yandu (鹽瀆), Huaiyin (淮陰), Huailing (淮陵), Xiaxiang (下相), Fuling (富陵), Dongyang (東陽), Bojing (播旌), Xiping (西平), Gaoping (高平), Kailing (開陵), Changyang (昌陽), Guangping (廣平), Lanyang (蘭陽), Xiangping (襄平), Hailing (海陵), Yu (輿), Tangyi (堂邑) and Leling (樂陵). Total population in 2 AD was 1,237,764 individuals or 268,283 households. In early Eastern Han, Linhuai was briefly granted to Liu Heng (劉衡), son of the Emperor Guangwu, as his fief. At Heng's death, Linhuai reverted to the status of a commandery. In 75, Linhuai was merged into the Xiapi Kingdom, then ruled by Liu Yan (劉衍), son of the Emperor Ming.

Linhuai Commandery was reestablished at the time of Jin dynasty's founding. The commandery then only had 10 counties: Xuyi, Dongyang, Zhuiqi, Gaoshan, Panjing (潘旌, formerly Bojing), Gaoyou, Huailing, Siwu (司吾), Xiaxiang and Xu. In 280, the population was 10,000 households. The region was lost during the Yongjia period. When recovered by the Jin in 411, it was renamed Xuyi Commandery.

During the Tang dynasty, Linhuai Commandery became an alternative name of Si Prefecture. In 741, the commandery consisted of four counties: Linhuai, Lianshui, Xuyi and Xucheng (徐城). The population was 205,959 individuals or 37,526 households.
