= Jiangzhou Prefecture =

Former administrative division of China

Jiangzhou or Jiang Prefecture (江州) was a zhou (prefecture) in imperial China centering on modern Jiujiang, China. In the Yuan dynasty it was known as Jiangzhou Prefecture (江州路).
