= Hua Yi =

Jin dynasty official (died 311)

- 華軼

Inspector of Jiang province (江州刺史)
- In office ? – 311
- Monarch: Emperor Huai of Jin

Personal details
- Born: Unknown Yucheng, Shandong
- Died: 311
- Relations: Hua Xin (great-grandfather)
- Children: Seven unnamed children
- Parent: Hua Tan (father)
- Courtesy name: Yanxia (彥夏)

Hua Yi (Note: Not to be confused with his uncle with a similar-sounding name (華廙), who married a granddaughter of Lu Zhi.) (died late July 311), courtesy name Yanxia, was an official of the Jin dynasty (266–420). He was the Inspector of Jiang province and an early adversary to the Prince of Langya and future Emperor Yuan of Jin, Sima Rui. Maintaining his loyalty to the imperial court in Luoyang, Hua Yi refused to take any orders from Sima Rui, prompting the prince to send an army to defeat and kill him in 311.

== Life ==
=== Early career ===
Hua Yi was a member of the Hua clan of Pingyuan Commandery. His great-grandfather, Hua Xin, was a high-ranking minister under the Cao Wei dynasty, while his grandfather, Hua Biao, was a Palace Counsellor and his father, Hua Tan (華澹) was the Intendant of Henan. He was famous for his talents from his young age, and praised for his generosity and magnanimity. He was first appointed as an Academician before being promoted to a Regular Mounted Attendant.

When the Prince of Donghai, Sima Yue became Governor of Yan province in 308, Hua Tan was invited to serve as a Chief Clerk of the Detached Staff. Afterwards, he was appointed as the General Who Inspires Might and Inspector of Jiang province. When the War of the Eight Princes (291–307) was happening, Hua Yi remained strongly adherent to Confucianist ritual etiquette and manners. He proposed the creation of the Scholar Libationer office to further promote Confucianism.

=== Administration of Jiang province ===
In Jiang province, Hua Yi governed the region with benevolence and prestige and was on friendly terms with the local nobility. Thus, many exiles displaced by the ongoing chaos in the empire flocked to join him. When Sima Yue requested him for reinforcements to fight against bandits, Hua Yi sent Tao Kan as the General Who Spreads Martial Might to station at Xiakou (夏口; present-day Hankou, Hubei) with 3,000 soldiers to act as reinforcements.

While Jin authority in the north was collapsing day by day, Hua Yi remained loyal to the imperial court and diligently sent tribute to the capital, Luoyang every year as proof of his vassalhood. If the roads to Luoyang were blocked, he delivered the tribute to the Prince of Langya, Sima Rui at Jianye instead, acting on behalf of the Sima clan. Although he was expected to answer to whoever controlled Shouchun, Hua Yi retained a keen sense of loyalty to Luoyang, as he had previously been appointed through their envoy, and refused to take orders from Sima Rui. Many people from his counties and commanderies tried to dissuade him, but Hua Yi refused to listen and only replied, "I only want to see the imperial edict."

Likewise, Sima Rui was suspicious of Hua Yi and sent his general, Zhou Fang to camp at Pengze with 1,200 soldiers in anticipation of his attack. However, Zhou Fang respected Hua Yi's efforts in helping the people of his province, so he only moved to Eling County (鄂陵; in present-day Caishan, Hubei) in Xunyang (尋陽; southwest of present-day Huangmei County, Hubei) to prevent further military escalation.

=== Death ===
After Luoyang fell in the Disaster of Yongjia on 14 July 311, the Jin provisional government under Xun Fan issued a call to arms and appointed Sima Rui to lead their alliance. Rui exercised his new imperial authority by changing around the chief officials, but Hua Yi, along with the Inspector of Yu province, Pei Xian (裴宪; son of Pei Kai), still refused to obey. The prince thus ordered his general, Wang Dun to lead Gan Zhuo, Zhou Fang, Song Dian (宋典), Zhao You and others to attack him. Hua Yi sent his Attendant Officer, Chen Xiong (陳雄) to defend Pengze while he organized a navy to provide support. The administrator of Wuchang, Feng Yi (馮逸), sided with Hua Yi and garrisoned himself at Penkou (湓口, in modern Jiujiang, Jiangxi), but was defeated by Zhou Fang.

Wei Zhan (衞展), the former Inspector of Jiang province, hated Hua Yi as he was not respected by him. Hearing of Hua Yi's situation, Wei Zhan colluded with the administrator of Yuzhang, Zhou Guang (周廣), and the two secretly raised troops to attack Hua Yi from behind. The Jin forces defeated Hua Yi, forcing him to flee to Ancheng (安成, in modern Ji'an, Jiangxi). Zhou Fang pursued him there and had him executed alongside his five sons. His head was then sent to Jianye while Pei Xian fled to You province.

Before his death, a native of Guangling, Gao Kui (高悝) was staying in Jiang province, where Hua Yi invited him to serve as an Assistant Officer in the West Bureau and showed him preferential treatment. After he was killed, Gao Kui secretly hid Hua Yi's wife and two of his kids for many years. Once some time had passed and a general amnesty was granted, only then did Gao Kui brought them before the court. Sima Rui praised them and decided to have them all pardoned.
