= Wang Ru =

Chinese Jin dynasty rebel and official (died 315)

- 王如

Grand General (self-appointed) (大將軍)
- In office 310 – 312
- Monarch: Liu Cong

Personal details
- Born: Unknown Xi'an, Shaanxi
- Died: 315
- Relations: Wang Li (brother)

Wang Ru (died 315) (Note: The Zizhi Tongjian recorded that he died in this year (3rd year of the Jianxing era of the reign of Emperor Min of Jin); the record of his death was after the record for Du Tao's death.) was a military general and rebel of the Jin dynasty (266–420) and the Han-Zhao dynasty during the Sixteen Kingdoms period. Fleeing from the upheaval in northern China, he led a group of refugees to rebel in the Nanyang Basin in 310. Wang Ru and his allies clashed with the Han-Zhao general, Shi Le before surrendering to the Jin commander, Wang Dun in 312. Later, he was executed after he was incited by Wang Dun to assassinate his superior, Wang Leng (王稜). (Note: The character "稜" has two pronunciations: "lēng" and "líng". The Zizhi Tongjian recorded his name as "棱".)

== Life ==
=== Early life and rebellion ===
Wang Ru was a native of Xinfeng County (新豐; south of present-day Weinan, Shaanxi), Jingzhao Commandery and initially served as a military official in Yong province under the Western Jin dynasty. As northern China fell into unrest, he and numerous refugees moved to Wancheng to avoid the chaos.

In 310, the imperial court issued an edict ordering all refugees to return to their hometown. However, Wang Ru and his fellow refugees refused, as the Guanzhong region was still devasted by war and famine. The General Who Attacks the South, Shan Jian and the Household General of the South, Du Rui (杜蕤) sent their soldiers to ensure that the refugees leave at the appropriate time, but Wang Ru secretly formed a pact with a group of ruffians and launched a night raid on the Jin armies, defeating them.

Soon, Du Rui brought his whole force to attack Wang Ru, but Wang met them at Nieyang (涅陽; in present-day Nanyang, Henan) and decisively defeated them. Shan Jian, believing the situation to beyond his control, withdrew to Xiakou (夏口; in present-day Wuhan, Hubei). Wang Ru advanced to captured Xiangcheng, where he was joined by the likes of Pang Shi (龐實), Yan Yi (嚴嶷) and Hou Tuo (侯脫). Together, they raided the various towns and killed the local magistrates and officials. Wang's forces eventually grew to 40,000 or 50,000 strong, and he proclaimed himself Grand General and acting Governor of Si and Yong provinces. He also attached himself to the rebel Han-Zhao dynasty in the north and camped himself at Rang county (穰縣; present-day Dengzhou, Henan).

Later in the year, the Jin capital at Luoyang, threatened by famine and the encroachment of Han forces, issued an urgent call for reinforcements. Shan Jian attempted to relieve them by sending his general Wang Wan (王萬), but they were once again defeated by Wang Ru at Nieyang. Wang Ru began to plunder the region between the Han and Mian rivers before advancing towards Shan's base at Xiangyang. Shan Jian sent Zhao Tong (趙同) to repel him, but he too found no success. With his morale sapped, Zhao Tong returned to Xiangyang to fortify the city. The Inspector of Jing province, Wang Cheng led his army from Jiangling to rescue Shan Jian, but Wang Ru fought back and drove them away.

=== Shi Le's invasion of Nanyang ===
Despite his vassalage, the Han general, Shi Le led his forces to invade the Nanyang Basin with the intention of establishing himself in the south. Wang and his allies were alarmed and dispatched 10,000 troops to reinforce Xiangcheng, but they were all defeated and captured by Shi Le. After Shi reached Nanyang and set camp in the mountains north of Wancheng, Wang Ru secretly sent him rare gifts and offered to swear a brotherly oath. Shi Le agreed to the proposal, seeing as Wang was still powerful in the region at the time.

Shi Le had long resented Hou Tuo, who was garrisoned at Wancheng and refused to submit to him. He dared not attack Wancheng, as he feared that Hou and Wang Ru would carry out a joint assault. However, Wang was also not on good terms with Hou, and after swearing their oath, he secretly warned Shi Le to prepare himself in anticipation of Hou's attack. Shi Le was delighted to learn about their animosity, so at night, he ordered his three armies to stand ready for sunrise to march against Wancheng. By morning, Shi Le's men had blocked the gates of Wancheng and laid siege to Hou Tuo for twelve days. Yan Yi attempted to relieve Hou Tuo, but was defeated and captured. In the end, Hou Tuo went out to surrender. Shi Le had him executed and sent Yan Yi to the Han capital at Pingyang.

With Hou Tuo's defeat, both Shi Le and Wang Ru began to turn on one another. Shi Le initially led 30,000 of his elite troops with the intention of attacking Wang Ru, but seeing that Wang's men were in high spirits, he called off his plans and turned back north towards Xiangcheng. Meanwhile, Wang Ru gave his younger brother, Wang Li (王璃) 25,000 cavalry to launch a surprise attack on Shi Le under the guise of congratulating him. However, Shi saw through his deception, so he intercepted and annihilated Wang Li's forces.

=== Surrender to Wang Dun and death ===
Though Shi Le would temporarily cease his southward ambitions, Wang Ru's power declined, and by 312, (Note: In his Zizhi Tongjian Kaoyi, Sima Guang recorded that when Wang Ru surrendered to Wang Dun was not recorded; he dated Wang Ru's surrender to the 6th year of the Yongjia era of Emperor Huai's reign as there were records of remnants of Wang Ru's army attacking Hanzhong the following year.) his soldiers was suffering from a severe famine and began attacking each other over food. The Jin army took advantage to launch a punitive expedition, prompting many of Wang's troops to surrender. With no other choice, Wang Ru surrendered to the Jin commander, Wang Dun.

Wang Dun's cousin, Wang Leng admired Wang Ru's bravery and asked Wang Dun to give him over as a subordinate. Wang Dun initially refused, warning his cousin that Wang Ru was an unruly person, while Wang Leng was too temperamental to handle him. When Wang Leng insisted, Wang Dun gave in. Wang Leng made Wang Ru a close aide and treated him well, but Wang Ru often got into fights with Wang Dun's subordinates. To reprimand him, Wang Leng had him flogged, which deeply humiliated Wang Ru.

When Wang Dun began plotting to usurp the throne, Wang Leng repeatedly tried to dissuade, much to Wang Dun's annoyance. Learning of Wang Ru's resentment, Wang Dun secretly sent someone to incite Wang Ru to assassinate his cousin. In 315, Wang Ru attended a feast hosted by Wang Leng. As the mood began to die down, Wang Ru asked if he could perform a sword dance, which Wang Leng permitted. During his performance, Wang Ru slowly approached Wang Leng, and as his intentions became obvious, Wang Leng instructed him to stop and ordered his attendants to drag him out of the stage. However, before they could do so, Wang Ru charged forward and killed his superior. When news of this reached Wang Dun, he feigned shock and ordered the capture and execution of Wang Ru.
