= Zhou Fang =

Zhou Fang may refer to:

- Zhou Fang (Han dynasty) (周防), Eastern Han scholar
- Zhou Fang (Eastern Wu) (周魴), Eastern Wu general
- Zhou Fang (Jin dynasty) (周訪), c. 260–320, Jin dynasty general
- Zhou Fang (Tang dynasty) (周昉), Tang dynasty painter
