= Lingming =

Lingming or Leng Beng (Chinese: 令明) is a masculine given name. Notable people with the name include:

- Wang Ji (Jin dynasty) (c. 289 – 315), Chinese rebel leader, courtesy name Lingming
- Kwek Leng Beng (born 1941), Singaporean businessman
