= Du Zeng =

Jin dynasty general and rebel (died 319)

- 杜曾

Administrator of Jingling (竟陵太守) (self-appointed)
- In office 312 – 319
- Monarch: Emperor Huai/Emperor Min of Jin

Personal details
- Born: Unknown Xinye County, Nanyang Commandery
- Died: 319
- Occupation: Military general

Du Zeng (died 28 June 319) was a Chinese military general and rebel of the Jin dynasty (266–420). In 312, he joined his fellow general, Hu Kang (胡亢), in rebelling against Jin from Jingling Commandery (竟陵, roughly modern Jingmen, Hubei), but later killed him and assumed leadership of the rebellion. Du Zeng was a thorn in the side of Jin as he often defeated their forces and held out in Jing province for many years. Eventually, he was decisively defeated by the general, Zhou Fang in 317, before being captured and executed in 319.

== As subordinate of Sima Xin and Hu Kang ==
Du Zeng was from Xinye County in Nanyang Commandery and started his career under the Prince of Xinye, Sima Xin (司馬歆), son of Sima Jun, Prince Wu of Fufeng. Du Zeng was said to be a very strong man, being able to swim across a river while wearing armor. Under Sima Xin, he rose to the rank of Colonel of the Southern Man Tribes and was present when Sima Xin met his death at the hands of Zhang Chang in 303.

In c.February 312, in light of the Disaster of Yongjia back in July 311, Hu Kang, another general of Sima Xin, took the opportunity to gather men at Jingling Commandery and start a rebellion, declaring himself Duke of Chu. Du Zeng joined Hu Kang and became his provisional Administrator of Jingling. However, Hu Kang proved to be a paranoid leader and executed many of his generals. Du Zeng plotted to get rid of him, but feigned loyalty at first to gain his trust. In 313, Du Zeng supported Hu Kang's decision to campaign against the bandit Wang Chong (王沖). Du Zeng had artisans to tamper with Hu Kang's personal guards' weapons before secretly enticing Wang Chong to attack. Hu Kang sent out all his men against Wang Chong, leaving himself defenceless within the city. Du Zeng then assassinated him and declared himself General of the Household Gentlemen and acting Administrator of Jingling.

== Leading the rebellion ==
Shortly after seizing power, Du Zeng wanted to enter an alliance with the Administrator of Nan Commandery, Liu Wu (劉務). When Liu Wu refused to marry his daughter to Du Zeng, Du Zeng had him and his family killed. Later that year, Wang Gong (王貢), a subordinate of the Jin general, Tao Kan, forged an order seemingly from his superior appointing Du Zeng as Grand Commander of the Vanguard. Wang Gong then killed Wang Chong and received Du Zeng's surrender. However, Du Zeng refused to answer a summoning from Tao Kan, which caused Wang Gong to panic. Fearing punishment, Wang Gong joined with Du Zeng and greatly routed Tao Kan. Tao Kan barely escaped with his life and was briefly demoted to a commoner.

In 315, Emperor Min of Jin sent Diwu Yi (第五猗) to Jing province, so Du Zeng welcomed him and made diplomatic ties by marrying his nephew to Diwu's daughter. Together, they occupied the area around the Han River. The same year, Tao Kan had defeated the powerful rebel Du Tao, and he set his target to defeating Du Zeng as well. Tao Kan besieged Du Zeng at Shicheng despite warnings from his Marshal Lu Tian (魯恬). Du Zeng had many cavalry units, and after secretly opening the city gates, they quickly broke through Tao Kan's formation. Once reaching the other side, they attacked Tao Kan's army from behind, and hundreds of his soldiers died after throwing themselves into the river. Following the battle, Du Zeng's generals gathered at Shunyang (尋陽, in present-day Xunyang, Jiangxi) where they saluted Tao Kan before leaving.

Du Zeng then attacked Xun Song (荀崧) at Wancheng to follow up his recent victories. Although Xun Song was outnumbered, his 12-year-old daughter, Xun Guan, was able to break out of the city and fight through Du Zeng's soldiers with a few hundred men to request for reinforcements. When Jin reinforcements arrived, Du Zeng was forced to lift his siege. Afterwards, Du Zeng asked Xun Song for permission to clear bandits around Dan River. Tao Kan sent a letter to Xun Song warning him not to trust Du Zeng due to his untrustworthy nature. However, Xun Song had very little troops and needed Du Zeng's assistance, so he did not heed Tao Kan's warning. As predicted, Du Zeng attacked Jin in Xiangyang instead, but was unable to take the city before withdrawing.

Later in the year, Tao Kan was detained by his superior, Wang Dun and forcibly assigned to Guang province. Many generals and officials in Jing felt that Tao Kan had been unfairly treated, and they were also reluctant to serve under his replacement, Wang Yi, who was Wang Dun's cousin. The general, Zheng Pan (鄭攀), led 3,000 soldiers to join up with Du Zeng at Yunkou (溳口; southeast of present-day Xinzhou District, Hubei). The two attacked Wang Yi and forced him to flee to Jiang'an. They then moved north join with Diwu Yi and defended their territory. Wang Yi sent several armies to campaign against the rebels, but Du Zeng defeated them in every bout.

In 317, Wang Dun sent Zhao You (趙誘) and Zhu Gui (朱軌) to help Wang Yi. Tao Kan's former generals were considering surrender at this point, a sentiment shared by Du Zeng. Thus, Du Zeng pledged to Wang Yi that he would defeat Diwu Yi to clear his name. However, after killing Diwu Yi, he later went to Yangkou (揚口, in present-day Qianjiang, Hubei) and placed Wang Yi under siege. Zhao You and Zhu Gui fought Du Zeng at Lake Nüguan (女觀, in present-day Zhicheng, Hubei) but the two were killed in battle. Du Zeng pressed on to Miankou (沔口, in present-day Hankou, Hubei), so Sima Rui responded by sending Zhou Fang to deal with him.

Zhou Fang and Du Zeng faced each other at Dunyang (沌阳, in present-day Wuhan, Hubei). Du Zeng knew that Zhou Fang was leading the central army and was wary of his abilities, so he focused on destroying Zhou's left and right flanks. Despite his success in doing so, Zhou Fang was able to maintain his army's morale. By noon, both of Zhou Fang's army's flanks had collapsed. Du Zeng then approached the centre when suddenly, Zhou Fang and his men started beating their drums. 800 of Zhou Fang's elite troops violently charged into Du Zeng's lines, killing and scattering them by the thousands. Zhou Fang pursued Du Zeng through the night until they reached Wudang, where Du Zeng held out for the next two years.

In 319, Du Zeng was caught in a surprise attack by Zhou Fang, causing chaos among Du Zeng's men. Overwhelmed, Du Zeng's generals arrested him and gave themselves up to Zhou Fang. Zhou Fang initially wanted to spare him as a prisoner but Zhao You and Zhu Gui's children, Zhao Yin (趙胤) and Zhu Chang (朱昌), wanted to avenge their fathers. Zhou Fang permitted them, so Du Zeng was beheaded. His body was later chopped up and consumed by Zhao Yin and Zhu Chang.
