= Wang Cheng (Jin dynasty) =

Chinese Jin dynasty official (c. 269–312)

- 王澄

Inspector of Jing province (荊州刺史)
- In office 308 – 312
- Monarch: Emperor Huai of Jin

Personal details
- Born: c.269
- Died: c.312
- Relations: Wang Yan (brother)
- Children: Wang Zhan; Wang Hui
- Parent: Wang Yi (father)
- Courtesy name: Pingzi (平子)
- Posthumous name: Xian (憲)

Wang Cheng (c.269 – c.312), (Note: Wang Cheng's biography in Jin Shu recorded that he died at the age of 44 (by East Asian reckoning). In his Zizhi Tongjian Kaoyi, Sima Guang recorded that when Wang Cheng died, Zhou Yi's defeat, Wang Dun garrisoning Yuzhang and Wang Ji invading Guangzhou happened were all not recorded in their respective biographies or the annals of Emperor Huai in Book of Jin. Wei Jie's (grandson of Wei Guan) biography in Book of Jin recorded that he died in 312 (6th year of the Yongjia era of Emperor Huai's reign), shortly after seeking refuge with Wang Dun at Yuzhang. Thus, Sima Guang dated these events to that year.) courtesy name Pingzi, was an official of the Jin dynasty (266–420). He was the younger brother of the minister, Wang Yan. As part of his brother's strategy to assist the Prince of Donghai, Sima Yue, Wang Cheng was assigned to guard the key region of Jing province in the south. Though once considered a promising and upright official, Wang's tenure in Jing saw him neglect his official affairs and fail to quell the rebellions of Wang Ru and Du Tao. In the end, he was recalled from his position and assassinated by his cousin, Wang Dun.

== Early life and career ==
Wang Cheng was a member of the prestigious Wang clan of Langya as the younger brother of the minister, Wang Yan. In his youth, he was known for his intelligence and ability to discern one's intentions only through their actions. When he was 14, his brother's wife, Lady Guo ordered her maid to carry excrement on the road. Wang Cheng reprimanded her, but she angrily replied, "When my mother-in-law was dying, she entrusted you to me, not the other way around!" She then grabbed him and wanted to beat him, but Wang Cheng managed to escape and ran through a window.

Later, Wang Cheng became highly renowned, with his peers praising him as a model of human virtue. Wang Yan deeply cherished Wang Cheng along with his cousin, Wang Dun and colleague, Yu Ai (庾敳). (Note: Yu Ai was a cousin of Yu Liang's father.) He once publicly declared, "A'ping (Wang Cheng) is first, Zisong (Yu Ai) is second and Chuzhong (Wang Dun) is third." Wang Yan even considered himself inferior to Wang Cheng and elevated his fame.

Wang Cheng held several important offices at a young age and eventually became an Attendant Officer of the Household Gentlemen for the Prince of Chengdu, Sima Ying. The prince had a eunuch, Meng Jiu (孟玖), who was hated for condemning the brothers, Lu Ji and Lu Yun to their deaths. Wang Cheng uncovered Meng Jiu's treachery and persuaded Sima Ying to execute him, much to the joy of many. After the defeat of Sima Ying in the War of the Eight Princes in 304, the Prince of Donghai, Sima Yue (Note: Sima Yue was the last regent for Emperor Hui of Jin, and extended his regency into Emperor Huai's reign.) invited Wang Cheng to serve as his Chief Clerk. He was later promoted to General Who Establishes Might and Inspector of Yong province, but turned down the positions. By then, many famous officials like Wang Dun, Xie Kun (Note: father of Xie Shang) and Yu Ai associated themselves with Wang Cheng, and they all led lavish and dissipated lifestyles.

== As Inspector of Jing province ==
=== Three Rabbit Burrows Strategy ===
In 308, as part of their "three rabbit burrows strategy (狡兔三窟)", Wang Yan and Sima Yue appointed Wang Cheng as Inspector of Jing province, Chief Controller and Colonel of the Southern Man, while Wang Dun was appointed Inspector of Qing province. Wang Yan asked Wang Cheng about his plans, and Wang Cheng impressed his peers through his words and strategies. Only Wang Dun was unconvinced, stating "One should adapt to circumstances and not pre-plan." On the day of his departure, the entire court went to see Wang Cheng off, during which he saw a magpie nest on a tree. In a bizarre display, he disrobed himself, climbed the tree and began playing with the nest as if there was no one around him.

When he reached his post, Wang Cheng began drinking day and night and neglected his official duties. He instead entrusted all of his responsibility to his Assistant Officer, Guo Shu (郭舒), even as the region came under threat from the constant rebellions of the local tribes. Guo Shu strongly remonstrated him to change his ways, but to no avail. Wang Cheng's friend Wang Ji also became an important henchman of Wang Cheng's rule.

=== Failure to relieve Luoyang and Xiangyang ===
In 310, the capital Luoyang came under threat from the Han-Zhao dynasty and sent out an urgent call of reinforcements. The General Who Conquers the South, Shan Jian attempted to provide relief from his base in Xiangyang, but was defeated by the refugee rebel leader, Wang Ru in the Nanyang Basin. At the time, Wang Cheng also personally led his forces to reinforce Luoyang, but turned back at Yikou (沶口; in present-day Yicheng, Hubei) after receiving news of Shan Jian's defeat.

Wang Cheng then heard that the rebels were laying siege to Xiangyang, so he sent an envoy to Shan Jian to assess the situation. However, one of Wang Ru's generals, Yan Yi (嚴嶷) managed to apprehend the envoy. He had one of his men pretend to be someone from Xiangyang and tell the envoy that both the city and Shan Jian had been captured. Yan Yi feigned carelessness and allowed the envoy to escape back to Wang Cheng, who was fed the false information. Believing him, Wang Cheng dispersed his troops and returned. In reality, Shan Jian managed to escape to Xiakou (夏口; in present-day Wuhan, Hubei) while Wang Ru was forced to lift his siege due to the Han general, Shi Le. Wang Cheng was ashamed when he found out, claiming that he did not have enough grain and shifted the blame to his Chief Clerk, Jiang Jun (蔣俊), who he then executed.

=== Du Tao's rebellion ===
During this period, there was an influx of refugees in Jing province from the Ba-Shu region fleeing from the war against the Cheng-Han rebel state. These refugees, after years of oppression at the hands of the local people, rebelled at Lexiang (樂鄉; northeast of present-day Songzi, Hubei) under their leader, Li Xiang (李驤, not to be confused with the Cheng general of the same name, Li Xiang). However, when Wang Cheng sent the Interior Minister of Chengdu, Wang Ji against them, Li Xiang quickly asked to surrender. Wang Cheng pretended to agree, but then proceeded to attack and kill Li Xiang. He claimed Li's wife as his own and drowned more than 8,000 of his followers in the Yangtze river.

The refugees were enraged by Wang Cheng's betrayal, and when word spread the Inspector of Xiang province, Xun Tiao (荀眺) was planning to execute all of them, they reignited their rebellion with Du Tao at the helm. The rebels occupied numerous commanderies in the south and defeated Wang Ji at Baling (巴陵, in modern Yueyang, Hunan). Despite the crisis, Wang Cheng continued drinking and gambling with Wang Ji for days. They even killed a wealthy magnate, Li Cai (李才), seizing his wealth and giving it to Guo Shu. The Administrator of Nanping, Ying Zhan scolded them but was ignored. Thus, resentment and dissident grew both within and outside Jing province.

Though his reputation was now tarnished, Wang Cheng remained arrogant and self-confident. He led his army to camp at Zuotang (作塘; in present-day Gong'an County, Hubei), intending to attack Du Tao. However, the former Army Advisor of Shan Jian, Wang Chong (王沖), rebelled in Yu province and declared himself the new Inspector of Jing province. Wang Cheng panicked and sent his general, Du Rui to guard Jiangling while he withdrew to Canling (孱陵; in present-day Anxiang County, Hunan) (Note: The character "孱" has two pronunciations: "càn" and "chán".) and then further south to Tazhong (沓中; east of Anxiang county). (Note: In his annotations to Zizhi Tongjian, Hu Sanxing wrote that this Tazhong was not the more famous one where Jiang Wei grew crops; this Tazhong was probably east of Canling.) Guo Shu proposed that they recruit the soldiers of Huarong in the west to launch a counterattack, but Wang Cheng did not heed his advice.

Initially, Wang Cheng ordered the officials around Wuling Commandery (武陵郡; around present-day Changde, Hunan) to carry out a joint attack on Du Tao, one of who was the Administrator of Tianmen, Hu Gui (扈瑰) at Yiyang. When the Interior Minister of Wuling, Wu Cha (武察) was killed by the local tribes, Hu Gui retreated with a small force, which led to Wang Cheng angrily replacing Hu Gui with the official, Du Zeng. A former subordinate of Hu Gui, Yuan Sui (袁遂), intending to avenge his superior, raised an army and drove out Du Zeng before proclaiming himself General Who Pacifies the Jin. Wang Cheng dispatched Guanqiu Miao (毌丘邈) to put down his revolt, but Yuan Sui defeated him. (Note: By late 311, both Sima Yue and Wang Yan had died, while Luoyang had fallen in the Disaster of Yongjia.)

== Death and posthumous honours ==
Seeing the chaotic situation in Jing province, the Prince of Langya, Sima Rui summoned Wang Cheng serve as Libationer-Advisor of the Army at Jianye while Zhou Yi replaced him as Inspector of Jing. Wang Cheng did not object and promptly left for the prince's headquarters. Along the way, he stopped by Yuzhang (豫章郡; around present-day Nanchang, Jiangxi) to pay a visit to Wang Dun, who was serving as the Inspector of Jiang province and Commander of the Punitive Expedition for Sima Rui. Although his cousin had by then surpassed him in reputation, Wang Cheng still belittled Wang Dun and disrespected him in their conversations.

Furious, Wang Dun invited him to stay overnight with the intention of killing him. Wang Cheng had twenty bodyguards surrounding him and often held a jade pillow to defend himself. However, that night, Wang Dun offered the bodyguards wine, and after they were all drunk asleep, he asked Wang Cheng if he could closely inspect his jade pillow. Wang Cheng unwittingly agreed, and once he was disarmed, Wang Dun accused him of collaborating with Du Tao. Wang Cheng was shocked and grabbed him by his clothes, but Wang Dun broke free and came back with a strong man named Lu Rong (路戎). Climbing onto a beam, he cursed his cousin "Acting like this, you will surely suffer disaster!" Lu Rong then strangled Cheng to death.

Wang Dun went on to rebel against the Jin dynasty, but was defeated in 324. After his defeat, Wang Cheng's former staff member Huan Zhi (桓稚) submitted a petition requesting Wang Cheng be awarded a posthumous name. The imperial court restored Wang Cheng to his original offices and bestowed him the posthumous name of "Xian" (憲).
