= Sun Chu (Western Jin) =

Sun Chu (孫楚; died 282) was a native of Zhongdu commandery (中都縣; in present-day Pingyao) in Shanxi; who when quite young wished to become a recluse, and said to Wang Ji (王濟), "I will wash my mouth with rocks, and pillow my head on the running stream." "How will you manage that?" enquired Wang, smiling at his slip of the tongue. "Oh," replied Sun, not the least taken aback, "I will use the rocks for tooth powder, and the stream to cleanse my ears." He had passed his fortieth year before he entered upon an official career. Rising to high military command, he was received at an audience by the Emperor; but he absolutely refused to kneel, and would do no more than bow, alleging that a guardian of the Throne should never let himself be at a disadvantage.

This story is the origin of a phrase in Chinese and other languages that were influenced by it, such as Japanese, "漱石枕流". Literally "gargle rock pillow stream", it refers to a sore-loser who refuses to back down ever after making a mistake and continues to defend it to the end regardless of how unlikely the argument is. It may also be the origin of the ateji for the Japanese word sasuga, or "流石", whose actual meaning is unrelated.
