= Zhou Fu (Western Jin) =

Jin dynasty official (died Feb 311)

- 周馥

General Who Pacifies the East (平東將軍)
- In office 307 – 311
- Monarch: Emperor Huai of Jin

Personal details
- Born: Unknown Yucheng, Shandong
- Died: 311
- Relations: Zhou Jun (cousin) (Note: Per Zhou Jun's biography in Book of Jin, Jun had praised his cousins Zhou Fu and Zhou Hui in front of Emperor Wu. A New Account of the Tales of the World, citing Wang Yin's Jin Shu, recorded that Zhou Hui's father was Zhou Long, son of Zhou Fei. Zhou Jun's biography in Book of Jin recorded that his father was Zhou Pei. If all records were correct, then Zhou Pei should be Zhou Long's brother and Zhou Fei's son.); Zhou Yi (cousin's son) (Note: Zhou Yi was Zhou Jun's son.)
- Children: Zhou Mi; Zhou Qiao
- Parent: Zhou Rui (father)
- Courtesy name: Zuxuan (祖宣)
- Peerage: Earl of Yongning (永甯伯)

Zhou Fu (died February 311), courtesy name Zuxuan, was an official of the Jin dynasty (266–420). As a minister, he rose through the ranks of the Jin government and was one of the chief officials managing the Eastern Court (東臺) in Luoyang after Emperor Hui of Jin was moved to the Western Court (西臺) in Chang'an. Following the Prince of Donghai, Sima Yue's victory in the War of the Eight Princes, Zhou Fu was assigned to guard Yang province north of the Yangzi, while the southern part of the province was guarded by the Prince of Langya, Sima Rui. As Zhou Fu was castigated for his proposal to move the Jin capital to his base in Shouchun, Sima Rui took the opportunity to attack Zhou Fu and annex northern Yang for himself.

== Early life and career ==
Zhou Fu was born into the Zhou clan of Runan Commandery as the son of Zhou Rui (周蕤), the administrator of Anping; among Zhou Fu's cousins were Zhou Jun (father of Zhou Yi) and Zhou Hui (maternal grandfather of Prince Sima Tan). He was famous in his youth alongside his friend, Chenggong Jian, and the two of them started their careers teaching the Sima princes of the Western Jin dynasty. He was promoted to Left Western Subordinate to the Minister Over the Masses, Wang Hun, who then recommended for him to become a Gentleman of Writing. He then went on to serve a succession of offices including Gentleman of the Secretariat and Inspector of Xu province, the former during which he was praised for his ability to pick out talents. He eventually returned to Luoyang to serve as a minister of justice.

== War of the Eight Princes ==
In 304, the Prince of Donghai, Sima Yue brought Emperor Hui of Jin with him from Luoyang to attack the Prince of Chengdu, Sima Ying at Ye. However, he was defeated at the Battle of Dangyin, and Emperor Hui fell into Sima Ying's care. Yue's generals, Shangguan Si (上官巳) and Chen Zhen (陳眕) fled back to Luoyang with the crown prince, Sima Tan and took control of the capital. They handed out positions to Zhou Fu, but even after Sima Tan ordered him to cooperate, Zhou Fu refused as he believed that Shangguan Si was committing treason. As Shangguan Si became increasingly cruel and violent, Zhou Fu plotted with the minister, Man Fen to overthrow him. However, the plot was discovered, and Man Fen was killed while Zhou Fu barely escaped the city when Shangguan Si's forces attacked them.

Luoyang soon fell to Zhang Fang, a general of the Prince of Hejian, Sima Yong, allowing Zhou Fu to return to the capital as Intendant of Henan. After Zhang Fang received Emperor Hui and Sima Ying under his custody, they were forcibly moved to Sima Yong's base in Chang'an, but Zhou Fu remained behind and continued running the government in Luoyang with his fellow ministers, Xun Fan and Liu Tun. There were thus effectively two capitals; Chang'an was referred to as the Western Court while Luoyang was referred to as the Eastern Court. In 305, Zhou Fu, along with Liu Tun and others, opposed Sima Yong’s order to have Empress Yang Xianrong commit suicide, as dissidents in Luoyang were using her name to rebel. Yong had Liu Tun marked for arrest, but spared Zhou Fu and seemingly cancelled his order on the empress.

In early 306, Zhou Fu welcomed Sima Yue when he recaptured Luoyang and was allowed to serve in his administration. Among other offices he received, Zhou Fu was appointed Chief Controller of the Armies and was stationed at Mianchi. Later that year, Sima Yue and others rescued Emperor Hui from Chang'an and moved him back to Luoyang. Zhou Fu was appointed. Zhou Fu was appointed General Who Pacifies the East and Chief Controller of military affairs in Yang province. He also replaced Liu Zhun (劉準) as General Who Guards the East and was assigned to Shouchun.

== Guarding northern Yang province ==
To the south of Shouchun, the Jiangnan region had been under the control of the rebel, Chen Min since 305, but in 307, the local gentry clans, with the help of Liu Zhun, rose up to overthrow him. Zhou Fu continued to support clans after he was assigned to Shouchun, and following Chen Min's defeat, he sent the rebel's head to Luoyang and was awarded to title of Earl of Yongning. In August 307, Sima Yue garrisoned the Prince of Langya, Sima Rui to Jianye to serve as Chief Controller of military affairs in Yang province south of the Yangzi river, thus reducing Zhou Fu's authority in Yang to north of the Yangzi.

Despite having been allies, Zhou Fu began openly criticizing Sima Yue for his abuse of power over the imperial court and treacherous behaviour, which irritated the prince. Meanwhile, the Jin had been at war with the Han-Zhao dynasty in northern China, and with each day the Han forces was growing closer to Luoyang. In 310, Zhou Fu and his subordinates, Wu Si (吳思) and Yin Shi (殷識) submitted a petition to imperial court urging them to move the capital to Shouchun for their safety. Sima Yue was furious that Zhou Fu submitted such a petition without his permission and recalled him to Luoyang. Zhou Fu was hesitant to return, so he ordered the administrator of Huainan, Pei Shuo (裴碩) to go before him. However, Pei Shuo accused him of overstepping his authority and falsely claimed that he received an order from Sima Yue to attack him. Zhou Fu was able to repel Pei Shuo, prompting him to retreat to Dongcheng (東城; in present-day Quanjiao County, Anhui), where he requested for reinforcements from Sima Rui.

In 311, Sima Rui ordered his generals, Gan Zhuo and Guo Yi (郭逸) to attack Shouchun. The administrator of Anfeng Commandery, Sun Hui also raised his army against Zhou Fu and had his subordinate, Xie Yan (謝摛) write a letter accusing him for his crimes. Xie Yan had previously worked under Zhou Fu, and when Zhou received the letter, he wept and said, "This can only be Xie Yan's words!" Zhou Fu held out in Shouchun for ten days, but he was finally defeated and wanted to flee Xiang county (項縣; present-day Shenqiu County, Henan). However, he was intercepted and detained by the Prince of Xincai, Sima Que (司馬確; son of Sima Teng). He reportedly fell ill due to anger and grief, and soon died in captivity.

After his death, the minister, Hua Tan appealed to Sima Rui to rehabilitate Zhou Fu's honour, and the prince was able to reach a degree of understanding for Zhou Fu. He had two sons, Zhou Mi (周密) and Zhou Qiao (周矯), both who served as Jin officials, while his cousin's son Zhou Yi was an important minister under Sima Rui.
