= Zhou Yi (Jin dynasty) =

Chinese Jin dynasty official (269-322)

- 周顗

Supervisor of the Left of the Masters of Writing (尚書左僕射)
- In office 320 – 322
- Monarch: Emperor Yuan of Jin

Personal details
- Born: 269 (Note: Zhou Yi's biography in Book of Jin recorded that he was 54 (by East Asian reckoning) when he died.) Runan County, Henan
- Died: 322 Nanjing, Jiangsu
- Children: Zhou Min; Zhou Tian; Zhou Yi
- Parent(s): Zhou Jun (father); Li Luoxiu (mother)
- Courtesy name: Boren (伯仁)
- Peerage: Marquis of Wucheng (武城侯)
- Posthumous name: Kang (康)

Zhou Yi (269 – 25 April 322), (Note: The Zizhi Tongjian recorded that Zhou Yi and Dai Yuan were both executed on the bingzi day of the 3rd month of the 1st year of the Yongchang era. The annals of Emperor Yuan in Book of Jin recorded the month as the 4th month, which is an error.) courtesy name Boren, posthumously known as Marquis Kang of Wucheng (武城康侯), was an official of the Jin dynasty (266–420). Following the Disaster of Yongjia, he fled to southern China to join the Prince of Langya and later Emperor Yuan of Jin, Sima Rui. Though he often found himself in trouble, mainly due to his drunken behaviour, he became one of Emperor Yuan's trusted aides in his effort to counter the powerful Wang clan of Langya. After Wang Dun forced Emperor Yuan into submission in 322, Zhou Yi defiantly refused to acknowledge Wang's authority, and was executed alongside Dai Yuan.

Zhou Yi, along with his friend Wang Dao, is the protagonist of a famous Chinese proverb, "I did not kill Boren, but Boren died because of me" (我不殺伯仁，伯仁卻因我而死; Wǒ bù shā Bórén, Bórén què yīn wǒ ér sǐ), which means to feel guilt for indirectly causing one's death.

== Early life ==
Zhou Yi was a son of the Western Jin general, Zhou Jun (周浚) from the Zhou clan of Runan; among Zhou Jun's cousins were Zhou Hui (周恢) (Note: Zhou Hui was the maternal grandfather of Prince Sima Tan. He was praised by his paternal cousin Zhou Jun in front of Emperor Wu. At the same occasion, Jun also praised Zhou Fu. A New Account of the Tales of the World, citing Wang Yin's Jin Shu, recorded that Zhou Hui's father was Zhou Long, son of Zhou Fei. Zhou Jun's biography in Book of Jin recorded that his father was Zhou Pei. If all records were correct, then Zhou Pei should be Zhou Long's brother and Zhou Fei's son.) and Zhou Fu. He was described as handsome, and was renowned in his youth. Many of his close friends and peers all highly respected him for his talents and calm demeanor. Despite his reputation, he initially declined all official appointments from commanderies and counties. Once he turned 20, he inherited his father's peerage of Marquis of Wucheng and was appointed as an Assistant in the Palace Library, eventually rising to the rank of Imperial Secretariat of the Masters of Writing. When the Prince of Donghai, Sima Yue's son, Sima Pi was appointed General Who Guards the Army, Zhou Yi became Sima Pi's Chief Clerk.

After the capital, Luoyang and Emperor Huai were lost in the Disaster of Yongjia in 311, Zhou Yi found refuge under the Minister of Works, Xun Fan and his provisional government at Mi County. Zhou Yi and his colleagues convinced Xun Fan to appoint them as his assistants, and also to recruit the powerful local militia leader Yan Ding to their cause.

However, when news that loyalist forces were on the brink of recapturing Chang'an in the west later that year, Yan Ding wanted to bring Xun Fan's nephew, the Prince of Qin, Sima Ye over to install him as the new emperor. Xun Fan, Zhou Yi and the rest hesitated, as they did not want to leave their homelands in the east. Threatened by Yan Ding's soldiers, Zhou Yi and his peers scattered and fled.

== Service under Emperor Yuan ==
Zhou Yi managed to escape to the Jiangnan region, where the ruling Prince of Langya, Sima Rui initially appointed him as Libationer-Advisor of the Army. In 312, the Inspector of Jing province, Wang Cheng agreed to relinquish his position for Sima Rui, who then gave the position along with Protector-Colonel of the Southern Man to Zhou Yi. As soon as Zhou arrived in Jing, refugees from Jianping (建平, in present-day Jingzhou, Hubei) led by Fu Mi (傅密) revolted and welcomed the rebel leader, Du Tao into their territory. Zhou Yi was powerless and did not know how to deal with the situation. He was besieged by Du Tao at Xunshui (潯水; in present-day Jiujiang, Jiangxi), but the Jin general, Tao Kan dispatched Zhu Ci and forced him to lift the siege. Meanwhile, Zhou Yi left his post and found refuge with the Commander of the Punitive Expedition, Wang Dun.

Wang Dun's Army Advisor, Dai Miao (戴邈) insisted that Zhou Yi should be restored to his position, but Wang disagreed. Instead, Sima Rui reassigned Zhou Yi to briefly serve as General Who Spread Might and Inspector of Yan province. Zhou was later summoned back to the capital at Jiankang to serve as Libationer-Advisor of the Army once again, but this time, the Sima Rui did not allow him to leave and kept him close to his side. He then appointed Zhou as his Chief Clerk of the Right.

In 318, Sima Rui established the Eastern Jin dynasty at Jiankang, becoming posthumously known as Emperor Yuan. After his coronation, the emperor made Zhou Yi the Secretary of Personnel, but he was soon impeached for his drunken behaviour and forced to take up the post as a commoner. Later, he was dismissed after one of his students injured the Left Commandant of Jiankang. Nonetheless, Zhou Yi was still trusted with the position of Junior Tutor to the Crown Prince, Sima Shao (the future Emperor Ming of Jin) that same year. He petitioned to decline the position out of guilt for his past conduct, but the court insisted that he accept the role, choosing to overlook his misdeeds. Later, he was transferred to Supervisor of the Left of the Masters of Writing while concurrently serving as Secretary of Personnel.

Zhou Yi soon succeeded his peer, Dai Yuan as General Who Protects the Army. The Master of Writing, Ji Zhan held a banquet where Zhou Yi and Wang Dao attended among others. During the banquet, Zhou Yi became drunk and broke etiquette. He was once again impeached, but Emperor Yuan issued an edict exempting him from punishment.

== Wang Dun's rebellion and death ==
In 322, Wang Dun, in response to Emperor Yuan's effort to curb the growing power of his clan, launched a rebellion against the court, specifically denouncing the minister, Liu Wei. The official Wen Jiao, asked Zhou Yi, "The general's actions seem to have a point; surely they are not unwarranted?" Zhou replied, "You are still young and naive. No lordship is without fault, perhaps only Yao and Shun. How can a subject assist his master by raising an army against him? Such action cannot be described as anything but rebellious! If that wolf Chuzhong (Wang Dun's courtesy name) is willing to challenge sovereignty, then who knows what limits he has?"

Later, Zhou Yi participated in the attack against Wang Dun at Shitou, where the imperial army suffered a decisive defeat, forcing Emperor Yuan to submit to Wang Dun. The emperor sent his officials, including Zhou Yi, to Shitou to pay their respects to Wang Dun. When it was his turn, Wang, referring to the time he saved Zhou from Du Tao's rebels, told him, "Boren, you have wronged me." Zhou Yi replied, "Your Excellency had to muster chariots to violate authority. This humble minister was trusted to lead the Six Armies, but for he was not worthy, the imperial forces fell. That is how I wronged you!" Wang could not respond. Zhou Yi's Chief Clerk, Hao Gu (郝嘏), urged him to escape from Wang Dun, but he refused, determined to live and die by the court.

Soon, Wang Dun had Zhou Yi arrested along with Dai Yuan. While passing through the Ancestral Temple, Zhou Yi shouted, "The treacherous minister Wang Dun have brought the state to ruins and murdered its loyal ministers. Divine spirits, strike him down quickly!" A guard struck Zhou Yi in the mouth with his halberd, causing him to bleed all the way down to his feet. However, Zhou Yi maintained his calm demenour, and many who saw him wept for him. He and Dai Yuan were then executed at the southern gate of Shitou.

After Wang Dun's defeat to Emperor Ming of Jin in 324, Zhou Yi was posthumously appointed as Household Counsellor of the Left and Yitong Sansi, as well as bestowed the posthumous name of "Kang" (康). He was also offered sacrifices through the Shaolao rites.

== Anecdote ==
=== "I did not kill Boren, but Boren died because of me" ===
During Wang Dun's rebellion, his cousin Wang Dao and other family members at Jiankang all anxiously waited for a judgment from the court due to their ties to Wang Dun. Zhou Yi was worried for Wang Dao and his family, so he one day went to court to argue for their innocence. Along the way, Wang Dao saw him and pleaded him to save his family's lives. However, Zhou Yi ignored him and went straight into the building. Before Emperor Yuan, Zhou Yi recounted Wang Dao's loyalty and vehemently pleaded for the utmost extent of clemency for Wang. The emperor agreed, and Zhou celebrated his victory by drinking. When he left the building, Wang was still waiting by the gate and called out to him, but Zhou continued to ignore him and vaguely remarked, "Once we kill those scoundrels this year, I'll have a big golden seal tied behind my elbow." Zhou also submitted several petitions to clear Wang name, but Wang, not knowing they were written by Zhou, deeply resented him.

After Emperor Yuan's surrender, Wang Dun asked Wang Dao, "Zhou Yi and Dai Yuan are the pride of the north and south. No doubt they should be appointed to the Three Excellencies, yes?" Wang Dao did not reply. Wang Dun then said, "If not the Three Excellencies, then perhaps they should serve under me?" Wang Dao still refused to say a word. In the end, Wang Dun said, "Otherwise, I will just have them both killed." Wang Dao did not intercede.

Later, while looking through the documents of the Palace Secretariat, Wang Dao discovered the petition that Zhou Yi had written to save him and his family. Realizing his mistake, Wang Dun wept and famously said, "I did not kill Boren, but Boren died because of me! I have betrayed a good friend to the netherworld!"
