= Xun Guan =

4th-century Chinese Jin dynasty general

- Traditional Chinese: 荀灌
- Simplified Chinese: 荀灌
Transcriptions
Standard Mandarin
- Hanyu Pinyin: Xún Guàn

Xun Guan (303–?) was a Chinese military general of the Jin dynasty (266–420). She was an ancient Chinese heroine who famously led a group of soldiers into battle at the age of thirteen (by East Asian reckoning). She is said to have broken through enemy lines to call for reinforcements and prevent the city of Wancheng (宛城; in present-day Nanyang, Henan) from falling.

== Life and legacy ==
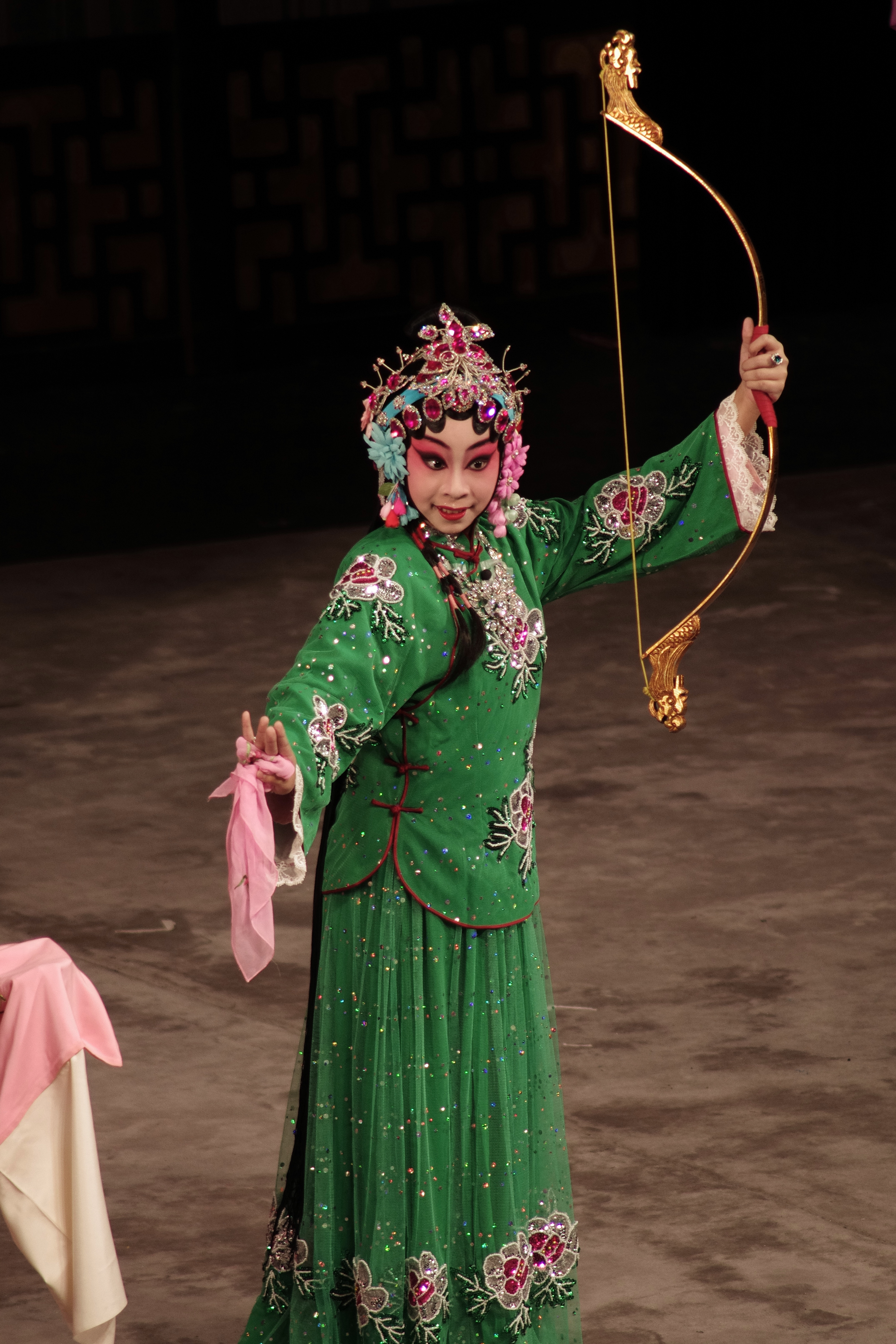
Xun Guan portrayed by a 11-year-old Peking opera actress during a 2015 performance in Tianchan Theatre, Shanghai, China.

Xun Guan was the daughter of Xun Song (荀崧; 263?-329?), the Chief Controller of Jingzhou north of the Yangzi, who in turn was descended from Xun Yu, a famous adviser to the Han dynasty warlord Cao Cao. The Book of Jin describes her as having an exceptional spirit since she was young.

During the 310s, Jingzhou became a contested region between Jin and southern rebel groups. In 315, the rebel leader, Du Zeng, laid siege on Xun Song's base in Wancheng to capitalize on a recent victory over Jin. Defenders were few in the city, and provisions eventually declined to a point where reinforcements were required to stave off the attack. As the city was surrounded, the only option was for a party to break through enemy lines and request for help from the Administrator of Xiangcheng (襄城, in modern Xuchang, Henan), Shi Lan (石覽) and the General of the Household Gentlemen of the South, Zhou Fang. The 13 year-old Xun Guan volunteered for the task. Leading a small group of soldiers, she waited to night to climb over the city walls and penetrate the enemy lines. She and her men fought with Du Zeng's men until they escaped into the Luyang Hills (魯陽山).

Xun Guan was able to find Shi Lan and persuaded him into sending reinforcements to Wancheng. She also sent a letter written by her father to Zhou Fang requesting for assistance. Upon seeing the arrival of Zhou Fang and Shi Lan's reinforcements, Du Zeng quickly lifted the siege and retreated.
