= Zhou Fang (Jin dynasty) =

Jin dynasty general (260 - 320)

- 周訪
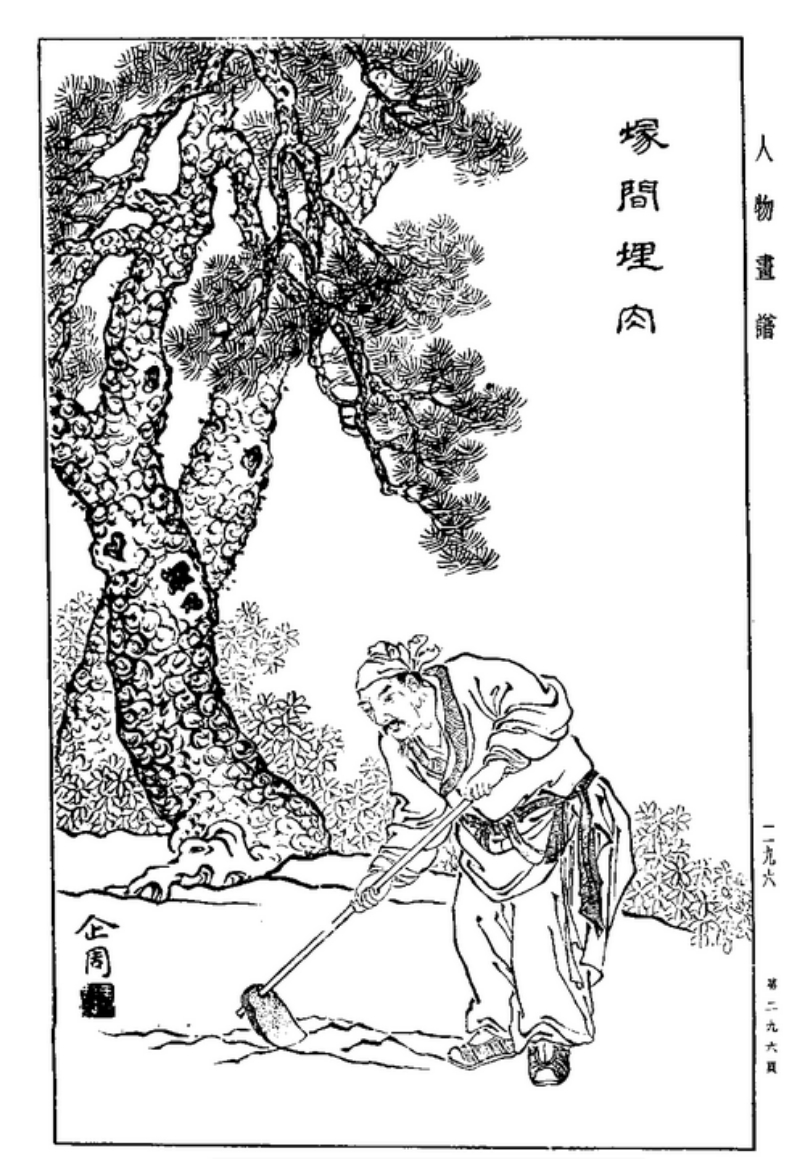

General Who Stabilizes the South (安南將軍)
- In office 319 – September or October 320
- Monarch: Emperor Yuan of Jin

Personal details
- Born: 260 Jiujiang, Jiangxi
- Died: September or October 320 Xiangyang, Hubei
- Children: Zhou Fu; Zhou Guang; Wife of Tao Zhan (Note: Tao Zhan was killed when Jiankang fell to Su Jun during the latter's rebellion.)
- Parent: Zhou Min (father)
- Courtesy name: Shida (士達)
- Peerage: Marquis of Xunyang County (尋陽縣侯)
- Posthumous name: Zhuang (壯)

Zhou Fang (260 – September or October 320), courtesy name Shida, was a Chinese military general of the Jin dynasty (266–420). He was a key commander of Sima Rui, the future Emperor Yuan of Jin, who helped in laying the foundation of the Eastern Jin dynasty. Under Sima Rui, Zhou Fang defeated the Inspector of Jiangzhou, Hua Yi, contributed in the quelling of Du Tao's rebellion and captured the notorious warlord, Du Zeng. Whilst alive, he also deterred the powerful commander, Wang Dun from rebelling against Jin through his presence and opposition. Apart from his military talents, Zhou Fang was also known for his friendship with another famous general, Tao Kan.

== Early life ==
Zhou Fang's ancestors were from the Zhou clan of Runan Commandery, who claimed descent from Ji Lie (姬烈), the youngest son of King Ping of Zhou. Due to the conflicts during the end of the Han dynasty, his family's branch migrated south of the Yangzi River to Xunyang County (尋陽; southwest of present-day Huangmei County, Hubei), Lujiang Commandery (廬江郡). Zhou Fang's grandfather, Zhou Zuan (周纂), and his father, Zhou Min (周敏), both served as generals under the Eastern Wu state during the Three Kingdoms period. By the time Zhou Fang was born, his family had lived in Xunyang for four generations. According to the Book of Jin, Zhou Fang was described as resolute, modest and decisive since his youth. He was willing to turn down offices, and would always give away his wealth, although his family was always short on funds as a result.

He eventually became an Officer of Merit in Anyang County, and during his tenure, he met an official serving in Lujiang Commandery named Tao Kan. The two became close friends, and to solidify their friendship, Zhou Fang married his daughter to Tao Kan's son, Tao Zhan (陶瞻). Soon, Zhou Fang was nominated as a Xiaolian, and he was appointed as Gentleman of the Household and Prefect of Shangjia, but he declined the offers. Around this time, a person from Zhou Fang's village stole a cow from his home and had it slaughtered among the tombs. Zhou Fang found the cow's remains, but rather than reporting the incident and punishing the perpetrator, he secretly buried the cow so that no one knew what had happened.

== Service under Sima Rui ==
In 307, the Prince of Langya, Sima Rui, was assigned to Jianye, and in 311, he was appointed Senior General Who Guards the East. After receiving that office, Sima Rui appointed Zhou Fang as one of this Army Advisors. Around this time, there was another person named Zhou Fang who was wanted for committing a severe crime. Officials mistook Zhou Fang as the fugitive and attempted to arrest him, but Zhou Fang angrily struck the guards, causing the people around him to flee. After explaining what had happened to Sima Rui, he was not charged with any crime.

=== War with Hua Yi ===
Despite Sima Rui's authority, the Inspector of Jiangzhou (江州, modern Jiangxi and Fujian), Hua Yi refused to take orders from him. Fearing he may rebel, Rui made Zhou Fang the General Who Spreads Vehemence and ordered him to move to Pengze with 1,200 soldiers to prepare for Hua Yi's attack. However, Zhou Fang respected Hua Yi due to the latter's efforts at helping the people, so he only moved to Eling County (鄂陵; in present-day Caishan, Hubei) in Xunyang to prevent military escalation.

In July 311, Emperor Huai of Jin and the capital, Luoyang were captured by Han-Zhao forces in an event known as the Disaster of Yongjia. One minister, Xun Fan, formed a provisional government, and he and his peers proclaimed Sima Rui as the leader of their alliance. However, Hua Yi and the Inspector of Yuzhou, Pei Xian, refused to acknowledge Sima Rui's authority, so Rui ordered Zhou Fang, Gan Zhuo and Zhao You to campaign against him. One of Zhou Fang's subordinates, Ding Qian (丁乾), was colluding with the Administrator of Wuchang under Hua Yi, Feng Yi (馮逸). However, Zhou Fang uncovered their plot and had Ding Qian executed.

Feng Yi attacked Zhou Fang but was routed, so he retreated to Chaisang. Zhou Fang then attacked Chaisang, so Hua Yi sent his generals Wang Yue (王約), Fu Zha (傅劄) and others to assist Feng Yi. After a huge battle at Penkou (湓口, in modern Jiujiang, Jiangxi), he defeated Hua Yi's forces, and went on to join Gan Zhuo and his allies at Pengze to defeat Hua Yi's admiral, Zhu Ju (朱矩). Hua Yi's allies, Wei Zhan (衛展) and Zhou Guang (周廣), defected to Sima Rui's side and attacked him from behind. As Hua Yi's forces collapsed, he fled to Ancheng County (安成, in modern Ji'an, Jiangxi), but was pursued and captured by Zhou Fang. Zhou Fang executed Hua Yi and his five sons, while Pei Xian fled to Youzhou. For his efforts at pacifying Jiangzhou, Zhou Fang was appointed General Who Spreads Valor and Administrator of Xunyang.

=== Du Tao's Rebellion ===
Zhou Fang was later active in subjugating the refugee uprising led by Du Tao that had broken out in early 311. Throughout the rebellion, the rebels used modified shadoofs to strike at the Jin ships when they get close. To counter their tactics, Zhou Fang installed long forked beams on his ships to hinder the effectiveness of the shadoofs. In 314, Zhou Fang helped Tao Kan defeat Du Tao's general, Wang Zhen (王眞) at Linzhang (林障; in present-day Hanyang District, Hubei).

In 315, Zhou Fang attacked Du Tao's general, Zhang Yan (張彦) and killed him. However, during the battle, he was struck by a stray arrow and lost two of his front teeth as a result. On the same day, he encountered a rebel army that outnumbered his own across a river. Not wanting to engage in battle, Zhou Fang secretly ordered his men to gather firewood, and after returning, get into formation and beat the drums. At night, he ordered them to light several bonfires. The rebels though that reinforcements had arrived to help Zhou Fang, so they decided to retreat. However, believing that the rebels would soon return, Zhou Fang quickly crossed north of the river and destroyed the bridge to prevent the rebels from pursuing. As predicted, the rebels returned but were unable to cross the river, so they returned to Xiangzhou (相州, roughly modern Handan, Hebei).

Zhou Fang regrouped his navy and advanced to Xiangcheng (湘城; in present-day Changsha, Hunan) while his army moved to Fukou (富口; in present-day Yangxin County, Hubei). In response, Du Tao sent his general, Du Hong to fight him. When Wang Dun's base in Penkou was threatened by Du Hong, Zhou Fang led his army on foot and secretly crossed the river at Chaisang to attack him. The rebels retreated to Luling where Zhou Fang laid siege on them. He had to briefly withdraw to defend his grain depot from rebels in Baqiu, but he soon returned to continue the siege. Du Hong managed to escape the city, supposedly after distracting Zhou Fang's men by throwing out treasures and valuable goods outside the wall. Zhou Fang gave chase and captured many of Du Hong's saddles, horse armour and canes. Du Hong was later defeated by the Administrator of Nankang and forced to flee to Linhe (臨賀; around present-day Hezhou, Guangxi).

Du Tao was eventually defeated in 315. For his efforts, Sima Rui promoted Zhou Fang to Dragon-Soaring General and Commander of the Expeditionary Forces, while Wang Dun petitioned him to become Administrator of Yuzhang. He was also given the title of Marquis of Xunyang County.

=== Capturing Du Zeng ===
While Du Tao's rebellion was happening, another rebel, Du Zeng, was also causing problem for Jin in Xiangzhou and Jingzhou. In 315, Du Zeng laid siege on the Chief Controller of Jingzhou, Xun Song, at Wancheng. Xun Song's daughter, Xun Guan was able to fight her way out and deliver a letter to Zhou Fang requesting for reinforcements. Zhou Fang sent his son, Zhou Fu with 3,000 soldiers to help Xun Song. Seeing the arrival of reinforcements, Du Zeng lifted the siege and retreated.

In 317, Sima Rui ordered Zhou Fang to campaign against Du Zeng. Zhou Fang marched with 8,000 men to Dunyang (沌陽; in present-day Wuhan, Hubei) to fight Du Zeng's army. Zhou Fang ordered his generals, Li Heng (李恆) and Xu Chao (許朝), led the left wing and right wing respectively while he commanded the central army with his flags and banners held up high. As anticipated, Du Zeng was wary of Zhou Fang, so he attacked the Jin army's flanks first. Meanwhile, Zhou Fang knew that Du Zeng had a well-known reputation for being a powerful foe, so to calm his soldiers down, Zhou Fang shot a pheasant at the back of his camp. He also informed them to beat the drums thrice if one of the wings was destroyed, and six times if both wings were destroyed. Zhou Fang then selected 800 elite soldiers, treated them with wine and instructed them not to make rash decisions until they hear the drums. After both flanks were defeated, Zhou Fang personally beat the drums six times, and his elite soldiers sprang up and rushed towards the enemies. Du Zeng's men scattered, and more than a thousand of the rebels were killed.

Zhou Fang pursued Du Zeng through the night, despite his generals suggesting that they wait until morning. He recaptured the areas around the Han and Mian (沔水) rivers while Du Zeng fled into the Wudang Mountains. Zhou Fang was awarded with the offices of General of the Household Gentlemen of the South, Chief Controller of Liangzhou and Inspector of Liangzhou, and was assigned to Xiangyang. In 319, he ambushed and defeated Du Zeng, prompting the rebel generals to arrest Du Zeng and surrender to him. Initially, Zhou Fang wanted to send Du Zeng to Wuchang as a prisoner, but at the behest of his subordinates, Zhu Chang (朱昌) and Zhao Yin (趙胤), whose fathers were killed by Du Zeng, he had him beheaded instead.

=== Conflict with Wang Dun ===
Despite being peers, Zhou Fang was at odds with Wang Dun. Previously, after Wang Dun unfairly removed Tao Kan from his position as Inspector of Jingzhou, Tao Kan's generals defected to Du Zeng. Wang Dun wanted to kill Tao Kan, but due to Tao Kan's ties to Zhou Fang, he decided not to. When Du Zeng was defeated, the general Diwu Yi (第五猗) was captured and sent to Wang Dun. Zhou Fang advised Wang Dun to not kill him, as he had been forced into joining Du Zeng's rebellion, but Wang Dun refused to listen and executed him. Wang Dun had also promised Zhou Fang that he would be rewarded the office of Inspector of Jingzhou after defeating Du Zeng, but this promise was never fulfilled. He instead sent Zhou Fang a letter explaining his decision as well as jade rings and bowls as gifts, but Zhou Fang furiously threw them all away.

While in Xiangyang, Zhou Fang promoted agriculture and military exercises while being open to public opinions. He would also personally appoint local officials and send their names to the court for recommendation. Wang Dun was wary of Zhou Fang's military capabilities and their mutual distrust, so he refused to take action against him. Meanwhile, Zhou Fang suspected that Wang Dun would one day rebel and made preparations to resist him. He was also planning to reclaim lost Jin territory in the north from Henan, coordinating with the generals, Li Ju and Guo Mo.

== Death ==
Zhou Fang died in September or October 320 at the age of 61 (by East Asian reckoning). He was said to have been well-liked by both officers and soldiers due to his humble character and ability to win the people's support. Sima Rui, now Emperor Yuan of Jin, deeply mourned his death, posthumously appointing him General Who Conquers the West and granting him the posthumous name of "Zhuang" (壯; "strong"). In addition, a monument was also erected in Xunyang County in his honour. After the death of Zhou Fang and another rival general, Zu Ti the following year, Wang Dun would openly rebel against Emperor Yuan in 322.

== Anecdotes ==
Zhou Fang and Tao Kan were the subjects of two anecdotes highlighting their friendship and foreshadowing their eventual fates. The first anecdote regards Tao Kan, whose father had died while he was still of low status. While preparing his father's burial, his cow had also disappeared from his home. When he went out to search for it, an elderly man appeared and said to him, "I saw a cow laying in a ditch below the mountain up ahead. If you hold a burial there, you will achieve a high position as a subject." He then pointed to another mountain and said, "That one is also good. Bury someone there, and you will be an official with a salary-rank of 2,000-dan." After he finished speaking, the man disappeared. Tao Kan found his cow and buried his father at the place that it was at. He then told Zhou Fang about the other mountain. When Zhou Fang's father died, he buried the body at the indicated location. As predicted, Tao Kan achieved great success, and Zhou Fang obtained a high salary; from Zhou Fang to his grandson, three generations of the Zhou family contributed to Yizhou for about 41 years. (Note: Zhou Fang's son Zhou Fu (周抚) joined Huan Wen in the Conquest of Cheng-Han by Jin and later became Inspector of Yizhou; Zhou Fu's son Zhou Chu (周楚) also served as Inspector of Yizhou.)

Another anecdote tells of Zhou Fang and Tao Kan visiting a face reader named Chen Xun (陳訓) in Lujiang Commandery. After assessing them, Chen Xun said, "Both of you will rise to the position of border commanders, and your achievements will be almost equal. However, Lord Tao will have a long life, while Lord Zhou will have a shorter one. The difference between the two of you will be determined by your lifespans." Zhou Fang was one year younger than Tao Kan, but Zhou Fang would die first while Tao Kan would outlive him by roughly 14 years.
