= Wang Dun =

Chinese Jin dynasty general and rebel (266–324)

Personal details
- Relatives: Wang Dao (cousin)

Wang Dun (Chinese: 王敦) (266 (Note: According to Wang Dun's biography in Book of Jin, he was 59 (by East Asian reckoning) when he died. Thus by calculation, his birth year should be 266.) – c.early August 324 (Note: According to Sima Shao's biography in Book of Jin, Wang Dun died shortly after the renshen day of the 7th month of the 2nd year of the Tai'ning era of Shao's reign; the date corresponds to 8 Aug 324 in the Julian calendar. Vol.93 of Zizhi Tongjian indicate that he died soon after the gui'you day of the same month and year, which corresponds to 9 Aug 324 in the Julian calendar.)), courtesy name Chuzhong (處仲), nickname Ahei (阿黑), was a Chinese military general and warlord during the Jin dynasty.

Initially, Wang Dun and his cousin Wang Dao helped Sima Rui (Emperor Yuan) establish himself in Jiangdong. Later, having brought Emperor Yuan to submission with his military force in late 322, Wang Dun had paramount authority. Although he later appeared to intend to seize the Jin throne by force, he grew ill in 324. He later died as his forces were being repelled by Emperor Ming.

== Early career ==
Wang Dun was a member of the Wang clan of Langya, being the son of the Jin official Wang Ji (王基; son of Wang Lan (王览) and nephew of Wang Xiang), and he married Emperor Wu of Jin's daughter Princess Xiangcheng. He served as an assistant to Emperor Hui's crown prince Sima Yu, and when Sima Yu was falsely accused of crime by Empress Jia Nanfeng and deposed in February 300, he risked his life to attend the crown prince's farewell, and received renown from that. When Sima Lun usurped the throne in 301, Wang Dun's uncle Wang Yan (王彦) was Inspector of Yanzhou, and Sima Lun sent Wang Dun to placate Wang Yan. When Sima Jiong invited Wang Yan to join him in rising against Sima Lun, Wang Yan initially refused to commit, fearing Sima Lun's army. Wang Dun convinced his uncle to side with Sima Jiong in removing Sima Lun; this won Wang Yan much acclaim.

He later served as the governor of Yang Province (揚州, modern Zhejiang and southern part of Jiangsu and Anhui). After Sima Rui, then the Prince of Langye, became in charge of the military operations in the area in 307, both Wang Dun and his cousin Wang Dao became key assistants to him, and it was said at the time that the domain was ruled equally by the Simas and the Wangs.

Later, as Jiang (江州, modern Jiangxi and eastern Hubei) and Jing (荊州, modern Hubei and Hunan) Provinces became overrun by agrarian rebels, the strongest of whom was Du Tao (杜弢), the leader of Yi Province (modern Sichuan and Chongqing) refugees who had fled from Cheng-Han, Sima Rui put Wang Dun in charge of the western province operations, and Wang's effective coordination, along with the efforts of Wang's subordinates such as Tao Kan, allowed the rebels to be eventually suppressed. (Note: The Zizhi Tongjian recorded that in c.312, Wang Cheng, a clansman of Wang Dun and younger brother of Wang Yan, was eventually forced to relinquish his post of Inspector of Jingzhou and relocate to Jianye. On his way to Jianye, Wang Cheng offended Wang Dun, who then accused Cheng of consorting with Du Tao, and arranged for Cheng to be strangled.) After suppressing Du Tao, in particular, however, Wang Dun became arrogant and began to see the western provinces as his own domain. After Sima Rui declared himself emperor in 318 (after Emperor Min's execution by Han-Zhao), Wang Dun nominally submitted to him, but continued to strengthen his own domain.

== First campaign against the Jin imperial government ==
Seeing Wang Dun's ambition, Emperor Yuan began to fear him, and he began to group men around him who were against Wang Dun as well, such as Liu Wei and Diao Xie (刁協) -- men of mixed reputation who, in their efforts to suppress the Wangs' power offended many other people. He also reduced the roles that Wang Dun's relatives, including Wang Dao, had in his government, which angered Wang Dun further. Wang Dun was further encouraged by his assistants Qian Feng and Shen Chong, both of whom persuaded him to plan a military confrontation with Emperor Yuan. In 320, however, when Emperor Yuan, against Wang's request, made Sima Cheng (司馬承) the Prince of Qiao (Note: The Prince of Qiao's name has been recorded differently in different sources: as "丞" (Cheng) in Jin Yangqiu and Sima Shi Pu (both cited in Shishuo Xinyu) and as "氶" (Zheng) in some volumes of Zizhi Tongjian; Hu Sanxing noted that the character "承" was erroneous. Per vol.37 of Jin Shu, the Prince of Qiao was a son of Sima Xun (司马逊), son of Sima Yi's brother Sima Jin (司马进). There is another Sima Cheng, who was a son of Sima Yong and grandson of Sima Fu, and was thus a second cousin of the Prince of Qiao. This Sima Cheng's final title was Prince of Wuyi (武邑王), and died during the reign of Emperor Hui of Jin, per vol.63 of Taiping Huanyu Ji (太平寰宇记).) the governor of Xiang Province (湘州, modern Hunan) instead of Shen, Wang Dun was not yet ready to fully break with Emperor Yuan, and therefore allowed Sima Cheng to take his post. In 321, Emperor Yuan further commissioned Dai Yuan and Liu with substantial forces, claiming that they were to defend against Later Zhao attacks, but instead was intending to have them defend against a potential Wang Dun attack.

In spring 322, Wang Dun started his campaign against Emperor Yuan, claiming that Emperor Yuan was being deluded by Liu and Diao, and that his only intent was to clean up the government. He tried to persuade Gan Zhuo, the governor of Liang Province (梁州, then consisting of modern northwestern Hubei and southeastern Shaanxi) and Sima Cheng (司馬承) the governor of Xiang Province to join him, and while both resisted, neither was effective in their campaigns against his rear guards. Wang quickly arrived in Jiankang, defeating Emperor Yuan's forces and entering and pillaging Jiankang easily. Liu fled to Later Zhao, while Diao, Dai, and Zhou Yi were killed. Emperor Yuan was forced to submit and grant Wang Dun additional powers in the west. Wang Dun, satisfied, allowed Emperor Yuan to remain on the throne (Note: Although he toyed with the idea of removing Sima Shao the Crown Prince, fearful of Crown Prince Shao's decisiveness and diligence, Wang ended up not carrying out the idea.), and personally withdrew back to his home base of Wuchang (武昌, in modern Ezhou, Hubei). His forces then defeated and killed Sima Cheng, while a subordinate of Gan's, acting on Wang's orders, assassinated Gan.

== Second campaign against the Jin imperial government ==
After his defeat, Emperor Yuan grew despondent and ill. Around the new year of 323, he died. Crown Prince Shao succeeded to the throne as Emperor Ming. Emperor Ming largely acted as if he were respectful of Wang Dun, yielding many military and governance decisions to him. Wang Dun became even more arrogant than before, and his subordinates, headed by Qian and Shen, became exceeding corrupt and violent. In 324, apprehensive of the powerful native Zhou clan (from which Zhou Qi and Zhou Zha came from) and the Zhou clan of Runan (from which Zhou Yi came from), Wang Dun had many members of both clans killed. (Note: Although Zhou Fang was from the Zhou clan of Ru'nan, his son Zhou Fu was spared as Fu served under Wang Dun. After Wang Dun's rebellion was put down, Zhou Fu and his colleague Deng Yue (father of Deng Xia) were imprisoned, but were later pardoned by Wang Dao.)

Later in 324, Wang Dun grew increasingly ill. He commissioned his nephew Wang Ying (王應), whom he adopted as his own son because he was sonless, to be his deputy, and also commissioned Wen Jiao as the mayor of Jiankang, with intent to have Wen keep an eye on the emperor. He intended that after he died, Wang Ying would lead his army to Jiankang and usurp the throne. However, he did not know that Wen had actually been working with Emperor Ming's brother-in-law Yu Liang, and once Wen arrived in Jiankang, he revealed Wang Dun's illness and his plan, and Emperor Ming decided to take preemptive action, declaring Wang Dun a renegade and summoning the generals on the northern border to come to his aid. Wang, upon hearing this, sent his brother (Wang Ying's biological father) Wang Han (王含) and Qian eastward to again attack Jiankang, but unlike what happened in his first campaign, Wang's forces ran into severe resistance from the imperial troops, greatly enhanced by the battle-tested northern defense troops, and suffered many losses. Upon hearing the bad news, Wang Dun died. Wang Ying did not declare that he had died and tried to carry on the campaign, but was eventually defeated. Wang Ying and Wang Han were captured and killed, and Wang Dun's body was put into a kneeling position and then beheaded, but then returned to the Wang clan for burial.

== Personality and anecdotes ==
Wang Dun had a penchant for cruelty and intolerance. Besides the killing of his clansman Wang Cheng in c.312, Wang Dun also orchestrated the killing of another clansman, Wang Leng (王棱), in c.315. (Note: After Wang Ru surrendered to Wang Dun, Wang Leng admired Wang Ru's bravery and asked Wang Dun to give him over as a subordinate. Dun initially refused, warning his clansman that Wang Ru was an unruly person, while Wang Leng was too temperamental to handle him. When Wang Leng insisted, Wang Dun gave in. Wang Leng made Wang Ru a close aide and treated him well.) When Wang Dun began plotting to usurp the throne, Wang Leng repeatedly tried to dissuade, much to Wang Dun's annoyance. Learning of Wang Ru's (a close aide of Wang Leng) resentment, Dun secretly sent someone to incite Ru to assassinate Leng. Wang Ru then attended a feast hosted by Wang Leng. As the mood began to die down, Wang Ru asked if he could perform a sword dance, which Wang Leng permitted. During his performance, Wang Ru slowly approached Wang Leng, and as his intentions became obvious, Wang Leng instructed him to stop and ordered his attendants to drag him out of the stage. However, before they could do so, Wang Ru charged forward and killed his superior. When news of this reached Wang Dun, he feigned shock and ordered the capture and execution of Wang Ru.

Once, both Wang Dao and Wang Dun attended a banquet; the host (Note: The identity of the host differs according to the source. The Shishuo Xinyu indicated that the host was Shi Chong, while Wang Dun's biography in Jin Shu attributed the cruel act to Wang Su's son (and Wang Yuanji's brother) Wang Kai.) was known to execute any female servant who failed to persuade her assigned guest to empty his cup. When Wang Dao was being served, he forced himself to drink, even though he was not good with alcohol. In contrast, Wang Dun refused to drink. On another occasion, Dao and Dun visited Wang Kai (Wang Su's son and Wang Yuanji's brother). During the gathering, a female musician played a wrong note while playing the di; Wang Kai then had the musician killed. However, Wang Dun remained calm and at ease. (Note: A similar anecdote was recorded in Wang Chengxiang Deyin Ji, and included in A New Account of the Tales of the World by Liu Xiaobiao as an annotation.)

Wang Dun also had a penchant for hypocrisy. Besides his killing of Wang Ru, after Wang Cheng's death, Wei Jie (grandson of Wei Guan) sought refuge with Dun at Yuzhang in c.312, where he was then garrisoned. Wang Dun conversed with Wei Jie for many days; he then remarked to his subordinate Xie Kun (father of Xie Shang), "I did not expect that during the Yongjia era, I can still hear the Qingtan of the Zhengshi era (of Cao Fang's reign). If A'ping (Wang Cheng's childhood name) was here, he would have been mesmerized as well." (Note: This anecdote was recorded in A New Account of the Tales of the World. Wei Jie escaped from Luoyang, which had fallen in July 311 in the Disaster of Yongjia. A Jie Biezhuan annotation indicated a similar anecdote, but recorded that Wang Dun was then at Wuchang, and that Wang made the comment to unnamed subordinates.) (Note: In his Zizhi Tongjian Kaoyi, Sima Guang recorded that when Wang Cheng died, Zhou Yi's defeat, Wang Dun garrisoned Yuzhang and Wang Ji invaded Guangzhou happened were all not recorded in their respective biographies or the annals of Emperor Huai in Book of Jin. Wei Jie's biography in Book of Jin recorded that he died in 312 (6th year of the Yongjia era of Emperor Huai's reign), shortly after seeking refuge with Wang Dun at Yuzhang. Thus, Sima Guang dated these events to that year.)
