= Zhou clan of Runan =

The Zhou family of Runan (Chinese: 汝南周氏; pinyin: Rǔnán Zhōu shì) was a notable Chinese family which descended from Ji Lie (姬烈), the youngest son of King Ping of the Zhou dynasty in 8th century BCE China. Ji Lie's fief was at Runan County, which became the ancestral home of his descendants. Zhou Yong (周邕), an 18th-generation descendant of Ji Lie, is considered the founding father of the Zhou family of Runan. During the Eastern Jin dynasty, the Zhou family of Runan had their home located in the north of the Huai River region. The Zhou family of Runan continued to maintain its influence after the Tang dynasty.

== Prominent members ==
- Zhou Fang, Jin general and official
- Zhou Hui, maternal grandfather of Prince Sima Tan and in-law of Emperor Wu of Jin
- Zhou Fu, Jin official
- Zhou Yi, Jin official
