= Wang Ji (Jin dynasty) =

Chinese Jin dynasty official and rebel (c. 289–315)

Wang Ji (王机), courtesy name Lingming (令明; c.289 (Note: Wang Ji's biography in Book of Jin recorded that he was 17 (by East Asian reckoning) during Chen Hui's (brother of Chen Min) rebellion. The annals of Emperor Hui in Jin Shu and vol.86 of Zizhi Tongjian both recorded that Chen Hui was sent by his brother to attack Jiangzhou in the 12th month of the 2nd year of the Yongxing era; the month corresponds to 1 to 30 Jan 306 in the Julian calendar. By calculation, Wang's birth year should be c.289.) – September or October 315) was a Chinese rebel leader and official during the Jin dynasty (266–420). He occupied Guangzhou in c.312 and styled himself as inspector of the province. While he nominally submitted to the warlord Wang Dun, Wang Dun eventually ordered his subordinate Tao Kan to pacify Guangzhou; Wang Ji died of illness during the pacification.

== Life ==
Wang Ji was from Changsha Commandery; his father Wang Yi (王毅; died c.306) (Note: According to Teng Xiu's biography in Book of Jin, Wang Yi was Administrator of Cangwu Commandery under Eastern Wu when Sun Hao surrendered to Jin in May 280; Wang and Teng both surrendered to Jin as well. Ji Han's biography recorded that Wang Yi was Inspector of Guangzhou when he died during Chen Min's rebellion and before Liu Hong.) had a stint as Inspector of Guangzhou, and was popular among the natives there. Wang Ji was said to be handsome and magnanimous.

In January 306, Chen Min sent his brother Chen Hui to attack Jiangzhou. At the age of 17 (by East Asian reckoning), Wang Ji led a band and helped to defeat Chen Hui. Wang's father Wang Yi probably died later that year. Wang Ji's elder brother Wang Ju (王矩; died c.306), courtesy name Lingshi (令式), was Administrator of Nanping. Due to his role in defeating Chen Hui, Wang Ju was appointed Inspector of Guangzhou, probably as his father's replacement, (Note: Ji Han's biography in Book of Jin recorded that while he was supposed to replace Wang Yi as Inspector of Guangzhou, with Liu Hong's death, he was asked to replace Liu as Inspector of Jingzhou; "Xingzhou" (刑州) was likely an erroneous entry.) but Ju died about a month after he reached Guangzhou.

Wang Ji later befriended Wang Cheng, younger brother of Wang Yan, who was then Inspector of Jingzhou as part of the "three rabbit burrows strategy" (狡兔三窟) Wang Yan had put forward to Sima Yue, Prince of Donghai and regent for Emperors Hui and Huai. (Note: Sima Yue based himself in Xiang county near Xuchang. The strategy was that if the north were to fall, he can choose to flee to Jingzhou or Qingzhou (with the Wang brothers' clansman Wang Dun as inspector) where the trusted inspector can host him. The plan fell through due to the circumstances that befell the two men, but Wang Cheng and Wang Dun were able to amass so much power in the south because of this. Dun in particular grew so powerful that he became a threat to the Eastern Jin regime until his death in August 324.) As Wang Ji admired Wang Cheng, he became a close friend of the latter. Wang Cheng reciprocated the affection; Wang Ji soon became an important henchman of Wang Cheng's rule.

However, both Wang Cheng and Wang Ji were frequently drunk and they neglected administrative affairs; the populace grew increasingly discontent. In c.312, (Note: By this point, both Sima Yue and Wang Yan had died, while Luoyang had fallen in the Disaster of Yongjia.) Wang Cheng was eventually forced to relinquish his post of Inspector of Jingzhou after being repeatedly defeated by the rebel Du Tao, and to relocate to Jianye. On his way to Jianye, Wang Cheng offended Wang Dun, who then accused Cheng of consorting with Du Tao, and arranged for Cheng to be strangled. Fearing for his life, Wang Ji asked Wang Dun to appoint him Inspector of Guangzhou, as his father and elder brother had previously held the post; Wang Dun refused. Wen Shao (温卲), a general stationed at Guangzhou, decided to rebel against the incumbent Inspector of Guangzhou Guo Ne (郭讷), and invited Wang to take over as Inspector; Wang then sent about a thousand of his servants and associates to Guangzhou. While Guo sent troops to intercept Wang, as these troops all formerly served under Wang's father or elder brother, they surrendered to Wang instead. Guo then vacated his position and let Wang take over Guangzhou. (Note: Wang Ji's biography in Book of Jin recorded that when Wang approached Guo to ask for his tally (a symbol of his office), Guo sighed, "In the past, Su Wu managed to retain his tally, and past histories sing his praises. This tally is temporarily placed in my care by the heavenly dynasty (i.e. the Jin imperial court). By my honor, I cannot give it to you; you may send your troops to come claim it." Ashamed, Wang Ji dropped his demand.)

In c.315, Wang Ji, fearing that Wang Dun may attack him, petitioned Wang Dun for the post of Inspector of Jiaozhou. At around the same time, Du Hong (杜弘), a subordinate of Du Tao, surrendered to Wang Ji. Wang Dun then decided to use Wang Ji and Du Hong to attack Liang Shuo; Dun then nominated Ji as Inspector of Jiaozhou. Wang Ji and Du Hong had reached Yulin Commandery when they were repelled by Liang and his nominee as Inspector of Jiaozhou, Xiu Zhan (修湛; son of Xiu Ze [修则] (Note: Xiu Ze had a stint as Inspector of Jiaozhou under Eastern Wu; he was killed in battle against Jin general Mao Jiong in 268. Xiu Zhan's brother Xiu Yun was working alongside Tao Huang when he killed Mao Jiong.)). Wang Ji then returned to Guangzhou together with Du Hong, Wen Shao and Liu Shen (刘沈), a xiucai of Jiaozhou. Wang Dun then sent Tao Kan to pacify Guangzhou. Through Tao's efforts, Wen Shao and Liu Shen were captured and executed, while Wang Ji died of illness and Du Hong surrendered to Wang Dun. Tao Kan's subordinate Xu Gao (许高) dug up Wang's body and beheaded the corpse; Xu also killed Wang's two sons.
