= Du Tao =

Jin dynasty rebel (fl.300-315)

- 杜弢

Prefect of Liling (醴陵令)
- In office 311 – 311
- Monarch: Emperor Huai of Jin

Personal details
- Born: Unknown Chengdu, Sichuan
- Died: 315?
- Relations: Du Zhi (grandfather)
- Courtesy name: Jingwen (景文)

Du Tao (Note: Du's name was recorded as "Mi" (弥) in vol.11 of Huayang Guozhi; the chronicles didn't record Du's deeds or rebellions.) (died 16 September 315? (Note: According to Emperor Min's biography in Book of Jin, Du Tao was killed on the guihai day of the 8th month of the 3rd year of the Jianxing era of his reign. This corresponds to 16 Sep 315 on the Julian calendar. However, this account is contradicted by the account found in Du Tao's own biography in the same work, which claimed that he successfully escaped and disappeared.)), courtesy name Jingwen, was a Chinese rebel leader during the Jin dynasty (266–420). In 311, he was proclaimed the leader of an uprising by Ba and Shu refugees in Jing and Xiang (湘州; in modern Hunan) provinces, who had been oppressed by the local populace. After Du Tao ousted the provincial inspectors, the Prince of Langya, Sima Rui in the east sent his generals Wang Dun, Tao Kan and Zhou Fang to campaign against him. His rebellion lasted for roughly four years, before he presumably died while fleeing in 315.

== Life ==
=== Brief stint under Luo Shang ===
Du Tao was from Chengdu, Yi province (in present-day Sichuan) and was the grandson of a famous official in Shu Han named Du Zhi (杜植) (Note: This is likely an error as the Chronicles of Huayang recorded Du's name as "Du Zhen" (杜祯/贞/桢, depending on the version of Huayang). Huayang went on to record that Du Zhen's courtesy name was Wenran (文然) and he was first recruited by Zhuge Liang into the Shu Han bureaucracy; Du Zhen eventually served as Chief Controller for both Liangzhou and Yizhou.) (Note: Du Tao's father's name was recorded as "Du Zhen" (杜眕) in Book of Jin, and as "杜珍" (same pronunciation) in Chronicles of Huayang. Huayang went on to record that Du Zhen's courtesy name was "Bozhong" (伯重) and that after the unification of China in 280, he was nominated as xiucai.) during the Three Kingdoms period. In 300, during the reign of Emperor Hui of Jin, the official Luo Shang was made Inspector of Yi. It was during this time that Du Tao was likely chosen by Luo Shang to be an Abundant Talent candidate.

In Yi, Luo Shang had an unsteady relationship with a powerful refugee leader named Li Te. Luo Shang was ordered by the court to send the refugees back to Qin and Yong provinces, while Li Te, at the behest of the refugees, wanted to lengthen their stay until it was completely safe for them to return. Luo Shang tolerated them at first, but was later determined to carry out his duty. Li Te's envoy, Yan Shi (閻式), managed to persuade Du Tao into helping the refugees by talking his superior into extending their stay. In fact, Du Tao was inclined to give the refugees a year-long extension instead of Yan Shi's initial proposal of extending to winter. However, Luo Shang refused to listen to Du Tao, so in protest, Du Tao returned his Abundant Talent slate and went back home.

=== Refugee crisis in Jing and Xiang ===
Li Te and the refugees ended up rebelling in 301, and in 304, his son, Li Xiong ousted Luo Shang from Chengdu and founded the Cheng-Han dynasty. During this time, Du Tao fled to Nanping Commandery (南平郡, in present-day Gong'an County, Hubei), where the Administrator, Ying Zhan appreciated his talents and appointed him the Prefect of Liling County.

As war between Cheng and Jin raged on, more refugees from Sichuan began fleeing west to the central Yangzi provinces of Jing and Xiang. These refugees were not welcomed by the Jing populace and often discrimated by the local governors. In 311, a Shu native named Li Xiang (李驤, not to be confused with the Cheng general of the same name, Li Xiang) began a rebellion in Lexiang (樂鄉; northeast of present-day Songzi, Hubei), so Ying Zhan and Du Tao attacked and routed him. Li Xiang surrendered himself to the Inspector of Jing, Wang Cheng (younger brother of Wang Yan), who pretended to accept, but soon killed him and had 8,000 of his followers drowned in the Yangzi.

Wang Cheng's actions only aggravated the refugees' resentment even more. Not long after, another native of Shu named Du Chou (杜疇) rebelled. The recent uprisings by Shu refugees began to arouse suspicion among officials, so the Inspector of Xiang, Xun Tiao (荀眺), planned to carry out a mass execution on the refugees. However, his plans leaked out to the public, which caused the refugees to revolt en masse in Jing and Xiang. Because Du Tao was from Shu and a popular figure, the rebels proclaimed him as their leader.

=== First rebellion ===
Du Tao agreed to lead the rebellion, declaring himself the Governor of Liang and Yi provinces. He occupied the city of Changsha where Xun Tiao resided, forcing him to abandon his post and flee to Guang province. The Inspector of Guang, Guo Ne (郭訥), and Wang Cheng sent their generals to quell the rebellion, but Du Tao routed them. Du Tao allowed his men to plunder and pillage, and for a brief while, he surrendered to the Jin commander, Shan Jian before resuming his revolt. He killed the Administrator of Chengtai, Guo Cha (郭察), and continued his successes by conquering Lingling, Guiyang and Wuchang while killing many officials along the way.

In 312, Wang Cheng, faced with mounting defeats and falling popularity, accepted an offer by the Prince of Langya, Sima Rui in Yang province to give up his office as Inspector of Jing to serve as an official in Jianye. Sima Rui replaced him with his own official, Zhou Yi, but just as Zhou Yi arrived at his base, a refugee from Jianping (建平, in present-day Jingzhou), Fu Mi (傅密) as well as others rose up in support of Du Tao. Du Tao sent his subordinate Wang Zhen (王眞) to help the rebels by attacking Mianyang, enveloping Zhou Yi from two sides. Sima Rui's general, Wang Dun, immediately sent Tao Kan, Zhou Fang and Gan Zhuo to rescue Zhou Yi. (Note: The Zizhi Tongjian recorded that on his way to Jianye, Wang Cheng offended his clansman Wang Dun. Dun then accused Cheng of consorting with Du Tao, and arranged for Cheng to be strangled.)

In 313, Tao Kan saved Zhou Yi at Xunshui by forcing Du Tao to retreat to Lingkou after Tao sent Zhu Ci to reinforce Zhou. He later predicted that Du Tao would go to Wuchang next, so Tao Kan took many shortcuts to get to the commandery as quick as possible. Du Tao had indeed been planning to go to Wuchang, but as Tao Kan had arrived first, he was defeated by a counterattack which caused him to retreat back to Changsha. Later that year, Du Tao faced Tao Kan and Zhou Fang again, but was once more defeated.

=== Brief surrender ===
By 315, Du Tao's forces were beginning to collapse. Continuous defeats against the Jin forces were diminishing his numbers, causing him to ask Sima Rui for surrender. When Sima Rui rejected it, he then wrote a lengthy letter to Ying Zhan, justifying his rebellion by stating the oppression faced by his followers under the Jin regime. Ying Zhan sympathized with him, so he sent the letter to Sima Rui along with his own testimony as to why Du should be pardoned. Sima Rui was impressed by Du's reasonings and sent an official named Wang Yun (王運) to accept his surrender.

Along the way, Du Tao was also appointed as Chief of military affairs in Badong commandery (巴東郡; around present-day Chongqing). However, although Du Tao's surrender was acknowledged by Sima Rui, the Jin generals were eager to claim credit for putting down the rebellion, so they continued relentlessly harassing Du Tao's forces. Du was angered by this and felt that his deal had not been honoured. Therefore, when Wang Yun arrived, Du Tao had him killed and resumed his rebellion.

=== Second rebellion and fate ===
Du Tao sent his general Zhang Yan (張彥) to raid Yuzhang commandery (豫章, present-day Nanchang, Jiangxi). Zhang Yan burned many of the cities and towns in the commandery, but he was later defeated and killed by Zhou Fang's forces. Later, Zhou Fang attempted to attack Xiangcheng with a navy, but at the same time, Du Tao had sent his general Du Hong (杜弘) to attack Penkou (湓口, in present-day Jiujiang, Jiangxi). Zhou Fang turned back to face Du Hong, (Note: Du Hong would later surrender to Wang Ji; the duo would later be repelled by Liang Shuo and Xiu Zhan at Jiaozhou, and defeated by Tao Kan at Guangzhou.) who he had a back and forth battle with, but was eventually successful in turning him away.

Later that year, Du Tao was locked with Tao Kan in a stalemate. In his final battle, Du sent his general Wang Gong (王貢) to lead against Tao Kan. However, Tao managed to convince Wang to defect to his side, which created confusion in Du Tao's army and caused them to scatter. Du Tao also retreated, but what became of him after this was unknown. Three different accounts stated that he either was killed, (Note: The account claiming that he was killed was found in Emperor Min's biography in Book of Jin. The Zizhi Tongjian also adopted this account.) successfully escaped and disappeared (Note: The account claiming his disappearance was found in his own biography in Book of Jin.) or drowned himself in a river. Regardless, the rebellion ended in 315 after Tao Kan recovered Changsha. Du Tao's followers were granted amnesty by Sima Rui after they surrendered.
