= Caishan =

Caishan 蔡山镇
- Town
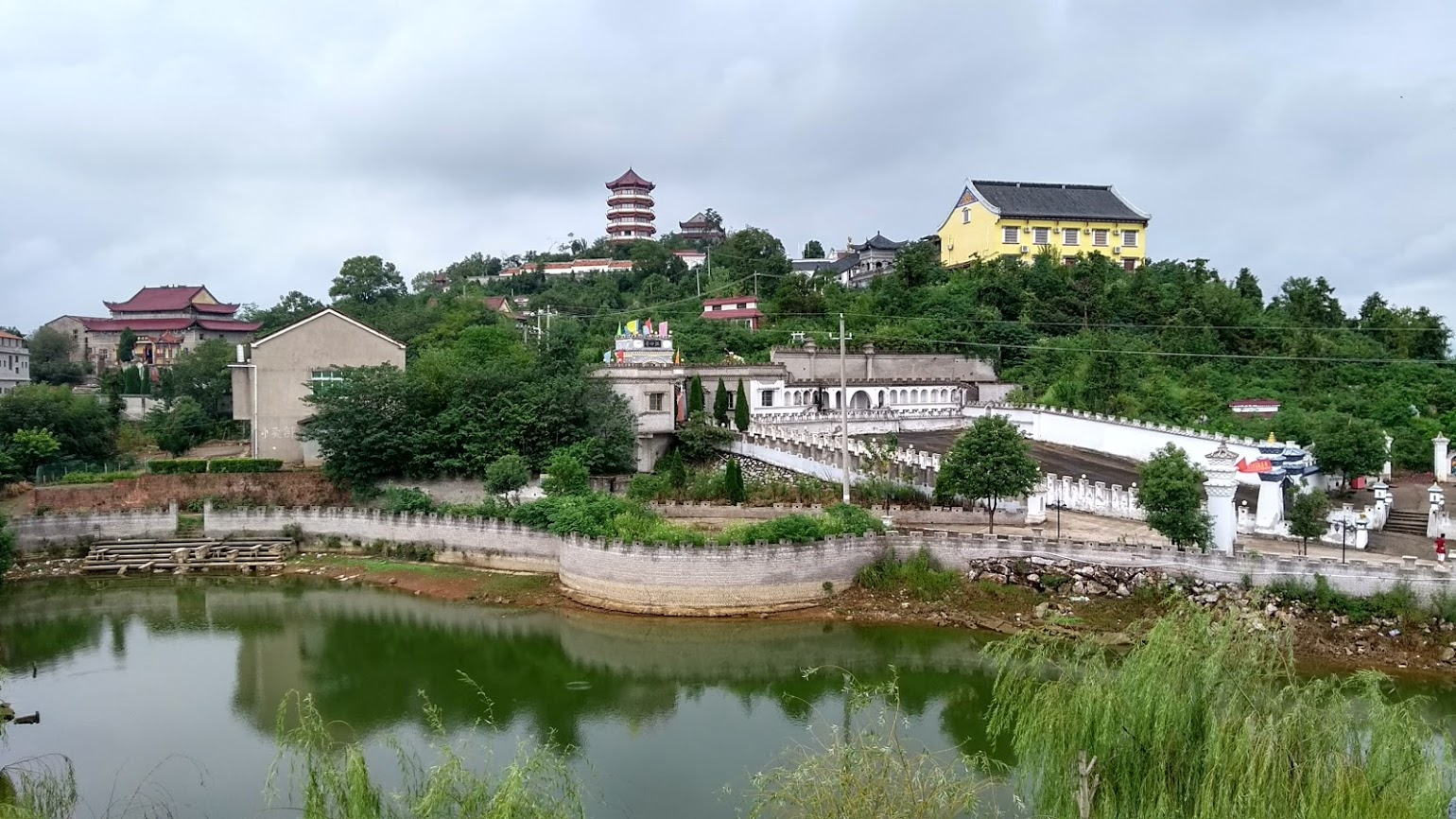
- Caishan

- Location in Hubei
- Coordinates: 29°53′0″N 115°47′24″E
- Country: People's Republic of China
- Province: Hubei
- Prefecture-level city: Huanggang
- County: Huangmei County
- Time zone: UTC+8 (China Standard)

Caishan (Chinese: 蔡山; pinyin: Càishān) is a town under the administration of Huangmei County, Hubei, China. As of 2020, it administers Caiyun Residential Community (蔡运社区) and the following 54 villages:

- Caishan Village
- Hushibo Village (胡世柏村)
- Husifang Village (胡四房村)
- Huxiawu Village (胡下屋村)
- Zhulinwo Village (竹林窝村)
- Gaoshidun Village (高仕墩村)
- Huangxi Village (黄锡村)
- Zhulin Village (竹林村)
- Liuji Village (刘寄村)
- Zhangxing Village (章兴村)
- Caoba Village (曹坝村)
- Zhoushangwu Village (周上屋村)
- Zhangba Village (张坝村)
- Liying Village (李英村)
- Bahaojiao Village (八号脚村)
- Miaowan Village (庙塆村)
- Yihaozhou Village (一号洲村)
- Zhangwan Village (张塆村)
- Shangxindun Village (上新墩村)
- Xiaxindun Village (下新墩村)
- Erhaozhou Village (二号洲村)
- Hujiadun Village (胡家墩村)
- Xuyuetang Village (许月塘村)
- Wangdunzhai Village (王墩寨村)
- Xiangjiaqiao Village (项家桥村)
- Meixuetang Village (梅学堂村)
- Xujiawan Village (许家塆村)
- Wangtaiming Village (王太明村)
- Hujiaqiao Village (胡家桥村)
- Tuxiu Village (涂秀二村)
- Huangnitang Village (黄泥塘村)
- Meitailiu Village (梅太六村)
- Meiwu'er Village (梅勿二村)
- Chenjiadun Village (陈家墩村)
- Chenhao Village (陈壕村)
- Wangsandun Village (王三墩村)
- Niefujun Village (聂福俊村)
- Liliufang Village (李六房村)
- Sigualü Village (丝瓜垏村)
- Liuhu Village (刘湖村)
- Yangshiying Village (杨世英村)
- Dongbao Village (东保村)
- Zhouyingxiang Village (周应祥村)
- Shujiabu Village (舒家埠村)
- Wangshangwu Village (王上屋村)
- Jimadun Village (绩麻墩村)
- Meijidi Village (梅济堤村)
- Feidadun Village (费大墩村)
- Lanqiao Village (兰桥村)
- Tianbao Village (田宝村)
- Zhangwanggui Village (张王桂村)
- Hujiaoxia Village (湖脚下村)
- Wang'erfang Village (王二房村)
- Baishendun Village (白神墩村)
