= Conquest of the Duan =

Campaign against the Duan tribe by the Later Zhao and Former Yan (338)

- Part of the Sixteen Kingdoms period
Date	January – April 338
Location	Northeastern Hebei
Result	Yan and Zhao victory; Fall of the Duan

Belligerents
Later Zhao; Former Yan	Duan

Commanders and leaders
Shi Hu; Murong Huang	Duan Liao

Strength
100,000+ (Later Zhao)	Unknown

Casualties and losses
Unknown	Unknown

The conquest of the Duan was a joint campaign by the alliance of Later Zhao and Former Yan against the Duan-Liaoxi duchy from January to April 338. The campaign ended in victory for the alliance and destruction of the Duan tribe's power in the northeast. However, after the campaign, the Zhao and Yan alliance immediately broke down, leading to the subsequent Battle of Jicheng.

== Background ==
During the fall of Western Jin, the Duan-Xianbei tribe of Liaoxi acted as auxiliaries for the Jin and were bestowed a ducal fief over their home commandery. As the war went on and the Jin imperial family relocated to the south, the Duan shifted their allegiances to the warlord, Shi Le and then his state of Later Zhao. When the Zhao unified most of northern China by 330, the Duan remained one of the few forces in the north to retain their independence over their territory. For a time, the Zhao tolerated their autonomy, but during the reign of Shi Hu, the Duan launched several raids onto their territory.

Despite their marriage alliance, the Duan was at constant odds with the Murong-Xianbei tribe in Liaodong. When civil war broke out among the Murong, their chieftain, Duan Liao sided with Murong Ren against his eldest brother, Murong Huang. Even after Huang won the war and reunified his territory, the Duan remained hostile towards their rule, but was unable to gain the upper hand. In 337, Murong Huang declared himself the Prince of Yan and embarked on a venture to conquer his neighbouring rivals and compete with the Later Zhao. That same year, he sent envoys to Shi Hu offering his submission and a request to launch a joint campaign against the Duan. Shi Hu agreed, and they secretly set a date for the following year to carry out their campaign.

== The campaign ==
=== Zhao preparations ===
In January or February 338, Murong Huang sent his commandant to enquire on upcoming campaign. While Shi Hu was recruiting 30,000 soldiers for the campaign, Duan Liao sent Duan Quyun (段屈雲) to raid Zhao in You province, causing the provincial inspector, Li Meng (李孟) to retreat to Yijing (易京; northwest of present-day Xiong County, Hebei). Once the preparations were complete, Shi Hu attacked Duan Liao by sending 100,000 soldiers led by Tao Bao and Wang Hua (王華) via boat from Piaoyu Crossing (漂渝津, around present-day Cangzhou, Hebei) and another 70,000 vanguard soldiers by foot under Zhi Xiong and Yao Yizhong.

=== Yan raids and defeat of the main Duan army ===
Murong Huang's commandant returned to his capital, Jicheng (棘城, in modern Jinzhou, Liaoning) in March or April, after which he led his soldiers to plunder the Duan cities north of their capital, Lingzhi (令支, in present-day Qian'an, Hebei). Duan Liao wanted to set out and fight Murong Huang. Murong Han, a half-brother of Murong Huang serving under the Duan, warned Duan Liao not to underestimate the Yan and that he should concentrate their forces to oppose the larger Zhao army in the south instead. However, Liao's brother, Duan Lan angrily accused him of colluding with his family, and led their entire army out for battle.

When Duan Lan found the Yan forces, he pursued them but was led into an ambush. The Duan were greatly routed and thousands of their soldiers were killed. Murong Huang returned to Yan with 5,000 households and tens of thousands of livestock from Liaoxi.

=== Fall of Lingzhi ===
On the southern front, Shi Hu also went out to campaign and camped at Jintai (金台; west of present-day Dingxing County, Hebei). Zhi Xiong's forces undertook a long march and occupied the city of Ji, prompting the Duan Administrators and Chancellors in Yuyang, Shanggu and Dai commanderies to surrender. All in all, more than forty cities were captured by the Zhao. The Duan Chancellor of Beiping, Yang Yu brought several thousand families from his territory to defend themselves atop Mount Yan (燕山; in present-day Jizhou, Tianjin). Many of the Zhao generals wanted to attack him, fearing that he would attack their rear if they continued to advance. However, Shi Hu was certain that Yang Yu had no intention to attack, so the Zhao army ignored him and made their way to Xuwu (徐無; west of present-day Zunhua, Hebei).

With the main army already defeated, Duan Liao had no means to repel the invaders. Thus, he and his family brought more than a thousand families with them to flee from Lingzhi to Mount Miyun (密雲山; in present-day Miyun District, Beijing), while Murong Han fled to the Yuwen tribe. The Duan officials, Liu Qun, Lu Chen and Cui Yue, all surrendered and opened the state granaries for the Zhao. Shi Hu sent his generals, Ma Qiu and Guo Tai (郭太) to chase after Duan Liao, and they caught up with him at Mount Miyun, where they killed 3,000 of his families and captured his wife and mother. He fled alone on horseback to hide among the rough terrains, where he then sent his son, Duan Qitizhen (段乞特真) with a prized steed to offer their submission to Zhao. Shi Hu accepted him and entered the palace at Lingzhi as Yang Yu also came from Mount Yan to surrender.

== Aftermath ==
=== Battle of Jicheng ===
Now that he and his forces were at Lingzhi, Shi Hu was angry that Murong Huang did not join up with his soldiers and left early once he finished his raids. Under this pretext, he brought 100,000 soldiers to attack Murong Huang's capital at Jicheng in hopes of subjugating the Murong as well. The Yan were outnumbered, but as the Zhao forces had come a long way and were low on supplies, they successfully repelled the defenders and greatly routed them as they retreat. They capitalized on their victory by seizing Zhao's newly captured territory as far while Shi Hu returned defeated.

=== Surrender of the Duan ===
In January 339, Duan Liao sent a messenger from Mount Miyun giving himself up to Shi Hu, but as he did, he regretted his decision and sent another messenger to Murong Huang. Shi Hu sent 30,000 soldiers under Ma Qiu to claim him, with Yang Yu accompanying him. On the Yan side, Murong Huang went to personally meet with Duan Liao, and the two Xianbei agreed to attack the incoming Zhao army. With 7,000 elite cavalry, Murong Huang's son, Murong Ke laid a trap at Mount Miyun. He defeated Ma Qiu at Sanzangkou (三藏口; in present-day Chengde, Hebei), killing sixty to seventy percent of his soldiers and capturing Yang Yu.

The Duan tribe was thus destroyed and their forces were absorbed by the Yan and Zhao. Later that year, Duan Liao attempted to rebel, but he and his partisans were killed, and his head was sent to Zhao. Despite the loss of Liaoxi, the Duan remained influential among the Murong states and in Zhao. A number of women in the clan married into the Murong, becoming princesses and empresses, while Duan Liao's brother, Duan Lan fled to Zhao and became a military general. During the Ran Min disturbance, Lan's son, Duan Kan, established the state of Duan Qi (350–356), while his cousin, Duan Qin founded his own short-lived state of Zhao in 352, perishing that same year.

== Sources ==
- Lü, Simian (1948), A History of Jin, Northern and Southern Dynasties 两晋南北朝史, vol. 1, Shanghai: Kaiming Press
- Schreiber, Gerhard (1949), "THE HISTORY OF THE FORMER YEN DYNASTY 前 燕 (285-370)", Monumenta Serica, 14, JSTOR: 374–480, doi:10.1080/02549948.1949.11730940, JSTOR 40725508
- Schreiber, Gerhard (1956), "The History of the Former Yen Dynasty 前燕 (285–370) PART II. Continued from Monumenia Sercia, Vol. XIV., pp. 374–480", Monumenta Serica, 15 (1): 1–141, doi:10.1080/02549948.1956.11730946
- Schreiber, Gerhard (1956), "The History of the Former Yen Dynasty 前燕 (285–370): PART II". Continued from Monumenia Sercia, Vol. XIV., pp. 374–480." Monumenta Serica, 15(1), 1–141. https://doi.org/10.1080/02549948.1956.11730946
- Book of Jin
- Zizhi Tongjian
