= Conquest of the Yuwen =

- Part of the Sixteen Kingdoms period
Date	February or March 344 (or 345)
Location	Liaoning
Result	Yan victory; Fall of the Yuwen

Belligerents
Former Yan	Yuwen

Commanders and leaders
Murong Huang	Yuwen Yidougui

Strength
Unknown	Unknown

Casualties and losses
Unknown	Unknown

The conquest of the Yuwen was a military campaign launched by the state of Former Yan against the Yuwen tribe in February or March 344 (or 345). It was the penultimate campaign in Murong Huang's conquests in the northeast, which concluded in victory for the Yan and the fall of the Yuwen tribe.

== Background ==
In the late 3rd and early 4th century, the Yuwen tribe was one of the three major Xianbei tribes that resided around Liaodong, the other being the Duan and Murong. They were particularly at odds with the Murong and launched several attacks onto their territory, though were often defeated. When civil war broke out between Murong Ren and Murong Huang in 333, their chieftain, Yuwen Yidougui sided with the former and continued hostilities with Huang even after Ren's defeat in 336.

In 338, the Yuwen received the surrender of Murong Huang's half-brother, Murong Han. Han once inflicted them one of their biggest defeats, but as he posed a threat to his brother's succession, he first fled to the Duan and now to the Yuwen for safety. He was initially welcomed by Yidougui, but further suspicions from the Yuwen finally drove him to return to Murong Huang in 340.

By this point, Murong Huang had declared himself the Prince of (Former) Yan and was carrying out his ambitions to conquer his neighbouring rivals, as he did with the Duan in 338. After thwarting the Later Zhao's invasions by 341, Murong Huang set his sights on subjugating the Yuwen and Goguryeo. Due to Murong Han's experience in the Yuwen's territory, Huang consulted him on who he should attack first. Han stated that the Yuwen were too dependent on their defences that they would not attack even if Huang was away in Goguryeo. Following his advice, Huang invaded Goguryeo in 342 and forced them into submission. In February or March 343, Yidougui sent his general, Moqian Hun (莫淺渾) to attack Yan, but was greatly defeated as all of his soldiers were captured while Moqian Hun barely escaped with his life.

== The campaign ==
In February or March 344 (345 according to the Book of Wei), Murong Huang was finally ready to conquer the Yuwen. He sought advice from his official, Gao Xu, who agreed that he should launch the campaign to curb the growing Yuwen threat, but also warned that the campaign will be dangerous, even to their generals. Therefore, Murong Huang set out with his army, employing Murong Han as his vanguard general and Liu Pei (劉佩) as his adjutant. He further divided his army among his brother, Murong Jūn, his sons, Murong Ke and Murong Ba, and his general Muyu Gen. They advanced into the Yuwen's domain through three separate routes.

Meanwhile, Yidougui dispatched the Chief of Nanluo, Yuwen Sheyegan (宇文涉夜干) with three armies consisting of his best soldiers to repel the invaders. As they were allies, the Later Zhao also sent their generals, Bai Sheng (白勝) and Wang Ba (王霸) from Gansong (甘松; in present-day Taibus Banner, Inner Mongolia) as reinforcements. Huang sent a messenger to warn Han about Sheyegan's military prowess, but he replied that he knew from his time among the Yuwen that Sheyegan's reputation was a farce, and that if he could destroy the main Yuwen army under him, then the rest of the state would collapse.

Thus, Murong Han marched forward and fought Sheyegan in battle. As they were fighting, Murong Ba suddenly appeared and attacked Sheyegan's flank. Sheyegan was killed, and when his soldiers saw that he was dead, his army crumbled and scattered. The Yan soldiers chased after the fleeing Yuwen troops to their capital of Zimengchuan (紫蒙川, in present-day Chifeng, Inner Mongolia). Yidougui managed to escape the city and fled to the northern desert. During the fighting, however, Gao Xu and Liu Pei were killed by stray arrows, and Murong Han was also injured by an arrow.

== Aftermath ==
Murong Huang annexed the Yuwen's domain, claiming their livestock and treasures as well as relocating more than 5,000 tribes from their territory to Changli in Yan. Sheyegan's city of Nanluo (南羅) was also renamed to Weide (威德; also northwest of Chaoyang), where Huang garrisoned his brother, Murong Biao (慕容彪). By the time the Zhao troops under Bai Sheng and Wang Ba arrived, they found that the Yuwen had already been defeated, but they decided to push on and attack Weide. When they could not take it, they withdrew, pursued by Murong Biao who defeated them.

The destruction of the Duan and Yuwen tribes along with the submission of the Goguryeo established the Former Yan's hegemony over northeastern China. In 346, Murong Huang sent his sons on a final campaign to Buyeo, capturing their king, Hyeon and destroying the state. Though Huang would die of illness in 348, his campaigns laid the groundwork for his son, Murong Jun to break through and conquer the Central Plains following the collapse of the Later Zhao in northern China.

The dispersion of the Yuwen also had long-lasting effects on Chinese history. After their defeat, the Kumo Xi and Khitan branches of their tribe were said to have fled to the Songmo region in modern Heshigten Banner and Ongniud Banner. Meanwhile, Yidougui's son, Yuwen Ling (宇文陵) surrendered to the Yan and became an official. His descendant was the paramount leader of Western Wei, Yuwen Tai, whose family founded the Northern Zhou dynasty during the Northern and Southern dynasties period.

== Sources ==
- Schreiber, Gerhard (1949), "THE HISTORY OF THE FORMER YEN DYNASTY 前 燕 (285-370)", Monumenta Serica, vol. 14, JSTOR, pp. 374–480
- Twitchett, Denis; Tietze, Klaus-Peter (1994), "The Liao", The Cambridge History of China, Volume 6, Alien Regime and Border States, 907–1368, Cambridge: Cambridge University Press, pp. 43–153
- Book of Jin
- Book of Zhou
- Zizhi Tongjian
