= Battle of Pingguo =

Battle between Murong Huang and Murong Ren (336)

- Part of Sixteen Kingdoms
Date	February 336
Location	Pingguo (in modern day Yingkou, Liaoning)
Result	Murong Huang victory

Belligerents
Murong Huang	Murong Ren

Commanders and leaders
Murong Huang	Murong Ren

Strength
Unknown	Unknown

Casualties and losses
Unknown	Unknown

Battle of Pingguo
- Traditional Chinese: 平郭之戰
- Simplified Chinese: 平郭之战
Transcriptions
Standard Mandarin
- Hanyu Pinyin: Píngguō zhī zhàn

The Battle of Pingguo was fought between the brothers, Murong Huang and Murong Ren, in February 336 during the Sixteen Kingdoms period. The battle concluded in victory for Murong Huang and the capture of Murong Ren, ending the three-year long Murong civil war.

== Background ==
Murong Huang came to power as the Duke of Liaodong in 333 following the death of his father, Murong Hui. As the eldest son of the main wife, Huang had previously been designated by his father as the heir apparent in accordance to the primogeniture rule as part of the Murong clan's transition from a Xianbei tribe into a Chinese state. However, this newly-established practice was still in dispute, and there were suspicions that Murong Huang's brothers, all of who were distinguished in their own right, would invoke their clan's longstanding tradition of challenging their brother's claim to the chieftaincy.

Murong Huang had long been jealous of his brothers. Not long after his ascension, his eldest half-brother, Murong Han fled to the rival Duan tribe out of fear that he would be killed. His younger biological brothers, Murong Ren and Murong Zhao (慕容昭), also shared this sentiment and plotted to divide their territory into three. When the plot was revealed, Murong Zhao was killed, but Murong Ren occupied Liaodong. Murong Huang lost the support of the Xianbei and other tribes, while the Duan and Yuwen allied themselves with Murong Ren.

Despite this early scare, Huang defeated the Duan and Yuwen on several occasions and was able to recapture the major city of Xiangping and its surrounding counties in 334. Ren retaliated by attacking Xinchang (新昌) later that year, but was defeated, and he did not launch any further campaign as he held fast to his base at Pingguo (平郭; in modern day Yingkou, Liaoning). Huang was also recognized as his father's legitimate successor by the Eastern Jin dynasty in 335, further affirming his position among the Chinese and other Jin vassals.

== The battle ==
All the while, the Bohai Sea was said to have frozen over at least three times, including in early 336. That same month, Murong Huang was planning to campaign against Murong Ren, and his advisor, Gao Xu proposed that they cross the frozen Bohai Sea to surprise attack the enemy. Despite many of his ministers dissuading him, Murong Huang was convinced by Gao Kai's plan and threatened anyone who objects with execution.

On 17 February, Murong Huang, his half-brother, Murong Ping and others set out from Changli to cross the Bohai Sea, marching more than 300 li. They reached Lilinkou (歷林口, west of the lower reaches of the Liaohe River), where they abandoned their baggages to quickly advance towards Pingguo. Murong Ren's scouts only spotted them when they were 7 li away from Pingguo, and after alerting him, he rushed out to give battle. Ren thought that the enemy was only a small raiding party, but was determined to crush them, not wanting a repeat of the previous year when his brother's raiders killed and captured envoys from the Duan and Yuwen near his base. He was unaware that Murong Huang had come with his main army.

Bringing out his whole army, Ren marched northwest of his city to mount his defence. Among the generals leading his armies was Murong Jūn, his brother who initially sided with Murong Huang but was captured when he seized Liaodong in 333. As Huang's army approached, Jūn defected to his side with his soldiers, causing the rest of Ren's army to lose morale and stop marching. Huang then advanced to attack them and won a great victory. Ren tried to flee, but was betrayed and handed over by his personal guards.

== Aftermath ==
Murong Huang forced Murong Ren to commit suicide, while the guards that turned him over were also executed for betraying their masters. With his death, the Murong civil war came to an end as Huang reunified his domain. The following year in 337, he would elevate his title from the Duke of Liaodong to the Prince of Yan (though remained a vassal to the Eastern Jin) and began a series of military campaigns against his neighbouring tribes and states to compete with the Later Zhao dynasty in northern China.

After Murong Ren's defeat, a number of his generals fled to the neighbouring state of Goguryeo. One of these generals was Dong Shou (冬壽), whose tomb can be found in Anak, South Hwanghae, North Korea.

== Sources ==
- Book of Jin
- Zizhi Tongjian
- Lü, Simian (1948), A History of Jin, Northern and Southern Dynasties 两晋南北朝史, vol. 1, Shanghai: Kaiming Press
- Schreiber, Gerhard (1949), "THE HISTORY OF THE FORMER YEN DYNASTY 前 燕 (285-370)", Monumenta Serica, 14, JSTOR: 374–480, doi:10.1080/02549948.1949.11730940, JSTOR 40725508
