= Battle of Jicheng (338) =

Battle between Former Yan and Later Zhao (338)

- Part of the Sixteen Kingdoms period
Date	12 – 16 June 338
Location	Jicheng (in modern day Jinzhou, Liaoning)
Result	Yan victory

Belligerents
Later Zhao	Former Yan

Commanders and leaders
Shi Hu; Shi Min	Murong Huang; Murong Ke

Strength
100,000	Unknown

Casualties and losses
30,000	Unknown

The Battle of Jicheng was fought between the state of Former Yan against the Later Zhao dynasty from 12 to 16 June 338 during the Sixteen Kingdoms period. Following the breakdown of their alliance against the Duan tribe, the battle concluded in victory for the Yan.

== Prelude ==
In January 338, the Former Yan and Later Zhao launched a joint campaign against the Duan-Xianbei tribe of Liaoxi. The campaign concluded in April that same year, with the Zhao annexing all of the Duan's territory while the Yan seized a substantial amount of families and livestocks from their plunders. As the Prince of Yan, Murong Huang was still a vassal at this point, the Eastern Jin court in the south rewarded him by appointing him as Grand General Who Conquers the North.

However, the Heavenly King of Zhao, Shi Hu, who was at the former Duan capital of Lingzhi (令支, in present-day Qian'an, Hebei), was angry that the Yan did not link up with his army and had instead returned home after conducting their raids. With his 100,000 strong army close to their territory, he planned to annex the Yan as well, despite warnings from his astrologist. When Murong Huang heard that Shi Hu was going to attack, he prepared his soldiers for an invasion at his capital, Jicheng (棘城; in present-day Jinzhou, Liaoning). As the invaders heavily outnumbered the Yan, he anxiously consulted his minister, Gao Xu, who encouraged him to keep to his defences and refuse to give battle.

Shi Hu sent his men to persuade the people and tribes of Yan into surrendering. Many Yan officials defected, and more than 36 cities were lost to Zhao. In Jiyang commandery (冀陽; around present-day Lingyuan, Liaoning), the people had the local administrator killed before submitting to Zhao. Yingqiu (營丘; in present-day Shenyang, Liaoning) was one of the few cities that refused to surrender. Meanwhile, the Prefect of Chaoxian, Sun Yong (孫泳) and the Administrator of Lelang, Ju Peng brought their forces over to Jicheng to help in the defence.

== The battle ==
On 12 June, the Zhao army advanced towards Jicheng. Murong Huang considered fleeing the city, but his general, Muyu Gen believed that doing so would only strengthen Zhao's resolve. Seeing that their city was well-defended and supplied, Muyu Gen further stated that they had ample time to wait for an opening or flee if all else fails. Though Huang took his advice, he remained anxious at the prospect of success.

Then, Administrator of Xuantu, Liu Pei (劉佩) volunteered to make a sortie to raise morale within the city. He sallied out with a few hundred strong cavalry and won a small but significant victory, capturing and killing many Zhao soldiers. The defenders were in high spirits, and Murong Huang then looked to his general, Feng Yi for further advice. Feng Yi asserted that Shi Hu had exhausted his state's resources and his soldiers had come a long way; he was certain that once they make camp, there would be infighting among the Zhao army, so all they had to do was wait. Elated by his response, Huang no longer considered surrender.

For the next few days, the Zhao attackers surrounded Jicheng but was met with fierce resistance by the Yan defenders all day and night. On 16 June, the Zhao started to retreat, so Murong Huang sent his son, Murong Ke with 2,000 cavalry to pursue them. Ke reportedly won a resounding victory; more than 30,000 Zhao soldiers were killed or captured, while many of those who escaped had to abandon their armours to do so. Only Shi Hu's adopted grandson, Shi Min (the future Emperor of Ran Wei, Ran Min), kept his army in order and fought back as he retreated.

== Aftermath ==
As Shi Hu withdrew to his capital at Ye, Murong Huang sent out his forces to quell the revolts within his state and seize Zhao's newly-acquired territories as far as Fancheng (凡城, in modern Kazuo County, Liaoning). He rewarded Muyu Gen, Ju Peng and the other loyalists, while many of those who defected were punished by execution. A handful of the defectors were able to escape to either Zhao or Goguryeo. In the following months, the Yan inflicted further defeats against Zhao around Liaoxi.

In September or October 339, Shi Hu sent his generals, Li Nong and Zhang Ju with 30,000 soldiers to attack Yan at Fancheng. In response, Murong Huang dispatched the City Chief of Kehu, Yue Wan to defend Fancheng with only a thousand soldiers. When the Zhao army arrived, many of the officials at Fancheng wanted to flee the city, but Yue Wan lifted their spirits and convinced them to stay. Yue Wan personally fought among the defenders, and after more than ten days, the Zhao was unable to take the city and withdrew.

In the winter of 340, Shi Hu organized another large-scale invasion against Yan, using Le'an (樂安; northeast of present-day Laoting County, Hebei) as his base of operation. As he concentrated his forces and resources to Le'an, Murong Huang inferred that he had left the key city of Ji lightly guarded, so he led his army to carry out a surprise attack. The Inspector of You province, Shi Guang (石光) gathered the provincial soldiers and shut himself in Ji out of fear, allowing the Yan to reach as far as Gaoyang. There, they burnt Shi Hu's provisions before leaving with more than 30,000 households. The invasion was thus cancelled; though there were a few clashes between their forces in the following years, Shi Hu did not invade Yan for the remainder of his reign.

The victories over the Duan and Later Zhao elevated Murong Huang's reputation to new heights. He used his success to pressure the Jin court into formally recognizing his title of Prince of Yan in 341, and with the Zhao threat neutralized, he was now able to direct his forces in subjugating Goguryeo, the Yuwen and Buyeo.

== Sources ==
- Lü, Simian (1948), A History of Jin, Northern and Southern Dynasties 两晋南北朝史, vol. 1, Shanghai: Kaiming Press
- Schreiber, Gerhard (1949), "THE HISTORY OF THE FORMER YEN DYNASTY 前 燕 (285-370)", Monumenta Serica, 14, JSTOR: 374–480, doi:10.1080/02549948.1949.11730940, JSTOR 40725508
- Book of Jin
- Zizhi Tongjian
