= Yuwen Yidougui =

Chieftain of the Yuwen-Xianbei tribe

Yuwen Yidougui (宇文逸豆歸) (fl. 333–345), also known as Yuwen Houdougui (宇文俟豆歸), was a chieftain of the Yuwen-Xianbei tribe during the Sixteen Kingdoms period. He was the last chieftain of the tribe before they were conquered by the Murong state of Former Yan. Throughout his rule, Yidougui was in conflict with the Duke of Liaodong and later Prince of Yan, Murong Huang. He was defeated in the end, and the Yuwen clan's autonomy was abolished as Murong Huang absorbed their whole territory into his. Yidougui was the direct ancestor of Yuwen Tai, the paramount leader of Western Wei who laid the foundation of the Yuwen-led Northern Zhou state during the Northern and Southern dynasties period.

== Life ==
=== Early reign ===
According to the Book of Zhou, Yuwen Yidougui was supposedly the ninth descendant of Yuwen Mona (宇文莫那). He was initially the chieftain of the eastern Yuwen tribe. In 333, Yuwen Qidegui, the head chief of the clan, was driven out (or killed) by Yidougui, who then made himself the new chieftain. This caused the Duke of Liaodong, Murong Huang to lead his soldiers and attack Yidougui. Yidougui was alarmed by this, so he quickly sought for peace. Huang accepted it, but before leaving, he built two forts named Anjin (安晉) and Yuyin (榆陰) between his and Yidougui's territory.

In November of that year, Huang's brother, Murong Ren, rebelled and seized Liaodong from him, dividing the Murong clan's territory into two. Shortly after Ren's success, Yidougui, as well as other Xianbei chieftains, most prominently Duan Liao of the Duan tribe, gave their support for Ren against Huang. In 335, Murong Huang's Marshal of the Right, Feng Yi, surprise attacked one of the Yuwen leaders, Yuwen Sheyi (宇文涉奕). Many of Sheyi's soldiers were captured, and when Sheyi led his light cavalry to pursue Feng Yi, he was once again defeated at the Hun River. Later that year in December, Yuwen Yidougui, as well as Duan Liao, sent their envoys to meet with Murong Ren. The envoys stayed overnight outside the city, where they were ambushed by Murong Huang's general Zhang Ying (張英). Ten of Yidougui's men were killed while Duan Liao's envoys were all captured and brought to Murong Huang.

Murong Ren was killed by Murong Huang in early 336. Shortly after Ren's death, the Duan and Yuwen led a joint attack against Huang. Duan Liao's brother, Duan Lan, led his army to camp west of Liucheng while Yidougui attacked Anjin to support him. Huang marched to Liucheng (柳城; southwest of present-day Chaoyang, Liaoning), causing Duan Lan to retreat without a fight, and Yidougui would do the same after Huang arrived at Anjin. Huang sent Feng Yi to pursue them with his light cavalry, and Feng inflicted them a great defeat, seizing much of their equipment and ration. Afterwards that same year, Feng Yi led a successful campaign against the Yuwen tribe.

=== Middle reign ===
In 338, Murong Huang, now Prince of his established state, Former Yan, and Shi Hu of Later Zhao agreed to hold a joint campaign to subjugate the Duan tribe. When the Duan's demise was clear, Duan Liao's general and Murong Huang's half-brother, Murong Han decided to flee north to receive protection from the Yuwen tribe. Yidougui accepted him initially but became jealous of Han's talents and reputation. Knowing this, Han pretended to go mad, which he did so convincingly enough to cause the Yuwen to hate him but also underestimate him and not monitor his activities.

During Murong Han's stay with the Yuwens, there was communication between Murong Huang and him through Huang's agent, the merchant Wang Che (王車). Huang hoped to convince his brother to return, and Han expressed his desire to go back home. Huang welcomed him back, and Han began planning his escape with Wang Che. In February 340, Han stole Yidougui's prized horse and made his way to his brother's state. Yidougui responded by sending 100 riders to chase after Han, but Han managed to persuade the riders to let him go.

=== Late reign and fall of the Yuwen state ===
In February 343, Yidougui sent his Chancellor of State Moqian Hun (莫淺渾) to attack Yan. Many of Murong Huang's generals wanted to fight him, but Huang ordered them to wait. Moqian Hun thought that Huang was afraid to face him, so he did not prepare any defences and instead spent his time drinking and hunting. Huang sent Murong Han to attack Hun, who was badly routed. Moqian Hun barely escaped with his life while all his troops were captured by Han. Later that year, Yidougui arrested Duan Lan, who had been on the run since the Duan state's destruction. As tribute to Zhao, Yidougui handed Duan Lan over to Shi Hu along with 10,000 fine horses.

In 344 (or 345 according to the Book of Wei), Murong Huang set out to conquer the Yuwen tribe once and for all. As the Yan soldiers approached his territory, Yidougui sent out his strongest general, the Chief of Nanluo, Yuwen Sheyegan (宇文涉夜干), with many of their best soldiers to fight. Sheyegan fought Murong Han head on but a sudden attack by Murong Ba from the flank was enough to overwhelm and kill him. His death caused many of the Yuwen soldiers to lose heart and abandon their ranks. The Yan forces pressed on and chased after the fleeing Yuwen troops into their capital in Zimengchuan (紫蒙川, in present-day Chifeng, Inner Mongolia). Yidougui managed to flee the city, running away to the northern desert and later moving to Goguryeo where he would remain for the rest of his life. The Yuwen tribe's territory was absorbed into Yan, thus ending the clan's tribal state.

== Descendants ==
Yuwen Yidougui had at least six sons. They were Yuwen Ling (宇文陵), Yuwen Babagui (宇文拔拔瓌), Yuwen Hewei (宇文紇闍), Yuwen Muyuan (宇文目原), Yuwen Heduqizhi (宇文紇闍俟直) and Yuwen Muchen (宇文目陳). After Yidougui's defeat, the tribe dispersed. Members of the Yuwen tribe either followed Yidougui to Goguryeo or surrendered to Yan while the Kumo Xi and Khitan branch of the tribe fled to the Songmo region in modern Heshigten Banner and Ongniud Banner. Yuwen Ling surrendered and had a notable career in Former Yan as well as in its revival state, Later Yan. He served as Chief Commandant of Escorting Cavalry and was bestowed the title of Duke of Xuantu Commandery. He later worked under Northern Wei, where his descendants would live for generations. Yidougui was a direct ancestor of the Western Wei paramount leader, Yuwen Tai, as well as Tai's other family members who would go on to establish their state of Northern Zhou in 557.

Yuwen Yidougui Yuwen Born: ? Died: ?
Regnal titles
| Preceded by Yuwen Qidegui | Chieftain of the Yuwen; 333–344 or 345 | Tribe ended |
