= Feng Yi (Former Yan) =

Former Yan general and chancellor (died 365)

- 封奕/封弈

Marshal of the Left (左司馬)
- In office 335 – ?
- Monarch: Murong Huang

Chief Clerk Of The Left to the Grand General Who Guards The Army (鎮軍左長史)
- In office ?–?
- Monarch: Murong Huang

Chancellor of State (國相)
- In office 337 – ?
- Monarch: Murong Huang/Murong Jun

General of the Five Elements (五材將軍)
- In office ?–?
- Monarch: Murong Jun

Administrator of Hejian (河間太守)
- In office 350 – ?
- Monarch: Murong Jun

Grand Commandant (太尉)
- In office 353 – 365
- Monarch: Murong Jun/Murong Wei

Personal details
- Born: Unknown Hengshui, Hebei
- Died: 365
- Relations: Feng Shi (grandfather); Feng Yu (cousin); Feng Fang (brother or cousin); Feng Fu (nephew)
- Children: Feng Qi; Feng Quàn
- Parent: Feng Quān (father)
- Courtesy name: Zizhuan (子專)
- Peerage: Duke of Wuping (武平公)
- Posthumous name: Duke Kuang (匡公)

Feng Yi (Note: not to be confused with his cousin's son who has a similar-sounding name (封懿), whose courtesy name was Chude (处德). Feng Chude has a biography in vol.32 of Book of Wei, which indicated that his father was Feng Fang (封放); the volume also listed some of Feng Zizhuan's descendants. Part 2 of vol.71 of New Book of Tang recorded that Feng Zizhuan was a brother of Feng Fang; Feng Chude was not mentioned. The New Book of Tang also recorded that prominent members of the clan included Feng Deyi. Vol.99 of Zizhi Tongjian recorded that Feng Fang was a cousin of Feng Zizhuan.) (died 365), courtesy name Zizhuan, was a Chinese official of the Former Yan dynasty during the Sixteen Kingdoms period.

After his grandfather introduced him to Murong Hui in 310, Feng Yi would go on to be one of the few officials to serve four generations of Murong Hui's lineage. Feng distinguished himself during Murong Huang's tenure as Duke of Liaodong, consecutively defeating the rival Duan and Yuwen Xianbei clans, and later participating in the Former Yan–Ran Wei War, in which he conquered the Bohai Commandery and helped capture Ran Min. For his accomplishments, he was given the important positions of Chancellor of the State and subsequently Grand Commandant before dying in 365.

== Service under Murong Hui ==
Feng Yi's family originated from Tiao County (蓨縣, in modern Hengshui, Hebei) in Bohai Commandery. His father was Feng Quan (封悛), and his grandfather was Feng Shi (封釋); both served as Jin officials. Feng Shi fell ill in 310, so he sent Feng Yi to meet the Grand Chanyu of the Xianbei, Murong Hui. Murong Hui was a rising power in Liaodong but also a loyal vassal of Jin. Hui was very impressed by Feng Yi through a conversation between the two and made Feng Yi a minor commander under him.

In 313, Feng Yi and his cousin Feng Yu (封裕) (Note: The Zizhi Tongjian recorded that Feng Yu's father was Feng Chou.) were one of the few people that Murong Hui entrusted in handling confidential affairs. Murong Hui also made Feng Yi an Army Libationer, and Feng would remain in these roles for more than 20 years.

== Service under Murong Huang ==
Murong Hui died in 333 and was succeeded by his heir Murong Huang. Shortly after, Huang's younger brothers, Murong Zhao (慕容昭) and Murong Ren rebelled against him. After killing Zhao, Huang ordered Feng Yi to march to Liaodong to pacify the region. However, the other generals that Huang sent to defeat Ren were either captured, defeated, or surrendered to him. The official, Sun Ji (孫機) also ceded Xiangping (襄平, in modern Liaoyang, Liaoning) over to Ren. Feng Yi was unable to enter the region, so he retreated while Ren consolidated control over the peninsula.

=== Battles with the Duan and Yuwen clan ===
The following year in 334, Feng Yi campaigned against the Xianbei leader, Mudi (木堤) at Bailang (白狼; near present-day Lingyuan, Liaoning) and killed him. Later that year, the leader of the Duan tribe, Duan Liao, sent his younger brother Duan Lan to attack Liucheng (柳城; southwest of present-day Chaoyang, Liaoning). Although their army was well-equipped, they were unable to get past Liucheng's defences. Murong Huang sent Murong Han (慕容汗; not to be confused with his more notable brother with a similar-sounding name (慕容翰)) and Feng Yi to reinforce the city. Han made the rash decision to rush into battle, so Feng Yi advised him to stop, but Han ignored him. As a result, Han was badly defeated by Duan Lan at Niuwei Valley (牛尾谷; north of Liucheng). However, Feng Yi was able to maintain a solid formation and minimize his own losses.

In 335, Feng Yi was made Murong Huang's Marshal of the Right. He was then sent to surprise attack one of the Yuwen tribe's leader, Yuwen Sheyi (宇文涉奕). Feng Yi captured many of Sheyi's soldiers before returning. Sheyi responded by sending his light cavalry against Feng Yi, but Feng defeated them at the Hun River.

Despite his early setbacks, Murong Huang was able to defeat and execute Murong Ren in early 336. However, he was still in conflict with the Duan and Yuwen tribes. In the summer of that year, Duan Lan marched his troops once more to Liucheng while the Yuwen chieftain, Yuwen Yidougui attacked Anjin (安晉) to support him. Huang marched to Liucheng and then to Anjin, and in both cases, the enemies retreated without a fight. Feng Yi pursued and heavily routed them while seizing their equipment and grains. Huang suspected that his enemies were not content with their results and would return soon, so he had Feng Yi prepare an ambush at Mount Madou (馬兜山) in Liucheng. Surely enough, Duan Liao led his troops to attack Liucheng again but Feng Yi ambushed him from two sides and defeated him, even killing his general Rong Bobao (榮伯保).

Soon, Feng Yi launched a successful campaign against the Yuwen tribe. In 337, Murong Huang made Feng Yi his Chief Clerk. In November, Feng Yi and a number of ministers pushed Murong Huang to claim the title of Prince of Yan. Huang agreed, and on the 23 November, he declared himself Prince of Yan, and appointed Feng Yi the Chancellor of the State. Feng was also given the title of Duke of Wuping.

=== Battle of Jicheng ===
In 338, the ruler of Later Zhao, Shi Hu, attacked Yan and placed its capital Jicheng (棘城, in modern Jinzhou, Liaoning) under siege following the breakdown of their alliance against the Duan tribe. Huang was frightened and wanted to flee but was persuaded by his general Muyu Gen not to. He was still unsure of victory, however, so he consulted Feng Yi. Feng told him that Shi Hu would not last long. He pointed out that the campaign had been costly for Shi Hu and that the Zhao army were already worn down due to the long distance that they had travelled. He was confident that strife will grow in a matter of days within Shi Hu's camp, so the best course of action was to wait. Huang was assured by this and remained in Jicheng. After days of fierce fighting, the Zhao soldiers eventually retreated, Huang's son Murong Ke pursued and dealt them a heavy defeat.

== Service under Murong Jun and Murong Wei ==
=== Advice to Murong Jun ===
In 348, Murong Jun inherited the Prince of Yan following the death of Murong Huang. In 349, Later Zhao descended into civil war, which prompted many of Jun's ministers to call for an invasion. Jun was reluctant at first, as he was still in a state of mourning, but his brother Murong Ba, was also insistent on invading Zhao. Murong Jun consulted with Feng Yi over the matter, in which Feng supported the invasion and expressed confidence in Yan's military capability and its ability to win support from the people living in Zhao. After further consultation with Huang Hong (黃泓) and Muyu Gen, Jun was finally convinced. He amassed an army of roughly 200,000 strong and launched his conquest of the Central Plains early the following year. Although Murong Jun had initially sought out against Later Zhao, it became apparent that his real challenge to him would actually be Zhao's break-away state, Ran Wei, which was established by Ran Min right before his invasion.

=== Capturing Bohai ===
After capturing Zhangwu (章武; in modern-day Pingshu, Hebei) and Hejian in 350, Murong Jun appointed Feng Yi to serve as Administrator of Hejian. In September that year, Murong Jun sent Feng Yi and Gao Kai (高開) to subjugate Wei's portion of Bohai commandery, which was defended by its Administrator, Pang Yue (逄約). As natives of Bohai, Feng and Pang had known each other when they were younger. After reaching Pang Yue's fortress, Feng Yi sent a messenger to Pang, stating his interest to converse as old friends. Pang trusted Feng and agreed to the proposal. The two then met outside on horseback and dismissed their escort riders.

After a friendly conversation between the two, Feng revealed his thoughts to Pang, denouncing Wei and praising Yan. Feng offered Pang to switch sides, which left Pang visibly disappointed but unable to respond. Prior to this, Feng Yi had chosen a strong man named Zhang An (張安) as one of his escorts. Following the instructions given to him, as soon as Pang's expression changed, Zhang quickly rushed forward and snatched the reins of Pang Yue's horse. Zhang rode back to Feng Yi's camp with Pang pulled behind him. After Gao Kai arrived at Bohai, Pang's allies, Liu Zhun (劉准) and Feng Fang (封放; a younger cousin or brother of Feng Yi) surrendered without a fight. Because he had fallen for Feng Yi's ploy, Murong Jun renamed Pang Yue to Pang Diao (逄釣, meaning 'fishhook').

=== Fall of Ran Wei ===
On May 17, 352, Feng Yi and Murong Ke attacked Ran Min and fought him at Ran Wei's Changlin Terrace (昌廉臺; west of modern-day Wuji County, Hebei). They defeated and captured him in battle, before sending him to Murong Jun. (Note: Jun later ordered his execution.) In September, Wei's general in Lukou (魯口; in present-day Raoyang County, Hebei), Wang Wu, declared himself King of Anguo, so Feng Yi, Murong Ke and Yang Wu marched against him. They later retreated after Wang Wu handed over Ran Min's son, Ran Cao (冉操) to them. A few days later, Ran Min's successor, his son Ran Zhi, surrendered Ye and himself to Yan, thus ending the Yan-Wei War.

=== Later career and death ===
At the end of 352, Feng Yi, along with 210 Yan officials, presented a petition urging Murong Jun to claim the title of Emperor, which he agreed to. Feng and 55 other officials presented Jun with the imperial seals of office in December, and on 3 January, 353, Murong Jun began handing out imperial offices, making Feng Yi his Grand Commandant. The next day, Murong Jun became Emperor and proclaimed Yan's independence from the Jin dynasty.

In 358, military drafts and levies became increasingly common. Too many ministers and officers were sending their agents out to handle the drafting. The roads and streets were filled with agents, and there was a lot of trouble in trying to accommodate for all of them in counties and commanderies. Because of this, Feng Yi told Murong Jun to stop officials from sending their agents to carry out drafts and levies and instead let the local offices handle these issues. Feng Yi's advice was taken.

Murong Jun's son, Murong Wei, ascended the throne after his father died in 360. Feng continued to serve as Grand Commandant until his death on 15 May 365. He was posthumously named Duke Kuang and his position of Grand Commandant was succeeded by Yang Wu.
