= Yang Wu (Former Yan) =

Former Yan official and regent

- 陽騖/陽鶩

Attendant Officer With Separate Carriage of Pingzhou (平州別駕)
- In office ?–?
- Monarch: ?

Chief Clerk of the Left (左長史)
- In office 333 – ?
- Monarch: Emperor Cheng of Jin/Murong Huang/Murong Jun

Director of Retainers (司隸)
- In office 337 – ?
- Monarch: Murong Huang

Prefect of the Household Gentlemen (郎中令)
- In office 349 – ?
- Monarch: Murong Jun

General Who Upholds Virtue (輔義將軍)
- In office 349 – ?
- Monarch: Murong Jun

Prefect of the Masters of Writing (尚書令)
- In office 353 – ?
- Monarch: Murong Jun

Minister of Works (司空)
- In office 354 – ?
- Monarch: Murong Jun

Grand Guardian (太保)
- In office 360 – ?
- Monarch: Murong Wei

Grand Commandant (太尉)
- In office 365 – 367
- Monarch: Murong Wei

Personal details
- Born: Unknown Ji County, Tianjin
- Died: 367
- Relations: Yang Yu (cousin)
- Children: Yang Yao
- Parents: Yang Dan (father); Lady Li (mother)
- Courtesy name: Shiqiu (士秋)
- Posthumous name: Duke Jing of Jianning (建寧敬公)

Yang Wu (died 367), courtesy name Shiqiu, was an official of the Former Yan dynasty during the Sixteen Kingdoms period of China. Yang was one of the few officials of the Former Yan who served four generations of Murong Hui's family, from Murong Hui himself to his great-grandson, Murong Wei. He was favoured by all four rulers for his upright and reliable character, and the responsibilities that he held were equal to that of Murong Ke. Prior to Murong Jun's death in 360, Yang was among the few chosen people that Murong Jun entrusted to act as regent to his child heir, Murong Wei.

== Life ==
=== Service under Murong Hui ===
Yang Wu was from Wuzhong County (無終; in present-day Ji County, Tianjin) in Youbeiping Commandery. His father, Yang Dan (陽耽), was initially the Administrator of Liaoxi for the Jin dynasty. In 313, Dan was captured in Yangle (陽樂; present-day Yi County, Liaoning) by Murong Han during a joint Murong-Tuoba attack on the Duan clan. Murong Hui treated Yang Dan well after his capture and was able to employ him into his administration.

Since young, Yang Wu was honest and knowledgeable. He, too would serve in Murong Hui's governance, eventually rising to the rank of Attendant Officer With Separate Carriage of Pingzhou (平州, modern eastern Liaoning). During his tenure, Yang Wu helped maintain the peace and develop Murong Hui's territory. He would also offer Murong Hui with sound advice, earning the trust of his superior.

=== Service under Murong Huang ===
Murong Hui died in 333 and was succeeded by his son, Murong Huang. Following his succession, Huang handed out new appointments to his officials. One in particular was Wang Dan (王誕), who he made Chief Clerk of the Left. However, Wang suggested that the position be given to Yang Wu, who was serving as Administrator of Liaodong, due to his abilities. Huang took his advice and gave the position to Yang Wu instead. In 337, after Huang declared himself Prince of Yan, Yang Wu was appointed as Director of Retainers.

Yang Wu participated in all of Huang's campaign, providing him with strategy within his tent wherever they went. When Murong Huang was dying in 348, one of his final advises to his heir, Murong Jun was in regard to Yang Wu. He told him, "Yang Shiqiu is a noble and honest scholar, loyal and unwavering. You may rely on him for great things. Treat him well!"

=== Service under Murong Jun ===
Following his father's death, Murong Jun ascended the throne and made Yang Wu the Prefect of the Household Gentlemen. The following year, Murong Jun decided to capitalize on the civil wars occurring in Later Zhao. As he prepared for his conquest, he appointed his brother, Murong Ke, as the General Who Upholds The State, his uncle, Murong Ping, as the General Who Upholds Assistance and Yang Wu as the General Who Upholds Virtue. These three were called the "Three Upholders" (三輔) due to the fact that all three of them were given titles with the word 'upholders' (輔) in them. During Yan's conquest of the Central Plains, it was said that Yang Wu's achievements were only second to that of Murong Ke's.

By September 352, Later Zhao had been destroyed, and Ran Min (the ruler of Ran Wei, Zhao's breakaway state) was also killed. That month, Yang Wu was sent with Murong Ke and Feng Yi to conquer Lukou (魯口; in present-day Raoyang County, Hebei) from Wang Wu, Ran Min's general who declared himself King of Anguo. Wang prepared the defences and also surrendered Ran Min's son, Ran Cao (冉操) over to the Yan army. With Ran Cao at hand, Yang Wu and the others withdrew, but not before gathering the grains from the fields near Wang Wu's base. Lukou would only be captured in 354 by Murong Ke.

Murong Jun ascended as Emperor on January 3, 353. Jun handed out imperial offices to his officials, with Yang Wu being made Prefect of the Masters of Writing. In 354, Yang Wu was further made Minister of Works, but he also retained his previous office.

In 355, the ruler of Duan Qi, Duan Kan, had angered Murong Jun after Duan denounced his decision to become emperor in a letter. Jun ordered Murong Ke to subdue him, but not before making Yang Wu Ke's adjutant. They defeated Duan Kan in the spring of 357, and Murong Jun subsequently executed him.

In 358, Murong Jun issued a campaign against the semi-independent warlords, Zhang Ping, Li Li (李歷) and Gao Chang (高昌). Yang Wu was tasked in attacking Gao Chang at Dongyan (東燕; in present-day Fengyang, Anhui) but was unable to capture one of Gao Chang's subordinates at Liyang (黎陽; present-day Xun County, Henan). Of the three warlords, Gao Chang was the only one who the Yan forces could not subdue. Meanwhile, Jin's Administrator of Taishan, Zhuge You (諸葛攸), attacked Yan at Dong Commandery and breached into Wuyang. Jun ordered Yang Wu, Murong Ke and Murong Zang (慕容臧) to repel Zhuge You, and so they did. Zhuge You fled back to Taishan while the Yan generals occupied the Jin territory south of the Yellow River.

Murong Jun grew critically ill in the beginning of 360. In spite of that, he was still keen on holding a grand invasion of Jin that year, with Murong Ke and Yang Wu acting as commanders. However, in February, his illness grew worse to the point that he was on the verge of death. Before he died, he ordered Yang Wu to serve as regent to his heir, Murong Wei, who was too young to rule at the time. Others who Jun entrusted were Murong Ke, Murong Ping and Muyu Gen.

=== Service under Murong Wei ===
Following Murong Wei's ascension, Yang Wu was appointed Grand Guardian. Even with Murong Wei, he received personal favour from the young emperor and was shown the same respect as one of the Three Excellencies. In 365, he took over Feng Yi's position as Grand Commandant following Feng's death that year. Yang was reluctant in accepting the office at first, telling Murong Wei, "In the past, Chang Lin and Xu Miao were both famous ministers. Yet, even as the realm parted into three, they refused the positions of the Three Excellencies. Who am I, some fellow of no account, that my virtue is sufficient to be worthy of such an office?" Wei found this an eloquent response, but he still insisted that Yang Wu take the position.

Yang Wu served four generations of the Murong clan up to an old age. Due to his modesty and courtesy, he was able to get the respect of almost everyone including Murong Ke. Yet despite his prestigious position, he successfully stressed to his children and grandchildren to never break the law. Yang Wu died in December 367 and was posthumously honoured as Duke Jing of Jianning (建寧敬公). Yang was very frugal, with accounts stating that he often rode a worn-out carriage pulled by an old horse. By the time he died, he had left no wealth.
