= Duan Liao =

Chieftain of the Duan (325–338)

Duan Liao (段遼) (died 339), also known as Duan Huliao (段護遼), was a Xianbei chieftain of the Duan tribe during the Sixteen Kingdoms period of China. He was the last chieftain of the Duan state before it was conquered in 338. Duan Liao launched a number of attacks against the Duke of Liaodong and later Prince of Former Yan, Murong Huang after civil war erupted between Huang and his brother, Murong Ren. Duan Liao met with repeated failures, and in 338, Murong Huang and Shi Hu of Later Zhao formed an alliance for a joint campaign against the Duans which resulted in the destruction of their state. Duan Liao surrendered to Murong Huang, but later rebelled and was killed in 339. Although the Duan tribe's state was destroyed, they remained an important family throughout the period through their marriages with the Murongs.

== Life ==
=== Becoming chieftain ===
Duan Liao was the grandson of Rilujuan, the accredited founder of the Duan tribe. In 325, his cousin, Duan Ya, became the tribe’s new chieftain. The Duke of Liaodong, Murong Hui, quickly established friendly relations with Duan Ya, even managing to convince Duan Ya to move his capital away from Lingzhi (令支, in present-day Qian'an, Hebei). The decision proved unpopular among his subjects, however, and Duan Liao would use this as pretext to rally the tribes under the Duan clan to overthrow Duan Ya. Duan Ya died in the same year he ascended, and Duan Liao was installed as the new chieftain.

At the time of Duan Liao's coup, the Duan tribe had a territory that stretched from Yuyang Commandery to the Liao River. Sometime between 329 and 335, Duan Liao was made Grand General of Chariots and Cavalry, Inspector of Youzhou, Grand Chanyu, and Duke of Beiping by the Jin dynasty (266–420) court. In 331, he was made General of Agile Cavalry.

=== War with Murong Huang ===
Murong Hui died in 333 and was succeeded by his heir, Murong Huang. Huang was not on good terms with his three brothers, Murong Ren, Murong Han and Murong Zhao (慕容昭). Right after Huang’s succession, Murong Han, concerned for his safety, fled with his two sons to Duan Liao. Duan Liao appreciated Han’s talents and welcomed him. Not long after, Murong Zhao and Murong Ren rebelled against Huang. Although Zhao was killed early on, Ren was able to capture Liaodong and consolidate an independent base. Duan Liao, along with other Xianbei chieftains such as Yuwen Yidougui of the Yuwen tribe, sent envoys to Ren to coordinate attacks against Huang.

Duan Liao first acted against Huang in 334. He sent soldiers to launch a surprise attack on Tuhe (徒河; in present-day Chaoyang, Liaoning), but failed. Then, he sent his brother, Duan Lan, and Murong Han to attack Liucheng (柳城; southwest of present-day Chaoyang, Liaoning). The defenders fought back fiercely, and the two generals retreated after some fighting. Duan Liao reprimanded Duan Lan and forced him to return to Liucheng and capture it at all costs. Duan Lan was once more unsuccessful, but he was able to rout reinforcements led by Murong Han (慕容汗; different character from Murong Han (慕容翰)) and Feng Yi at Niuwei Valley (牛尾谷; north of Liucheng). However, he was unable to follow up on it as Murong Han (慕容翰) withdrew in protest against pursuing them.

In June 336, Duan Liao’s general Li Yong (李詠) attempted to surprise attack Murong Huang but was captured instead. After this, Duan Liao sent Duan Lan to attack Liucheng again. This time, he was supported by Yuwen Yidougui, who helped him by attacking Anjin (安晉). However, the two fled without a fight after Huang arrived at their respective locations and were defeated by Feng Yi who pursued them. Disgruntled, Duan Liao personally commanded an attack on Liucheng, but was routed in an ambush set up by Feng Yi at Mount Madou (馬兜山), where his general, Rong Bobao (榮伯保) was killed in battle. That same year, Murong Huang's son, Murong Jun, successfully led campaigns against Duan Liao's cities.

In March 337, Murong Huang built Haocheng (好城) east of Duan Liao's territory at Yilian (乙連; in present-day Jianchang County, Liaoning) to put pressure on Yilian. The following month, Duan Liao delivered grain carts to supply Yilian to relief a famine, but they were captured by Huang's general Lan Bo (蘭勃). Duan Liao ordered his cousin, Duan Quyun (段屈雲) to launch a night raid at Xingguo (興國; in present-day Harqin Zuoyi Mongol Autonomous County, Liaoning), but Quyun was defeated by Murong Zun (慕容遵). Duan Liao's minister, Yang Yu advised Duan Liao to seek peace with Murong Huang, but Duan Liao refused and sent him away.

=== Fall of Liaoxi ===
Up to this point, Duan Liao had ordered a number of raids on the borders of Later Zhao, much to the annoyance of Heavenly King of Zhao, Shi Hu In 337, shortly after declaring himself the Prince of (Former) Yan, Murong Huang sent a messenger to Shi Hu offering himself as a vassal and requesting a joint campaign against the Duan. Delighted by his submission, Shi Hu agreed and secretly set a date for the following year.

On January 338, realizing that Shi Hu and Murong Huang were about to attack him, Duan Liao struck first by sending Duan Quyun to raid Zhao in Youzhou, where he forced the provincial inspector, Li Meng (李孟) back to Yijing (易京; northwest of present-day Xiong County, Hebei). Shi Hu sent an army of 170,000 strong to invade the Duan by land and water, while Murong Huang raided the cities north of Lingzhi. Duan Liao wanted to the Yan first, but Murong Han warned him not to underestimate their army and that they should focus their troops on repelling the larger Zhao forces in the south. Duan Lan angrily rebuked him, not forgetting his previous actions at Liucheng, and volunteered to defeat the raiders. Duan Lan led the entire army out to face Huang, but they were ambushed and met with heavy casualty.

By the time Murong Huang left, the Zhao soldiers had already captured the commanderies of Yuyang, Shanggu and Dai. With most of his cities gone and his main army defeated, Duan Liao and his followers abandoned Lingzhi and fled to Mount Miyun (密雲山; in present-day Miyun District, Beijing). Before parting ways, he expressed his regret to Murong Han over not following his advice earlier. After he left, Murong Han fled to the Yuwen tribe up north. On his way to Mount Miyun, Duan Liao was pursued by the Zhao generals, Guo Tai (郭太) and Ma Qiu, who captured Duan Liao's wife and mother and killed 3,000 of his followers during the chase. Duan Liao had to escape alone on horseback to the rough terrains. There, he sent his son and a prized steed to Shi Hu to offer his submission, which Shi Hu accepted.

=== Surrender to Former Yan and death ===
Duan Liao remained at Mount Miyun for a few more months. While there, Shi Hu turned on Murong Huang and attacked him at Jicheng (棘城, in modern Jinzhou, Liaoning), albeit with little success. At the end of the year, Duan Liao dispatched envoys to Zhao requesting their assistance. However, he later regretted this decision and asked Yan for help instead. Thus, both Zhao and Yan were heading towards his position. Murong Huang led the army and arrived first at Mount Miyun. Once there, Duan Liao and Huang discussed their plans on how to deal with the Zhao army. Huang had his son, Murong Ke to lay an ambush around the mountain, and the Xianbei allies defeated Ma Qiu at Sanzangkou (三藏口, in present-day Chengde, Hebei). Many of the Zhao soldiers were killed and Yang Yu was captured.

Huang assimilated Duan Liao's troops into his and treated the chieftain with great respect. Despite this treatment, just a year later in 339, Duan Liao rebelled against the state for unspecified reasons. Murong Huang had him and his partisans killed, and later sent his head to Zhao.

Duan Liao Duan Born: ? Died: 339
Regnal titles
Preceded by Duan Ya	Chieftain of the Duan; 325-338	Extinct
