= Cui Bi =

Early 4th century Jin dynasty general

- 崔毖
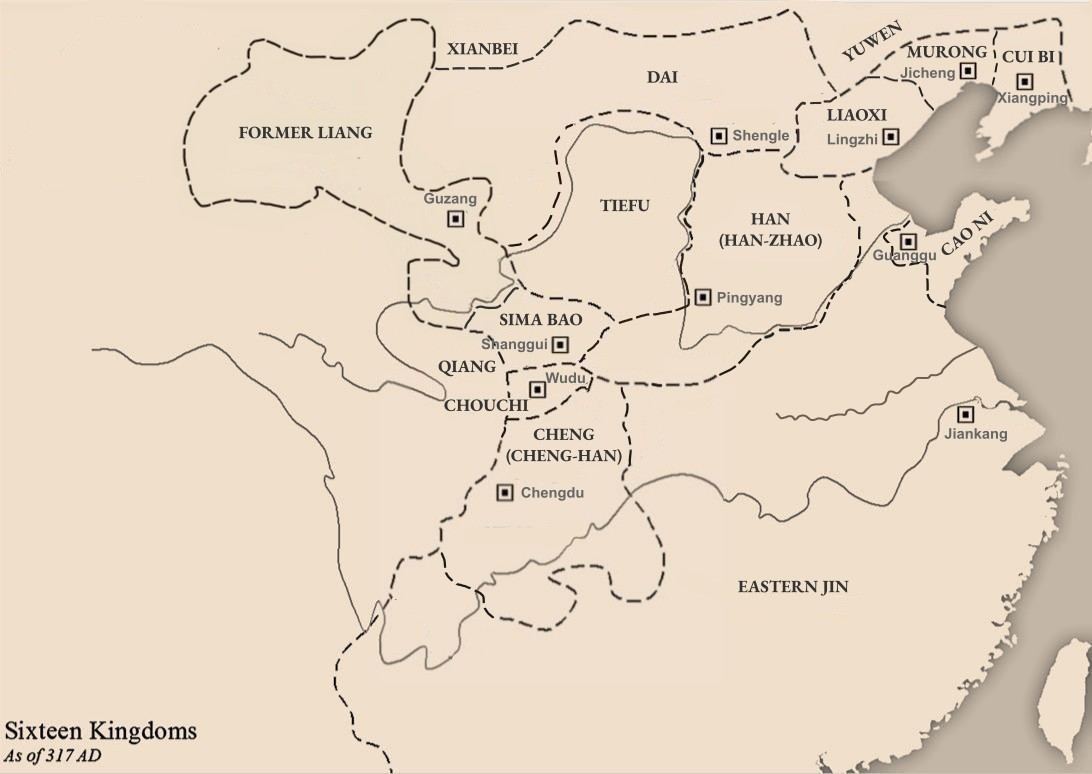
- Cui Bi's territory as of 317 AD

Inspector of Pingzhou 平州刺史
- In office ? – 319

Personal details
- Born: Unknown Gucheng County, Hebei
- Died: Unknown Unknown (Note: Cui Bi's activities after his flight to Goguryeo were unrecorded. Gungnae (in modern-day Ji'an, Jilin) was the capital of Goguryeo. But, there is no evidence suggesting that Cui remained there for the entire duration of his exile.)
- Relations: Cui Yan (great-grandfather); Lady Cui (sister)
- Occupation: Governor

Cui Bi (fl. 311–319) was a military general and politician of the Jin dynasty (266–420). He served as the Inspector of Ping province (平州, modern eastern Liaoning) during the fall of Western Jin. Isolated from the conflict of the Central Plains, Cui Bi had autonomy over eastern Liaodong, where he developed a rivalry with the Xianbei chieftain and Jin vassal, Murong Hui. In 319, he formed an alliance with the Duan and Yuwen tribes along with Goguryeo to destroy Murong Hui, but was defeated and forced to flee to Goguryeo.

== Life ==
Cui Bi was a member of the Cui clan of Qinghe as the great-grandson of the Han dynasty minister, Cui Yan. His sister was married to the Inspector of You province, Wang Jun, who in 311 claimed that he had received imperial assent to hand out offices throughout the empire. Wang Jun stationed Cui Bi at Ping province to serve as the colonel of Eastern Yi tribes after the previous legitimate holder, Feng Shi (封釋; grandfather of the Former Yan minister, Feng Yi) died of illness.

Cui Bi eventually rose to the office of Inspector of Ping province. Due to the ongoing collapse of the Western Jin in northern China, Cui Bi had hoped to welcome the fleeing Han Chinese emigres and refugees from the Central Plains into serving under him. However, many of them instead preferred to join Murong Hui, a Xianbei chieftain and Jin vassal operating to the west of Cui Bi's territory in Liaodong. One example was the official, Huangfu Ji (皇甫岌), who despite much persuasion from Cui Bi to join him, promptly decided to serve Murong Hui upon receiving his summon. Cui Bi often sent agents to Murong Hui's territory to win over the people there, but these agents never returned, causing him to suspect that Murong Hui had caught and detained them.

In 317, Cui Bi was one of the Jin generals in the north to send a petition to the Prince of Langya, Sima Rui (the later Emperor Yuan) at Jiankang urging him to take the imperial throne, although the prince rejected it at the time.

In 319, Cui Bi, no longer able to tolerate Murong Hui's growing power, formed an alliance with the Murong's rival Xianbei tribes, the Duan and Yuwen, as well as the Goguryeo state to destroy him. Cui Bi's aide, Gao Zhan (高瞻) objected to his plan but was ignored. The forces of the three states converged on Murong Hui's capital, Jicheng (棘城, in modern Jinzhou, Liaoning). However, Murong Hui tricked the Duan and Goguryeo into believing that he was colluding with the Yuwen, causing the two of them to withdraw. The Yuwen army that remained were decisively defeated by Murong Hui and his son, Murong Han.

Cui Bi panicked when he heard that the campaign had failed, so he sent his nephew Cui Dao (崔燾) to Jicheng to congratulate Murong Hui on his victory. However, envoys from the Duan, Yuwen and Goguryeo also arrived at Jicheng seeking for peace, and they all revealed Cui Bi's involvement in the attack. Murong Hui showed off his army before Cui Dao, scaring him into submission. He then sent Cui Dao back to his uncle with the message, "Surrender is your best option, fleeing is your worst", while following him from behind with an army. Cui Bi was unable to resist, so he abandoned his family and fled to Goguryeo with a few dozen riders, allowing Murong Hui to annex eastern Liaodong and absorb his followers. (Note: Both Zizhi Tongjian and Samguk Sagi recorded that Cui Bi fled to Goguryeo in the 12th month of the Chinese year 319 (2nd year of the Daxing era of the reign of Emperor Yuan of Jin and the 20th year of Micheon's reign); the month corresponds to 28 Dec 319 to 26 Jan 320 in the Julian calendar.)

Cui Bi's flight to Goguryeo was also recorded in the annals of Micheon of Goguryeo in Samguk sagi.
