= Yangwu =

Yangwu may refer to:

- In Chinese mythology, a three-legged sun crow, see Three-legged crow#Sun crow in Chinese mythology
- Self-Strengthening Movement (c. 1861–1895), also known as Yangwu Movement, institutional reforms during the late Qing dynasty

== Places ==
- Yangwu, Guizhou (扬武), a town in Danzhai County, Guizhou, China
- Yangwu, Yunnan (扬武), a town in Xinping Yi and Dai Autonomous County, Yunnan, China

== See also ==
- Wu (Ten Kingdoms) (902 or 907–937), also known as Yang Wu, a southern Chinese state during the Five Dynasties period, ruled by the House of Yang
- Yang Wu, a Former Yan official and regent during the Sixteen Kingdoms period
