= Yuwen Qidegui =

4th-century Chinese chieftain

Yuwen Qidegui (Chinese: 宇文乞得歸; pinyin: Yǔwén Qǐdeguī) (?–333) was the chieftain of the Yuwen tribe from the early 4th century to 333. He succeeded his father Yuwen Xunniyan as chieftain.

The Later Zhao ruler Shi Le bestowed ranks and titles to Yuwen Qidegui. In 325, Qidegui dispatched troops to assist Shi Le in attacking the Xianbei chieftain Murong Hui. Murong Hui then dispatched his heir apparent Murong Huang along with the Tuoba and the Duan tribes. Murong Hui entered as the right wing, while Murong Ren led the left wing. Qidegui guarded the Xar Moron River. Yuwen Qidegui's nephew Yuwen Xibaxiong resisted Murong Ren. Murong Ren killed Yuwen Xibaxiong, while winning attacks against Yuwen Qidegui with Murong Huang, breaking Yuwen Qidegui's forces. Yuwen Qidegui abandoned his armed force to run away, Murong Huang and Murong Ren entered his territory and sent troops to pursue Yuwen Qidegui. In 333 he was killed by Yuwen Yidougui, who succeeded him as chieftain of the Yuwen.

Yuwen Qidegui Yuwen Born: ? Died: 333
Regnal titles
Preceded by Yuwen Xiduguan	Chieftain of the Yuwen ?–333	Succeeded by Yuwen Yidougui
