= Muyu Gen =

Former Yan general and regent

- 慕輿根

City Chief of Kehu (榼盧城大)
- In office ?–?
- Monarch: Murong Huang

General Who Breaks And Charges (折衝將軍)
- In office ?–?
- Monarch: Murong Huang/Murong Jun

General of the Palace (殿中將軍)
- In office ?–?
- Monarch: Murong Jun

General Who Spreads Might (廣威將軍)
- In office ?–?
- Monarch: Murong Jun

General Who Leads The Army (領軍將軍)
- In office ?–?
- Monarch: Murong Jun

Grand Instructor (太師)
- In office 360 – 360
- Monarch: Murong Wei

Personal details
- Born: Unknown
- Died: 360 Beijing, Beijing Municipality

Muyu Gen (died 360) was a military general and regent of Former Yan during the Sixteen Kingdoms period. He was a main contributor to Murong Huang's victory in the defence of Jicheng (棘城, in modern Jinzhou, Liaoning) in 338 and convinced Murong Jun to carry out his conquest of Later Zhao in 349, which led to Yan's control over the Central Plains. A distinguished veteran, he was chosen by Murong Jun to serve as one of Murong Wei's regents in 360. Although Muyu Gen was brave, he was also jealous and stubborn in nature. He attempted to kill his co-regent Murong Ke by sowing discord between Ke and the emperor, but his schemes were uncovered, and he was executed less than a year into his regency.

== Family ==
Muyu Gen's family, the Muyu clan (慕輿氏), was a Xianbei family that was particularly active during the Sixteen Kingdoms and appear to have close ties with the Murong clan. Many of their members served under Murong-led regimes such as Murong Hui's administration, Former Yan, Later Yan and Southern Yan. According to the Tongzhi, the name 'Muyu' (慕輿) is a corruption of 'Murong' (慕容), and their members were one of the same clan. However, Hu Sanxing's annotation in the Zizhi Tongjian states that the Muyu was a separate branch of the Xianbei and were distinguished from the Murong.

== Service under Murong Huang ==
Muyu Gen was a City Chief of Kehu (榼盧城; east of present-day Funing District, Hebei). He excelled at both riding and archery. Once, he followed Murong Huang during a hunting trip when they saw a goat standing on a tall cliff. Huang ordered his aides to shoot it, but no one was able to land a hit. Finally, Muyu Gen took up his bow and managed to kill it with a single shot. Huang was impressed at his display, and Gen would serve as one of his staff officers.

=== Defence of Jicheng (338) ===
In 338, following a victorious joint campaign against the Duan clan, the ruler of Later Zhao, Shi Hu, turned against Murong Huang and invaded his territory. The Zhao troops were able to arrive at Jicheng in June, causing him to panic. Huang wished to flee, but Muyu Gen remonstrated him, believing that doing so is playing right into Zhao's hands. He also convinced Huang that the city would be strong enough to hold out and that there would be ample time to flee if worst comes to the worst.

Huang took his advice, but was still anxious of defeat. It was not until Liu Pei's (劉佩) successful charges and Feng Yi's encouragement that Huang regained his confidence. The Zhao army encircled the entire city, but Muyu Gen and the others fought back fiercely day and night. The siege lasted for ten days before the Zhao army was ordered to retreat. Once they did, Huang had his son Murong Ke pursue them, and Ke dealt them a heavy defeat. Muyu Gen was rewarded following their victory.

=== Campaigns in Liaoxi and Buyeo (339 and 346) ===
Muyu Gen became General Who Breaks And Charges some time after. In 339, Muyu Gen along with Murong Ping, Murong Jūn and Muyu Ni (慕輿泥) invaded Zhao's dominion in Liaoxi. The generals captured thousands of households before turning back. Zhao in response sent Shi Cheng (石成), Huyan Huang (呼延晃) and Zhang Zhi (張支) to pursue them, but the generals managed to fight them off, even killing Huang and Zhang.

In 346, Muyu Gen commanded one of the armies during Murong Huang's campaign against Buyeo. The campaign was a huge success as they were able to capture King Hyeon (王玄) along with roughly 50,000 households.

== Service under Murong Jun ==
=== Persuading Murong Jun ===
Murong Huang died in October 348 and was succeeded by his son, Murong Jun. In 349, Zhao was thrown into a series of civil wars between Shi Hu's sons. Jun was advised by his officials to take advantage of Zhao's misfortunes, but he was reluctant to do so as he was still in a state of mourning. His brother, Murong Ba, attempted to persuade him into holding an invasion on Zhao, and when Jun asked Feng Yi and Huang Hong (黃泓) for their advice, their opinions aligned with that of Ba's.

At last, he asked Muyu Gen, and Gen said to him, "The people of the Middle Kingdom are entangled in the chaos caused by the Shi clan's. They all long for a change in ruler to save them from impending doom. This opportunity only comes once in a thousand years; we must not waste it. Since the time of Prince Wuxuan (Murong Hui), we have been nurturing the people, cultivating the farms, and training the troops, all to prepare ourselves for this very day. If we do not act, and instead place our concerns elsewhere, then why is Heaven's will not to pacify the evil within this realm? Or is it because Your Highness does not want to win the world?" Jun laughed and agreed with his statement. He immediately began preparations for an invasion, amassing an army of roughly 200,000 strong.

=== Invasion of Later Zhao and Yan-Wei War (350-352) ===
Murong Jun began his conquest in early 350. In May, Murong Jun led his army to attack Lukou (魯口; in present-day Raoyang County, Hebei), which was defended by Zhao's general Deng Heng (鄧恆). Deng's general, Lu Bozao (鹿勃早), carried out a night raid on Jun's camps which caught the Yan troops by surprise, but they were able to regroup and form a defence. Seeing how persistent the enemy was, Jun considered falling back, but Muyu Gen advised against it, stating that the enemy must be weaker than they were if they have to resort to a night raid. After reassuring Jun, Muyu Gen volunteered to lead an attack against Lu Bozao.

Despite that, Jun was still concerned, so his official, Li Hong, escorted him to the top of a high mound. With several hundred strong soldiers, Muyu Gen led them from Jun's camp to the frontlines, spearheading the attack. Li Hong would also join him later in the assault, bringing along a cavalry unit. The two managed to rout the enemy and continued to pursue them after they retreated. Lu Bozao barely escaped with his life, while his remaining soldiers were all killed. After this, Murong Jun led his army back to Ji.

Later Zhao's condition continued to deteriorate, eventually resulting in Ran Min (Shi Hu's adopted grandson) creating his state of Wei in 350 and Zhao's destruction in 351. However, by May 352, Ran Min had been captured (and later executed) by Yan forces while his heir, Ran Zhi, was holed up in his capital in Yecheng. Muyu Gen was sent to assist Murong Ping in taking Yecheng together with Huangfu Zhen and Murong Jūn. The city fell in September 352, and Ran Wei was conquered.

=== Su Lin and Feng Yang rebellions (352 and 358) ===
Near the end of 352, a man from Zhongshan named Su Lin (蘇林) rebelled in Wuji and declared himself the Son of Heaven. Murong Ke, who was campaigning against the warlord Wang Wu in Lukou at the time, marched to Wuji to quell the rebellion. Murong Jun sent Muyu Gen to reinforce Ke, and they were able to kill Su Lin.

In 358, the Yan general in Shangdang, Feng Yang (馮鴦) rebelled against the state. Murong Ping was dispatched to defeat him, but he was unable to get the upper hand, so the court also sent Muyu Gen to serve as reinforcements. After arriving, Muyu Gen told Murong Ping that they should intensify their attack. Ping disagreed initially, stating that Feng's defences were formidable, but Gen argued that the enemy's morale had fallen and are in a disorderly state due to Gen's reinforcements. Ping bought his reasoning, so they pressed on into Feng Yang's city. Gen's prediction turned out to be true, as Feng Yang's men had grown suspicious with each other and refused to work together. Feng fled to Lü Hu in Yewang, while his remaining forces surrendered back to Yan.

== Conspiracy against Murong Ke and death ==
In 360, Murong Jun died. Before his death, he assigned Muyu Gen, Murong Ke, Murong Ping and Yang Wu to serve as regents and handle state affairs for his child heir, Murong Wei. After Murong Wei ascended the throne, Muyu Gen was appointed as Grand Instructor. It was said that Muyu Gen became increasingly arrogant and lacking respect by the day following Jun's death. He was also begrudging of Murong Ke, who, despite serving a shorter time compared to Gen, was entrusted with more power over the government.

Meanwhile, Murong Wei's mother, Empress Dowager Kezuhun, was involving herself in matters beyond the palace. Gen saw this as an opportunity to create conflict between Ke and the Emperor, so he went to Ke, telling him, "At the moment, our lord is young, and his mother is taking affairs into her own hands. Your Highness should prepare against the unexpected and watch over yourself. It was only because of your deeds that the state was able to settle. Since ancient times, it has been accepted for the younger brother to succeed the elder one. Once our late lord's tomb is completed, you should depose the young lord as a Prince and declare yourself the new ruler. Only then will Yan prosper." However, Murong Ke scolded him, "Are you drunk? What nonsense are you spouting? You and I have received our late lord's final edict to protect his son, why do you bring up such talk?" Muyu Gen apologized and left. Ke brought the matter up to his brother Murong Chui (previously Murong Ba) and Huangfu Zhen. Both men told urged him to get rid of Muyu Gen, but Ke felt it would be improper for a regent to act against his co-regent.

Having failed to convince Murong Ke, Muyu Gen turned to the Emperor and Empress Dowager. He told them that Murong Ke and Murong Ping were planning treason and asked to be given permission to execute them immediately. Kezehun believed him, but Murong Wei cast his doubts, saying, "The two lords are relatives to the throne and were worthy enough to be chosen by my late father on his deathbed to protect me. I trust they would do no such thing. Furthermore, how do we know that the one not stirring trouble is you, Grand Instructor?" Because of this, Muyu Gen quickly dropped the subject.

Muyu Gen met Murong Wei again for the last time, this time suggesting him to move back the capital from Ji to Yan's old capital in Longcheng. Gen told him, "Currently, the realm is in desolation, and many states oppose us. If our state continues to grow, so will our worries. It is best that we return east." When Murong Ke and Murong Ping heard of this, they secretly sent a memorial highlighting Muyu Gen's crimes. They then ordered the general Fu Yan to interrogate Muyu Gen, his wife, his children and his supporters. They were all later executed, and a general amnesty was declared. There was a lot of commotion among the people when they heard of the executions, but Murong Ke was able to calm them and restore order.
