= Song of the Xianbei Brother =

Classical Chinese and Murong epic

The Song of the Xianbei Brother (Chinese: 阿幹歌; pinyin: āgān gē) is a popular song of the Xianbei people composed by Murong Hui in 285 AD. It is preserved in Chinese translation (Note: An early record of the song (though not its lyrics) was found in the Book of Song.) and is about the Xianbei chief's regrets for having sent his brother away to the West. The original Chinese translation left the Xianbei word for elder brother (A-kan) in the title, which is identical to the Mongolic word for elder brother (Aqan or Aghan). The same word exists in Turkic languages and Tungusic languages.The song was first translated into English in 1939.

== English translation ==
Translation in iambic pentameter: My brother's gone away and not returned. It is indeed an easy thing to leave But coming back's the more demanding task. Though horses kick each other, men should not. Tis true that strife twixt humans can flare up As it is plain that even horses fight. My brother to Mount Bailang you have gone A thousand miles of distance far away. Mount Lung how very far from me your heights! Mount Ing how very cold to me your peaks! There's no sign nowhere of my brother still My heart is desolate and grows full sore.	Simon Wickham-Smith's translation: My brother went away and has not returned It is so easy to leave But so difficult to come back Horses kick out, we, humans, should not Hostility can be found in humans And hostile too can horses find themselves My brother you went to Mount Bailang A thousand miles away Mount Lung is so very high! Mount Ing is so very cold! There is no sign of my brother And my heart is sore

== Background of the song ==
The separation of Tuyuhun from the Murong Xianbei occurred during the Western Jin Dynasty (266-316), which succeeded the Cao Wei (220-265) in northern China. Legends accounted the separation as caused by a fight between Tuyuhun's horses and those of his younger brother, Murong Hui. The actual cause was intense struggle over the Khanate position and disagreement over their future directions. The faction that supported Murong Hui for the Khanate position aimed at ruling over China, whereas Tuyuhu intended to preserve the Xianbei culture and lifestyle. The disagreement resulted in Tuyuhu being proclaimed as Khan, or Kehan, and he eventually undertook the long westward journey under the title of the Prince of Jin, or "Jin Wang", followed by other Xianbei and Wuhuan groups. While passing through western Liaoning and Mt. Bai, more Xianbei groups joined them from the Duan, Yuwen, and Bai sections. At the Hetao Plains near Ordos in Inner Mongolia, Tuyuhun Khan led them to reside by Mt. Yin for over thirty years, as the Tuoba Xianbei and Northern Xianbei joined them through political and marriage alliances. After settling down in the northwest, they established the powerful Tuyuhun Kingdom named to his honor as the first Khan who led them there, by subjugating the native peoples who were summarily referred to as the “Qiang” and included more than 100 different and loosely coordinated tribes that did not submitted to each other or any authorities.

After Tuyuhun Khan departed from the northeast, Murong Hui composed an “Older Brother’s Song,” or “the Song of A Gan:” “A Gan” is Chinese transcription of “a ga” for “older brother” in the Xianbei language. The song lamented his sadness and longing for Tuyuhun. Legends accounted that Murong Hui often sang it until he died and the song got spread into central and northwest China. The Murong Xianbei whom he had led successively founded the Former Yan (281-370), Western Yan (384-394), Later Yan (383-407), and Southern Yan (398-410).
