= Murong Ren =

Duke of Liaodong (died 336)

Murong Ren 慕容仁

Duke of Liaodong (遼東公)
- Reign: 334–336

General Who Conquers the Caitiffs (征虜將軍)
- In office 319 – 334
- Monarch: Emperor Yuan of Jin/Emperor Ming of Jin/Emperor Cheng of Jin

General of Chariots and Cavalry (車騎將軍) (self-appointed)
- In office 333 – 336
- Monarch: Emperor Cheng of Jin

Inspector of Pingzhou (平州刺史)
- In office 334 – 336
- Monarch: Emperor Cheng of Jin

Personal details
- Born: Unknown Chaoyang, Liaoning
- Died: 336
- Relations: Murong Huang (brother); Murong Zhao (brother); Murong Han (half-brother)
- Parents: Murong Hui (father); Lady Duan (mother)
- Childhood name: Qiannian (千年)

Murong Ren (died 336), childhood name Qiannian, was a member of the ruling house of China's Former Yan dynasty during the Sixteen Kingdoms period. He was the brother of the Former Yan founder, Murong Huang (Emperor Wenming). He was Murong Hui's second son through Lady Duan (段夫人).

In 333, following the succession of Murong Huang to their father's title, Murong Ren conspired with his younger brother Murong Zhao (慕容昭) to rebel against Huang. Although their plot was discovered, Murong Ren was able to secure Liaodong from Murong Huang and challenge his claim as the Duke of Liaodong. The civil war between Huang and Ren lasted for four years before Ren was defeated by Murong Huang's daring surprise attack through the frozen Bohai Sea in 336.

== Career under Murong Hui ==
Murong Ren was the second of three sons born to Murong Hui and Lady Duan. The eldest of the three was Murong Huang and the youngest was Murong Zhao. In 319, after Hui forced the Jin's Inspector of Pingzhou, Cui Bi, to flee to Goguryeo, he had Murong Ren appointed General Who Conquers The Caitiffs and stationed him in Liaodong. During his time in Liaodong, Murong Ren allowed the local officials to keep their posts the same as before, which won him support in the region.

Near the end of the year, Goguryeo invaded Liaodong a number of times. Murong Ren and his eldest brother through his father's concubine, Murong Han, campaigned against Goguryeo and later obtained King Micheon's proposals for peace and an alliance. After accepting his proposals, the two of them returned. However, Goguryeo invaded Liaodong again at the end of 320, but Murong Ren managed to badly rout them. Since then, Goguryeo no longer intruded into Murong Ren's domain. The following year in 321, Murong Ren was transferred to Pingguo (平郭, in modern Yingkou, Liaoning) while Murong Han took his place in Liaodong.

In 325, Shi Le, the ruler of Later Zhao, persuaded the chieftain of the Yuwen tribe, Yuwen Qidegui with ranks and titles to attack Murong Hui, who had refused to accept Shi Le's peace offer. Murong Huang was ordered to lead the army against the Yuwen with Ren commanding his left wing. While Qidegui fought Huang, Qidegui sent his nephew, Yuwen Xibaxiong (宇文悉拔雄) to attack Ren. Ren defeated and beheaded Xibaxiong before joining up with Huang to overwhelm Qidegui. Qidegui abandoned his army and fled, so Huang and Ren sent their light cavalry to pursue them, only turning back once they have chased him a great distance. Meanwhile, the brothers occupied many of the Yuwen-controlled cities and took their treasures and livestock. The inhabitants of the cities also gave their surrender to Murong Hui and moved into his territory.

== Civil war with Murong Huang ==
Murong Hui died in 333, so Murong Huang succeeded to his titles. Huang's status as his father's heir had been established as far back as 321, but he still held jealousy towards his three brothers, Murong Ren, Murong Zhao and Murong Han, who were all equally favoured by their father as Huang was. Murong Ren and Murong Han were both distinguished generals under Murong Hui and had popular backing from the gentry, while Murong Zhao was known for his skills and talents. The three were well aware of Huang's feelings about them. Shortly after Huang's ascension, Han felt insecure of his position and fled to the Duan tribe with his sons.

=== Seizing Liaodong ===
Murong Ren left his post in Pingguo to attend his father's funeral at Jicheng (棘城, in modern Jinzhou, Liaoning). There, he expressed his worries to Murong Zhao about Murong Huang's excessively strict laws and how the two had not shown enough courtesy to him on multiple occasions. Zhao told him that as sons of their father and his chief wife, Murong Hui's territory should be divided between the three of them. Zhao then told Ren that he should return to Pingguo and raise his troops against Huang while Zhao stay behind and observe Huang's situation from within. Ren agreed with his plan, and after returning to Pingguo, he led his troops west in rebellion.

Meanwhile, however, someone leaked Ren and Zhao's plans to Huang. Huang did not fully believe it at first, so he sent envoys to Ren to determine if this was true. Ren had arrived at the Huang River when the envoys reached him, and upon learning that his plot had been uncovered, he beheaded the envoys before returning to Pingguo. After forcing Murong Zhao to commit suicide, Murong Huang sent 5,000 troops under Dong Shou and Huang's half-brothers, Murong You (慕容幼), Murong Zhi (慕容稚), Murong Jūn and Murong Hàn (慕容汗; not to be confused with Murong Han) to campaign against Ren. He also sent his Army Libationer, Feng Yi to stabilize Liaodong.

Murong Ren fought his half-brothers and Dong Shou north of Wencheng (汶城), where he won a great victory. You, Zhi and Jūn were captured while Dong Shou, being a former subordinate of Ren, surrendered to him. The generals, Wang Bing (王冰) and Sun Ji (孫機), joined forces with Ren and handed him over Xiangping (襄平, in modern Liaoyang, Liaoning) while others such as Feng Chou (封抽), Yi Yi (乙逸), Han Jiao (韓矯) and Gao Xu (高詡) abandoned their cities and fled to Huang. Murong Hàn managed to escape and retreat with Feng Yi, who was unable to enter the region. The victory at Wencheng placed Liaodong under Ren's control, dividing Huang's territory into two.

=== Rule over Liaodong ===
Almost immediately, Ren received the backing of the Murong's rival Xianbei clans, including the Yuwen and Duan tribes. Ren would coordinate attacks with the tribes against Huang throughout the rest of the war. In early 334, Ren appointed Zhai Kai (翟楷) and Pang Jian (龐鑒) as his own Colonel of Eastern Yi Tribes and Chancellor of Liaodong. Later on, he declared himself Inspector of Pingzhou and Duke of Liaodong. Meanwhile, Duan Liao, the chief of the Duan tribe, began his moves against Murong Huang. Duan Liao sent his brother Duan Lan to attack Liucheng (柳城; southwest of present-day Chaoyang, Liaoning), but he could not capture the city. He later defeated reinforcements led by Murong Hàn and Feng Yi at Niuwei Valley (牛尾谷; north of Liucheng) but was unable to follow up on it as objections from Murong Han, now a general of the Duans, forced him to retreat.

In August, Murong Ren detained Jin envoys at Mashi Crossing (馬石津, southwest of Dalian, Liaoning) who were on their way to grant Murong Huang his late father's titles. In December, Huang's forces reached Xiangping. A man named Wang Ji (王岌) secretly offered Huang to surrender the city, so Huang occupied the city with ease while Zhai Kai and Pang Jian fled on their horses. Jujiu (居就), Xinchang (新昌) and other counties also surrendered to Huang, and Huang had the major families in Liaodong divided and relocated to his capital in Jicheng. Ren attacked Xinchang a few months later but was driven away by Wang Yu (王寓), who proceeded to relocate the people of Xinchang to Xiangping.

Near the end of 335, Murong Ren decided to release the envoys he had apprehended to allow them to return south. However, they instead decided to go to Jicheng first, granting Huang his titles. Meanwhile, envoys from the Duan and Yuwen tribes were at Pingguo and sleeping outside the walls of the city. Huang ordered his general Zhang Ying (張英) to ambush them. Zhang killed ten people from the Yuwen while capturing the Duan envoys and bringing them back to Huang.

=== Defeat and death ===
In February 336, Murong Huang launched a surprise attack on Pingguo through the Bohai Sea, which had frozen over. As they approached the vicinity of Pingguo, Murong Ren's scouts quickly informed him of the threat. He was irked by his failure to stop Zhang Ying the previous year, so this time, he wished to rush out in hopes of crushing the enemies. He mistakenly believed that the threat was small raiding force, unaware that Huang had come with a large force. Bringing out his whole army, Ren marched northwest of his city to mount his defence. Once Huang's army began to advance, however, Murong Jūn brought his soldiers to defect to Huang's side, which immediately demoralized Ren's troops and stopped them in their tracks. Thus, Huang easily dispatched Ren's soldiers and dealt him a decisive defeat.

Murong Ren tried to flee from the scene, but his personal riders betrayed him and turned him over to Huang. The riders, however, were ordered by Huang to be executed for treachery, while Ren was forced to commit suicide in similar fashion to Murong Zhao. A number of Ren's partisans were executed while the rest fled east to seek refuge with Goguryeo, some dying to Huang's pursuers in the process. The others were forgiven and allowed to serve in Huang's administration.
