= Murong =

Ancient tribe in China and present Surname

Muren
- Muren in regular script
- Pronunciation: Mùróng (Pinyin), Мөрөн (Mongolian)
- Language: Mongolic Language

Origin
- Language: Xianbei
- Derivation: name of the ancestor of the Muren tribe

Other names
- Variant form: Murong (Mandarin)

The Murong (Chinese: 慕容; pinyin: Mùróng; Wade–Giles: Mu⁴-jung²; LHC: *mɑ^{C}-joŋ; EMC: *mɔ^{h}-juawŋ) or Muren refers to an ethnic Xianbei tribe who are attested from the time of Tanshihuai (r. 156–181). Different strands of evidence exist linking the Murong to the Mongol nomadic confederation in Central Asia. The Former Yan (337–370), Later Yan (384–409), Western Yan (384–394), Southern Yan (398–410) dynasties as well as Tuyuhun (285–670) were all founded by Murong peoples.

Murong is also a surname, predominantly used by people of Xianbei descent. Prominent individuals who bear the surname include the Emperors and family of Former Yan and Later Yan, Murong Ke, Murong Long, Murong Sanzang (慕容三藏), Murong Yanzhao (慕容延钊), Murong Yanchao, Murong Nong, Murong Han, Murong Chuqiang (慕容楚强), Murong Haoran (慕容浩然), and the fictional character Murong Fu (慕容復). When Han peoples during the reign of Yuwen Tai were forced to change their surnames, Murong was one of three officially mandated Xianbei surnames. This policy was reversed by Emperor Wen of Sui, but some Han people retained the Murong surname.

== Origins ==
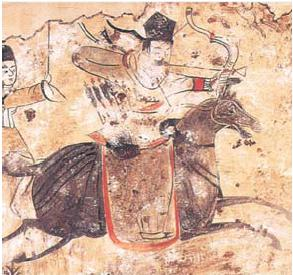
Painting of a Murong archer from an Xianbei tomb excavated in 1982 in Chaoyang, Liaoning.

The chieftain Murong was the first ancestor of the Murong tribe, which was named after him. He was a daren (chieftain noble) of the Middle Section during the rule of Tanshihuai (r. 156–181). The Records of the Three Kingdoms records:

Tanshihuai of the Xianbei divided his territory into three sections: the eastern, the middle and the western. From the You Beiping to the Liao River, connecting the Fuyu and Mo to the east, it was the eastern section. There were more than twenty counties. The darens (chiefs) (of this section) were called Mijia, Queji, Suli and Huaitou. From the You Beiping to Shanggu to the west, it was the middle section. There were more than ten counties. The darens of this section were called Kezui, Queju, Murong, et al. From Shanggu to Dunhuang, connecting the Wusun to the west, it was the western section. There were more than twenty counties. The darens (of this section) were called Zhijian Luoluo, Rilü Tuiyan, Yanliyou, et al. These chiefs were all subordinate to Tanshihuai.

Tanshihuai's Xianbei state to which the Murong belonged fragmented following the fall of Budugen (222–234), who was the younger brother of Kuitou (r. 189–222). Kuitou was the nephew of Tanshihuai's incapable son and successor Helian (r. 181–199). The Murong consequently broke off and submitted to the Cao Wei dynasty, settling in the Liaoxi area. The Murong ruler at this time was Mohuba, a descendant of the chieftain Murong. Murong Mohuba actively supported Sima Yi's Liaodong campaign in 238, leading an auxiliary Murong force. Mohuba was succeeded in 246 by his son Muyan (木延) who also aided the Cao Wei campaign against the Goguryeo that same year.

Muyan's son Shegui (涉歸), fought against the Jin dynasty (266–420), and was pushed back to the upper Liao River region. Shegui died in 283, and his younger brother Shan (刪) usurped the leadership. Murong Shan was killed in 285, and the people proclaimed Shegui's son Murong Hui (r. 285–333) as their chieftain. Hui attacked the Buyeo kingdom in 285, capturing ten thousand prisoners. He launched an attack on the agricultural area of the Liao River basin in 286 that had been occupied by Han Chinese settlers after Emperor Wu of Han's conquest of Old Chosŏn in 108 BC.

Hui founded a new capital nearby the modern-day city of Chaoyang, Liaoning in 294. In 284, an internal feud developed between Murong Hui and his older brother, Tuyuhun, which folktales explained as being caused by a horse race but which was in fact caused by disputes over the position of khan. As a result of the dispute, Murong Tuyuhun led his people and undertook a long westward journey passing through the Ordos Loop all the way to Qinghai Lake.

Some Murong members live in a town in Guangdong. Zhaoqing is the area where they lived since they moved from north to south. They practice no aspect of Xianbei culture or identity. The move to southern China from the north is described in their genealogical records. They are descended from Murong Bao. They moved to southern China after the foundation of the Ming dynasty.

== Language ==
The Xianbei are generally considered speakers of Mongolic languages. Some tribes such as the Duan, Qifu and Tufa have not left sufficient evidence to prove that they, as sub-tribes, were in fact Mongolic, although most scholars assume that they were Mongolic based on some indications. There is no doubt, however, regarding the Khitan and Shiwei sub-tribes being Mongolic (in their case there is strong evidence). As far as the Murong are concerned, the evidence pointing in the Mongolic direction is relatively convincing. Shimunek (2017) identifies the language of the Murong as Tuyuhun, or at least a linguistic variety closely related to it.

The Dunhuang Documents, P. 1283 (in Tibetan) records a very important piece of information about the Khitan and Murong:

The language (of the Khitan) and that of the Tuyuhun could generally communicate with each other.

The Khitan language is widely recognized as Mongolic. Mongolic, Turkic and Tungusic are mutually unintelligible, although they share significant loan-vocabulary.

The title khagan was first seen in a speech between 283 and 289, when the Xianbei chief Murong Tuyuhun (son of Murong Shegui by an illegitimate wife) tried to escape from his younger stepbrother Murong Hui, and began his route from Liaodong to the areas of Ordos Desert. One of Murong's generals called Yinalou addressed him as kěhán (可寒, later 可汗), some sources suggests that Tuyuhun might also have used the title after settling at Koko Nor in the 3rd century. Some suggest that the titles Khan and Khagan were originally Mongolic.

The Song of the Xianbei Brother is a popular song of the Xianbei people composed by Murong Hui in 285 AD. It is preserved in Chinese translation and is about the Xianbei chief's regrets for having sent his brother Tuyuhun away to the West. The original Chinese translation left the Xianbei word for elder brother (A-kan) in the title, which is identical to the Mongolic word for elder brother (Aqan or Aghan). The same word exists in Turkic and Tungusic languages, but the Xianbei are generally considered Mongolic peoples. This would make the song one of the earliest attestations of a Mongolic language.

The modern day minority of White Mongols or Monguor are regarded as the culturally and ethnically-distinct descendants of the Murong.

== Genetics ==
A genetic study published in the American Journal of Physical Anthropology in November 2007 examined of 17 individuals buried at the Murong Xianbei cemetery in Lamadong, Liaoning, China c. 300 AD. They were determined to be carriers of the maternal haplogroups B, C, D, F, G2a, Z, M, and J1b1. These haplogroups are common among East Asians, and to a lesser extent Siberians. The maternal haplogroups of the Murong Xianbei were noticeably different from those of the Huns and Tuoba Xianbei.

== Rulers ==
- Murong Mohuba (238)
- Murong Muyan (246)
- Murong Shegui (died 283)
- Murong Shan (died 285)
- Murong Hui (285–333)

== People ==
- Murong Bao (355–398), formally Emperor Huimin of (Later) Yan
- Murong Chao (385–410), last emperor of the Chinese/Xianbei state Southern Yan
- Murong Chong (d. 386), formally Emperor Wei of (Western) Yan
- Murong Chui (326–396), formally Emperor Wucheng of (Later) Yan
- Murong De (336–405), formally Emperor Xianwu of (Southern) Yan
- Murong Fuyun (597–635), ruler of the Xianbei/Qiang/Tibetan state Tuyuhun
- Murong Huang (297–348), formally Prince Wenming of (Former) Yan
- Murong Hong (d. 384), founder of the Chinese/Xianbei state Western Yan
- Murong Hui (269–333), Xianbei chief and Duke Xiang of Liaodong, posthumously honored as Prince Wuxuan of Yan
- Murong Jun (319–360), formally Emperor Jingzhao of (Former) Yan
- Murong Ke (d. 367), formally Prince Huan of Taiyuan
- Murong Lin (d. 398), general and imperial prince of the Chinese/Xianbei state Later Yan
- Murong Long (d. 397), formally Prince Kang of Gaoyang
- Murong Nong (d. 398), formally Prince Huanlie of Liaoxi
- Murong Nuohebo (d. 688), last khan of the Xianbei/Qiang/Tibetan state Tuyuhun
- Murong Sheng (373–401), an emperor of the Chinese/Xianbei state Later Yan
- Murong Ping (?–?), regent of the Chinese/Xianbei state Former Yan during the reign of Murong Wei (Emperor You)
- Murong Shaozong (501–549), military general of the Northern Wei and Eastern Wei
- Murong Shun (d. 635), khan of the Xianbei/Qiang/Tibetan state Tuyuhun
- Murong Wei (350–385), formally Emperor You of (Former) Yan
- Murong Xi (385–407), emperor of the Chinese/Xianbei state Later Yan
- Murong Yao (d. 386) was an emperor of the Chinese/Xianbei state Western Yan
- Murong Yi (d. 386) was a ruler of the Chinese/Xianbei state Western Yan
- Murong Yong (d. 394), last emperor of the Chinese/Xianbei state Western Yan
- Murong Zhong (d. 386) emperor of the Chinese/Xianbei state Western Yan
- Princess Murong, princess of Northern Yan, wife of Feng Hong

== Sources ==
- Wang, Haijing; et al. (November 2007). "Molecular genetic analysis of remains from Lamadong cemetery, Liaoning, China". American Journal of Physical Anthropology. 134 (3). American Association of Physical Anthropologists: 404–411. doi:10.1002/ajpa.20685. PMID 17632796.
