= Murong Han =

Former Yan general (died 344)

- 慕容翰

General Who Establishes Might (建威將軍)
- In office ?–344
- Monarch: Murong Huang

Personal details
- Born: Unknown Changli, Western Jin dynasty
- Died: 344 Former Yan dynasty
- Relations: Murong Huang (half-brother); Murong Ren (half-brother)
- Children: Murong Gou
- Parent: Murong Hui (father)
- Courtesy name: Yuanyong (元邕)

Murong Han (died 344), courtesy name Yuanyong, was an ethnic Xianbei military general of China's Former Yan dynasty during the Sixteen Kingdoms period.

He was an accomplished commander under his father, Murong Hui, and was most known for his victory over the Yuwen tribe in the Battle of Jicheng in 319. After his half-brother, Murong Huang, succeeded their father in 333, he was forced to flee due to Huang's suspicion of him. For seven years, he served the Murong clan's rival tribes, the Duan and Yuwen, but was eventually welcomed back by Huang shortly after the latter declared himself Prince of Yan. Han was a vital figure in the early years of Former Yan as he played roles in the state's success against Goguryeo and the Yuwen. However, he soon caught the suspicion of Huang once more, and was finally forced to commit suicide.

== Service under Murong Hui ==
Murong Han was born the eldest son of the Xianbei chieftain, Murong Hui through a concubine. Records describe him as having a heroic and bold personality along with being well-versed in strategy. He had ape-like arms and was an exceptional archer who wielded a bow weighing over 3 shi and used arrows that were longer than usual. He followed his father on numerous military campaigns and eventually became his General of Hawkish Display.

=== Suxi Lian and Muwan Jin's rebellion ===
In 309, two Xianbei leaders, Suxi Lian (素喜連) and Muwan Jin (木丸津), revolted and caused trouble in Liaodong. At the time, the Jin provincial armies were preoccupied with the upheaval in the Central Plains and were thus ineffective at stopping the revolt. In 311, Murong Han advised his father to campaign against the rebels, arguing that they would bring order and win the support of the people in the region while also absorbing the rebels' armies. He added that their actions would also present their loyalty to the ruling Jin dynasty and at the same time bring personal gains for their territory. Huang was impressed by son's prudence, stating "I merely thought of you as child. How could you have acquired such wisdom?" Thus, Huang campaigned against the rebels and placed Han in command of the vanguard. After killing Suxi Lian and Muwan Jin, they absorbed the rebels' armies and placed around 3,000 households under their governance.

=== Campaign against the Duan tribe ===
In 313, the Murong tribe participated in a joint campaign with the Jin Inspector of Youzhou, Wang Jun and the Tuoba tribe against the Duan tribe. Murong Hui entrusted the command over the expeditionary force to Murong Han. After departing from the Murong capital, Jicheng (棘城, in modern Jinzhou, Liaoning), Han led his army to capture Tuhe (徒河; in present-day Chaoyang, Liaoning) and Xincheng (新城; northeast of present-day Shenyang, Liaoning). He then marched to Yangle (陽樂; present-day Yi County, Liaoning), where he fought and captured the Jin Administrator of Liaoxi, Yang Dan (陽躭). However, after the Tuoba general, Tuoba Liuxiu, was defeated by the Duan, Han halted the campaign and withdrew to Tuhe, where he utilized its natural defences and remained for several years.

=== Battle of Jicheng (319) ===
In 319, the Jin Inspector of Pingzhou, Cui Bi was unsettled by Murong Hui's growing influence in Liaodong and conspired with Goguryeo, the Duan and the Yuwen tribe to launch a punitive expedition. All three states responded to this alliance by raising troops and advancing towards Jicheng. Murong Hui managed to make Goguryeo and the Duan retreat by sowing discord among their ranks, but the leader of the Yuwen, Yuwen Xiduguan, remained steadfast in his intention to conquer Jicheng and placed the city under siege. As a result, Murong Hui requested Murong Han, who was in Tuhe, to lead his men to partake in the defence of the Jicheng. However, Han sent an envoy rejecting his order, instead insisting that he operate outside of Jicheng to attack the enemy from two sides. Hui was initially unsure with the plan, but after some convincing from his official, Han Shou (韓壽), he agreed to allow Murong Han to remain at Tuhe.

As Murong Han remained stationary, Xiduguan became worried that he was secretly planning and decided to prioritize in defeating him first. He sent a separate dispatchment to carry out a surprise attack on Murong Han, but upon learning that the enemy was approaching him, Han sent his subordinates disguised as envoys of the Duan to meet with the Yuwen forces. Han's subordinates falsely informed them that Duan forces were at Tuhe, and they should quickly advance to take the city together. The Yuwen were delighted by the news and rushed to Tuhe without any precaution. Before they arrived, Han had left the city and concealed his troops to lay an ambush. Once the Yuwen army appeared, Han launched a surprised attack and captured many of their troops.

Capitalizing on his victory, Murong Han advanced and dispatched an envoy to Jicheng, requesting Murong Hui to mobilize his entire army and attack the main force of the Yuwen. In response, Murong Hui entrusted Murong Huang and his chief clerk Pei Yi with an elite force as the vanguard, while he personally led a large army as the main force. Xiduguan, completely unprepared, hastily sent out his entire army upon learning of Murong Hui's departure. At that time, Murong Han, leading a thousand cavalry, had already stationed himself behind the enemy camp. When the battle began between the vanguard forces, Murong Han took the opportunity to infiltrate Xiduguan's camp, setting it ablaze. As a result, the Yuwen army fell into chaos and suffered a great defeat, with Xiduguan barely fleeing with his own life.

=== Guarding Liaodong ===
Later that year, King Micheon of Goguryeo launched frequent raids on the Murong tribe's domain. Murong Hui sent Murong Han and Murong Ren to suppress Goguryeo, but shortly after doing so, Micheon sued for peace. Thus, the campaign was halted and the army withdrew. In 321, Hui appointed Han to guard Liaodong. Han was known for comforting the people and favoring Confucianism, and it was said that no one, from scholars to soldiers, refused to follow him. His influence was significant, and Goguryeo did not dare carry out further raids under his watch.

== Service under Duan Liao ==
After Murong Hui died in 333, he was succeeded by his heir, Murong Huang, and Murong Han was appointed General Who Establishes Might. Despite being the heir, Huang harbored jealousy towards Han and his two other brothers, Murong Ren and Murong Zhao, as they were their father's favorites. In Han's case, although he was an illegitimate child, he also had an exceptional reputation and was backed by the local gentry. Han knew about his brother's jealousy towards him and became worried that harm would come to him. Thus, Han fled and defected to the Duan tribe with his sons. The leader of the Duan, Duan Liao, had long heard of his fame and happily received him, treating him with courtesy and respect.

=== Battle of Liucheng ===
In 334, Murong Han followed Duan Liao's brother, Duan Lan, to attack the Murong stronghold of Liucheng (柳城; southwest of present-day Chaoyang, Liaoning). Liucheng's defenders, Shi Cong (石琮) and Muyu Ni (慕輿泥) fiercely defended the city and forced the Duan army to retreat. Due to their loss, Duan Liao reprimanded Duan Lan and Murong Han and angrily forced them to take the stronghold at all cost. Duan Lan attacked Liucheng again, but was once more unsuccessful. However, he was able to inflict a great defeat on the Murong reinforcements at Niuwei Valley (牛尾谷; north of Liucheng). Seizing the opportunity, Duan Lan planned on pursuing the retreating enemy forces and penetrate deep into their territory. However, Murong Han, secretly concerned for his homeland's safety, advised Duan Lan against his decision, believing that they may be lured into a trap. Duan Lan saw through his excuse and attempted to assure him his tribe's safety, but Murong Han persisted by ordering his troops to withdraw, forcing Duan Lan to follow suit.

=== Fall of the Duan ===
In 338, Shi Hu of the Later Zhao and Murong Huang began a joint campaign to conquer Liaoxi from the Duan. Attacked from various directions, Duan Liao considered on intercepting Huang's forces first, but Murong Han suggested that they concentrate their troops on the larger Zhao army. Duan Lan, who was nearby, angrily accused Han of planning to undermine the Duan as he previously did at Liucheng and refused to listen to his plan. Duan Lan led his troops to attack Murong Huang, but was decisively defeated in an ambush. As Zhao forces captured Duan cities in succession, Duan Liao decided to abandon his capital and flee with his followers to Mount Miyun (密雲山; in present-day Miyun District, Beijing). Before leaving, Duan Liao expressed his regret for not following Murong Han's advice. The two parted ways, with Han fleeing north to join the Yuwen tribe.

== Service under Yuwen Yidougui ==
Although the chieftain of the Yuwen tribe, Yuwen Yidougui, initially welcomed Murong Han, he soon grew apprehensive of Han due to his talents and reputation. Han, not wanting to garner anymore suspicion, pretended to be mad and drink in excess. He would ruffle his hair while singing loudly, urinate himself while lying down and kneel and beg for food. The people living within the Yuwen state believed his acting, hating him but also deeming him not a threat. As he was left unobserved, Murong Han would secretly go out to study and memorize the geography of the tribe's domain.

=== Returning to Murong Huang ===
Murong Han lived with the Yuwen tribe until 340. Murong Huang, who had become the Prince of Yan in 338, knew that Han had not fled intending to rebel against him, but due to his own suspicions. Huang sent a merchant, Wang Che (王車), to the marketplace of the Yuwen domain to observe Han's activities. When Han saw the merchant, he did not say a word, but only hit his own chest and nodded. Hearing Wang Che's report on the incident, Huang knew that Han wanted to return and sent Wang Che to welcome him back. Huang had given Wang Che a bow and arrows crafted specifically for Han, which Wang Che buried at the side of a road and informed Han of their location. In February or March 340, Murong Han stole Yidougui's prized horse, retrieved the bow and arrows, and fled with his two sons.

Yidougui sent a hundred riders to chase after him. From a distant, Han said to his pursuers, "I have long desired to return to my homeland, and now that I have obtained this valuable horse, I will never return again. In the past, I foolishly deceived you with my words, but my archery skills have not diminished. If you come any closer, you will be heading towards your own deaths!" However, the riders ignored his warning and continued their pursuit. Han then said, "I have been under the care of your state for a long time, so I have no grudge with you. Place a blade a hundred paces away from me, and I will show you that I can shoot it. If I shoot through it, you may return home. If I miss, you are free to come closer." The riders agreed to his request, and with a single shot, Han was able to shoot through the ring of the blade. Honouring their deal, the riders gave up their chase. Huang was ecstatic by his brother's return and treated him with generous treatment and favour.

== Service under Former Yan ==
=== Campaign against Goguryeo ===
After his return, Murong Han grew to the rank of General Who Establishes Might. Eventually, Han proposed to Huang his plan to deal with Former Yan's enemies, Goguryeo and the Yuwen tribe. Having experienced living in their domain, Han informed his brother that the Yuwen tribe was in a weak state in terms of leadership and military, and their alliance with Later Zhao was nothing to worry about due to the distance between the two sides. However, he was more concern about Goguryeo, who would likely take advantage of Yan's absence should they campaign against the Yuwen tribe. Therefore, he advised Huang that they pacify Goguryeo first before going after the Yuwen tribe, believing that the Yuwen were too dependent on their defences to react. Huang was pleased with his plan and accepted it.

In 342, Huang made preparations to invade Goguryeo. There were two routes leading to Goguryeo; a flat and wide northern route, and a narrow and dangerous southern route. Han advised Huang to send the main force down the southern route to catch the enemy by surprise, as Goguryeo would likely expect an invading army to go through the northern route and concentrate their forces there. He also added that they send smaller force down the northern route to act as a distraction before falling back. Huang accepted his suggestions and made Han one of his vanguard generals.

As Murong Han predicted, the Goguryeo king, Gogugwon, sent his brother, Gomu (고무; 高武), with 50,000 elite soldiers to defend the northern route while he led weaker troops to guard the southern route. Han fought Gogugwon at Mokjeo (木底, in modern Fushun, Liaoning) long enough for Murong Huang to arrive. After a great defeat, Gogugwon went into hiding as Yan troops took the Goguryeo capital, Hwando. Yan forces ransacked and destroyed the capital and took tens of thousands captives, including Gogugwon's mother, wife and the body of Micheon, before returning. Gogugwon would submit to Yan the following year.

=== Campaign against the Yuwen tribe ===
In 343, Yuwen Yidougui sent his general, Moqian Hun (莫淺渾), to attack Yan. Murong Huang initially restrained his generals from engaging Moqian Hun, giving him the impression that the Yan forces were afraid of him. As Moqian Hun let his guard down by spending his time drinking and hunting, Huang sent Murong Han to attack him. Han greatly routed the Yuwen army, forcing Moqian Hun to barely escape with his life while capturing all the enemy troops.

In 344, Murong Huang began his conquest of the Yuwen tribe, with Murong Han serving as the vanguard general. In response, Yidougui sent the Chief of Nanluo, Yuwen Sheyegan (宇文涉夜干) with the tribe's elite soldiers to resist the Yan invaders. Huang sent a messenger to Han warning him of Sheyegan's capabilities, but Han believed that defeating a key general will cause the rest of the Yuwen tribe's forces to collapse. Han added that he was familiar with Sheyegan and knew that his reputation was merely based on rumours. He led a frontal assault against Sheyegan and enticed him to advance. Then, Huang's son, Murong Ba, brought his army to attack Sheyegan's flank. Sheyegan was killed in battle, causing the Yuwen soldiers to stop fighting and scatter. The Yan forces then advanced onto the Yuwen tribe's capital, Zimengchuan (紫蒙川, in present-day Chifeng, Inner Mongolia), and forced Yidougui into fleeing, thus conquering their state.

== Death ==
Despite Yan's victory over the Yuwen tribe, Murong Han was struck by an arrow during the campaign. The arrow left Han ill and bedridden, but he was able to slowly recover and practiced riding his horse at home as he recuperated. However, a witness spotted him riding, and they reported what they saw to Murong Huang, believing that Han was secretly faking his illness and plotting something devious. Huang, who remained jealous of Han even after accepting him back, thus ordered him to commit suicide. Han killed himself by poison, and before his death, he said to his attendants, "I fled with guilt, yet shamefully returned. My death today was long overdue. Yet, with the Jie [Later Zhao] still rampant in the Central Plains, I had hoped to strengthen the state and unify the world in spite of my shortcomings. Though I could not fulfill my ambition, I hold no resentment. This must be the will of heaven."

== Children ==
Murong Han had at least two sons, but only one son, Murong Gou (慕容鉤), was recorded. Despite the manner of his father's death, Gou served as the Administrator of Leling under Murong Huang's successor, Murong Jun. He jointly governed Yanci (厭次, around present-day Dezhou, Shandong) with the Inspector of Qingzhou, Zhu Tu (朱禿), who he often flaunted his status as member of the imperial family to. In 354, Zhu Tu grew frustrated with his behaviour and killed him before defecting to the neighbouring Duan Qi state.
