= Murong Hui =

Murong Hui (慕容廆, 269 – 4 June 333), courtesy name Yiluo (弈洛), was an Xianbei chief, formally known as Duke Xiang of Liaodong, posthumously honored as Emperor Wuxuan (武宣皇帝). In the Book of Jin, Murong Hui was described as tall, physically strong and having a beautiful appearance.

Murong Hui had initially been a Xianbei chief who fought Jin forces during the late reign of Emperor Wu of Jin, Jin's founding emperor, but he submitted as a Jin vassal in 289. Under constant attack by fellow Xianbei chief Duan Jie (段階) of the Duan tribe, he humbly sought peace with the Duan and married one of Duan Jie's daughters. From this union came Murong Huang (in 297) and two of his younger brothers, Murong Ren (慕容仁) and Murong Zhao (慕容昭).

During Murong Hui's rule as tribal chief, the Jin dynasty's central government was in constant turmoil and eventually collapsed due to infighting and agrarian rebellions, the strongest of which was the Xiongnu state Han-Zhao. As a result, many refugees arrived in the relatively safe domain of Murong Hui's, and as he treated the ethnically Han refugees with kindness, most chose to stay, greatly strengthening his power, and as Jin forces in the north gradually fell to Han-Zhao's capable general Shi Le (who later established his own independent state Later Zhao), Murong Hui became the only domain in northern China still under titular Jin rule, carrying the Jin-bestowed title of the Duke of Liaodong. He entrusted Murong Huang with many important military tasks such as fighting the powerful fellow Xianbei Yuwen tribe in 320 and 325. In early 322, Murong Hui named Murong Huang heir apparent. However, Murong Hui also greatly favored Murong Huang's brothers Murong Ren, Murong Zhao, and particularly Murong Han (慕容翰), who was regarded very highly as a general. Murong Huang became jealous and suspicious of these brothers, feelings which became known to them and which would sow the seeds of future troubles.

Murong Hui's elder brother was Murong Tuyuhun, an elder son of the chanyu Murong Shegui (慕容涉歸) of the Murong Xianbei who took his people from their original settlements on the Liaodong Peninsula to the Yin Mountains, crossing the Yellow River between 307 and 313, and into the eastern region of modern Qinghai; Murong Tuyuhun's tribe later became the Tuyuhun.

== See also ==
- Song of the Xianbei Brother

== Family ==
Consort and issue(s):

- Empress Wuxuan, of the Duan clan (武宣皇后 段氏)
  - Murong Huang, Prince Wenming (文明王慕容皝; 297– 25 October 348), third son
  - Murong Ren, Duke of Liaodong (遼東公慕容仁, d. 336), fourth son
  - Murong Zhao (慕容昭, d. 333), fifth son
- Unknown
  - Murong Han (慕容翰, d. 344), first son
  - Second son
  - Murong You (慕容幼), sixth son
  - Murong Zhi (慕容稚), seventh son
  - Murong Jūn, Prince Xiangyang (襄阳王 慕容軍), eighth son
  - Murong Han (慕容汗), ninth son
  - Murong Ping, Prince Shangyong (上庸王 慕容評), tenth son
  - Murong Biao, Prince Wuchang (武昌王 慕容彪), eleventh son
  - Princess Murong (慕容氏, d. 341), first daughter
    - Married Tuoba Shiyiqian (拓跋什翼犍), a son of Tuoba Yulü

Duke Xiang of Liaodong House of Murong Born: 269 Died: 333
Chinese nobility
| New creation | Duke of Liaodong; 321–333 | Succeeded by Murong Huang |
