= Murong Huang =

Prince of Former Yan from 337 to 348

Emperor Wenming of Former Yan 前燕文明帝
- Prince of Yan

Prince of Former Yan
- Reign: 23 November 337 – 25 October 348
- Successor: Murong Jun

Duke of Liaodong (遼東郡公)
- Reign: 4 June 333 – 23 November 337
- Predecessor: Murong Hui
- Successor: Himself (Became Prince of Yan)
- Born: 297
- Died: 348 (aged 50–51)
- Burial: Longping Mausoleum (龍平陵)
- Spouse: Princess Duan
- Issue: Murong Jun, Emperor of Former Yan; Murong Ke, Prince of Taiyuan; Murong Chui, Emperor of Later Yan; Murong De, Emperor of Southern Yan
Full name
- Family name: Mùróng (慕容); Given name: Huàng (皝)
Posthumous name
- Prince Wenming (文明王, lit. "civil and understanding"); Emperor Wenming (文明皇帝)
Temple name
- Taizu (太祖)
- House: Murong
- Dynasty: Former Yan
- Father: Murong Hui
- Mother: Empress Wuxuan

Murong Huang (Chinese: 慕容皝; 297 – 25 October 348), courtesy name Yuanzhen (元真), also known by his posthumous name as the Emperor Wenming of Former Yan (前燕文明帝), was the founding monarch of the Xianbei-led Former Yan dynasty of China. When he first succeeded his father Murong Hui in 333, he carried the Eastern Jin-bestowed title Duke of Liaodong, but in 337 claimed the title of Prince of Yan, which is traditionally viewed as the founding date of Former Yan. (Note: Emperor Cheng of Jin retroactively recognized Murong Huang's princely title in 341 after much debate among Eastern Jin officials.) After his son Murong Jun completely broke away from the Eastern Jin and claimed the title of emperor in January 353, he was posthumously elevated to imperial status. In the Book of Jin, Murong Huang was described as a strong looking tall man (approximately 1.91 metres (6.3 ft)).

== Early life ==
Murong Huang's father Murong Hui had initially been a Xianbei chief who fought Jin forces during the late reign of Emperor Wu of Jin, Jin's founding emperor, but he submitted as a Jin vassal sometime between 6 June and 4 July 289. Under constant attack by fellow Xianbei chief Duan Jie (段階) of the Duan tribe, he humbly sought peace with the Duan and married one of Duan Jie's daughters. From this union came Murong Huang (in 297) and two of his younger brothers, Murong Ren and Murong Zhao (慕容昭).

During Murong Hui's rule as tribal chief, the Jin dynasty's central government was in constant turmoil and eventually collapsed due to infighting and agrarian rebellions, the strongest of which was the Xiongnu state Han-Zhao. As a result, many refugees arrived in Murong Hui's relatively safe domain, and as he treated the ethnically Han refugees with kindness, most chose to stay, greatly strengthening his power, and as Jin forces in the north gradually fell to Han-Zhao's general Shi Le (Note: Shi later established his own independent state, Later Zhao), Murong Hui became the only domain in northern China still under titular Jin rule, carrying the Jin-bestowed title of the Duke of Liaodong. He entrusted Murong Huang with many important military tasks. These included fighting the powerful fellow Xianbei Yuwen tribe in 320 and 325. In early 322, Murong Hui named Murong Huang heir apparent. However, Murong Hui also greatly favored Murong Huang's brothers Murong Ren, Murong Zhao, and particularly Murong Han, who was regarded very highly as a general. Murong Huang became jealous and suspicious of these brothers, feelings which became known to them and which would sow the seeds of future troubles.

== Duke of Liaodong ==
On 4 June 333, Murong Hui died. Murong Huang took over his administration under the Jin-bestowed office of General Pingbei (平北將軍) and sent messengers to report his father's death to Emperor Cheng of Jin and request commission official for himself. Soon after, with Jin commission expected but not yet arrived, he claimed the title of Duke of Liaodong, which his father had carried.

Murong Huang carried out strict and harsh enforcement of laws and regulations, which unsettled some of his subordinates. His suspicions of Murong Han, Murong Ren, and Murong Zhao also became clear. Murong Han fled to the Duan tribe (Dukedom of Liaoxi) and became a general for the Duan chief Duan Liao (段遼). Murong Ren and Murong Zhao conspired to have Murong Ren attack the capital Jicheng (棘城, in modern Jinzhou, Liaoning) from his defense post of Pingguo (平郭, in modern Yingkou, Liaoning) and for Murong Zhao to rise within Jicheng to join him, ready to divide the dukedom if they succeeded. Murong Ren soon launched a surprise attack, but scouts by Murong Huang discovered the attack and readied for it, so Murong Ren instead captured the cities in the eastern dukedom (Liaodong Peninsula). The forces that Murong Huang sent to attack him were repelled, and Murong Ren claimed the Duke of Liaodong title for himself. Jin messengers sent to bestow Murong Huang the same titles his father had were intercepted and detained by Murong Ren.

Also in 334, Duan forces, under the commands of Murong Han and Duan Liao's brother Duan Lan (段蘭) attacked Liucheng (柳城, in modern Zhaoyang, Liaoning), and Murong Huang's forces sent to relieve Liucheng were defeated by Duan forces. Duan Lan wanted to further advance on Jicheng, but Murong Han, fearful that his own tribe would be destroyed, ordered a withdrawal. (Note: While his comments were intended to force Duan Lan to agree to a withdrawal, Murong Han's comments at this time stating that Murong Huang was "false and treacherous" may indicate what his true feelings about Murong Huang were.)

In early 336, Murong Huang made a surprise attack, personally leading his army by a route that Murong Ren did not expect—over the frozen Bohai Sea—arriving at Pingguo. Murong Ren, not realizing that it was a major attack, came out of the city to fight Murong Huang, who defeated and captured him, forcing him to commit suicide.

== Prince of Yan ==
In November 337, Murong Huang claimed the title of Prince of Yan for himself—a title that the Jin had previously considered but declined to confer on his father Murong Hui. This is commonly viewed as the founding of Former Yan, particularly because he also set up a governmental structure mirroring the Jin's imperial government, albeit with different office titles intentionally showing inferiority to the Jin.

That same year, Murong Huang, countering his father's prior policy of having no contact with the Jin's rival Later Zhao, sent messengers to Later Zhao promising to be a vassal and requesting a joint attack against the Duan. Later Zhao's emperor Shi Hu was pleased, and they agreed on an attack in 338. In the spring, they launched the attacks. Murong Huang quickly attacked and pillaged the Duan cities north of its capital Lingzhi (令支, in modern Tangshan, Hebei), defeating Duan Lan's forces. He then withdrew, and when Later Zhao forces arrived, Duan Liao no longer dared to face them but instead abandoned Lingzhi and fled. Lingzhi surrendered to Later Zhao. Shi Hu was happy about the victory but angry that Murong Huang withdrew before the armies could meet, and he decided to turn his armies against Murong Huang instead. With Later Zhao's massive armies arriving in Former Yan territory, nearly all of the cities submitted to Later Zhao except Jicheng. Murong Huang considered fleeing, but on the advice of his general Muyu Gen, he stayed and defended the city for nearly 20 days, and Later Zhao forces were forced to withdraw; Murong Huang then sent his son Murong Ke to attack the retreating Later Zhao troops, scoring a victory, and the only Later Zhao force remaining intact was that of Shi Min, Shi Hu's adopted grandson. After Later Zhao's withdrawal, Murong Huang recaptured the cities that had rebelled. He also took over cities formerly ruled by the Duan, extending into modern northern Hebei. In early 339, after Duan Liao sent conflicting requests to Later Zhao and Former Yan, requesting surrender, the Later Zhao and Former Yan forces engaged, and Murong Ke again won a victory over Later Zhao. Murong Huang honored Duan Liao as a guest and merged Duan's remaining forces into his own. Later that year, however, Duan planned a rebellion and was killed by Murong Huang. (Note: However, the Duan clan was not wiped out, and many members of the Duan clan later served as generals, officials, and imperial consorts of the Murongs.) From this point on, Former Yan forces conducted yearly raids against Later Zhao's border region. They also periodically attacked the Yuwen tribe and Goguryeo.

Also in 339, Murong Huang married his sister to Tuoba Shiyiqian, the Prince of Dai, cementing an alliance between the two Xianbei powers. (Note: The two would, however, engage in occasional battles after Princess Murong's death in 342.) He also sent messengers to the Jin capital to formally request from Emperor Cheng the title of Prince of Yan, explaining that he needed it to increase his authority over the people but that he was still loyal to the Jin. In 341, after several months of debate, Emperor Cheng granted Murong Huang the princely title.

In 340, Murong Han, who had fled to the Yuwen after the Duan were defeated but who had subsequently been mistrusted and mistreated by the Yuwen, agreed to return under Murong Huang's command, and returned to Liaodong. Murong Huang gave him a military command.

In 341, Murong Huang moved his capital from Jicheng to a newly built city, Longcheng (龍城, in modern Zhaoyang, Liaoning).

In 344, Murong Huang, with Murong Han as his deputy, attacked Yuwen, defeating it and forcing its chief Yuwen Yidougui (宇文逸豆歸) to flee. The Former Yan forces forcibly moved the Yuwen tribe south and merged them into Former Yan's own population. Later that year, Murong Huang, still apprehensive of Murong Han's abilities, forced him to commit suicide.

In 345, Murong Huang stopped using Jin's era names—which is viewed by some as the sign of Former Yan's formal independence.

In January or February 347, (Note: The Zizhi Tongjian dated Murong Huang's attack on Buyeo to the 1st month of the 3rd year of the Yonghe era of the reign of Emperor Mu of Jin; the month corresponds to 28 January to 26 February 347 in the Julian calendar.) Buyeo was attacked by Murong Huang, and King Hyeon (玄) was captured.

In October 348, Murong Huang grew ill and died. He was succeeded by his son Murong Jun.

== Era name ==
- Yanwang ("Prince of Yan") (燕王 Yānwáng) 337–348

== Personal information ==
- Empress Wenming, of the Duan clan (文明皇后 段王后)
  - Murong Jun, Crown Prince (太子 慕容儁, b. 319), 2nd son
- Empress Wenzhao, of the Lan clan (景德皇 后兰氏)
  - Murong Chui, Prince of Yan (燕王 慕容垂, b. 326), 5th son
- Consort, of the Gongsun clan (公孙夫人)
  - Murong Na, Prince of Beihai (北海王 慕容纳), 12th son
  - Murong De, Prince of Fanyang (范阳郡王 慕容德), 15th son
- Lady, of the Gao clan (高氏)
  - Murong Ke, Prince Huan of Taiyuan (太原桓王 慕容恪), 4th son
- Children
  - Murong Jiao, Prince of Fanyang (慕容交 范阳王), 1st son
  - Murong Dai, Prince of Yidu (宜都王 慕容逮), 3rd son
  - Murong You, Prince of Fanyang (范阳郡王慕容友), 6th son
  - Murong Li (慕容厲), the Prince of Xiapei (created 354)
  - Murong Du (慕容度), the Prince of Lelang (created 354)
  - Murong Yi (慕容宜), the Prince of Lujiang (created 354)
  - Murong Huan (慕容桓), the Prince of Yidu (created 354, killed by Former Qin forces 370)
  - Murong Dai (慕容逮), the Prince of Linhe (created 354)
  - Murong Hui (慕容徽), the Prince of Hejian (created 354)
  - Murong Long (慕容龍), the Prince of Liyang (created 354)
  - Murong Xiu (慕容秀), the Prince of Lanling (created 354)
  - Murong Yue (慕容岳), the Prince of Anfeng (created 354)
  - Murong Mo (慕容默), the Duke of Shi'an (created 354)
  - Murong Lou (慕容僂), the Duke of Nankang (created 354)
  - Murong Yu (慕容宇)
  - Murong Zhou (慕容宙), Prince of Zhangwu, later Prince Wei of Lelang, killed by rebels led by Duan Sugu 398
  - Princess Murong, married Tuoba Shiyiqian, posthumously honored as Empress Zhaocheng

== Notes ==
Prince Wenming of (Former) Yan House of Murong Born: 297 Died: 348
Chinese royalty
Preceded by Himself as Duke of Liaodong	Prince of Yan; 337–348	Succeeded by Murong Jun
Chinese nobility
Preceded by Murong Hui	Duke of Liaodong; 333–337	Succeeded by Himself as Prince of Yan
