= Yuwen =

Chinese surname

- Yuwen in regular script
- Pronunciation: Yǔwén (Pinyin)
- Language: Chinese

Origin
- Language: Xianbei
- Origin: name of a clan
- Derivation: an ethnic Xianbei clan of Xiongnu origin during the era of Sixteen Kingdoms

Other names
- Variant form: Yuwen (Mandarin)

The Yuwen (Chinese: 宇文; pinyin: Yǔwén < Eastern Han Chinese: *wa^{B}-mun < Old Chinese *waʔ-mən) is a Chinese compound surname which originated from a pre-state clan of Xianbei ethnicity of Xiongnu origin during the era of Sixteen Kingdoms in China, until its destruction by Former Yan's prince Murong Huang in 345. Among the eastern Xianbei clans that ranged from the central part of the present day Liaoning province and eastward, Yuwen clan was the largest, and was awarded the position of the leader of eastern Xianbei (東部大人) by Chinese rulers. A descendant of the Yuwen tribe, Yuwen Tai, established the Northern Zhou dynasty in the 6th century.

Yuanhe Xingzuan "The register of the great families from the Yuanhe reign (806-820)" vol. 6, the Yuwen part 2 records:

(宇文)本遼東南單于之後, 有普回因獵得玉璽, 以為天授. 鮮卑俗呼天子為宇文, 因號宇文氏.

(The Yuwen) originally were the descendants of the southern Shanyu (of the Xiongnu). Someone within them called Puhui got a jade seal when he was hunting. This was regarded as a sign of imperial enthronement from heaven. According to Xianbei tradition, the son of the heaven was called the Yuwen. Thus (Puhui) called himself the Yuwen.

Yuwen were descendants of the nomadic Xiongnu who assimilated into the Xianbei after 89 CE and ruled the Kumo Xi and Khitan (both Mongolic peoples) before being defeated by Murong Huang in 344, upon which Yuwen separated from the Kumo Xi and Khitan. The language of the Yuwen is thought to be Turkic or a very distant branch of Mongolic.

The Book of Wei vol. 103, Biography of Yuwen Mohuai of Xiongnu records:

匈奴宇文莫槐, 出於遼東塞外, 其先, 南單于之遠屬也, 世為東部大人. 其語與鮮卑頗異.

人皆翦髮而留其頂上, 以為首飾, 長過數寸則截短之. 婦女披長襦及足, 而無裳焉. 秋收

烏頭為毒藥, 以射禽獸.

Yuwen Mohuai of the Xiongnu was from Liaodong, the region beyond the northern border. His ancestor was a remote relative of the southern Shanyu. (The Yuwen) had been the chief of the eastern section (of the Xianbei) for many generations. The (Yuwen)'s language differed widely from the Xianbei's. (The Yuwen) people all had shaved hair, but the hair on top of the head was left as a decoration. When the hair was over some cun long, it would be cut short. The women had long robes, which draped from their shoulders to their feet, but (they) did not wear skirts. When autumn came, they collected Wutou as poison, and used it to shoot birds and beasts.

== Yuwen tribe ==
Under Yuwen Mona, the son of Yuwen Puhui, the Yuwen tribe moved south from the Yin Mountains and resided near the northwestern Chinese commandery of Liaoxi. By the time of Yuwen Mohuai, the Yuwen had grown into an influential power in the region, having formed a capital at Zimengchuan (紫蒙川, in present-day Chifeng, Inner Mongolia) and competing with their rival Xianbei tribes; the Murong and Duan. The Yuwen repeatedly fought with the Murong while establishing good relations with the Tuoba tribe in the east through marriage alliances. During the reign of Yuwen Mogui in 302, he claimed the title of chanyu and boasted a powerful army. That year, he launched a major attack on the Murong but was repelled.

Mogui was succeeded by his son, Yuwen Xiduguan, who expanded the state to the northern Gobi Desert. In 319, he allied with the Jin dynasty (266–420) Inspector of Pingzhou, Cui Bi to attack the Murong together with the Duan and Goguryeo. After the Duan and Goguryeo were tricked into withdrawing, the Yuwen pressed on and besieged the Murong capital at Jicheng (棘城, in modern Jinzhou, Liaoning). However, they suffered a catastrophic defeat in the end, prompting Xiduguan to sue for peace. In 325, his son and successor, Yuwen Qidegui launched another attack on the Murong, but was also defeated.

Qidegui was overthrown by his cousin, Yuwen Yidougui in 333. Later that year, the Murong fell into civil war after Murong Ren rebelled against his chieftain and brother, Murong Huang. The Yuwen, along with the Duan, supported Murong Ren and coordinated attacks against Murong Huang, but was ultimately unsuccessful. After Huang defeated Ren in 336, the Murong began rapidly expanding their power, establishing the Former Yan in 337 and subjugating the Duan, Buyeo and Goguryeo. In 344 (or 345), the Former Yan crushed the Yuwen's power base and forced Yidougui to flee, ending their independence.

A son of Yidougui, Yuwen Ling (宇文陵) survived and served under Former Yan and its successor, Later Yan, as an official. After the Later Yan capital, Zhongshan (中山, in modern Baoding, Hebei) fell to the Northern Wei dynasty in 398, he was moved to Wuchuan County in Dai Commandery, where his family would live for generations. One of Yuwen Ling's descendants was Yuwen Tai, who laid the foundation of the Northern Zhou dynasty (557–581) for his family to rule.

== People with this surname ==
- Yuwen Tai, paramount general of the Chinese/Xianbei state Western Wei
- Yuwen Jue, First Emperor of Northern Zhou
- Yuwen Yu, Second Emperor of Northern Zhou
- Yuwen Yong, Third Emperor of Northern Zhou
- Yuwen Yun, Fourth Emperor of Northern Zhou
- Yuwen Yan, Fifth and Last Emperor of Northern Zhou
- Yuwen Huaji, general of the Sui Dynasty
- Yuwen Rong, official and Chancellor of the Tang Dynasty,
- Yuwen Jie, official and Chancellor of the Tang Dynasty,
- Yuwen Shu, official and general of the Sui Dynasty
- Yuwen Shiji, official of the Sui Dynasty and Chancellor of the Tang Dynasty
- Yuwen Xian, official and general of Northern Zhou
- Yuwen Hu, regent of the Xianbei dynasty Northern Zhou
- Yuwen Suo'an (宇文所安), the Chinese name of the sinologist Stephen Owen

== Chieftains of the Yuwen ==
Family names and given name	Durations of reigns
Chinese convention: use family name and given name
Yuwen Mohuai (宇文莫槐)	260–293
Yuwen Puhui (宇文普回)	293 – late 3rd century
Yuwen Qiubuqin (宇文丘不勤)	late 3rd century
Yuwen Mogui (宇文莫圭)	late 3rd century (299?) – early 4th century (302?)
Yuwen Xiduguan (宇文悉獨官)	early 4th century
Yuwen Qidegui (宇文乞得歸)	early 4th century – 333
Yuwen Yidougui (宇文逸豆歸)	333–345

== See also ==
- Ethnic groups in Chinese history
- Five Barbarians
- Murong
- Northern Zhou
- Xianbei
- Xiongnu
