= Former Yan =

Murong-Xianbei state (337–370) during the Sixteen Kingdoms period

Yan 燕
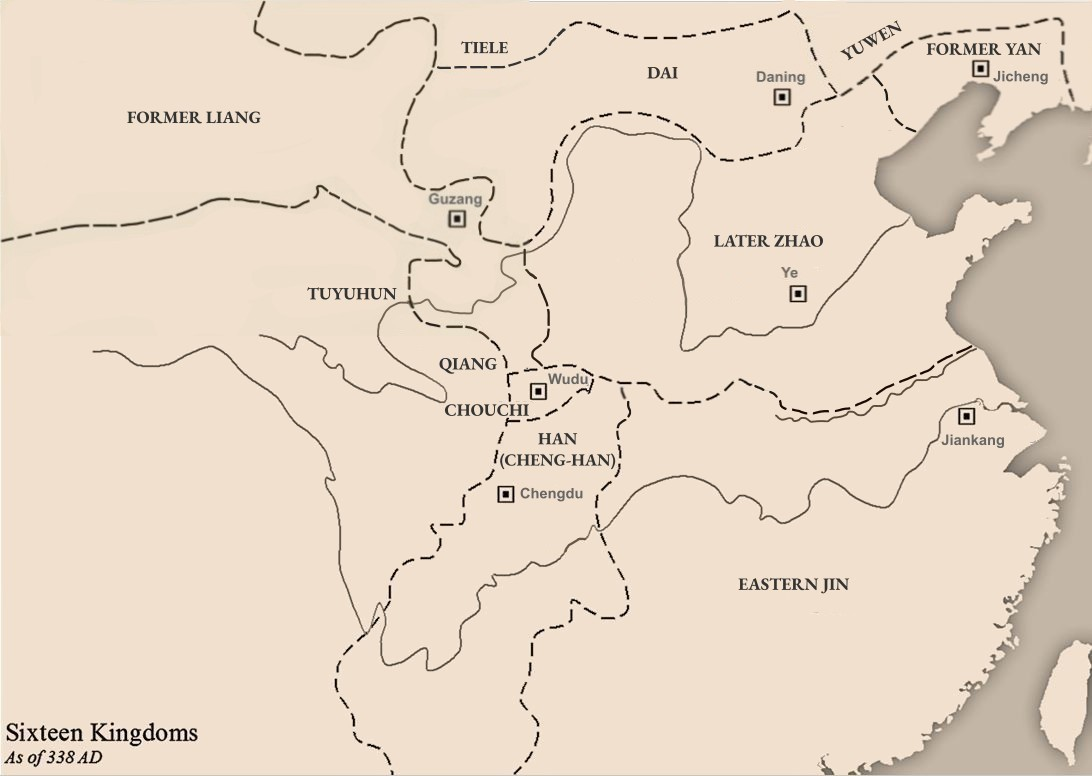
- Former Yan in 338 AD

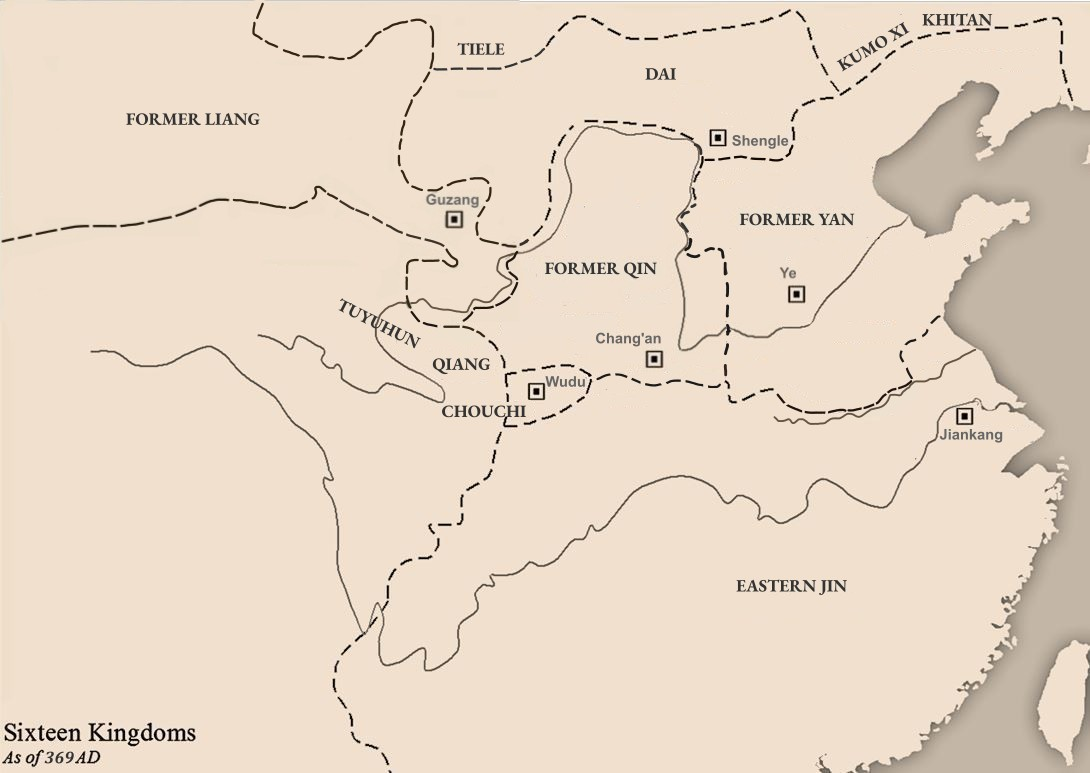
- Former Yan in 369 AD
- Capital: Jicheng (棘城) (337–342); Longcheng (342–350); Jicheng (薊城) (350–357); Yecheng (357–370)
- Government: Monarchy
- Emperor
  - 337–348: Murong Huang
  - 348–360: Murong Jun
  - 360–370: Murong Wei
- History
  - Murong Huang's claim of princely title: 23 November 337
  - Murong Jun's claim of imperial title: 4 January 353
  - Fall of Yecheng: 11 December 370
  - Disestablished: 370
Preceded by
Jin dynasty (266–420)
Ran Wei
Later Zhao
Duan Qi
Succeeded by
Former Qin
- Today part of: China

Yan, known in historiography as the Former Yan (Chinese: 前燕; pinyin: Qián Yān; 337–370), was a dynastic state of China ruled by the Murong clan of the Xianbei during the Sixteen Kingdoms period. From Liaoning, the Former Yan later conquered and ruled over Hebei, Shaanxi, Shandong and Henan at its peak. They were notably the first of several Xianbei states to have establish their rule over the Central Plains. The prefix of "Former" is used in historiography to distinguish them from the other Yan states that came after them, such as Later Yan.

Initially, Murong Huang and his son Murong Jun claimed the Eastern Jin-created title "Prince of Yan", but subsequently, in 352, after seizing most of the former Later Zhao territory, Murong Jun would declare himself emperor, and after that point, the rulers of the Former Yan declared themselves "emperors". The Yan changed their capital from time to time, with their last capital, Ye being the most prestigious, due to its status as a major population hub.

== History ==
=== Background ===
A gold Buyao crown found in a tomb from the Former Yan (337–370). The Buyao was a Chinese headdress that gained popularity among the Murong rulers and their people. According to one account, the Murong (慕容) name was derived from the word Buyao (步搖).

The Murong, named after their chieftain of the same name, were a prominent Xianbei tribe under Tanshihuai's confederation during the late-2nd century. After the confederation disbanded, the Murong chief, Mohuba led his people to migrate into the Chinese interior and settled down in Liaoxi Commandery. When the Cao Wei general, Sima Yi campaigned against the Liaodong warlord, Gongsun Yuan in 237, the Murong lent their assistance and was allowed to move into northern Liaodong for their contributions. The Murong also aided the Wei in their war against the Koreanic kingdom of Goguryeo and continued to render service to the Western Jin dynasty.

In the late reign of Emperor Wu of Jin, the Murong rebelled and launched raids on the northeastern frontier. In 285, Murong Hui was installed as chieftain. He was previously forced into exile by a powerful uncle, who usurped power over the tribe after the death of his father, and only returned after his people had his uncle killed. Murong Hui continued to wage war, but in 289, he submitted back to the Jin, who pardoned him and appointed him Commander of the Xianbei. Murong Hui then led his tribes to settle down at Jicheng (棘城, in modern Jinzhou, Liaoning) and began openly embracing sinicization. He encouraged his followers to adopt agriculture, and modelled his government after the Chinese-style of bureaucracy.

During the fall of Western Jin, Murong Hui declared himself as the Grand Chanyu in 307. At the same time, many Chinese refugees fleeing the chaos of the Central Plains were also seeking refuge in his territory. Murong Hui accommodated them by setting up new commanderies based on their hometowns while recruiting scholar-officials among them into his administration. Murong Hui's autonomy grew as the imperial court was driven out to the south by the Han-Zhao and Later Zhao, but still considered himself as a subject of Jin, eventually becoming their last remaining vassal in the north. In 318, the Eastern Jin court at Jiankang acknowledged his service and enfeoffed him as the Duke of Changli. Hui declined the title, though later accepted the Duke of Liaodong in 321. Throughout his reign, Murong Hui defended his domain from Goguryeo, as well as from his rival Xianbei tribes, the Duan and Yuwen.

=== Reign of Murong Huang ===
Before his death in 333, Murong Hui had appointed Murong Huang, his eldest son through his principal wife, as his heir. This was an attempt to establish the Chinese succession rule of primogeniture, as opposed to the traditional elective system of the Xianbei, where power was usually passed on to the most capable male member. Despite his wishes, primogeniture struggled to gain recognition among his clan members, an issue that would plague the Murong throughout the period. Powerful brothers, uncles and cousins often coveted or were suspected of planning to usurp power, using the traditional system as their basis of claim. Immediately after succeeding his father, Murong Huang's brothers challenged his claim and split their domain into two.

In 337, after finally defeating his brothers, Murong Huang claimed the title of Prince of Yan with the backing of his officials. Most historians regard this event as the start of the Former Yan dynasty, though Murong Huang never explicitly declared independence and continued to present himself as a Jin vassal throughout his lifetime. Soon after, he embarked on a policy of rapid expansion. The following year, in alliance with the Later Zhao, they jointly conquered the Duan tribe of Liaoxi. The Zhao subsequently turned on Murong Huang, but he was able to repel a massive invasion and launched raids deep into their territory. Murong Huang's success allowed him to pressure the Jin court into formally recognizing his princely title in 341. In 342, he shifted his capital to Longcheng, and later that year, he invaded Goguryeo and sacked their capital at Hwando, forcing them into submission. In 344, he destroyed the power of the Yuwen tribe in the north. Finally, in 346, his forces attacked the Korean kingdom of Buyeo and captured their king. Murong Huang's campaigns solidified the Former Yan as the undisputed power in the northeast. He was also emboldened to abolish the Eastern Jin era names within his territory in 345, instead claiming that they were now in the 12th year of his reign since he first succeeded his father.

=== Reign of Murong Jun ===
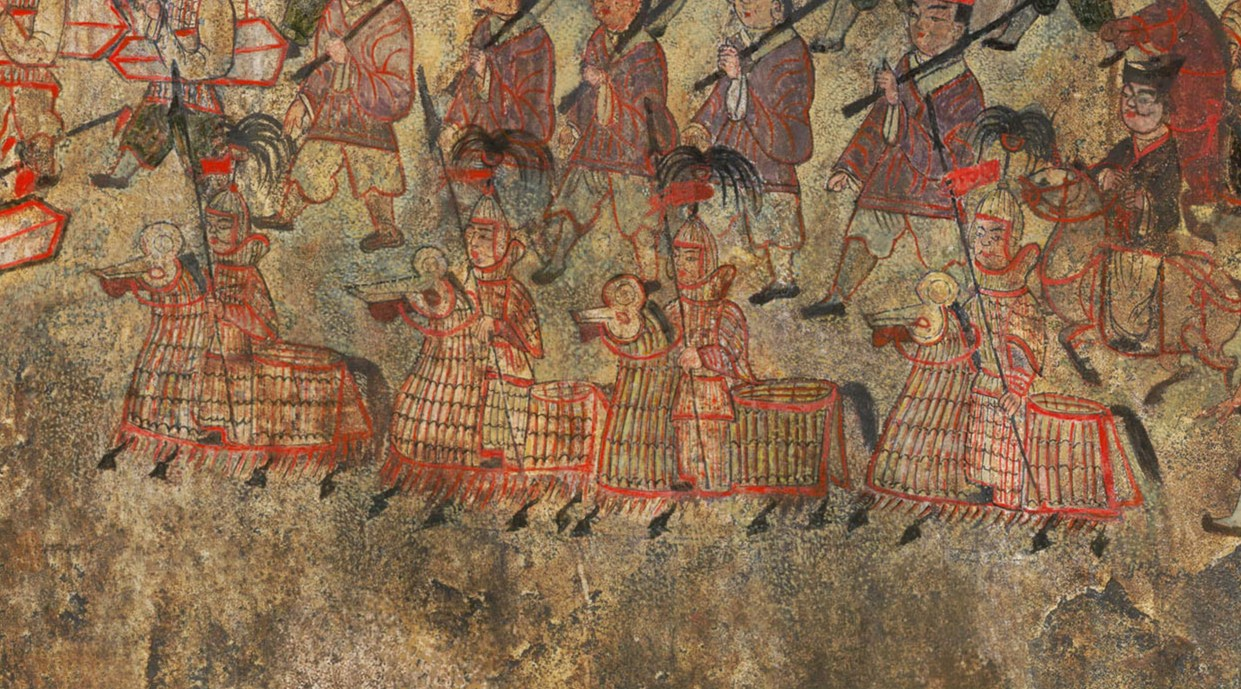
Painting of heavy cavalry (cataphracts) from the 4th-century tomb of Dong Shou, a Former Yan general who fled to Goguryeo.

Murong Huang died in 348, and the throne was passed smoothly to his eldest son, Murong Jun. The next year, the Later Zhao, who controlled much of northern China, descended into fratricidal civil war. At the advice of his council, Murong Jun amassed a large force and began an invasion of the Central Plains. The fractured Later Zhao forces were unable to stop the Former Yan's advances, and in 350, Murong Jun captured Jìcheng (薊城; modern day Beijing) and made it his new capital. The Yan soon came into conflict with Ran Min, a powerful commander who had destroyed the imperial Zhao clan and taken control of central Hebei as Emperor of Ran Wei. In 352, Murong Jun's brother, Murong Ke faced Ran Min at the Battle of Liantai. Through the use of superior cavalry, Murong Ke was able to capture Ran Min in battle. A few months later, Wei's remaining forces at Ye surrendered to Former Yan.

With a foothold on the North China Plain, Murong Jun declared himself at the Emperor of Yan in 353, effectively breaking away from the Eastern Jin. He continued to entrust Murong Ke with clearing the remnants of the Later Zhao, mainly the various local lords of fortified manors and the Duan Qi state in Shandong. As the situation became more stabilized, Murong Jun moved his capital to Ye in 357. His state was rivalled by the Di-led Former Qin in the northwest, and the Eastern Jin in the south. Murong Jun had plans to conquer the Jin and aimed to mobilize an army of 1.5 million strong. However, before he could realize his ambitions, he suddenly fell deathly ill and died in 360.

=== Reign of Murong Wei ===
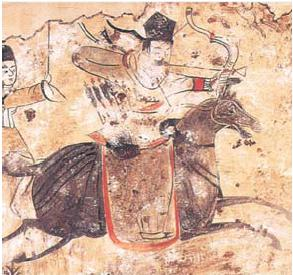
Painting depicting a Murong horse archer in a hunting scene from a tomb of the Former Yan (337–370).

Murong Jun's eldest son and heir, Murong Wei was still a child at the time of his death. Fearing that his brother would use his influence to usurp power, Murong Jun offered to peacefully pass over the throne to Murong Ke. However, Murong Ke refused, and instead agreed to serve as co-regents alongside three other ministers for Murong Wei. After Murong Wei ascended the throne, Murong Ke gained considerable control over government and military affairs, but remained highly respectful towards his nephew. Traditional historians often praise him as one of the best statesman and commander of his era. In 365, he brought the empire to its peak by capturing the ancient capital of Luoyang from the Jin. Around this time, the Former Yan also began to claim their imperial legitimacy from the Later Zhao rather than Jin. Within the Five Virtues Cycle, they adopted the element of Wood, generated from the Zhao's Water.

Murong Ke ruled diligently throughout his regency, but when he too died of illness in 367, issues within the Yan government immediately began to spring up. His uncle, Murong Ping succeeded him as regent over Murong Wei, but quickly proved himself to be corrupt. The imperial treasury was also exhausted, leaving many public grain stores empty and officials with unpaid salaries. It was later discovered that a significant portion of the household population was being concealed by the Yan nobility in their private fiefs and estates, where they avoided paying taxes to the state. Within the imperial family, suspicion was directed towards Murong Chui, another brother of Murong Jun and Murong Ke, who was an accomplished general in his own right, but also ambitious.

In 369, the Jin commander, Huan Wen led a massive expeditionary force to subjugate the Yan. As Huan Wen drew closer, the Yan court was thrown into panic and requested aid from the Former Qin, offering them the Luoyang region in return. Eventually, Murong Chui volunteered to lead the defense, and at the Battle of Fangtou, he and the Qin reinforcements dealt Huan Wen a decisive defeat, forcing him to retreat. After the crisis was averted, however, the Yan refused to cede the land they promised to Qin. Furthermore, Murong Ping became apprehensive of Murong Chui's newfound influence and plotted to eliminate him. Murong Chui and his family managed to escape to Qin, where they were welcomed by the Heavenly King, Fu Jian. With Yan deprived of their top general, Fu Jian ordered his Prime Minister, Wang Meng to lead an army into their territory. In 370, Wang Meng fought Murong Ping at the Battle of Luchuan and crushed the main Yan force. The Qin army soon entered Ye, putting Murong Wei to flight. After being captured by pursuing forces, Murong Wei formally gave his surrender to Fu Jian, thus ending the Former Yan dynasty.

The Murong clan were treated as honoured prisoners under the Former Qin and were even allowed to serve in their administration. As the Former Qin collapsed following the Battle of Fei River in 383, Murong Huang's descendants led several movements to restore the fallen Yan empire, namely the Later Yan (384–407/409) by Murong Chui, the Western Yan (384–394) by Murong Wei's brother, Murong Hong, and the Southern Yan (398–410) by another son of Murong Huang, Murong De.

== Rulers of the Former Yan ==
Temple names	Posthumous names	Family names and given name	Durations of reigns	Era names and their according durations
Chinese convention: use family and given names
Taizu (太祖 Taìzǔ)	Wenming (文明 Wénmíng)	慕容皝 Mùróng Huǎng	337–348	Yanwang (燕王 Yànwáng) 337–348
Liezong (烈宗 Lièzōng)	Jingzhao (景昭 Jǐngzhāo)	慕容儁 Mùróng Jùn	348–360	Yanwang (燕王 Yànwáng) 348–353; Yuanxi (元璽 Yuánxǐ) 353–357; Guangshou (光壽 Guāngshoù) 357–360
Did not exist	You (幽 Yōu)	慕容暐 Mùróng Wěi	360–370	Jianxi (建熙 Jiànxī) 360–370

== See also ==
- Xianbei
- List of past Chinese ethnic groups
- Wu Hu
