= Duan Jifei =

Duan Jifei (Chinese: 段季妃) was an empress of the Xianbei-led Chinese Southern Yan dynasty. Her husband was the founding emperor Murong De (Emperor Xianwu). Her given name is lost to history, but her courtesy name Jifei was recorded and used by historians. Her father was Duan Yi (段儀).

Duan Jifei's older sister Duan Yuanfei was the empress of Murong De's older brother, Murong Chui, the founding emperor of Later Yan. She married Murong De in or slightly before 388, when he was the Prince of Fanyang. They did not have any sons.

In 398, Murong De, displeased at how Murong Chui's son and successor Murong Bao had, through incompetence, lost most of the Later Yan territory, declared himself the Prince of Yan and established the separate Southern Yan state. In 400, he declared himself emperor and created Duan Jifei empress. After Murong De died in 405 and was succeeded by his nephew Murong Chao, she became empress dowager, but in 406 became embroiled in a plot with Murong Zhong (慕容鍾) the Prince of Beidi and the generals Murong Fa (慕容法) and Duan Hong (段宏) to overthrow Murong Chao, but after one of the coconspirators, Feng Song (封嵩) was arrested, she became fearful and revealed the entire plot to Murong Chao, who then defeated the coup attempt.

The 406 plot was the last reference to Empress Dowager Duan in history. In 408, after Murong Chao ransomed his mother Lady Duan back from Later Qin, he honored his mother as empress dowager, implying that Empress Dowager Duan Jifei might not be still alive at that point, or was deprived of her empress dowager title. (There was a reference in the Zizhi Tongjian that stated, "Empress Dowager Duan of Yan's title was removed, and she went to reside in a different palace"; the modern Chinese historian Bo Yang opined that referred to Later Yan's Empress Dowager Duan.)

== Notes and references ==
- Book of Jin, vol. 96.
- Zizhi Tongjian, vols. 108, 111, 114.

Chinese royalty
| New dynasty | Princess/Empress of Southern Yan; 398–405 | Succeeded by Empress Huyan |
| Preceded by Empress Wang Shen'ai of Jin | Empress of China (Shandong); 399–405 | Succeeded by Empress Huyan |
| Preceded by Empress Duan of Later Yan | Empress of China (Huatai region); 398–399 | Succeeded by Empress Murong of Northern Wei |
