= 391 =

391 in various calendars
Gregorian calendar	391; CCCXCI
Ab urbe condita	1144
Assyrian calendar	5141
Balinese saka calendar	312–313
Bengali calendar	−203 – −202
Berber calendar	1341
Buddhist calendar	935
Burmese calendar	−247
Byzantine calendar	5899–5900
Chinese calendar	庚寅年 (Metal Tiger); 3088 or 2881 — to — 辛卯年 (Metal Rabbit); 3089 or 2882
Coptic calendar	107–108
Discordian calendar	1557
Ethiopian calendar	383–384
Hebrew calendar	4151–4152
- Hindu calendars
Vikram Samvat	447–448
Shaka Samvat	312–313
Kali Yuga	3491–3492
Holocene calendar	10391
Iranian calendar	231 BP – 230 BP
Islamic calendar	238 BH – 237 BH
Javanese calendar	274–275
Julian calendar	391; CCCXCI
Korean calendar	2724
Minguo calendar	1521 before ROC 民前1521年
Nanakshahi calendar	−1077
Seleucid era	702/703 AG
Thai solar calendar	933–934
Tibetan calendar	ལྕགས་ཕོ་སྟག་ལོ་ (male Iron-Tiger); 517 or 136 or −636 — to — ལྕགས་མོ་ཡོས་ལོ་ (female Iron-Hare); 518 or 137 or −635

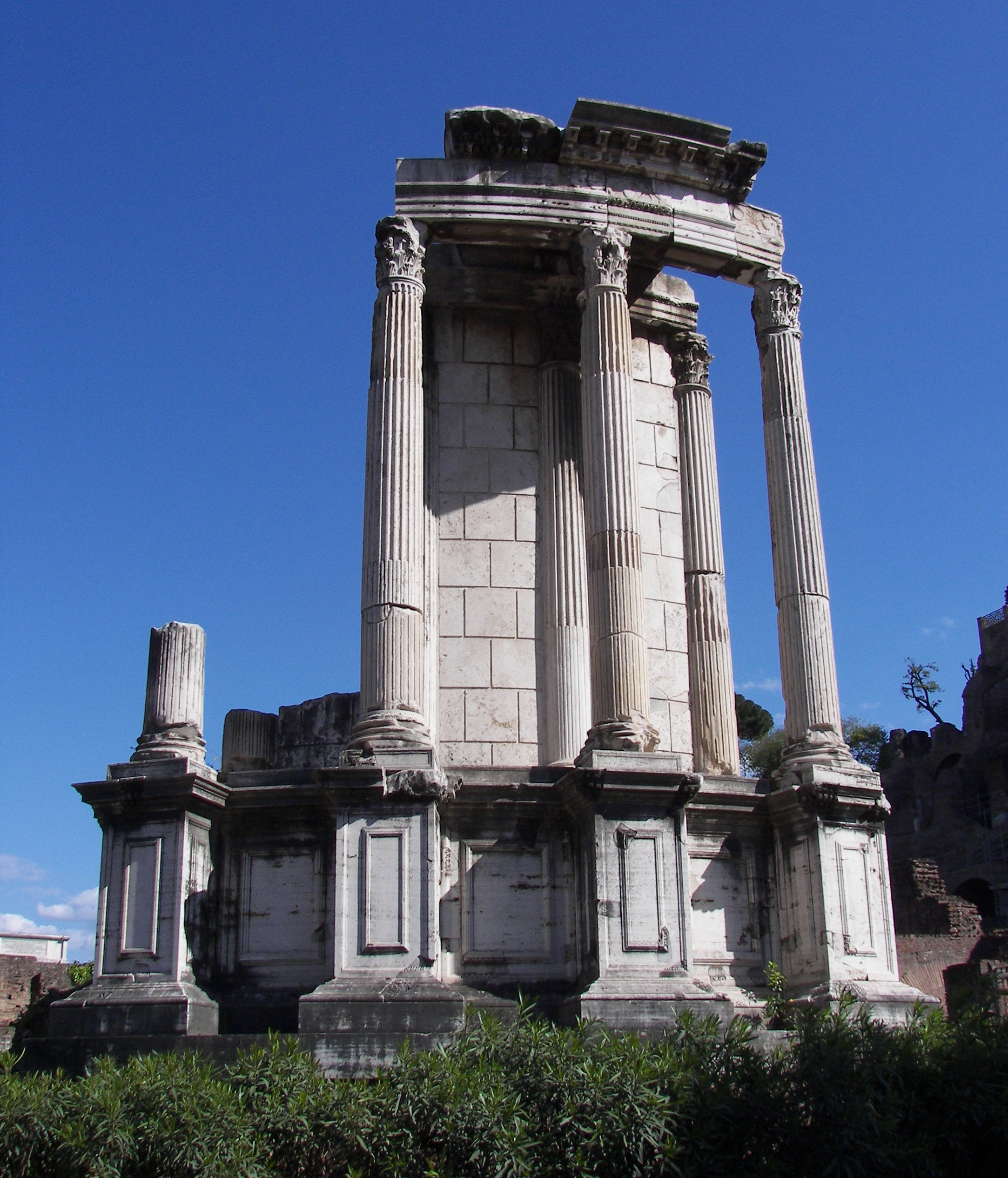
The Temple of Vesta (Rome)

Year 391 (CCCXCI) was a common year starting on Wednesday of the Julian calendar. At the time, it was known as the Year of the Consulship of Tatianus and Symmachus (or, less frequently, year 1144 Ab urbe condita). The denomination 391 for this year has been used since the early medieval period, when the Anno Domini calendar era became the prevalent method in Europe for naming years.

== Events ==
=== By place ===
==== Roman Empire ====
- Emperor Theodosius I establishes Christianity as the official state religion. All non-Christian temples in the Roman Empire are closed. The eternal fire in the Temple of Vesta at the Roman Forum is extinguished, and the Vestal Virgins are disbanded.
- Quintus Aurelius Symmachus, urban prefect of Rome, pleads for traditional cult practices. He petitions Theodosius I to re-open the pagan temples, but is opposed by Ambrose.
- Saint Telemachus dies after being stoned to death. His date of death is also given to the year 404.

==== Asia ====
- A Rouran chief named Heduohan (曷多汗) is defeated and killed in battle against the Tuoba Northern Wei Dynasty. Surviving Rouran move west towards the Gaoche, led by Heduohan's brother and successor, Shelun.
- King Gwanggaeto the Great of Goguryeo (Korea) ascends to the throne.

=== By topic ===
==== Literature ====
- Flames destroy the great Library of Alexandria, established in the Mouseion in the fourth century BC. Among the items lost in the fire are works of science, including parchments by the Greek astronomer Aristarchus of Samos asserting that the Earth orbits the Sun, and dozens of dramatic works by Euripides and Sophocles.

==== Religion ====
- Patriarch Theophilus destroys all pagan temples in Alexandria under orders from Theodosius I. Christians go on an iconoclastic rampage, smashing religious symbols or monuments through the city and destroying the Temple of Serapis. The "Order of Monks" known as the Parabalani take charge of patrolling the streets.

== Births ==
- Flavius Aetius, Roman general (Magister militum) of part Gothic heritage. (d.454)

== Deaths ==
- Heduohan, chief of the Rouran tribes (killed in battle against the Northern Wei)
- Justina, Roman empress (approximate date)
- Macarius of Egypt, Christian monk and hermit
- Peter of Sebaste, bishop of Armenia
- Zhai Liao "Heavenly Prince" (Tian Wang), founder of the Dingling state Wei
