= Empress Xianyou =

Chinese empress dowager (d. 402)

Empress Dowager Ding (丁太后, personal name unknown) (died 402), formally Empress Xianyou (獻幽皇后, literally "the wise and lonely empress") was an empress dowager of the Xianbei-ruled Later Yan dynasty of China. She was a concubine of Murong Bao (Emperor Huimin) and the mother of Murong Sheng (Emperor Zhaowu).

== Life ==
She gave birth to Murong Sheng while Murong Bao was serving as a low-level Former Qin official, in 373. What happened to her during the next three decades were not clear, but at the time when Murong Bao, then emperor of Later Yan, and Murong Sheng were fleeing from rebellions in 398, she was at the capital Longcheng (龍城, in modern Jinzhou, Liaoning). At this time, she was carefully served by her daughter-in-law Princess Lan, despite the fact that Longcheng was under the control of Princess Lan's father Lan Han, who would set a trap for Murong Bao and have him killed later that year, and then claim the throne. Murong Sheng was spared, however, because he was Lan Han's son-in-law, and he soon overthrew Lan Han in a coup and reestablished Later Yan as its emperor.

He did not initially honor her as empress dowager, as that honor belonged to Murong Bao's wife Empress Duan, but he did honor her with the title Empress Xianzhuang. After Empress Dowager Duan died in 400, he honored her as empress dowager. Because of how Princess Lan protected both her and Murong Sheng, when Murong Sheng considered executing her as the daughter of a traitor, Empress Dowager Ding greatly opposed it, and Princess Lan was spared, although she would never be empress.

Sometime during Murong Sheng's reign, Empress Dowager Ding started an affair with Murong Bao's younger brother, Murong Xi the Duke of Hejian—who was 12 years her son Murong Sheng's junior. After Murong Sheng was assassinated in a failed coup attempt in 401, she therefore forced the officials to bypass both Murong Sheng's son, Murong Ding (慕容定) the Crown Prince, and Murong Sheng's younger brother Murong Yuan (慕容元) the Duke of Pingyuan, whom most officials favored.

Empress Dowager Ding's affair with Murong Xi continued. However, in 402, Murong Xi took two daughters of the official Fu Mo (苻謨) -- Fu Song'e and Fu Xunying as concubines, and favored them greatly—particularly Fu Xunying. By comparison, his affair with Empress Dowager Ding cooled off, and she became angry. She plotted with her nephew Ding Xin (丁信) to depose Murong Xi and replace him with another younger brother of her son, Murong Yuan (慕容淵, note different character than his brother) the Duke of Zhangwu. The plot was discovered, and Murong Xi executed Ding Xin and Murong Yuan and forced Empress Dowager Ding to commit suicide, but still buried her with honors due to being an empress.
