= Empress Duan (Huimin) =

Empress Duan (段皇后, personal name unknown) (died 400), formally Empress Huide (惠德皇后, literally 'the benevolent and virtuous empress'), was an empress of the Xianbei-led Later Yan dynasty of China. Her husband was Murong Bao (Emperor Huimin).

Based on her family name, Empress Duan was probably from the same Duan tribe royal line that a number of Former Yan and Later Yan empresses and imperial consorts came from. Murong Bao created her empress in 396 after he became emperor. Little is known about her life during the next few years, when Murong Bao saw his empire collapse in light of attacks by Northern Wei and internal rebellions, and he was killed in a rebellion by Lan Han in 398, along with her son Murong Ce (慕容策) the crown prince. Lan spared her, however, and after Murong Bao's son by his concubine Consort Ding, Murong Sheng, killed Lan and became emperor, he honored her as empress dowager. She died in early 400.

Chinese royalty
| Preceded by Empress Duan Yuanfei | Empress of Later Yan; 396–398 | Succeeded by Empress Fu Xunying |
| Preceded by Empress Duan Yuanfei | Empress of China (Liaoning); 396–398 | Succeeded by Empress Fu Xunying |
| Preceded by Empress Duan Yuanfei | Empress of China (Hebei); 396–397 | Succeeded by Empress Murong of Northern Wei |
| Preceded by Empress Duan Yuanfei | Empress of China (Shanxi); 396 | Succeeded by Empress Murong of Northern Wei |
| Preceded by Empress Duan Yuanfei | Empress of China (Huatai region); 396–398 | Succeeded by Empress Duan Jifei of Southern Yan |
