= Zhai Zhao =

Zhai Zhao 翟釗
- Heavenly King of Wei

Heavenly King of Zhai Wei
- Reign: 391–392
- Predecessor: Zhai Liao
- Born: Unknown
- Died: 393
Full name
- Family name: Zhái (翟); Given name: Zhāo (釗)
Era name and dates
- Dìngdǐng (定鼎): 391–392
Regnal name
- Heavenly King of Wei (魏天王)
- Dynasty: Zhai Wei

Zhai Zhao (Chinese: 翟釗; died 393) was the second and last monarch of the Dingling-led Chinese Zhai Wei dynasty. During his reign, he used the monarchical title of Heavenly King.

Zhai Zhao's father Zhai Liao had, after rebelling against Eastern Jin dynasty in 386, held a swath of territory near the Yellow River in modern Henan. In 387, he sent Zhao Zhao to attack Jin's Chenliu (陳留, roughly modern Kaifeng, Henan) and Yinchuan (潁川, roughly modern Xuchang, Henan) commanderies, but Jin general Zhu Xu (朱序) repelled his attack. Later that year, under pressure from Later Yan's emperor Murong Chui, Zhai Liao briefly submitted to Later Yan, but in winter 387 again rebelled. In 388, he tried to reconcile with Later Yan, but after Murong Chui turned down his overture, declared an independent Wei state.

In 390, the Jin general Liu Laozhi (劉牢之) attacked Zhai Zhao, who was then defending the city of Juancheng (鄄城, in modern Puyang, Henan), forcing Zhai Zhao to abandon Juancheng and flee back to his father's capital Huatai (滑台, in modern Anyang, Henan). Liu then defeated Zhai Liao in battle as well, but did not destroy Wei.

In 391, Zhai Liao died, and Zhai Zhao succeeded him as the Heavenly King. Zhai Zhao soon attempted to attack Later Yan's important city Yecheng, but was repelled by Murong Chui's son Murong Nong.

In 392, Murong Chui personally attacked Zhai Zhao, heading for his capital Huatai. Zhai Zhao sought aid from Western Yan's emperor Murong Yong, but Murong Yong, believing that Zhai Zhao could wear Later Yan out without his aid, refused. Murong Chui then pretended to build rafts to ready to cross the Yellow River, and Zhai Zhao tried to attack his flotilla—when Murong Chui's general Murong Zhen (慕容鎮) crossed the river at a different spot and camped in. Zhai Zhao tried to attack both places, but his army was worn out and completely collapsed. Zhai Zhao fled by himself to Western Yan.

In 393, he tried to incite a coup against Murong Yong and was killed.
