= Empress Dowager Duan =

Empress Dowager Duan is the name of:

- Empress Dowager Duan (Zhaowen), mother of Murong Xi, emperor of Later Yan
- Empress Dowager Duan (Murong Chao), mother of Murong Chao, emperor of Southern Yan
