= Murong Xi =

Emperor Zhaowen of Later Yan 後燕昭文帝

Ruler of Later Yan
- Reign: September 14, 401 – September 16, 407
- Predecessor: Murong Sheng
- Successor: Gao Yun (Northern Yan)
- Born: 385
- Died: September 16, 407 (aged 21–22)
- Burial: Huiping Mausoleum (徽平陵)
Full name
- Family name: Mùróng (慕容); Given name: Xī (熙)
Era dates
- Guāngshǐ (光始): 401–406; Jiànshǐ (建始): 407
Posthumous name
- Emperor Zhāowén (昭文皇帝, "accomplished and civil")
- House: Murong
- Dynasty: Later Yan

Murong Xi (Chinese: 慕容熙; 385–16 September 407), courtesy name Daowen (道文), also known by his posthumous name as the Emperor Zhaowen of Later Yan (後燕昭文帝), was an emperor of the Xianbei-led Later Yan dynasty of China. He was one of the youngest sons of Murong Chui (Emperor Wucheng), and after the death of his nephew Murong Sheng (Emperor Zhaowu) became emperor due to his affair with Murong Sheng's mother, Empress Dowager Ding. He was regarded as a cruel and capricious ruler, who acted at the whims of himself and his wife, Empress Fu Xunying, greatly damaging the Later Yan state. After Empress Fu died in 407, he left the capital Longcheng (龍城, in modern Jinzhou, Liaoning) to bury her, and the soldiers in Longcheng took this chance to rebel and replace him with Murong Bao's adopted son Murong Yun (Emperor Huiyi), and Murong Xi himself was captured and killed. (Because Murong Yun was an adopted son who later changed his surname back to "Gao", some historians regard Murong Xi as the last emperor of Later Yan and Gao Yun as the first emperor of Northern Yan, while others treat Gao Yun as the last emperor of Later Yan and his successor Feng Ba as the first emperor of Northern Yan.)

== Early life ==
Murong Xi was born in 385, to Murong Chui and his concubine Consort Duan, soon after Murong Chui had established Later Yan. In 393, Murong Chui created him the Prince of Hejian. He was one of Murong Chui's favored sons. Little else is known about his life during his father's reign.

== During Murong Bao's and Murong Sheng's reigns ==
After Murong Chui had died in 396 and been succeeded by Murong Xi's older brother Murong Bao (Emperor Huimin)), Later Yan came under heavy attack by Northern Wei's prince Tuoba Gui, and the capital Zhongshan (中山, in modern Baoding, Hebei) was sieged by Northern Wei forces. In 397, Murong Bao decided to abandon Zhongshan and move the capital to the old Former Yan capital Longcheng (龍城, in modern Jinzhou, Liaoning), and initially, due to their young ages, Murong Xi and his brothers Murong Lang (慕容朗) the Prince of Bohai and Murong Jian (慕容鑒) the Prince of Boling were unable to catch up with Murong Bao's group as it fled Zhongshan, requiring their older brother Murong Long the Prince of Gaoyang to return to fetch them, but they finally did catch up with Murong Bao and evacuate to Longcheng.

In 398, as Murong Bao's troops were worn out by constant wars and apprehensive of Murong Bao's orders to head south to attack Northern Wei, they mutinied under the command of the officer Duan Sugu (段速骨), who supported Murong Long's son Murong Chong (慕容崇) as figurehead. In the rebellion, many imperial princes were killed, but because Murong Xi and Murong Chong were friends, Murong Chong exerted his influence to have Murong Xi spared. Later in the year, after Duan was killed by Lan Han, who then laid a trap for Murong Bao and had him killed as well and usurped power, Lan Han created Murong Xi the Duke of Liaodong, with the function of having him continue the worship of the Murongs' ancestors. When Murong Bao's son Murong Sheng subsequently killed Lan Han in a coup in late 398 and restored Later Yan, he used only a princely title initially, so imperial princes' titles were reduced to ducal titles. In accordance, Murong Xi's title became Duke of Hejian. Murong Sheng also made him a major general. In 400, when Murong Sheng attacked Goguryeo, Murong Xi served as his forward general, and contributed greatly to the victory. It was at this time that Murong Sheng commented:

Uncle, your bravery matched that of Shizu (Murong Chui's temple name), but your strategies are not as well-thought out.

Sometime during Murong Sheng's reign, Murong Xi began an affair with Murong Sheng's mother Empress Dowager Ding. When Murong Sheng was assassinated in a coup in 401, the officials largely wanted a successor older than Murong Sheng's crown prince Murong Ding (慕容定), and most wanted to see Murong Sheng's younger brother Murong Yuán (慕容元) the Duke of Pingyuan. However, Empress Dowager Ding, because of her affair with Murong Xi, had other ideas, and she made it clear that she wanted Murong Xi to succeed her son. The officials were forced to go along with her wishes, and while Murong Xi formally offered the throne to Murong Yuan first, Murong Yuan did not dare to accept, and so Murong Xi accepted the throne. He used the title "Heavenly King" (Tian Wang).

== Reign ==
Murong Xi was cruel and arbitrary as a ruler, willing to strike out at anyone who disobeyed him or whom he viewed as a potential threat. The first victim was Murong Yuán, whom he ordered to commit suicide just a few days after he took the throne. When a plot involving the generals Murong Ti (慕容提) and Zhang Fo (張佛)'s attempt to put the former crown prince Murong Ding on the throne was discovered less a month later, Murong Xi ordered his young grandnephew to commit suicide as well.

In 402, Murong Xi took two daughters of the deceased official Fu Mo (苻謨) as concubines—Fu Song'e and Fu Xunying. He favored both greatly, and particularly Fu Xunying. He therefore neglected Empress Dowager Ding, who became jealous and angry, and she plotted with her nephew Ding Xin (丁信) to overthrow Murong Xi and replace him with Murong Bao's son Murong Yuān (慕容淵, note different tone from his brother) the Duke of Zhangwu. The plot was discovered, and Murong Xi executed Ding Xin and Murong Yuān and forced Empress Dowager Ding to commit suicide, although he still buried her with honors due an empress.

Murong Xi soon started a number of heavy construction projects. In 403, he built Longteng Chateau (龍騰苑) within his imperial garden, described as occupying over two square kilometers and requiring forced labor from 20,000 men. He further built an artificial hill within the chateau that was described as 500 steps wide and 57 meters high. Later that year, he honored his mother Consort Duan as empress dowager, and he created Consort Fu Xunying as empress.

In summer 404, Murong Xi built Xiaoyao Palace (逍遙宮) at Longteng Chateau, with hundreds of rooms, and also constructed an artificial lake. The soldiers used as labor could not get any rest, and it was described that more than half of them died from the heat and the exhaustion.

In fall 404, Consort Fu Song'e grew ill. The physician Wang Rong (王榮) claimed that he could cure her, but ultimately he could not, and she died. Murong Xi tied Wang to a palace gate and executed him by drawing and quartering, and then burned his body. He posthumously honored Consort Fu as Empress Min.

After Consort Fu's death, Murong Xi grew even more doting of Empress Fu, who favored huntings and journeys. In winter 404, they went on a long hunt and tour that took them as north as Bailu Mountain (白鹿山, in modern Tongliao, Inner Mongolia), as east as Qingling (青嶺, described as about 100 kilometers east of the capital Longcheng (龍城, in modern Jinzhou, Liaoning)), and as south as Haiyang (海陽, in modern Qinhuangdao, Hebei) before returning to Longcheng. On this winter journey, it was described that more than 5,000 escorting soldiers died from attacks by tigers or wolves or exposure to the cold. In other known events, she was described to be demanding to have jellied fish in the summer and fresh Rehmannia roots in the winter—neither of which could be obtainable—and Murong Xi executed officials in charge of supplying the palace for their failures.

In spring 405, Murong Xi, with Empress Fu with him, attacked Goguryeo's major city Liaodong (遼東, in modern Liaoyang, Liaoning), and had almost captured it. However, he ordered his soldiers to flatten the wall so that he could enter with Empress Fu on an imperial wagon. The delay allowed the Goguryeo forces to refortify the city, and he was unable to capture it.

Around the new year 406, Murong Xi, with Empress Fu with him, was making a surprise attack on Khitan tribes when he decided that the Khitan were too strong to be attacked and wanted to withdraw. However, at Empress Fu's insistence that she wanted to observe a battle, he abandoned his heavy guard and took his faster cavalry to attack Goguryeo. The attack was unsuccessful, and he was forced to withdraw. The general Murong Yun the Duke of Xiyang (Murong Bao's adopted son, whose original name was Gao Yun) suffered an arrow wound during the battle, and, because he feared Murong Xi's cruelty, used this opportunity to resign his post and remain in his home.

In 407, Murong Xi built a new palace for Empress Fu, Chenghua Palace (承華殿), using so much dirt in the project that dirt was described to become as expensive as grain. In summer 407, Empress Fu died. Murong Xi mourned her so much that, after having sex with her corpse, he ordered that a magnificent tomb be built for her, and also forced his sister-in-law, Princess Zhang of Gaoyang (Murong Long's wife) to commit suicide so that she could be buried with Empress Fu. The officials were all forced to weep for Empress Fu, with those who could not shed tears punished severely, so they put spicy food in their mouths to stimulate tear production. Eventually, Murong Xi accompanied Empress Fu's funeral procession out of Longcheng.

After Murong Xi left Longcheng, the general Feng Ba and his brother Feng Sufu (馮素弗), who had hidden themselves since Murong Xi had previously wanted to have them executed, conspired with their cousin Feng Wani (馮萬泥) to start a rebellion. They did so with the help with the general Zhang Xing (張興) and those who had previously conspired with the general Fu Jin (苻進) in a failed coup attempt earlier that year. Because Feng Ba was friendly with Murong Yun, he persuaded Murong Yun to become their leader, and they quickly captured the palace and closed the city gates. Murong Yun was declared the Heavenly King.

Murong Xi returned to Longcheng and settled in outside, at Longteng Chateau, preparing an assault on the city. At this time, the imperial guard soldier Chu Tou (褚頭) fled to him and informed him that the imperial guards were ready to turn against Murong Yun as soon as Murong Xi attacked. However, for reasons unknown, Murong Xi panicked at this news and fled. His general Murong Ba (慕容拔) tried to maintain the assault against Longcheng and was initially successful, but as the troops began to realize that Murong Xi had fled, they collapsed, and Murong Ba was killed by Feng Ba's soldiers.

Later that day, Murong Xi was found, wearing civilian clothes, in a forest, and he was captured and delivered to Murong Yun. Murong Yun personally read him his crimes, and then beheaded him and his sons.

== Personal information ==
- Father
  - Murong Chui (Emperor Wucheng)
- Mother
  - Consort Duan
- Wife
  - Empress Fu Xunying (created 402, d. 407)
- Major Concubines
  - Consort Fu Song'e (d. 404), Empress Fu's older sister, posthumously honored as Empress Min

Emperor Zhaowen of (Later) Yan House of Murong Born: 385 Died: 407
Regnal titles
Preceded by Murong Sheng	Emperor of Later Yan; 401–407	Succeeded by Gao Yun as Emperor of Northern Yan
Titles in pretence
Preceded by Murong Bao	— TITULAR — Emperor of China; 401–407; Reason for succession failure: Sixteen Kingdoms	Succeeded by Gao Yun
