= Murong Chao =

Murong Chao 慕容超

Emperor of Southern Yan
- Reign: September 19, 405 – March 25, 410
- Predecessor: Murong De
- Born: 385
- Died: 410 (aged 24–25); Jiankang, Eastern Jin
Full name
- Family name: Mùróng (慕容); Given name: Chāo (超)
Era name and dates
- Tàishàng (太上): September 19, 405 – March 25, 410
- House: Murong
- Dynasty: Southern Yan

Murong Chao (Chinese: 慕容超; 385–410), courtesy name Zuming (祖明), was the second and last emperor of the Xianbei-led Chinese Southern Yan dynasty. He was the nephew of the founding emperor Murong De (Emperor Xianwu) who was trapped under the rule of the Later Qin dynasty, but was welcomed to the Southern Yan after his uncle found out about his existence. Because Murong De had no surviving sons, Murong Chao inherited his throne after his death in 405. Initially considered able, Murong Chao turned out to be capricious and thoroughly unwilling to accept criticism once he became emperor, and after he provoked the Eastern Jin dynasty, the Eastern Jin general Liu Yu captured and killed him in 410, ending the Southern Yan. The Book of Jin described Murong Chao as a handsome man about 1.96 metres tall.

== Early life ==
Murong Chao's father Murong Na (慕容納) was the Prince of Beihai during Former Yan, being a son of Murong Huang (Prince Wenming) and a younger brother of Murong Jun (Emperor Jingzhao). After Former Yan's destruction by Former Qin in 370, the Former Qin emperor Fu Jiān initially made Murong Na a commandery governor, but later Murong Na was relieved from that post and relocated, along with his mother Lady Gongsun and wife Lady Duan to be with his younger brother Murong De, who was the governor of Zhangye Commandery (張掖, roughly modern Zhangye, Gansu). (Murong Na and Murong De had the same mother.) Later, when Murong Na's brothers Murong De and Murong Chui rebelled against Former Qin in 384, with Murong Chui establishing Later Yan and becoming its emperor, Fu Chang (苻昌) the new governor of Zhangye arrested and executed Murong Na and all sons of Murong De and Murong Na. At that time, Lady Duan was not executed because she was pregnant, but she was imprisoned to await execution after she gave birth.

However, the jailer Huyan Ping (呼延平) was a former subordinate of Murong De's, and he took Lady Gongsun and Lady Duan and escaped to the lands of the Qiang tribes, where Lady Duan gave birth to Murong Chao. After Lady Gongsun died in 394, Huyan Ping took Lady Duan and Murong Chao to Later Liang. Later, after Later Liang surrendered to Later Qin in 403, Huyan Ping, Lady Duan, and Murong Chao were among the populace of the Later Liang capital Guzang (姑臧, in modern Wuwei, Gansu) forcibly relocated to the Later Qin capital Chang'an. There, Huyan Ping died, and Lady Duan had Murong Chao take Huyan Ping's daughter as his wife.

Murong Chao was apprehensive that his true identity would be known, and so he became a beggar and pretended to be insane. However, on one occasion, the brother of Later Qin's emperor Yao Xing, Yao Shao (姚紹) the Duke of Dongping, saw him, and thought that this was not truly an insane person—because he looked healthy and strong physically. He informed Yao Xing of this and suggested that Yao Xing give Murong Chao a minor official position to secure him. Yao Xing summoned Murong Chao to an audience with him, but Murong Chao continued the charade and intentionally gave wrong answers or no answers at all when Yao Xing asked him questions. Yao Xing was unconvinced that Yao Shao was correct, and so sent Murong Chao away.

In 405, after Murong De, who had by then established Southern Yan and become its emperor, had become aware that Murong Chao was being detained in Chang'an, he sent secret messengers to encourage him to flee to Southern Yan. Murong Chao did not dare to tell even his mother and wife, and fled to Southern Yan. On the way, he passed through the territory of the general Murong Fa (慕容法), the governor of Yan Province (兗州, modern western Shandong), and Murong Fa, believing that he was not truly of imperial descent, disrespected him, leading him to bear grudges against Murong Fa in the future.

Murong De was greatly pleased when Murong Chao arrived at the capital Guanggu (廣固, in modern Qingzhou, Shandong), and Murong Chao presented him the golden knife that Murong De left Lady Gongsun before leaving. Murong De mourned his mother and brother greatly, but created Murong Chao to be the Prince of Beihai—the same title that Murong Na had. As Murong De had no surviving sons, he considered Murong Chao his probable heir, and he selected talented men to be Murong Chao's assistants. Murong Chao, at this time, was described to be a careful server to his uncle and appropriate in all his outward actions, leading the officials and the populace all to be happy with him.

In fall 405, Murong De fell ill, and considered creating Murong Chao crown prince. During the discussion, an earthquake happened, and taking the earthquake as a bad omen, Murong De temporarily terminated the discussion, but his illness grew worse during the night, and he could no longer speak. His wife Empress Duan Jifei asked him whether Murong Chao should be summoned and created crown prince, and Murong De nodded, and so Murong Chao was created crown prince. Murong De died that night, and the next day, Murong Chao took the throne as the emperor. He honored Empress Duan as empress dowager.

== Reign ==
Murong Chao, however, immediately showed himself to be capricious and unwilling to listen to criticism. He immediately made one of his associates, Gongsun Wulou (公孫五樓), a major general, despite Gongsun's commonly perceived lack of qualifications, and he disassociated himself from the officials Murong Zhong (慕容鍾) the Prince of Beidi and Duan Hong (段宏), whom Murong De had entrusted with great responsibilities. He was further described as being surrounded by flatterers and engaging his time on hunting and tours, refusing all advice against doing so. He further wished to restore punishments that included facial tattooing, cutting off noses, cutting off feet, and castration, but with popular opposition, he did not carry out those actions. He was also described as imposing heavy tax and labor burdens on the people.

In 406, Gongsun, in order to grab even more power, falsely accused Murong Zhong of treason. Murong Zhong, Murong Fa, and Duan Hong therefore entered into a conspiracy in which Feng Song (封嵩) and Empress Dowager Duan were also involved in, but Empress Dowager Duan, in fear, eventually revealed the plot to Murong Chao. Feng was executed, and Murong Chao sent generals Murong Zhen (慕容鎮) the Prince of Guilin and Han Fan (韓範) to attack Murong Zhong, Murong Fa, and Duan Hong. Duan Hong fled to Northern Wei, while Murong Zhong and Murong Fa fled to Later Qin.

In 407, Murong Chao sent his official Feng Kai (封愷) to Later Qin to negotiate to have Yao Xing turn his mother and wife over to him. Yao Xing demanded that he submit as a vassal and further give Later Qin either the court musicians of Former Qin (who had, after much travels, settled down in Southern Yan by this point) or 1,000 captives from Jin. Murong Chao readily agreed to be a vassal, but hesitated at both alternative demands. Eventually, in fear of retaliation from Jin, he chose to turn over 120 musicians. Yao Xing then delivered his mother Lady Duan and wife Lady Huyan to him. In 408, he honored Lady Duan as empress dowager and created Lady Huyan empress.

On lunar new year 409, Murong Chao held the traditional imperial gathering, and he lamented the lack of imperial musicians, and he proposed an attack on Jin to capture people to be trained as musicians, despite the opposition from Han Zhuo (Han Fan's brother, name not in Unicode). A month later, Murong Chao sent the generals Murong Xingzong (慕容興宗), Hugu Ti (斛穀提), and Gongsun Gui (公孫歸, Gongsun Wulou's brother) to attack Jin, capturing Suyu (宿豫, in modern Suqian, Jiangsu) and 2,500 men and women, who were given to the music director to be taught music. Encouraged by the success, Murong Chao carried more raids against Jin.

A month later, the Jin general Liu Yu, then the leader of the Jin government, proposed that a major attack be launched against Southern Yan, and even though he faced opposition, he started the campaign regardless. Gongsun Wulou and Murong Zhen proposed that Southern Yan armies defend Daxian Mountain (大峴山, in modern Weifang, Shandong) and not allow Jin forces to pass. Murong Chao, overly confident, instead decided to let Jin forces pass Daxian, and then engage them in the plains north of Daxian. He further rejected suggestions that the crops be burned to prevent them from being used as food supply by Jin forces. When Murong Zhen commented to Han Zhuo that this would lead to the empire's destruction, Murong Chao threw Murong Zhen into prison.

Liu Yu was very pleased that Murong Chao did not defend Daxian, as he feared. The Jin and Southern Yan forces engaged near Linqu (臨朐, also in Weifang), while Murong Chao himself waited in the city of Linqu. Jin general Hu Fan (胡藩) made a surprise attack on Linqu, capturing it and forcing Murong Chao to flee. With Murong Chao having fled, Liu Yu engaged the main Southern Yan forces and defeated them, and Murong Chao fled back to Guanggu. Liu Yu followed and quickly captured the outer part of the city, putting the inner city under siege. Murong Chao released Murong Zhen and requested his assistance in defending the city, but when Murong Zhen suggested that he pitch one final battle rather than just defending Guanggu, he balked, and he instead sent Han Fan to Later Qin to request emergency assistance. Initially, Yao Xing was willing to provide assistance with an army commanded by the general Yao Qiang (姚強), but after he himself suffered a defeat at the hand of the rebel general Liu Bobo (the emperor of Xia), he withdrew Yao Qiang's troops. Han Fan surrendered to Liu Yu, and the Guanggu garrison became even more desperate. A number of officials suggested to Murong Chao that he surrender to Jin, but he refused and executed anyone who would suggest the such.

In spring 410, Guanggu fell, and Murong Chao was captured. Liu Yu rebuked him for refusing to surrender, but he did not answer Liu Yu at all but only entrusted his mother to the Jin general Liu Jingxuan (劉敬宣), who had previously been a subject of his uncle Murong De. Murong Chao was delivered to the Jin capital Jiankang and executed, and some 3,000 Southern Yan officials and nobles were executed as well.

== Personal information ==
- Father
  - Murong Na (慕容納), Prince of Beihai during Former Yan, son of Murong Huang (Prince Wenming of Former Yan) and brother to Murong Jun (Emperor Jingzhao of Former Yan), Murong Chui (Emperor Wucheng of Later Yan), and Murong De (Emperor Xianwu), posthumously honored as Emperor Mu
- Mother
  - Princess Duan
- Wife
  - Empress Huyan (created 408)
- Major Concubines
  - Consort Wei

Emperor Xianwu of (Southern) Yan House of Murong Born: 385 Died: 410
Regnal titles
Preceded by Murong De	Emperor of Southern Yan; 405–410	Extinct
Titles in pretence
Preceded by Murong De	— TITULAR — Emperor of China; 405–410; Reason for succession failure: Annexed by Eastern Jin	Succeeded by Emperor An of Jin
