= Empress Huyan (Southern Yan) =

Chinese empress

Empress Huyan (呼延皇后, personal name unknown) was an empress of the Xianbei-led Southern Yan dynasty of China. Her husband was the last emperor, Murong Chao.

Her father Huyan Ping (呼延平) was a subordinate of Murong Chao's uncle Murong De when Murong De was the governor of Zhangye Commandery (張掖, roughly modern Zhangye, Gansu) during Former Qin. Later, when Murong De and his brother Murong Chui rebelled against Former Qin in 384, with Murong Chui establishing Later Yan and becoming its emperor, Fu Chang (苻昌) the new governor of Zhangye arrested and executed Murong Chao's father Murong Na (慕容納) and all sons of Murong De and Murong Na. At that time, Murong Na's wife Lady Duan was not executed because she was pregnant, but she was imprisoned to await execution after she gave birth.

However, Huyan Ping was then the jailer, and took Murong Na and Murong De's mother Lady Gongsun and Lady Duan and escaped to the lands of the Qiang tribes, where Lady Duan gave birth to Murong Chao. After Lady Gongsun died in 394, Huyan Ping took Lady Duan and Murong Chao to Later Liang. Later, after Later Liang surrendered to Later Qin in 403, Huyan Ping, Lady Duan, and Murong Chao were among the populace of the Later Liang capital Guzang (姑臧, in modern Wuwei, Gansu) forcibly relocated to the Later Qin capital Chang'an. There, Huyan Ping died, and Lady Duan had Murong Chao take Huyan Ping's daughter as his wife.

In 405, after Murong De, who had by then established Southern Yan and become its emperor, had become aware that Murong Chao was being detained in Chang'an, he sent secret messengers to encourage him to flee to Southern Yan. Murong Chao did not dare to tell even his mother and wife, and fled to Southern Yan. As Murong De had no surviving sons, he made Murong Chao his crown prince, and after he died later that year, Murong Chao succeeded him as emperor.

One thing that Murong Chao immediately opened negotiations with Later Qin on was to request Later Qin to deliver his mother and wife to him. Murong Chao accepted the Later Qin emperor Yao Xing's terms—submit as a vassal, and also to deliver Former Qin imperial musicians who had become Southern Yan court musicians to Later Qin. In 407, Yao Xing delivered Lady Duan and Lady Huyan to Southern Yan. Murong Chao created Lady Huyan empress in 408.

Murong Chao's rule was an arbitrary and incompetent one, and the Southern Yan state suffered greatly, particularly after he provoked Jin by attacking its borders and capturing its people to be trained as replacement musicians in 409. This drew a major attack by the Jin general Liu Yu, and in 410, the Southern Yan capital Guanggu (廣固, in modern Qingzhou, Shandong) fell, and Southern Yan was no more. Murong Chao was executed, and he entrusted his mother and wife to the Jin official Liu Jingxuan (劉敬宣), who had once been a Southern Yan subject. However, no further records about the fate of Empress Huyan was recorded, and it was quite possible that she was executed as well, as Liu Yu executed large numbers of Southern Yan officials and nobles.

Chinese royalty
| Preceded by Empress Duan Jifei | Empress of Southern Yan; 408–410 | Dynasty ended |
| Preceded by Empress Duan Jifei | Empress of China (Shandong); 408–410 | Succeeded by Empress Wang Shen'ai of Jin |
