= Wang Shen'ai =

Wang Shen'ai 王神愛

Empress consort of the Eastern Jin dynasty
- Tenure: 3 May 397 – 3 October 412
- Predecessor: Wang Fahui
- Successor: Chu Lingyuan
- Born: 384
- Died: 3 October 412 (aged 27–28); Jiankang, Eastern Jin
- Spouse: Emperor An of Jin
Posthumous name
- Empress Anxi (安僖皇后)
- Father: Wang Xianzhi
- Mother: Princess Xin'an (新安公主)

Wang Shen'ai (simplified Chinese: 王神爱; traditional Chinese: 王神愛; pinyin: Wáng Shén'ài; b. 384; d. 3 October 412), posthumous name Empress Anxi (Chinese: 安僖皇后; pinyin: Ānxī Huánghòu; lit. 'the peaceful and careful empress') was an empress consort of the Chinese Eastern Jin dynasty. Her husband was the developmentally disabled Emperor An.

== Life ==
Wang Shen'ai was the daughter of the official Wang Xianzhi, the son of the famed official and calligrapher Wang Xizhi. Her mother Princess Xin'an was the daughter of Emperor Jianwen, making her and her husband cousins. In 396, while Emperor An was still crown prince under his father Emperor Xiaowu, they married, and she became crown princess. She was 12, and he was 14. As he was described to be so developmentally disabled that he could not speak or dress himself, or express whether he was full or hungry, it was unlikely that their marriage was consummated; in any case, they had no children. Later that year, after Emperor Xiaowu was killed by his concubine Honoured Lady Zhang for humiliating her, Emperor An became emperor. On 3 May 397, she was created empress.

Very little is known about Empress Wang's life as empress. In 403, after Emperor An's throne was usurped by the warlord Huan Xuan, she was effectively put under house arrest with her husband. In 404, after Liu Yu started a rebellion to reestablish Jin, Huan Xuan had her and her husband transported west with him after he resolved to flee west from the capital Jiankang, but on the way, Huan Xuan's brother-in-law Yin Zhongwen (殷仲文) rebelled against him and transported her and Emperor Mu's empress He Fani back to Jiankang. Later that year, after Huan Xuan was killed and Emperor An was seized back from Huan Xuan's nephew Huan Zhen (桓振), he was reunited with her. She died in October 412 and was buried with honors due an empress on 26 October at Xiuping Mausoleum; Emperor An was also buried there after his death in January 419.

Chinese royalty
Preceded by Empress Gou of Former Qin	Empress of China (Shandong); 396–399	Succeeded by Empress Duan Jifei of Southern Yan
Preceded by Empress Gou of Former Qin	Empress of China (Henan); 396–399	Succeeded by Empress Zhang of Later Qin
Preceded by Empress Gou of Former Qin	Empress of China (Southwestern); 396–403	Succeeded by Empress Liu of Chu
Preceded by Empress Wang Fahui	Empress of China (Southern); 396–403	Succeeded by Empress Liu of Chu
Preceded by Empress Wang Fahui	Empress of Jin Dynasty (266–420); 396–403	Vacant Dynasty interrupted
Preceded by Empress Liu of Chu	Empress of China (Southwestern); 404–405	Succeeded by Empress Chu
Preceded by Empress Liu of Chu	Empress of China (Southeastern); 404–412	Succeeded by Empress Chu
Vacant Dynasty interrupted	Empress of Jin Dynasty (266–420); 404–412	Succeeded by Empress Chu
Preceded by Empress Huyan of Southern Yan	Empress of China (Shandong); 410–412	Succeeded by Empress Chu
