= Fu Xunying =

Chinese empress

Fu Xunying (苻訓英) (died 407 AD) was an empress of the Xianbei-led Chinese Later Yan dynasty. Her husband was Murong Xi (Emperor Zhaowen).

== Life ==
Fu Xunying was a daughter of Fu Mo (苻謨), a member of Former Qin's imperial house before he surrendered to Later Yan under military pressure. As of 397, he was the mayor of Later Yan's capital Zhongshan (中山, in modern Baoding, Hebei) when the Later Yan emperor Murong Bao (Emperor Huimin) abandoned Zhongshan in face of Northern Wei military attacks, and he was subsequently killed by Murong Bao's nephew Murong Xiang (慕容詳) the Duke of Kaifeng, who wanted to be emperor himself. His family was slaughtered.

Somehow, however, Fu Xunying and her older sister Fu Song'e were not killed—perhaps they escaped the slaughter, or perhaps they were no longer in Zhongshan at that point. After Murong Xi became emperor in 401 after succeeding his nephew Murong Sheng (Emperor Zhaowu), he took Fu Song'e and Fu Xunying as imperial consorts in 402 and greatly favored them. This caused him to neglect Murong Sheng's mother Empress Dowager Ding, with whom he had an affair and whose support was instrumental in his becoming emperor. Empress Dowager Ding, in anger, plotted to overthrow him and replace him with Murong Bao's son Murong Yuan (慕容淵), but her plot was discovered, and she was forced to commit suicide.

=== Empress ===
Around the new year 404, Murong Xi made Fu Xunying empress. It was said he was so inclined to grant every wish that she and her sister Song'e had, and providing them with every luxury, that his small empire's resources were highly drained. In fall 404, Song'e grew ill, and after she died despite a doctor's promise that he could cure her, Murong Xi had the doctor executed by drawing and quartering and then burned his body. After Song'e's death, he grew even more doting of Fu, who favored hunting and traveling. In winter of 404, they went on a long hunt and tour that took them as north as Bailu Mountain (白鹿山, in modern Tongliao, Inner Mongolia), as east as Qingling (青嶺, described as about 100 kilometers east of the capital Longcheng (龍城, in modern Jinzhou, Liaoning)), and as south as Haiyang (海陽, in modern Qinhuangdao, Hebei) before returning to Longcheng. On this winter journey, it was described that more than 5,000 escorting soldiers died from attacks by tigers or wolves or exposure to the cold. In other known events, she was said to have demanded to have jellied fish in the summer and fresh Rehmannia roots in the winter—neither of which were obtainable—and Murong Xi executed officials in charge of supplying the palace for their failures.

In spring 405, Murong Xi, with Fu with him, attacked Goguryeo's major city Liaodong (遼東, in modern Liaoyang, Liaoning), and had almost captured it. However, he ordered his soldiers to flatten the wall so that he could enter with Fu on an imperial wagon. The delay allowed the Goguryeo forces to refortify the city, and he was unable to capture it.

Around the new year 406, Murong Xi, with Fu with him, was making a surprise attack on Khitan tribes when he decided that the Khitan were too strong to be attacked and wanted to withdraw. However, at Fu's insistence that she wanted to observe a battle, he abandoned his heavy guard and took his faster cavalry to attack Goguryeo. The attack was unsuccessful, and he was forced to withdraw.

=== Death ===
In 407, Murong Xi built a new palace for Empress Fu, Chenghua Palace (承華殿), using so much dirt in the project that dirt was described to become as expensive as grain. In summer 407, Empress Fu died. Murong Xi mourned her so much that he had intercourse with her corpse. He ordered that a magnificent tomb be built for her, and also forced his sister-in-law, Princess Zhang of Gaoyang (Murong Long's wife) to commit suicide so that she could be buried with Empress Fu. The officials were all forced to weep for Empress Fu, with those who could not shed tears punished severely, so they put spicy food in their mouths to stimulate tear production. Eventually, Murong Xi accompanied Empress Fu's funeral procession out of Longcheng, and after he left, the soldiers in the city mutinied under the command of the general Feng Ba, and they made Murong Bao's adoptive son Murong Yun emperor (as Emperor Huiyi). Murong Xi was defeated, captured, and executed. Murong Yun (who then changed his name back to the original Gao Yun), however, buried Murong Xi and Empress Fu together with imperial honors.

Chinese royalty
Preceded by Empress Duan	Empress of Later Yan; 404–407	Succeeded by Empress Li
Preceded by Empress Duan	Empress of China (Liaoning); 404–407	Succeeded by Empress Li
