= Jianguang =

Jianguang may refer to:

- Jianguang Subdistrict (剑光街道), a subdistrict in Fengcheng, Jiangxi, China

== Historical eras ==
- Jianguang (建光, 121–122), era name used by Emperor An of Han
- Jianguang (建光, 388–391), era name used by Zhai Liao
