= Conquest of Southern Yan by Jin =

409 AD battle in China

- Part of Liu Yu's Northern Expeditions
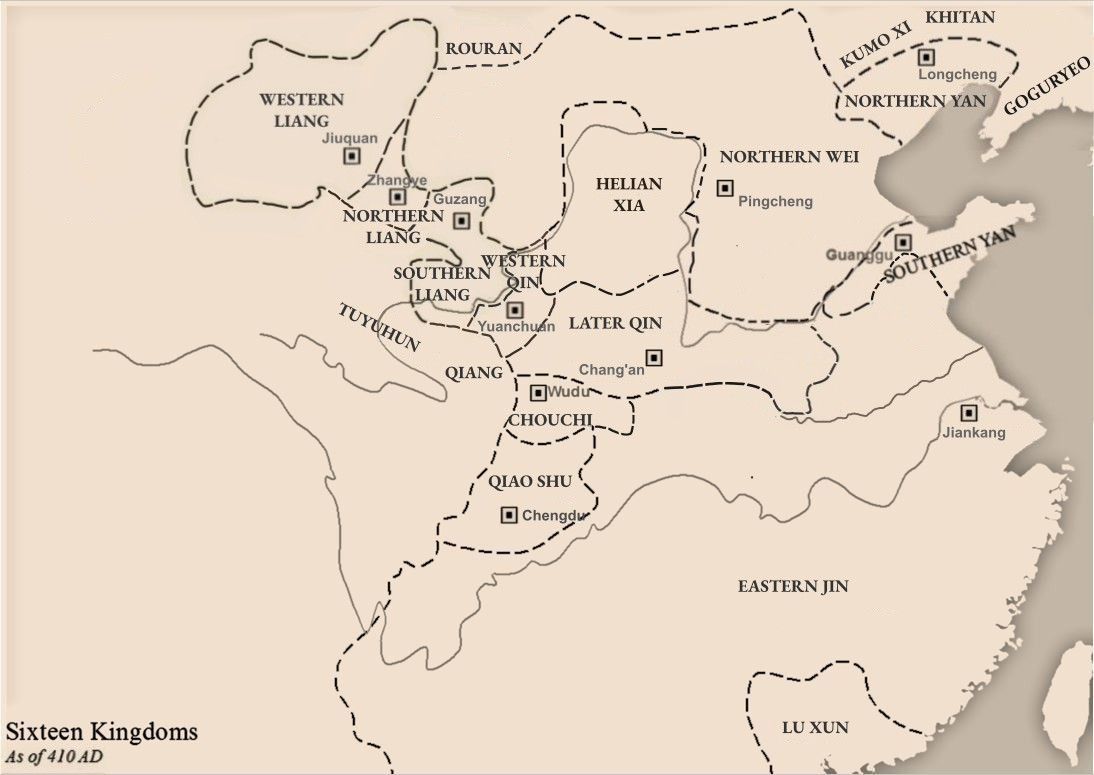
- Map of China in 410, showing Southern Yan and Eastern Jin
Date	11 May 409 – 25 March 410
Location	Shandong, China
Result	Eastern Jin victory

Belligerents
Eastern Jin	Southern Yan

Commanders and leaders
Liu Yu	Murong Chao

Strength
Unknown	Unknown

Casualties and losses
Unknown	Unknown, heavy

The Conquest of Southern Yan by Jin, also known as Liu Yu's Conquest of Southern Yan, was a military campaign launched by the Jin dynasty (266–420) against the Southern Yan dynasty during the Sixteen Kingdoms period of Chinese history. It was the first of two northern expeditions launched by the Jin general, Liu Yu, and resulted in the fall of Southern Yan.

== Prelude ==
Conflict between the Southern Yan and Eastern Jin began in 399 when Murong De, leader of the Southern Yan, attacked and conquered the Eastern Jin Qing Province (which corresponds to modern central and eastern Shandong), following the conquest of Southern Yan’s previous territory by the Northern Wei. At the time, the Jin were struggling with internal problems and rebellions and so didn’t take any military action against Southern Yan. Following Murong De’s death, he was succeeded by Murong Chao, who was forced to become a vassal to the Later Qin in return for his wife and mother, who were stranded in Later Qin. Another clause in this agreement was that Murong Chao was forced to give his court musicians to Later Qin and so, in 409, Murong Chao decided to raid Jin territory and capture people to be trained as new musicians. This raid was very successful and so Murong Chao would later launch numerous further raids into Jin territory as well. However, Jin was in a better state than it had been in 399 and the Jin regent Liu Yu decided to launch an invasion of Southern Yan. Upon hearing of the planned invasion, the main Southern Yan generals proposed that their army defend Daxian Mountain (next to modern Weifang). However, Murong Chao rejected this idea, wanting to engage his enemy in the plains as he had the superior cavalry. Liu Yu entered Shandong and met the Southern Yan army outside the city of Linqu.

== Campaign ==
=== Battle of Linqu ===
Liu Yu knew that the main advantage Southern Yan had was their much superior cavalry and so to counter this, he formed his chariots into two walls on either side of his army and stationed some of his men to defend them. When the Southern Yan cavalry charged, they were unable to break through the chariots. Meanwhile, the infantry of both sides were equal and the battle developed into a stalemate. Liu Yu decided to send some of his men on a large flanking manoeuvre which appeared on another side of Linqu’s walls and attempted to enter the city. The Southern Yan, however, believed that this was a whole new army and began to panic and soon, the army broke and fled, ending the battle.

=== Siege of Guanggu ===
Liu Yu would go on to besiege Guanggu, the capital of Southern Yan. The siege lasted around 8 months as Murong Chao held strongly to Guanggu's firm defences, frustrating Liu Yu in the process. During the siege, Liu Yu managed to capture one of Southern Yan's minister, Zhang Gang (張綱), who was returning from an envoy mission in Later Qin. Zhang Gang was a skilled engineer, and he agreed to help Liu Yu capture Guanggu by building many siege engines such as "flying towers" (飛樓), "hanging ladders" (懸梯) and "wooden screens" (木幔). After many months of siege, nearly all of Guanggu's inhabitants had either surrendered or were incapacitated from disease or hunger. In March 410, Jin forces finally broke through the city after a Yan defector, Yue Shou (悅壽), opened the city gates. Murong Chao was captured and executed and the Jin reoccupied Qing province, ending the Southern Yan.

== Aftermath ==
Liu Yu's success against the Southern Yan increased his prestige and reputation. He would launch another successful northern expedition in 416, this time against the Later Qin. His victories in the north would help contribute to his establishment of the Liu Song dynasty in 420.
