= Empress Huyan =

Empress Huyan (呼延皇后) may refer to one of several empresses of the Sixteen Kingdoms of Chinese history:

- Empress Huyan (Liu Yuan's wife), wife of Han Zhao's founding emperor Liu Yuan
- Empress Huyan (Liu Cong's wife), wife of Liu Yuan's son Liu Cong
- Empress Huyan (Southern Yan), wife of Southern Yan's emperor Murong Chao
