= Murong Sheng =

Emperor Zhaowu of Later Yan 後燕昭武帝

Ruler of Later Yan
- Reign: August 19, 398 – September 13, 401
- Predecessor: Lan Han (usurper)
- Successor: Murong Xi
- Born: 373
- Died: September 13, 401 (aged 27–28)
- Burial: Xingping Mausoleum (興平陵)
Full name
- Family name: Mùróng (慕容); Given name: Shèng (盛)
Era dates
- Jiànpíng (建平): 398; Chánglè (長樂): 399–401
Regnal name
- Emperor (398–400); Commoner Heavenly King (庶人天王, 400–401)
Posthumous name
- Emperor Zhāowǔ (昭武皇帝, "accomplished and martial") (full)
Temple name
- Zhōngzōng (中宗)
- House: Murong
- Dynasty: Later Yan

Murong Sheng (Chinese: 慕容盛; 373–13 September 401), courtesy name Daoyun (Chinese: 道運), also known by his posthumous name as the Emperor Zhaowu of Later Yan (Chinese: 後燕昭武帝), was an emperor of the Xianbei-led Later Yan dynasty of China. He was the oldest son of Murong Bao (Emperor Huimin), and after Murong Bao was killed by Lan Han (Murong Sheng's father-in-law) avenged his father in a coup and took the throne. During his final years, he demoted himself from Emperor and used the unique title of "Heavenly King of the common people" (Chinese: 庶人天王).

Murong Sheng was described as a talented strategist and general, but he overreacted to what he perceived to be his father's weaknesses—being overly lenient and weak—and was harsh in his reign, causing his officials to be constantly insecure and looking to rebel against him. In one of those rebellions in 401, he was stricken by a rebel soldier and died from his injuries. He was succeeded by his uncle Murong Xi (Emperor Zhaowen). In the Record of Jin, Murong Sheng was described as a strong and courageous man who excelled in archery skills.

== Under Former Qin and Western Yan rule ==
Murong Sheng was born in 373, to Murong Bao and his concubine Lady Ding, and was likely born in or near the Former Qin capital Chang'an, since Murong Bao was then a low-level official there. The first historical reference to him was around the new year 385, when the Former Qin emperor Fu Jiān, in response to an attempted rebellion by the former Former Yan emperor Murong Wei, ordered all Xianbei in Chang'an executed. (Murong Sheng's grandfather Murong Chui (Emperor Wucheng) had already rebelled late 383 and established Later Yan in 384.) Murong Sheng's uncle Murong Rou (慕容柔) was not executed, since he had been previously adopted by the eunuch Song Ya (宋牙), and Murong Rou presumably put Murong Sheng and his brother Murong Hui under his protection, for soon thereafter Murong Rou, Murong Sheng, and Murong Hui fled out of Chang'an and sought refuge with another former Forman Yan prince, Murong Chong, a cousin of Murong Sheng's, who had also led a rebellion against Former Qin near Chang'an.

In spring 385, upon hearing news that Murong Wei had been killed, Murong Chong declared himself emperor (with his state later known as Western Yan). Murong Sheng was, however, not impressed with Murong Chong, and he secretly told Murong Rou that he believed that Murong Chong will amount to nothing. His judgment was correct, for although Murong Chong captured Chang'an in summer 385, he did not govern his people well, and his Xianbei people became resentful that he stayed in Chang'an (both because he liked the city and because he feared Murong Chui) rather than seeking to head back east to their homeland. In spring 386, the general Han Yan (韓延) assassinated Murong Chong. Western Yan forces than abandoned Chang'an and headed east, toward home—a journey during which they went through a succession of five more leaders (Duan Sui, Murong Yi, Murong Yao, Murong Zhong, and Murong Yong) within a span of a few months, with the regime stabilizing under Murong Yong, who settled down at the capital of Zhangzi (長子, in modern Changzhi, Shanxi). Murong Sheng, along with his uncle Murong Rou and brother Murong Hui, settled in as well.

Several months later, however, in winter 386, Murong Sheng warned Murong Rou and Murong Hui that, because of their status as Murong Chui's family, they were being suspected by Murong Yong (a distant cousin). At his urging, the three of them fled back to Later Yan. (His observations turned out to be astute, as a year later, Murong Yong had all descendants of Murong Chui and the Former Yan emperor Murong Jun (Murong Chui's older brother) remaining in his state slaughtered.) It took several months for them to reach the Later Yan capital Zhongshan (中山, in modern Baoding, Hebei). Murong Chui was very pleased at their arrival and declared a general pardon to celebrate. When Murong Chui asked Murong Sheng how things were in Zhangzi, Murong Sheng, at age 14, told him that Western Yan was in a state of disturbance and that Murong Chui, as long as he was able to rule his state will, that when he got ready to attack Western Yan, Murong Yong's soldiers would desert him. Murong Chui created him the Duke of Changle.

== During Murong Chui's reign ==
In 389, at the age of 16, Murong Sheng was put in charge by Murong Chui of the old Former Yan capital Jicheng (modern Beijing). In 391, he was given the title of viceroy. He remained there until around the new year 396, when, in light of his father Murong Bao's defeat by Northern Wei's prince Tuoba Gui at the Battle of Canhe Slope, Murong Chui recalled Murong Sheng and his uncle Murong Long (the viceroy at another old Former Yan capital, Longcheng (龍城, in modern Jinzhou, Liaoning) back to Zhongshan with their troops, to prepare for another attack on Northern Wei. In spring 396, Murong Chui's campaign against Northern Wei was initially successful, but he then got ill and was forced to withdraw back to Zhongshan, and he died on the way. Murong Bao succeeded him.

== During Murong Bao's reign ==
Murong Bao then faced a succession issue. Murong Hui, now the Duke of Qinghe, was most favored by Murong Chui and considered the most capable, and when Murong Chui waged his last campaign, he put Murong Hui in charge of Longcheng. As Murong Chui was on his deathbed, he further told Murong Bao to make Murong Hui his crown prince, but Murong Bao favored his young son Murong Ce (慕容策) the Duke of Puyang, and did not favor Murong Hui. Murong Sheng, who was slightly older than Murong Hui, also did not want Murong Hui to be crown prince, and so also encouraged Murong Bao to create Murong Ce crown prince. Murong Bao did so in fall 396, and created Murong Hui and Murong Sheng princes (in Murong Sheng's case, the Prince of Changle). Murong Hui was displeased and secretly considered rebellion.

Later in 396, Northern Wei launched a major attack on Later Yan, quickly taking Bing Province (并州, modern central and northern Shanxi) and then descending on Zhongshan, putting it under siege. In spring 397, after being unable to force Northern Wei to lift its siege and after Murong Bao's brother Murong Lin the Prince of Zhao rebelled, Murong Bao decided to abandon Zhongshan and flee to Longcheng. Murong Sheng followed his father in joining his brother Murong Hui's army, which had advanced south from Longcheng. Later that year, after Murong Hui killed Murong Long and severely wounded another uncle, Murong Nong, in an attempted coup to force Murong Bao to create him crown prince, Murong Hui was defeated and killed. Meanwhile, Murong Sheng became one of the major generals.

In 398, against Murong Sheng's and Murong Nong's advice, Murong Bao insisted on launching another campaign to try to regain territory lost to Northern Wei, putting Murong Sheng in charge of Longcheng as he departed. The tired troops mutinied on the way, forcing him to return to Longcheng to defend it with Murong Sheng, but when Murong Nong then inexplicably surrendered to the rebels, Longcheng fell, and Murong Bao and Murong Sheng were forced to flee to Jicheng. Murong Sheng's father-in-law Lan Han then took control of Longcheng and offered to welcome Murong Bao back. Murong Sheng, not trusting his father-in-law, advised his father to secretly advance south to try to join forces with his granduncle Murong De, who had been still defending Yecheng, not realizing that by that point Murong De had abandoned Yecheng and regrouped at Huatai (滑台, in modern Anyang, Henan) and declared his own independent state of Southern Yan. As Murong Bao and Murong Sheng arrived in vicinity of Huatai, however, they realized this and fled back north again. On the way, Murong Sheng tried to garner support from the people now under Northern Wei rule to coalesce around Murong Bao to start a new resistance, but Murong Bao, now believing in Lan Han's loyalty, was resolved to return to Longcheng despite Murong Sheng's misgivings. Murong Sheng, after being unable to change his father's mind, left his father and hid himself.

His worries about Lan Han turned out to be correct, for as Murong Bao arrived in Longcheng's vicinity, Lan Han had his brother Lan Jia'nan (蘭加難) intercept Murong Bao and kill him. Lan Han then killed Murong Sheng's brother Murong Ce, along with most members of the Murong imperial house, and declared himself the Prince of Changli, apparently having successfully taken over the remaining territories of Later Yan.

== Coup against Lan Han ==
Upon hearing his father's death and Lan Han's coup, Murong Sheng resolved to immediately head to Longcheng to mourn his father, believing that Lan Han would have pity on him, after having killed his father, and would spare him based on his having married Lan Han's daughter. His judgment was correct, and with his wife Princess Lan's, and her mother Lady Yi's intercession, Murong Sheng was spared, despite repeated requests by Lan Han's brothers Lan Ti (蘭堤) and Lan Jia'nan to have Murong Sheng killed.

Lan Han also spared Murong Qi (慕容奇) the Prince of Taiyuan, whose mother was also a daughter of Lan Han. Murong Sheng and Murong Qi then conspired for Murong Qi to flee out of the city and start an uprising. Murong Sheng, meanwhile, suggested to Lan Han that Lan Ti, not himself, was behind Murong Qi's rebellion. Further, at this time, because of a severe drought, Lan Han went to pray to the Later Yan ancestral temples and Murong Bao's spirit, blaming Murong Bao's murder on Lan Jia'nan. Upon hearing these things, Lan Ti and Lan Jia'nan became angry and started a rebellion of their own. Lan Han's crown prince Lan Mu, meanwhile, suggested that Murong Sheng be killed, and Lan Han initially agreed, but Murong Sheng, upon hearing the news through Princess Lan, declined to attend an imperial meeting that Lan Han called, and Lan Han soon changed his mind.

Soon thereafter, after Lan Mu had won a victory over Lan Ti and Lan Jia'nan, Lan Han held a feast for the soldiers, at which both he and Lan Mu became extremely drunk. Murong Sheng used this opportunity to join some army officers whom he had persuaded to join his cause, and they killed Lan Han and Lan Mu, and then Lan Ti, Lan Jia'nan, and Lan Han's other sons Lan He (蘭和) the Duke of Lu and Lan Yang (蘭揚) the Duke of Chen. Murong Sheng then declared Later Yan's restoration and took the throne, but in order to show humility, did so with his present title of Prince of Changle, rather than claiming imperial title immediately.

== Reign ==
Initially, the people were glad that Murong Sheng was victorious, believing that he would be a capable ruler. That Murong Sheng's reign would be a harsh one, however, was immediately hinted at as he considered executing his wife Princess Lan as being of the traitor Lan Han's family. His mother Consort Ding opposed—citing the fact that Princess Lan had protected both Murong Sheng and her—and Princess Lan was spared, but was never able to become empress. (However, Murong Sheng would also never create another person as empress during his reign.) In winter 398, he formally accepted imperial title, and he honored his father's wife Empress Duan as the empress dowager, while honoring his mother with the title Empress Xianzhuang (獻莊皇后).

Murong Sheng's reign, indeed, was one in which he showed strong personal abilities, and yet at the same time alienated the officials and the people with his harshness. As a result, many officials were executed based on actual or suspected treasonous plots. These included:

- Fall 398: the general Ma Le (馬勒) and Murong Sheng's cousins Murong Chong (慕容崇, note different character than the Western Yan emperor) the Duke of Gaoyang and Murong Cheng (慕容澄) the Duke of Dongping (sons of Murong Long)
- Winter 398: the general Murong Hao (慕容豪) (probably a cousin) and the officials Zhang Tong (張通) and Zhang Shun (張順)
- Spring 399: the officials Liu Zhong (留忠), Liu Zhi (留志), Duan Cheng (段成), and Murong Gen (慕容根) the Duke of Dongyang
- Spring 399 as well: the generals Zhang Zhen (張真) and He Han (和翰)
- Fall 399: the general Li Lang (李朗)
- Winter 399: the general Wei Shuang (衛雙)

However, Murong Sheng was also praised by historians for his attention to ordinary criminal cases, and that he was able to institute a system where he personally heard criminal appeals and was able to discern the truth without resorting to torture (a common interrogation device in Chinese history). Through the next few years, there would be battles with Northern Wei, with neither side being able to decisively gain an advantage.

Around new year 400, Murong Sheng created his son Murong Ding (慕容定) the Duke of Liaoxi. Soon thereafter, Empress Dowager Duan died, and he honored his mother as empress dowager instead and, at the same time, created Murong Ding crown prince. He also soon, to show humility, stopped using the title emperor, instead referring to himself as "Commoner Heavenly King."

In fall 401, the generals Murong Guo (慕容國), Qin Yu (秦輿), and Duan Zan (段讚) secretly plotted a coup, but their plot was revealed, and more than 500 people were executed. Five days later, the general Duan Ji (段璣), along with Qin Yu's son Qin Xing (秦興) and Duan Zan's son Duan Tai (段泰) attacked the palace. Murong Sheng personally led the palace guards to fight with the rebels and was initially successful. However, just as things appeared to be settling down, a rebel soldier appeared from his hiding place and stabbed Murong Sheng. Murong Sheng, despite the injury, ordered the guards to clear the palace and go on the correct alert posts, before dying. After his death, his mother Empress Dowager Ding, who had carried on an affair with his uncle Murong Xi, would bypass Crown Prince Ding and make Murong Xi emperor to succeed him.

== Personal information ==
- Father
  - Murong Bao (Emperor Huimin)
- Mother
  - Consort Ding (forced to commit suicide 402), posthumously honored as Empress Xianyou
- Wife
  - Princess Consort Lan, daughter of Lan Han
- Children
  - Murong Ding (慕容定), initially the Duke of Liaoxi (created 400), later the Crown Prince (created 400, forced to commit suicide 401)

Emperor Zhaowu of (Later) Yan House of Murong Born: 373 Died: 401
Regnal titles
Preceded by Murong Bao	Emperor of Later Yan; 398–401	Succeeded by Murong Xi
Titles in pretence
Preceded by Murong Bao	— TITULAR — Emperor of China; 398–401; Reason for succession failure: Sixteen Kingdoms	Succeeded by Murong Xi
