= Empress Min =

Empress Min may refer to the following empresses:

- Fu Song'e (died 404), consort of Murong Xi (Emperor Zhaowen of Later Yan), posthumously known as Empress Min
- Empress Xiao (Sui dynasty) (566–648), wife of Emperor Yang of Sui, posthumously known as Empress Min
- Empress Myeongseong (1851–1895), wife of Gojong of Korea before he became an emperor, surnamed Min
- Empress Sunmyeong (1872–1907), wife of Sunjong of Korea before his enthronement, surnamed Min
