= Empress Liu (Huan Xuan's wife) =

Wife of warlord Huan Xuan, c. 404

Empress Liu (Chinese: 劉皇后; personal name unknown; fl.395 - 404) was an empress consort of China's short-lived Huan Chu (桓楚) dynasty. Her husband was Huan Chu's only emperor, Huan Xuan (Emperor Wudao).

She was the great-granddaughter of the Western Jin official Liu Qiao; her grandfather Liu Ting (劉挺), father Liu Dan (劉耽) and brother Liu Liu (刘柳; died 13 July 416?) were also officials. She married Huan Xuan before he became a major warlord, although the exact time is not known. After Huan Xuan seized the throne from Emperor An of Jin in January 404, he created her empress in the first month of the Chinese year 404. She was described as someone with good judgement of character, and she, suspecting the intentions of the general Liu Yu, told Huan Xuan that Liu Yu would not be his subordinate long and should be killed. Huan Xuan refused. Later in 404, however, Liu Yu started an uprising that eventually forced Huan Xuan from the capital Jiankang and led to his downfall and death. Empress Liu's fate is unknown.

Chinese royalty
Preceded by Empress Wang Shen'ai	Empress of China (Southern); 404	Succeeded by Empress Wang Shen'ai
