= Zhai Wei =

Wei 魏
- 388–392
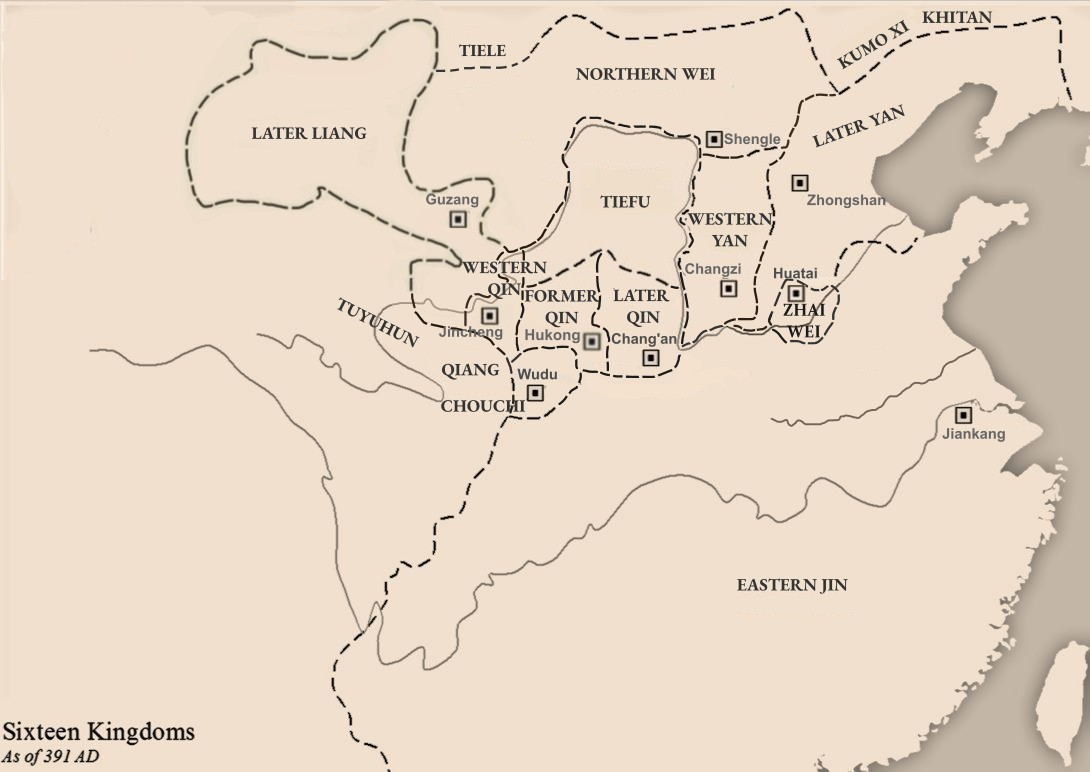
- Zhai Wei in 391 AD
- Status: Kingdom
- Capital: Huatai
- Government: Monarchy
- Tian Wang
  - 388-391: Zhai Liao
  - 391-392: Zhai Zhao
- Historical era: Sixteen Kingdoms
  - Zhai Liao's last break with Later Yan: 387
  - Established: 388
  - Disestablished: 392
  - Zhai Zhao's execution by Western Yan: 393
Succeeded by
Later Yan; Western Yan
- Today part of: China

Wei (Chinese: 魏; pinyin: Wèi), known in historiography as Zhai Wei (Chinese: 翟魏), was a dynastic state of China ruled by the Dingling people that existed from 388 to 392, during the Sixteen Kingdoms period of Chinese history. Its founder Zhai Liao had previously been vacillating between being a vassal of the Later Yan, Western Yan, and Eastern Jin dynasties, and in 388, after his last overture to reconcile with Later Yan's emperor Murong Chui was rejected, he founded his own dynasty, over the territory of modern central and eastern Henan. In 392, Zhai Wei, then under Zhai Liao's son Zhai Zhao, was destroyed by Later Yan forces. Because of its relatively small size and short lifespan, Zhai Wei is not included by historians among the Sixteen Kingdoms.

The rulers of Zhai Wei used the title "Heavenly King" (Tian Wang).

== History ==
=== Background ===
The Zhai clan were Dingling people who once resided in Kangju in the Western Regions for generations before migrating into China. Their first recorded leader was Zhai Shu, who was living with his followers around Zhongshan and Changshan commanderies during the fall of Western Jin. The Zhai later became subjects of the Later Zhao dynasty, with their chieftain, Zhai Bin receiving the title of Prince of Gouting, and later submitted to the Former Yan. In 371, after the Yan was conquered by the Former Qin, Zhai Bin and his people were forcibly relocated to Xin'an and Mianchi in the east, a decision that sparked discontent among the Dingling.

After the Former Qin's disastrous defeat at the Battle of Fei River in 383, Zhai Bin rebelled and attacked Luoyang. Qin sent the Xianbei general, Murong Chui, to campaign against him, but Chui also rebelled and carried out his plans to restore his family's state of Yan. At the advice of his subordinates, Zhai Bin agreed to join forces with Chui, and he was given the title of Prince of Henan after Chui founded the Later Yan in 384.

However, Zhai Bin soon grew discontent with his position and demanded more as Chui was laying siege on Ye. When his demands were rejected, he plotted to defect to Former Qin with the Dingling, but was discovered and executed. His nephew, Zhai Zhen, fled from Ye and began a rebellion, forming a base in Chengying (承營; around present-day Xingtai, Hebei) and allying with Qin.

In 385, after moving to Xingtang, Zhai Zhen was assassinated by his general, Xianyu Qi (鮮于乞). Qi was then killed by his soldiers, who acclaimed Zhai Zhen's cousin, Zhai Cheng as their new leader, but at this point, many of the Dingling soldiers defected to Later Yan. Later that year, when Murong Chui besieged Xingtang, Zhai Cheng's general, Xianyu De (鮮于得) beheaded him and surrendered to Later Yan. Chui massacred Xingtang, but Zhai Cheng's cousin, Zhai Liao escaped to the Eastern Jin in Liyang (黎陽; present-day Xun County, Henan).

In 386, Zhai Liao rebelled and took control of Liyang, and he was joined by the Jin Administrator of Taishan, Zhang Yuan (張願). In Later Yan, rebellions broke out in succession in Wei and Gaoping commanderies, and they all went to join with Zhai Liao. In 387, Murong Chui sent his generals to attack Zhai Liao, forcing him to submit, but he once again rebelled not long after. In 388, he sent an envoy to Murong Chui to apologize for his crimes, but Chui refused to accept it due to his repeated betrayals. Thus, Zhai Liao decided to claim himself the title of Heavenly King of Wei.

=== Reign of Zhai Liao ===
Zhai Liao adopted the Chinese governing system by proclaiming a new reign era and establishing the imperial offices. He moved his capital to Huatai (滑台, in modern Anyang, Henan), intending to use the Yellow River as a defence against Later Yan, though throughout his reign, he more frequently clashed with the Eastern Jin. In 389, he captured Yingyang Commandery (滎陽, roughly modern Zhengzhou, Henan) from Jin and had the Later Yan prince and Inspector of Ji province, Murong Wen assassinated. In 390, he attempted to capture Luoyang from Jin, but was repelled. Jin forces led by Liu Laozhi later captured Taishan and defeated Zhai Liao at Huatai, but they did not destroy the state before withdrawing.

=== Reign of Zhai Zhao ===
Zhai Liao died in 391 and was succeeded by his son, Zhai Zhao. Immediately after ascending, he unsuccessfully attacked Ye. In 392, Murong Chui personally led a campaign to conquer Zhai Wei once and for all. Zhai Zhao requested reinforcements from the Western Yan, but they refused to help. Murong Chui and Zhai Zhao's armies fought along the Yellow River at Liyang, where Wei was greatly routed. Zhai Zhao retreated to Huatai before fleeing north of the Yellow River to hold out at Mount Bailu (白鹿山; north of present-day Xiuwu County, Henan), but as he eventually ran out of food, he was forced to come out and was ambushed by the Later Yan army. Zhai Zhao escaped alone to the Western Yan, thus ending his short-lived state.

The ruler of Western Yan, Murong Yong, initially appointed Zhai Zhao as a general and bestowed him the title of Prince of Chen. However, years later, Zhai Zhao attempted to rebel, so Yong had him executed.

== Rulers of Wei ==
Personal name	Reign	Era names
Zhai Liao	388–391	Jianguang (建光) 388–391
Zhai Zhao	391–392	Dingding (定鼎) 391–392

== Family tree ==
Zhai Wei family tree

□
Zhai Bin 翟斌 r. 383–384	Zhai Tan 翟檀 d. 384	Zhai Min 翟敏 d. 384	□	□
Zhai Liao 翟遼; Jianguang Tian Wang 建光天王 r. 386–391	Zhai Zhen 翟真 r. 384–385	Zhai Cheng 翟成 r. 385
Zhai Zhao 翟釗; Dingding Tian Wang 定鼎天王 r. 391–392– d. 393

== See also ==
- Ethnic groups in Chinese history
