= Lan Han =

Lan Han 蘭汗

Emperor of Later Yan
- Reign: May 27, 398 – August 15, 398
- Predecessor: Murong Bao
- Successor: Murong Sheng
- Died: August 15, 398
Full name
- Family name: Lán (蘭); Given name: Hàn (汗)
Era name and dates
- Qīnglóng (青龍): May 27, 398 – August 19, 398
- House: Lan
- Dynasty: Later Yan (by usurpation)

Lan Han (Chinese: 蘭汗; died August 15, 398) was an official and a consort kin of the Xianbei-led Chinese Later Yan dynasty, who killed the emperor Murong Bao (Emperor Huimin) in 398 and briefly usurped the throne before being killed by Murong Bao's son Murong Sheng (Emperor Zhaowu).

Lan Han was an uncle of Murong Bao's father Murong Chui (Emperor Wucheng), the founding emperor of Later Yan, as a younger brother of his mother Consort Lan (although some references indicate that he was her cousin, not her brother), and in 384 he assisted Murong Chui's son Murong Nong in starting a rebellion against the Former Qin dynasty to assist Murong Chui's main rebellion. During Murong Chui's reign he was sparsely mentioned in history. In 387 he was one of the commanders in a Later Yan campaign against the Eastern Jin dynasty. In 391 he commanded a force against a chieftain of the Xianbei Helan (賀蘭) tribe, Helan Rangan (賀蘭染干). During Murong Chui's reign, he married one of his daughters to Murong Sheng, then the Duke of Changle. As of 395 Lan Han was referred to as the Prince of Yangcheng and was defending Jicheng (modern Beijing). (This reference, however, may be in error, as in 396, after Murong Chui had died and been succeeded by Murong Bao, a cousin of Murong Chui's, Murong Lan (慕容蘭), was referred to as the Prince of Yangcheng and defending Jicheng, so it could have been that both references were supposed to be to Lan Han or neither was.)

In spring 398, after a rebellion by the general Duan Sugu (段速骨) had Murong Bao sieged behind the walls of Longcheng (龍城, in modern Jinzhou, Liaoning), Lan Han was described as having the title of Prince of Dunqiu and commanding an army near the city, but secretly aligned with Duan. It was at his instigation that Murong Nong surrendered to Duan, causing the morale of Murong Bao's army to collapse and Longcheng to fall, forcing Murong Bao to flee. Less than a month later, however, Lan ambushed Duan and took over Longcheng and temporarily installed Murong Bao's crown prince Murong Ce (慕容策) as leader while sending messengers to try to welcome Murong Bao back to Longcheng. He also resumed sacrifices to Later Yan ancestral temples to show that he was still faithful to the Later Yan state. Murong Bao, based on Murong Sheng's advice, initially declined Lan's request and tried to head south to join his uncle Murong De, but upon hearing that Murong De had assumed imperial powers himself earlier in the year, returned north again under escort by Lan Han's brother Lan Jia'nan (蘭加難). As the procession neared Longcheng, however, Lan Jia'nan, likely under Lan Han's orders, killed Murong Bao. Lan Han then killed Murong Ce and a number of other Murong princes as well and declared himself Grand Chanyu and the Prince of Changli. He also changed era name to "Qinglong" (青龍), signifying that he was declaring a new state.

Murong Sheng, who had been suspicious of his father-in-law's intentions and therefore did not join his father's procession back to Longcheng, now decided to arrive at Longcheng to mourn his father, judging correctly that Lan Han would not kill him both because he was Lan's son-in-law and because he pitied Murong Sheng for the destruction of his clan. As Murong Sheng arrived at Longcheng, his wife Princess Consort Lan further bowed not only to her father but her brothers as well, begging for Murong Sheng's life, and she was joined by Lan Han's wife Lady Yi. Lan Han therefore spared him. Murong Sheng soon managed to sow seeds of suspicion between Lan Han and his brothers Lan Jia'nan and Lan Ti (蘭堤). He created his son Lan Mu (蘭穆) crown prince.

Lan Han also spared Murong Qi (慕容奇) the Prince of Taiyuan, whose mother was also a daughter of Lan Han. Murong Sheng and Murong Qi then conspired for Murong Qi to flee out of the city and start an uprising. Murong Sheng, meanwhile, suggested to Lan Han that Lan Ti, not himself, was behind Murong Qi's rebellion. Further, at this time, because of a severe drought, Lan Han went to pray to the Later Yan ancestral temples and Murong Bao's spirit, blaming Murong Bao's murder on Lan Jia'nan. Upon hearing these things, Lan Ti and Lan Jia'nan became angry and started a rebellion of their own. Lan Mu, meanwhile, suggested that Murong Sheng be killed, and Lan Han initially agreed, but Murong Sheng, upon hearing the news through Princess Consort Lan, declined to attend an imperial meeting that Lan Han called, and Lan Han soon changed his mind.

Soon thereafter, after Lan Mu had won a victory over Lan Ti and Lan Jia'nan, Lan Han held a feast for the soldiers, at which both he and Lan Mu became extremely drunk. Murong Sheng used this opportunity to join some army officers whom he had persuaded to join his cause, and they killed Lan Han and Lan Mu, and then Lan Ti, Lan Jia'nan, and Lan Han's other sons Lan He (蘭和) the Duke of Lu and Lan Yang (蘭揚) the Duke of Chen. Murong Sheng then took the throne.
