= Empress Dowager Duan (Zhaowen) =

Empress Dowager Duan (段太后, personal name unknown) was an empress dowager of China's Xianbei-led Later Yan dynasty.
