= Zhai Liao =

Zhai Liao 翟遼
- Heavenly King of Wei

Heavenly King of Zhai Wei
- Reign: 388–391
- Successor: Zhai Zhao
- Born: Unknown
- Died: 391
Full name
- Family name: Zhái (翟); Given name: Liáo (遼)
Era name and dates
- Jiànguāng (建光): 388–391
Regnal name
- Heavenly King of Wei (魏天王)
- Dynasty: Zhai Wei

Zhai Liao (Chinese: 翟遼; died 391) was a leader of the western Dingling horde and the founder of the Dingling-led Zhai Wei dynasty of China. During his reign, he used the monarchical title of Heavenly King.

== Early career ==
Zhai Liao, a royal family member of the West Ding Ling, followed the horde migrate from Kazakhstan into China, his cousin Zhai Bin (翟斌), khan of the horde, who wage war against Former Qin's emperor Fu Jiān in 383, supported Later Yan's founding emperor Murong Chui when Murong Chui rebelled against Former Qin as well and established Later Yan. However, in 384, as Murong Chui sieged the important city Yecheng, which was defended by Fu Jiān's son Fu Pi, Zhai Bin, seeing that Murong Chui was unable to capture the city quickly, began to consider other options. When, in particular, he requested a prime ministerial title from Murong Chui and was refused, Zhai Bin prepared to ally with Fu Pi instead, but his plan was discovered, and he was ambushed, along with his brothers Zhai Tan (翟檀) and Zhai Min (翟敏). It was apparently at this time that Zhai Liao and his cousin Zhai Zhen (翟真) fled with some of their Dingling troops and resisted Later Yan's subsequent campaigns to take the territory north of and around the Yellow River. In late 384, Zhai Liao was defeated by Murong Chui's sons Murong Lin and Murong Nong and forced to flee to his cousin Zhai Zhen. In 385, Zhai Zhen's subordinate Xianyu Qi (鮮于乞) assassinated him and attempted to take over, but the Zhai family struck back and killed him; another cousin of Zhai Liao's, Zhai Cheng (翟成), succeeded Zhai Zhen, but many of their subordinates surrendered to Later Yan. In fall 385, Murong Chui attacked Zhai Cheng, instead, Murong Chui had huge casualties and lose the advantage of the battle, but Zhai Cheng's subordinate Xianyu De (鮮于得) assassinated Zhai Cheng and surrendered his army. His surrendered Dingling troops were largely slaughtered.

However, Zhai Liao escaped the massacre and sought refuge with Teng Tianzhi (滕恬之), Jin's governor of Liyang Commandery (黎陽, roughly modern Hebi, Henan). Teng trusted Zhai Liao greatly, and Zhai Liao, because Teng's overdedication to hunting and ignorance of his soldiers' needs, began to develop relationships with soldiers with his popular among them. In 386, when Teng was on a campaign, he commissioned Zhai Liao to keep guard of Liyang; instead, Zhai Liao succeeded Liyang after Teng was ambushed during campaign. During the next two years, Zhai Liao begin to gather his lost DingLing subjects, his horde slowly reformed, same time, he repeatedly tried to attack Jin, but was repelled in his efforts, and he apparently entered into an alliance with Western Yan's emperor Murong Yong. In 387, Murong Chui betrayed alliance, attacked Zhai Liao, and many of Zhai Liao's subordinates suicided after month without food and water during the siege. Zhai Liao led reinforcements to crush the siege and defeated the Yan army. For peace treaty, Murong Chui created him the Duke of Henan.

== Establishment of Wei ==
In winter 387, Zhai Liao repudiated allegiance to Later Yan and attacked Later Yan's Qinghe (清河, roughly modern Xingtai, Hebei) and Pingyuan (平原, roughly modern Dezhou, Shandong) Commanderies. In spring 388, he sent his subordinate Sui Qiong (眭瓊) to apologize to Murong Chui, but Murong Chui no longer believed him, and killed Sui, sent his head back, to show a great disrespect and that he was not interested. Same year, Zhai Liao adopted Chinese tradition, went on the throne, supported by his horde, his XianBei and Chinese army, created the first Ding Ling Empire in China, and titled Wei Empire. He himself had been titled the Khagan or Heavenly King. He also started new era name and established an imperial government, replaced ancient Siberian ruling structure with Chinese structure. He then moved the capital to Huatai (滑台, in modern Anyang, Henan). In 389, he captured Jin's Yingyang Commandery (滎陽, roughly modern Zhengzhou, Henan). He also sent his general Gu Ti (故堤) to pretend to surrender to the Later Yan Prince of Lelang, Murong Wen (慕容溫) and assassinate Murong Wen, although that maneuver yielded him no territory as Gu's forces were quickly destroyed by Murong Nong. In fall 390, Jin general Liu Laozhi (劉牢之) attacked Zhai Liao, capturing Juancheng (鄄城, in modern Puyang, Henan), forcing Zhai Liao's son Zhai Zhao, who was in charge of the city, to flee, and then defeated Zhai Liao near his capital Huatai, but did not destroy Wei.

In 391, Zhai Liao died. He was succeeded by his son Zhai Zhao.
