= Fu Song'e =

Fu Song'e (苻娀娥, died September 404) was a consort of Murong Xi (Emperor Zhaowen), emperor of the Xianbei-led Chinese Later Yan dynasty. She was posthumously honored as Empress Min (愍皇后).

She was the older sister of Murong Xi's empress Fu Xunying.

== Early life ==
Fu Song'e was the oldest daughter of Fu Mo (苻謨), the mayor of Later Yan's capital Zhongshan (中山, in modern Baoding, Hebei) in the 390s. Shortly after the Later Yan emperor Murong Bao (Emperor Huimin) abandoned Zhongshan in face of Northern Wei military attacks, Fu Mo was killed by Murong Xiang (慕容詳) the Duke of Kaifeng, who wanted to be emperor himself. His family was also slaughtered. Somehow, however, Fu Song'e and her younger sister Fu Xunying were not killed—perhaps they escaped the slaughter, or perhaps they were not in Zhongshan at that point.

== As Murong Xi's consort ==
After Murong Xi became emperor in 401, he took Fu Song'e and Fu Xunying as imperial consorts in late 401 and greatly favored them. Both of them were described as beautiful and charming. Murong Xi was said to have granted every wish from the sisters, and providing them with so much luxury that his small empire's resources were highly drained. Fu Song'e liked to travel as a commoner and throw banquets, and Murong Xi permitted her this indulgence. He also ordered the construction of Quguang Hai (曲光海; "Bent-Light Sea") and Qingliang Chi (清涼池; "Cool Pond") specifically for her. During the hot summer, half of the laborers and soldiers in the construction work died from the heat.

Murong Xi however preferred the younger sister Fu Xunying, whom he made the empress in January 404.

== Death ==
In September 404, when Fu Song'e was taken ill, a man named Wang Rong (王榮) in the capital Longcheng (龍城, in modern Chaoyang, Liaoning) volunteered to treat her and promised a cure. However, Fu Song'e died soon after, and Murong Xi was so enraged that he had Wang Rong dismembered and his corpse burned in public.
