= Dingling =

Ancient Siberian culture

The Dingling and contemporary Asian polities circa 100 BCE.

The Dingling (Note: Chinese: 丁零 (174 BCE); 丁靈 (200 BCE); Eastern Han Chinese: *teŋ-leŋ < Old Chinese: *têŋ-rêŋ) were an ancient people who appear in Chinese historiography in the context of the 1st century BCE.

The Dingling are considered to have been an early Turkic-speaking people. They were also proposed to be the ancestors of Tungusic speakers among the later Shiwei people, or are related to Na-Dené and Yeniseian speakers.

Modern archaeologists have identified the Dingling as belonging to the eastern Scythian horizon, namely the Tagar culture.

== Etymology ==
The ethnonym 'Dingling' is regarded by modern scholars in the Western world as being interchangeable with the ethnonym 'Tiele', who are believed to be the descendants of the Dingling. Chinese historiographers believed that 'Tiele' was a mistaken transcription, related them to the ancient Red Di (狄翟), and recorded various names like Dili (狄历), Gaoche (高車) or Chile (敕勒).

Several modern scholars, including Peter B. Golden, now believe that all of these ethnonyms described by the Chinese all derive from Altaic exonyms describing wheeled vehicles, with 'Dingling' perhaps being an earlier rendering of a Tuoba word (*tegreg), meaning "wagon".

Peter Golden also wrote that "Gaoche" or "high carts" may be a translation of "Dingling et al.". Edwin Pulleyblank writes that "High Cart" is just one of several variations of exonyms that ultimately reflect the original Turkic meaning of 'Dingling', which is possibly derived from *Tägräg, meaning "circle, hoop".

== Origin and migration ==
The Weilüe mentioned three Dingling groups:

- one group south of Majing (馬脛, literally: "Horse-Shank[ed people]"), north of Kangju, and west of Wusun;
- another south of the North Sea, identified as Lake Baikal;
- and another north of Xiongnu and neighbouring the Qushi (屈射), Hunyun (渾窳), Gekun (隔昆), and Xinli (薪犁), all of whom had once been conquered by the Xiongnu.

Murphy (2003) proposes that the Dingling's country had been in the Minusinsk Basin on the Yenisey river, thus close to the location of the Dingling group who neighbored the Kangju, Wusun, and Majing people. Dingling gradually moved southward to Mongolia and northern China. They were a huge independent horde for centuries, but were later defeated and temporarily became subject of the Xiongnu Empire, and thus presumably related to the invaders known as Huns in the west. One group, known as the West Dingling, remained in an area that would become Kazakhstan, while others – expelled from Mongolia by the Rouran – settled in the Tarim Basin during the 5th century and took control of Turpan.

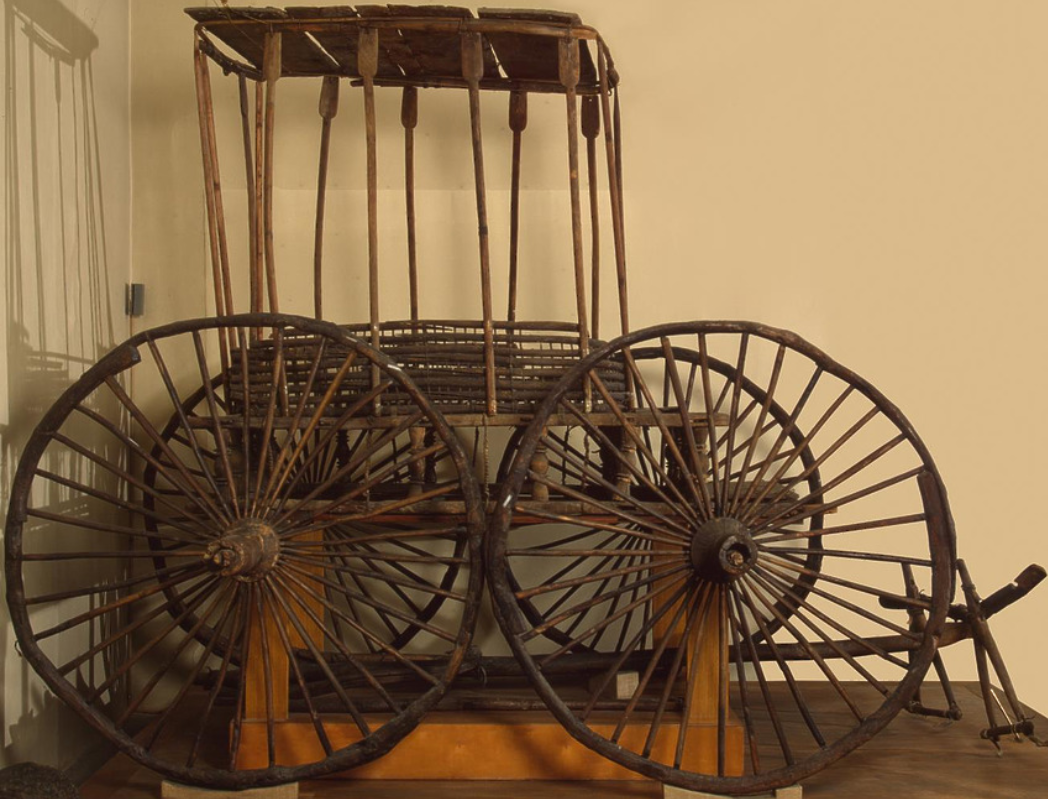
An eastern Scythian cart from Pazyryk. The tall wheels of this cart are related to those used by the Dingling and other Turkic nomads, which provides evidence of cultural continuity between the Scythians and the Turkic peoples.

The Dingling had a warlike society, formed by traders, hunters, fishers, and gatherers, living a semi-nomadic life in the southern Siberian mountain taiga region from Lake Baikal to northern Mongolia. Some ancient sources claims that Di or Zhai (翟) was adopted as the group name because the Zhai family had been the ruling house for centuries.

Other sources claim that they might have been correlated with the Guifang, a northern tribe that appears in the oracle bone inscriptions from Yinxu.

According to the History of the Gaoche of Wei Shou (6th century), the origin of the Dingling can be traced to the Chidi (赤狄) (lit. Red Di), who lived in northern China during the Spring and Autumn period. The Mozi mentions a total of eight related Di groups, of whom only "Red Di" (赤狄, Chidi), the "White Di" (白狄, Baidi), and "Tall Di" (長狄, Changdi) are known.

To the north of the Xiongnu empire and Dingling territories, at the headwaters of the Yenisei around Tannu Uriankhai, lived the Gekun (鬲昆), also known as the Yenisei Kyrgyz in later records. Further to the west near the Irtysh river lived the Hujie (呼揭). Other tribes living of the Xiongnu, such as the Hunyu (浑庾), Qushe (屈射), and Xinli (薪犁), were only mentioned once in Chinese records, and their exact location is unknown.

During the 2nd century BCE, the Dingling became subjects of Modu Chanyu along with 26 other tribes, including the Yuezhi and Wusun.

=== Dingling and Xiongnu ===
The Dingling were first subjugated by the Xiongnu, but the latter gradually weakened. In 71 BCE, after numerous conflicts between the Chinese and the Xiongnu, the Dingling, led by Zhai Jin, with help from neighboring tribes, took the opportunity to revolt. From 63 to 60 BCE, during a split within the Xiongnu ruling clan of Luanti (挛鞮), the Dingling attacked the Xiongnu, together with the Wusun from the west, supported by the Chinese from the south and the Wuhuan from the southeast.

In 51 BCE, the Dingling, together with the Hujie and Gekun, were defeated by the Xiongnu under Zhizhi Chanyu, on his way to Kangju. Over the next century there may have been more uprisings, but the only recorded one was in the year 85, when together with the Xianbei they made their final attack on the Xiongnu, and Dingling regained its power under Zhai Ying. After that, under the Dingling pressure, the remaining of northern Xiongnu and the Tuoba formed the confederacy by Xianbei chief Tanshihuai (檀石槐). After his death in 181, the Xianbei moved south and the Dingling took their place on the steppe.

Some groups of Dingling, called the West Dingling by the ancient Chinese, started to migrate into western Asia, but settled in Kangju (康居), modern day Kazakhstan and Uzbekistan. There is no specific source to tell where exactly they settled, but some claim Lake Zaysan (宰桑 or 斋桑).

=== Assimilation ===
Between the short-lived Xianbei confederacy in 181 and the foundation of the Rouran Qaghanate in 402, there was a long period without a tribal confederacy on the steppe. During this period, a part of the Dingling were assimilated to the northern Xiongnu by permanently settling further to the south. Another group, documented as about 450,000, moved southeast and merged into the Xianbei.

Some groups of Dingling settled in China during Wang Mang's reign. According to the Weilüe, another group of Dingling escaped to the western steppe in Kazakhstan, which has been called the West Dingling. Around the 3rd century, Dinglings living in China began to adopt family names such as Zhai or Di (翟), Xianyu (鲜于), Luo (洛) and Yan (严). These Dingling became part of the southern Xiongnu tribes known as Chile (赤勒) during the 3rd century, from which the name Chile (敕勒) originated.

During the Sixteen Kingdoms period, the West Dingling Khan Zhai Bin (翟斌) lead his hordes, migrate from Kazakhstan into Central China, served under the Former Qin, after series of plotting, Zhai Bin was betrayed by Former Qin, to avoid Qin nobles further attempts, he revolted against the Former Qin Dynasty. Murong Chui (慕容垂), the Xianbei leader under Former Qin court, got appointed as the high command of Former Qin army, was expected to take down the revolt, but convinced by Zhai Bin, joined his mutiny to against Former Qin. Their mutiny were also joined by several other Xianbei tribes which formed the Anti-Qin leagues, with the suggestion by Zhai Bin, Murong Chui was elected to be the leader of the leagues. Near end of the same year, Murong Chui styled himself King of Yan (燕王), left Zhai Bin the new leader of the league and a dilemma of the war, later Murong Chui broke the alliance with the leagues, murdered Zhai Bin and his three sons in an ambush. His nephew Zhai Zhen (翟真) inherited the horde, was elected be the new Leader of the leagues, seeking for revenge, but later assassinated by his military advisor Xianyu Qi (鲜于乞), Xian did not escape far, were caught by the Dingling soldiers and got executed, the leagues elected Zhai Zhen's cousin Zhai Cheng (翟成) as the new Leader, but later also been assassinated by Yan spy, then Zhai Liao (翟辽), became the new leader of Dingling horde, with the support from the Leagues, he founded the Wei state, a DingLing Dynasty in China in modern Henan Province.

About one-quarter of the Tuoba clans show similar names as found among the later Gaoche and Tiele tribes. Among them, the Hegu (紇骨) and Yizhan (乙旃) clans kept their high status.

Between the 4th and 7th centuries, the name "Dingling" slowly disappeared from Chinese records, coinciding with the rise of the Uyghur Khaganate.

== Cultural and linguistic theories ==
Dingling
- Region: northern China
- Ethnicity: Dingling
- Extinct: after 7th century
- Language family: Turkic

Language codes
- ISO 639-3: None (mis)
- Glottolog: None

Several theories have been proposed about the relationship between the Dingling and both ancient and living cultures, based on linguistic, historical and archaeological evidence. It is now widely accepted that the Dingling were a Turkic people group.

=== Turkic hypothesis ===
Weilüe records the Dingling word for the arctic fox (vulpes lagopus) as 昆子 kūnzǐ (Middle Chinese (ZS): *kuən-t͡sɨ^{X} < Early Middle Chinese: *kwən-tsɨ’/tsi’ < Eastern Han Chinese: *kûn-tsəʔ), which is proposed to be from Proto-Turkic *qïrsaq ~ *karsak.

=== Tungusic hypothesis ===
Chinese historians linked the Tungusic speakers among the later Shiwei people to the Dingling, considering them as descendants of the Dingling owing to linguistic similarities. (Note: Shiwei were stated in most Chinese sources (e.g. Weishu 100, Suishu 84, Jiu Tangshu 199) to be relatives to para-Mongolic-speaking Khitans; the Shiwei sub-tribe Mengwu (蒙兀) / Mengwa (蒙瓦) were considered ancestral to the Mongols.)

=== Dené-Yeniseian hypothesis ===
In Zur jenissejisch-indianischen Urverwandtschaft (Concerning Yeniseian-Indian Primal Relationship), the German scholar Heinrich Werner developed a new language family which he termed Baikal–Siberic. By extension, he groups together the Yeniseian peoples (Arin, Assan, Yugh, Ket, Kott, and Pumpokol), the Na-Dene Indigenous peoples of the Americas, and the Dingling of Chinese chronicles to Proto-Dingling. The linguistic comparison of Na-Dene and Yeniseian shows that the quantity and character of the correspondences points to a possible common origin. According to Russian linguistic experts, they likely spoke a polysynthetic or synthetic language with an active form of morphosyntactic alignment, exhibiting a linguistically and culturally unified community.

The name Dingling resembles both:

- the Yeniseian word *dzheng people > Ket de?ng, Yug dyeng, Kott cheang
- the Na-Dene word *ling or *hling people, i.e. as manifested in the name of the Tlingit (properly hling-git son of man, child of the people).

Although the Dené–Yeniseian language family is now a widely known proposal, his inclusion of the Dingling is not widely accepted.

== Physical appearance ==
There is some evidence that the Dingling looked similar to European people, based on their identification with the Tagar culture of the Altai region in Siberia. In the 20th century, several historians proposed that the Tagar people were characterized by a high frequency of light hair and light eyes, and that the associated Dingling were blond-haired. Genetic testing of fossils from the Tagar culture has confirmed the theory that they were often blue eyed and light-haired. Twenty-first century scholars continue to describe the Dingling in a similar manner. Adrienne Mayor repeated N. Ishjants' description (1994) of the Dingling as "red-haired, blue-eyed giants" while M.V. Dorina called the Dingling "European-looking."

The Chinese sources do not differentiate the Dingling's appearance from the Han Chinese. Chinese histories unanimously depict the Dingling as the ancestors of the Tiele, whose physical appearance is also not described, but seem to have included non-Turkic speaking peoples. The Alans, an Iranic people, are included among them, as well as the Bayegu, who had a somewhat different language than the Tiele according to the New Book of Tang. The New Book also relates that the Kyrgyz intermixed with the Dingling. The Book of Sui states that the Tiele had similar customs to the Göktürks but different marriage and burial traditions.

The Classic of Mountains and Seas described the Dingling as human beings with horses' legs and hooves and excellent at running. However, this description is mythological in nature. A similar description is also echoed in a Wusun account, recorded in the Weilüe (compiled 239-265 CE), which describes the men of Majing ("Horse Shanks"), located north of the Dingling, as possessing horse legs and hooves.

== See also ==
- List of indigenous peoples of Russia
- Xunyu
- Zhai Wei
