= Murong De =

Emperor of Southern Yan from 398 to 405

Emperor Xianwu of Southern Yan 南燕獻武帝
- Emperor of Southern Yan
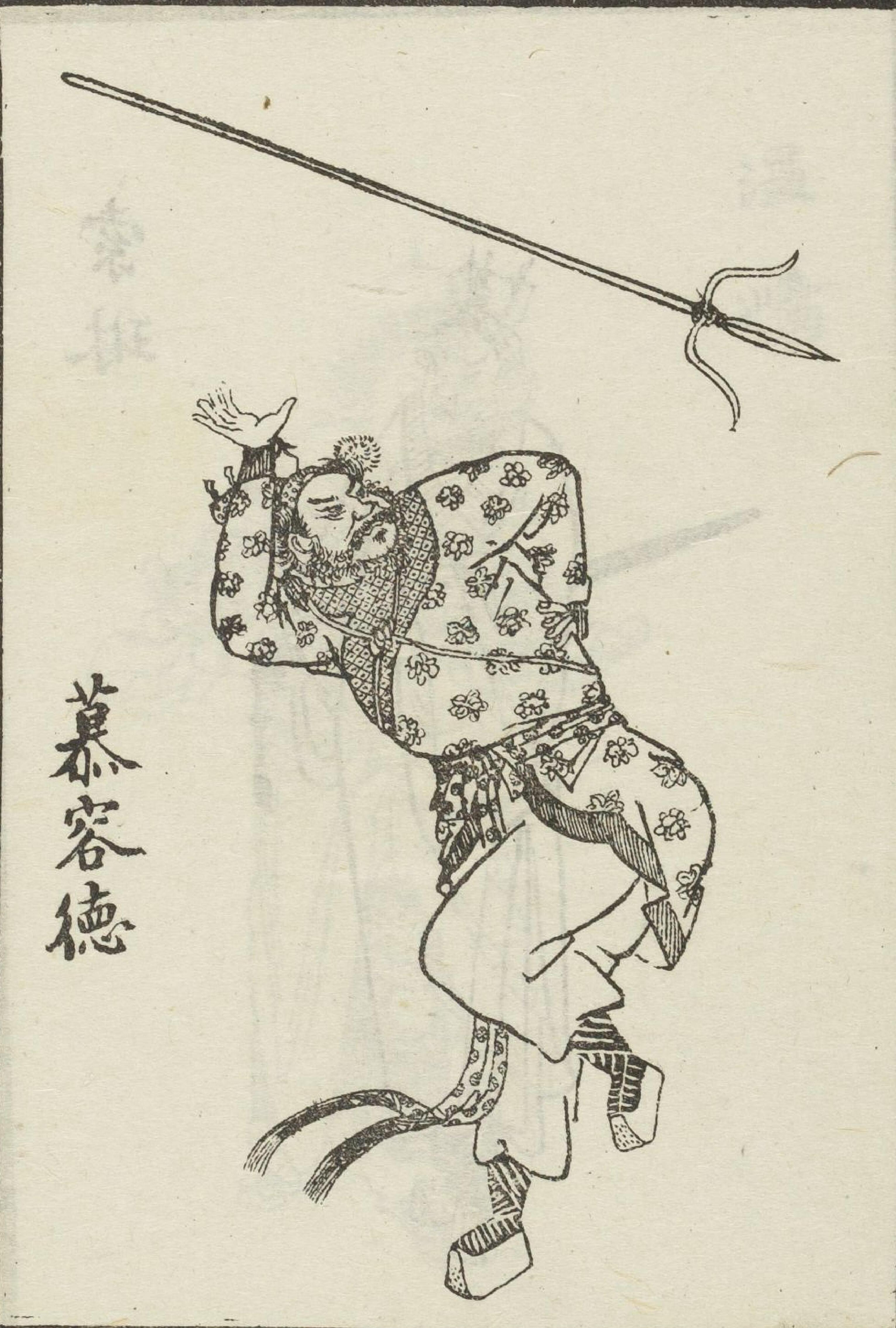

Ruler of Southern Yan
- Reign: 398 – 17 November 405
- Successor: Murong Chao
- Born: Mùróng Dé (慕容德); 336
- Died: 17 November 405 (aged 69)
- Burial: Dongyang Mausoleum (東陽陵)
- Spouse: Duan Jifei
- Issue: Princess Pingyuan; Princess Le'an; Murong Chao (adopted)
Full name
- Family name: Mùróng (慕容); Given name: Bèidé (備德)
Era name and dates
- Jiànpíng (建平): 400–405
Regnal name
- Prince of Yan (燕王, 398–400); Emperor (since 400)
Posthumous name
- Emperor Xianwu (獻武皇帝)
Temple name
- Shizong (世宗)
- House: Murong
- Dynasty: Southern Yan
- Father: Murong Huang

Murong De (Chinese: 慕容德; 336–405), name changed in 400 to Murong Beide (慕容備德), courtesy name Xuanming (玄明), also known by his posthumous name as the Emperor Xianwu of Southern Yan (南燕獻武帝), was the founding emperor of the Xianbei-led Southern Yan dynasty of China. He was the son of Former Yan's founding prince Murong Huang (Prince Wenming) and younger brother to both Former Yan emperor Murong Jun (Emperor Jingzhao) and Later Yan emperor Murong Chui (Emperor Wucheng), and therefore was an imperial prince and general during the times of both states. After Murong Chui's son Murong Bao lost most of the Later Yan's territory to the Northern Wei dynasty, Murong De took troops under his own command south and established Southern Yan, which secured modern Shandong, but failed to expand further, and was destroyed by the Eastern Jin dynasty after Murong De's death and succession by his nephew Murong Chao. The Book of Jin described Murong De as having a stalwart and extraordinary appearance and was about two metres tall.

== During Former Yan ==
Murong De was born in 336 to Murong Huang and his concubine Consort Gongsun, who had previously given birth to his older brother Murong Na (慕容納). At that time, Murong Huang was the Duke of Liaodong and a vassal of Jin, although in 337 he claimed for himself the title of Prince of Yan (as Prince Wenming). As this was without Jin authorization (although Emperor Cheng of Jin would retroactively recognize this in 341 by creating him that title), this generally was considered the founding of the independent Former Yan state. When he was young, he was regarded as studious, handsome, and talented.

In 354, after Murong De's older brother Murong Jun (Emperor Jingzhao) formally broke from Jin and claimed imperial title, he created Murong De the Duke of Liang. Sometime after Murong Jun died in 360 and was succeeded by his son Murong Wei, Murong De was created the Prince of Fanyang. By 368, he was the mayor of the capital Yecheng (鄴城, in modern Handan, Hebei) when four dukes of the rival Former Qin rebelled against Former Qin's emperor Fu Jiān. Murong De suggested to the regent, his uncle Murong Ping, that Former Yan activate its troops to aid one of them, Fu Sou (苻廋) the Duke of Wei and further take the chance to conquer Former Qin, but his strategy was rejected by Murong Ping.

In 369, when the Jin general Huan Wen launched a major attack on Former Yan, seeking to destroy it, Huan was initially successful and reached Yecheng's vicinity. Murong De's older brother Murong Chui volunteered to make one last attempt against Huan, and Murong De was a general under his command. Together, they dealt Huan a major defeat, forcing Huan to abandon his campaign. However, later that year, Murong Chui, under suspicion by Murong Ping and Murong Wei's mother Empress Dowager Kezuhun, was forced to flee to Former Qin, and because of the close relationship Murong De had with Murong Chui, Murong De was removed from his post as the mayor of Yecheng. After Former Qin conquered Former Yan in 370, Murong De, as other princes of the Murong clan did, surrendered to Former Qin forces.

== During Former Qin ==
(Nan) Yan Xianwudi ((南)燕獻武帝)
Family name:	Murong (慕容, mù róng)
Given name:	Initially De (德, dé), later Beide (備德, bèi dé) (changed 400)
Temple name:	Shizong (世宗, shì zōng)
Posthumous name:	Xianwu (獻武, xiàn wǔ) literary meaning: "wise and martial"

Fu Jiān made most Former Yan princes commandery governors in his empire, and both Murong De and his brother Murong Na were commissioned as such, but Murong Na was soon removed from his office, and both Murong Na and their mother Consort Gongsun relocated to Murong De's post at Zhangye Commandery (張掖, roughly modern Zhangye, Gansu). Around or in 383, when Fu Jiān prepared a campaign to destroy Jin and unite China, Murong De and his troops were mobilized, and he left his own sons, Murong Na, and Consort Gongsun in Zhangye; before leaving, he gave his mother a golden knife as a sign of his devotion.

After Fu Jiān's defeat by Jin forces at the Battle of Fei River, Murong De first tried to persuade Murong Chui, to whose camp Fu Jiān had fled, to kill Fu Jiān and start a rebellion to rebuild Yan. When Murong Chui refused, citing Fu Jiān's kindness to him, Murong De then tried to persuade Murong Wei to do so, but Murong Wei also refused.

In spring 384, however, Murong Chui did start a rebellion near Luoyang, and after he claimed the title of Prince of Yan, thus establishing Later Yan, he created Murong De his old title of Prince of Fanyang. When the news reached Zhangye, the commandery governor Fu Chang (苻昌) arrested and executed Murong Na and all of Murong De's sons (and presumably their mother(s)). Consort Gongsun was spared because of her old age, while Murong Na's wife Lady Duan, who was then pregnant, was imprisoned to await for execution after she gave birth. Consort Gongsun and Lady Duan, however, were rescued by Murong De's former subordinate Huyan Ping (呼延平), who escorted them to the Qiang tribes.

== During Later Yan ==
=== During Murong Chui's reign ===
During Murong Chui's reign, Murong De served as a chief official and general, and Murong Chui often listened to his advice. For the first several years of Later Yan's existence, he often carried out campaigns to secure areas that were being held by semi-independent warlords. In particular, around the new year 387, he, assisted by his nephew Murong Long, was successful in defeating the Jin vassal Wen Xiang (溫詳) and the Jin rebel Zhang Yuan (張願), taking the territory near the Yellow River.

In or around 388, Murong De married Duan Jifei, the younger sister of Murong Chui's wife, Empress Duan Yuanfei. (His previous wife, if any, was probably executed by Fu Chang when he rebelled with Murong Chui.)

In 389, Murong De, along with his nephew Murong Lin, waged a successful campaign against the Xianbei Helan (賀蘭) tribe, forcing the submission of its chief Helan Na (賀蘭訥).

In 393, when Murong Chui considered conquering the rival claimant (to rightful succession to Former Yan) Murong Yong of Western Yan, most officials opposed the proposal, arguing that the troops were worn out. Murong De was one of the few who agreed with the proposal, reasoning that Murong Yong was causing confusing among the people as to who was the legitimate successor. Murong Chui agreed, and in 394 carried out campaigns that led to Western Yan's destruction.

In 395, Murong De was one of the generals who served under the command of Murong Chui's crown prince Murong Bao in an action calculated to punish Northern Wei's prince Tuoba Gui's pillaging of Later Yan borders, but with Murong Bao's incompetence, even with Murong De and other capable generals on staff, the army was crushed by Northern Wei at the Battle of Canhe Slope, and most of the army was captured and then slaughtered by Northern Wei.

After the defeat at Canhe Slope, Murong De suggested to Murong Chui that if he did not conquer Northern Wei, Northern Wei would pose a future threat, since Tuoba Gui now would take Murong Bao lightly. Murong Chui agreed, and in 396 carried out a major attack on Northern Wei again. The campaign was initially successful, but as the army passed through Canhe Slope, the army was so mournful that Murong Chui became embarrassed and angry, and he fell ill. The army was forced to withdraw, and Murong Chui died on the way back to the capital Zhongshan (中山, also in modern Baoding). Murong Bao succeeded Murong Chui.

=== During Murong Bao's reign ===
After Murong Bao became emperor, he made Murong De the viceroy at Yecheng, over the southern empire. Soon, however, the entire state was under Northern Wei attack, and Murong Bao decided to defend just large cities in the Hebei plains to wear down Northern Wei troops, while Northern Wei took the rest of the territory. Eventually, only Zhongshan and Yecheng remained in Later Yan hands. Murong De fought off several attempts by Northern Wei to capture Yecheng, but in the meantime, Murong Bao had abandoned Zhongshan and fled back to the old Former Yan capital Longcheng (龍城, in modern Jinzhou, Liaoning), and Murong De lost regular contact with him. On several occasions his subordinates asked him to take imperial title, but each time, after receiving confirmation that Murong Bao was still alive, he did not do so. In late 397, a proposal by Murong De to Murong Bao to advance south to recover the lost territory reached Murong Bao, and Murong Bao agreed and prepared for a major campaign in 398.

Meanwhile, however, Murong Lin, who had briefly claimed imperial title himself, fled to Yecheng and suggested to Murong De to abandon Yecheng, which he considered too large to defend properly, and head south of the Yellow River to Huatai (滑台, in modern Anyang, Henan). Murong De agreed, and in spring 398 abandoned Yecheng, taking his troops to Huatai. There, Murong Lin offered imperial title to him, and while Murong De declined, he claimed the title of Prince of Yan—the same title that Murong Chui took to show independence—and thus establishing Southern Yan.

== Reign ==
After Murong Lin offered imperial title to Murong De, however, he immediately plotted another rebellion. Murong De executed him.

Soon, Murong De had to consider whether to kill another nephew. Murong Bao had, unaware that Murong De had effectively declared independence, started a campaign against Northern Wei, but his tired soldiers mutinied, initially forcing him back to Longcheng, and then further capturing Longcheng and forcing him to flee south. He arrived near Huatai, still unaware of Murong De's assumption of Prince of Yan title, and sent out the eunuch Zhao Si (趙思) as a messenger to Murong De, asking Murong De to send a force to escort him to safety. Murong De initially considered abdicating and welcoming Murong Bao back, but after contrary advice by Zhang Hua (張華) and Muyu Hu (慕輿護), he changed his mind and was prepared to seize Murong Bao and put him to death, but by the time that a detachment commanded by Muyu arrived at Murong Bao's hiding spot, Murong Bao had discovered what happened and fled back north. Murong De kept Zhao, but after Zhao cursed him for having been an usurper, he executed Zhao.

In 399, the general Fu Guang (苻廣), brother of the Former Qin emperor Fu Deng, had heard prophecies that Former Qin would soon be reestablished, and therefore declared a rebellion, claiming the title of Prince of Qin. Murong De personally attacked Fu Guang and killed him, but as he did so, his nephew Murong He (慕容和) the Prince of Luyang, left to guard Huatai, was assassinated by his general Li Bian (李辯), who then offered the city to Northern Wei. Northern Wei's viceroy Suhe Ba (素和跋) quickly entered Huatai and defeated returning armies commanded by Murong De and his cousin Murong Zhen (慕容鎮) the Prince of Guiyang, and the other cities of the Huatai region then surrendered to Northern Wei as well. Murong De considered putting Huatai under siege, but at the advice of his general Han Fan (韓範), who argued that sieging Huatai would be difficult, he took his troops and advanced east instead, against the Jin governor of Qing Province (青州, modern central and eastern Shandong), Pilü Hun (辟閭渾). In fall 399, he captured the capital of Qing Province, Guanggu (廣固, in modern Qingzhou, Shandong), killing Pilü, and making Guanggu his new capital. From this point on, Murong De carried out few military campaigns, appearing to be content with controlling his small but stable empire.

In 400, Murong De claimed the title of emperor, and he changed his name from Murong De to Murong Beide (慕容備德) to allow his people easier obedience of naming taboo rules—and presumably, this meant that the people would only be in violation of the taboo on his name if they used "Beide" together, not "Bei" or "De" individually, as both were common characters. He created Princess Duan empress.

Murong De, once he settled in at Guanggu, sent out multiple missions to try to find the fate of his mother Consort Gongsun and his brother Murong Na. In 401, he sent his official Du Hong (杜弘), compensating Du by making his father Du Xiong (杜雄) a county magistrate, but after Du Hong arrived in Zhangye, before finding out more, he was killed by bandits. In 403, however, after his former subordinate Zhao Rong (趙融) arrived from Later Qin territory, Zhao told him that Consort Gongsun and Murong Na were both deceased, and Murong De mourned them so greatly that he became ill—and from that point on, his health became precarious.

Also in 403, at Murong De's permission, the official Han Zhuo (Han Fan's brother, name not in Unicode) carried out a reform of a policy that Murong De had previously established—that if people in his state had been forcibly relocated, they would be exempt from property taxes, which however led to fraudulent claims of forcible relocation—leading to restoration of proper taxation.

In 402, in the aftermaths of Huan Xuan's takeover of the Jin regency by force, several generals who unsuccessfully opposed Huan—Liu Gui (劉軌), Sima Xiuzhi (司馬休之), Gao Yazhi (高雅之), and Liu Jingxuan (劉敬宣) -- fled to Southern Yan. In 403, Gao submitted a proposal to Murong De to attack Huan, hoping to either conquer Jin or at least seize the Jin territory north of the Yangtze River. Han Fan agreed with the proposal, feeling that Huan was not a good general and could be easily defeated. Murong De was hesitant—citing that he had long wanted to recover territory from Northern Wei and never considered advancing south—and then, with a number of other generals agreeing with him, did not carry out Gao's plan. Apparently disappointed, in 404, Gao and Liu Jingxuan plotted to assassinate Murong De and replace him with Sima Xiuzhi, but the plot was leaked after they told Liu Gui, who disagreed with the plot. Liu Gui and Gao were arrested and executed, and Liu Jingxuan and Sima Xiuzhi fled back to Jin (where Huan had since been defeated by Liu Yu).

In summer 405, Murong Na's only surviving son Murong Chao (born posthumously after Murong Na's death), who was then in the Later Qin capital Chang'an, fled to Southern Yan, proving his identity by presenting Murong De with the golden knife that he had left his mother Consort Gongsun. Murong De was both happy and mournful, and he created Murong Chao the Prince of Beihai—the same title that Murong Na carried during Former Yan. Since Murong De was without any surviving sons, he intended to make Murong Chao his heir, and therefore selected capable men to be Murong Chao's assistants. Murong Chao impressed most Southern Yan officials, and most considered him the rightful heir. Several months later, during the fall, Murong De fell ill, and he created Murong Chao crown prince. He died soon thereafter, and Murong Chao succeeded him. Murong De's burial was done in an odd way, probably at his own instruction; after he died, more than 10 caskets were carried out of the various gates of Guanggu and buried in secret spots, with only one of them containing the real body of Murong De. After the official mourning period, an empty casket was buried with imperial honors.

== Personal information ==
- Father
  - Murong Huang (Prince Wenming of Former Yan)
- Mother
  - Consort Gongsun
- Wife
  - Empress Duan Jifei (created 400)
- Daughter
  - Princess Pingyuan
  - Princess Le'an, married Lan Gui Duke of Yiyang

Emperor Xianwu of (Southern) Yan House of Murong Born: 336 Died: 405
Regnal titles
Preceded by Murong Bao as Emperor of Later Yan	Emperor of Southern Yan; 398–405	Succeeded by Murong Chao
Titles in pretence
Preceded by Murong Bao	— TITULAR — Emperor of China; 398–405; Reason for succession failure: Sixteen Kingdoms	Succeeded by Murong Chao
Preceded by Emperor An of Jin	— TITULAR — Emperor of China; 398–405; Reason for succession failure: Sixteen Kingdoms	Succeeded by Emperor Daowu of Northern Wei
