= Southern Yan =

Xianbei-led Chinese dynastic state (398–410)

Yan 燕
- 398–410
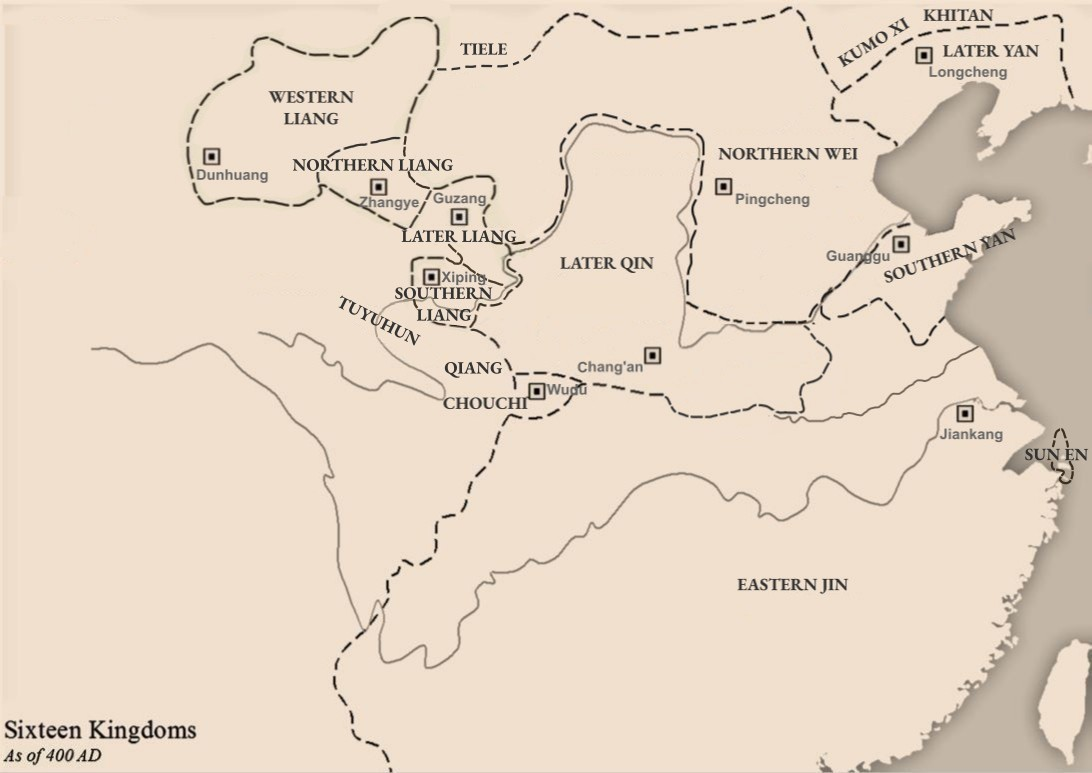
- Southern Yan in 400 AD
- Capital: Huatai (398–399); Guanggu (399–410)
- Government: Monarchy
- Emperor
  - 398–405: Murong De
  - 405–410: Murong Chao
- History
  - Established: 398
  - Capturing of Guanggu: 399
  - Disestablished: 410
Preceded by	Succeeded by
Later Yan	Jin Dynasty (266–420)
- Today part of: China

Yan, known in historiography as the Southern Yan (Chinese: 南燕; pinyin: Nán Yān; 398–410), was a dynastic state of China ruled by the Murong clan of the Xianbei during the era of Sixteen Kingdoms. Its founder Murong De (Emperor Xianwu) was a son of Murong Huang (Emperor Wenming) and brother of Murong Jun (Emperor Jingzhao) and Murong Chui (Emperor Chengwu), and therefore was an imperial prince of both the Former Yan and Later Yan dynasties.

All rulers of the Southern Yan declared themselves "emperors". Initially ruling from Huatai (滑台, in modern Anyang, Henan) in northern Henan, they later moved to Shandong and established Guanggu (廣固, in modern Qingzhou, Shandong) as their capital. As one of many Yan states from the period, they were given the prefix of "Southern" by historiographers to distinguish them with the others as they were based south of the Yellow River.

== History ==
=== Background ===
Murong De was the son of Murong Huang, the founder of the Former Yan dynasty. He was an accomplished military general for the Former Yan, then the Di-led Former Qin after they conquered Yan in 370, and finally the Later Yan, a restoration of the Former Yan founded by his brother, Murong Chui. Under Later Yan, De was trusted by Chui as a key advisor in his administration, and after Chui's son, Murong Bao, ascended the throne in 396, he was made to overlook the southern empire from Ye.

However, soon after Bao's succession, the Northern Wei launched a large-scale invasion of Later Yan. The Central Plains was quickly overran by Wei, and Murong Bao was forced to abandon his capital, Zhongshan (中山, in modern Baoding, Hebei) and evacuate to Longcheng in Liaoning. Initially, Murong De held firmly to Ye and parts of the south, but at the advice of his nephew, Murong Lin, who previously declared himself emperor at Zhongshan but fled to Ye as Wei captured the city, he decided to abdondon Ye for Huatai (滑台, in modern Anyang, Henan) in 398. In the same year he forced Murong Lin, who was discovered of plot against him, to commit suicide.

=== Reign of Murong De ===
At Huatai, Murong De took the title of Prince of Yan, thus splitting the Yan into two. Historiographers distinguish Murong De's state with the other Yan states as the Southern Yan. De nearly captured and killed Murong Bao when the latter came to Huatai, unaware that his uncle had declared independence, but Bao managed to escape back north.

In 399, disorder broke out in Southern Yan when Fu Guang (苻廣), a remnant of the Fu clan of Former Qin, rebelled in an attempt to restore his state. Murong De campaigned against and defeated him, but while he was away, a traitor opened the gates of Huatai to Northern Wei forces, leaving Murong De stranded without any territory. He decided to attack Qing Province of the Eastern Jin dynasty, which corresponds to modern central and eastern Shandong. He took the province with ease, establishing the city of Guanggu (廣固, in modern Qingzhou, Shandong) as his new capital. In 400, he elevated his title to Emperor of Yan and changed his name to Murong Beide.

For the rest of Murong Beide's reign, Southern Yan was peaceful and prosperous to live in. As Yan had a much smaller population compared to the neighbouring Wei and Jin, Beide enacted policies to encourage manpower movement such as corvee exemptions while also rectifying the household registry. At the time, Jin was in turmoil due to Huan Xuan's rebellion, and Southern Yan welcomed a number of Jin exiles into their territory. Murong De also planned to take advantage of the situation in Jin by launching an invasion, but became ill and died in 405.

=== Reign of Murong Chao ===
Murong De did not have any living sons prior to his death, the throne was passed on to his nephew, Murong Chao. Chao had previously been a beggar in Later Qin and was almost immediately made heir when he arrived at Guanggu in 405. Records accuse Chao of initially having great potential, but turning cruel and capricious upon becoming emperor. During his reign, Chao purged his uncle's retainers like Murong Zhong while elevating his own confidants, particularly Gongsun Wulou, to power, which brought the government into disarray. In 407, wanting to retrieve his mother and wife who were still in Later Qin, Chao agreed to become a vassal and give up his court musicians in return for their safe passage to Southern Yan.

In 409, Murong Chao attacked the Jin for prisoners to be trained as new musicians. This prompted an invasion of Southern Yan by the Jin general Liu Yu. Liu Yu defeated the Southern Yan army at the Battle of Linqu and then besieged Guanggu. The Later Qin, held down by their war with the Helian Xia, was unable to send reinforcements to Southern Yan, and Liu Yu eventually took Guanggu in 410. Murong Chao was captured and executed and Southern Yan was annexed by Jin.

== Rulers of the Southern Yan ==
Temple name	Posthumous name	Personal name	Durations of reign	Era names
Shizong	Xianwu	Murong De	398–405	Yanwang (燕王) 398–400; Jianxing (建平) 400–405
–		Murong Chao	405–410	Taishang (太上) 405–410

== See also ==
- Xianbei
- List of past Chinese ethnic groups
- Wu Hu
- Emperor Wu of Liu Song
