= Later Yan =

Dynastic state in Northeast China (384-409 CE)

Yan 燕
- 384–409
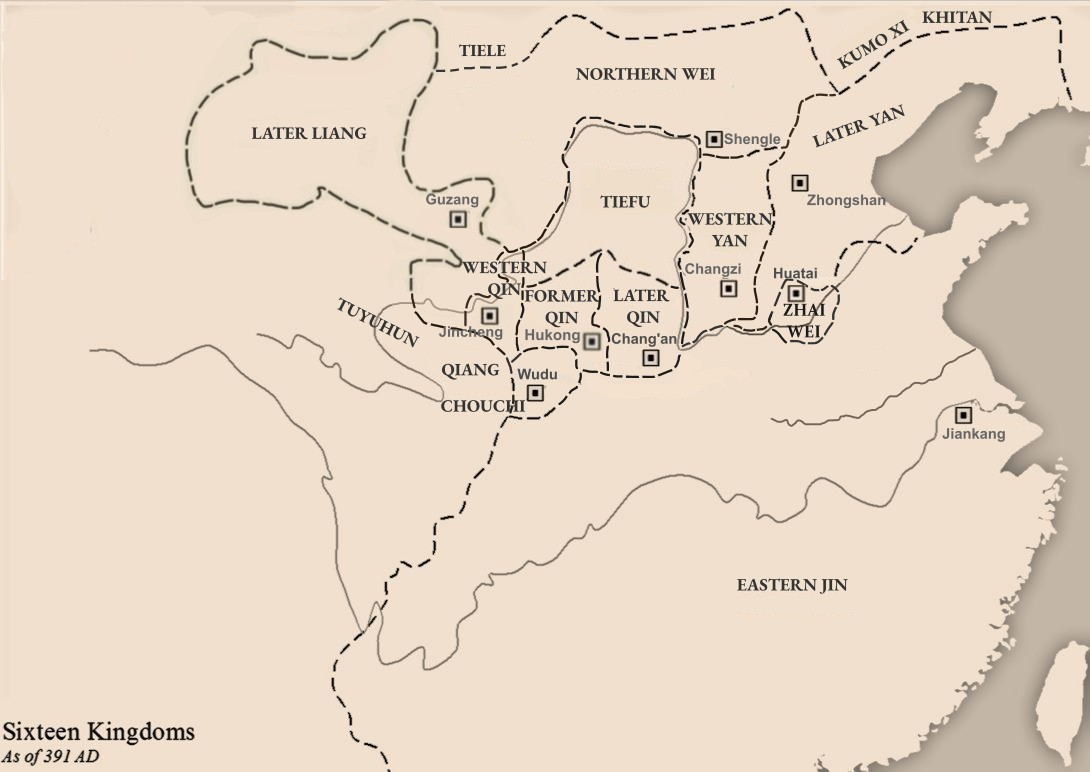
- Later Yan in 391 AD

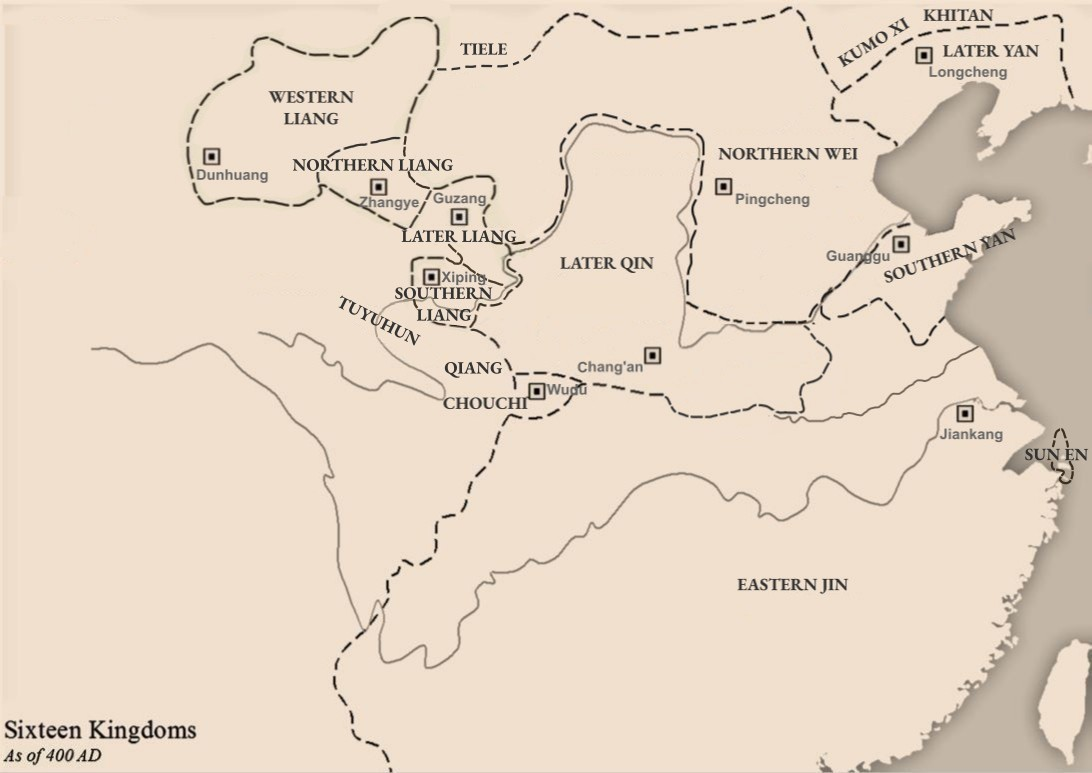
- Later Yan in 400 AD
- Capital: Zhongshan (386–397); Longcheng (397–409)
- Government: Monarchy
- Emperor
  - 384–396: Murong Chui
  - 396–398: Murong Bao
  - 398: Lan Han
  - 398–401: Murong Sheng
  - 401–407: Murong Xi
  - 407–409: Murong Yun
- History
  - Established: 384
  - Establishment of Zhongshan as capital: 8 February 386
  - Murong Chui's claim of imperial title: 15 February 386
  - Evacuation of Zhongshan: 27 April 397
  - Murong Xi's death: 16 September 407
  - Disestablished: 6 November 409
Preceded by
Former Qin
Succeeded by
Northern Wei
Southern Yan
Northern Yan
- Today part of: China

Yan, known in historiography as the Later Yan (simplified Chinese: 后燕; traditional Chinese: 後燕; pinyin: Hòu Yān; 384 – 407 or 409), was a dynastic state of China ruled by the Xianbei people during the era of Sixteen Kingdoms.

The prefix "Later" to distinguish them from the Former Yan before them and other Yan states from the period. Historiographers also consider the Former Yan and Later Yan as separate states despite both being ruled by the same imperial family, and the Later Yan's founder, Murong Chui, had intended his state to be a restoration. Due to the devastation inflicted on the old Yan capital, Ye, the city of Zhongshan (中山, in modern Baoding, Hebei) became the first capital of the Later Yan. The Later Yan managed to recover most of their old territory in Liaoning, Hebei, Shaanxi, Shandong and Henan by 394. However, after the Northern Wei invasion in 396, they were reduced to Liaoning and parts of northeastern Hebei, where they made Longcheng their new capital. Their territory was further reduced during their war with Goguryeo as they lost the Liaodong Peninsula.

The Later Yan rulers initially declared themselves "emperors", but towards the end they adopted the lesser title of "Tiān Wáng" (Heavenly King). Some historians consider Murong Xi the last ruler of Later Yan, while others consider it to be Gao Yun, an adopted member of the imperial family of Goguryeo ethnicity.

== History ==
=== Background ===
Murong Chui was the son of Murong Huang, the founder of the Xianbei Former Yan dynasty, and a key military general; in 369, he saved the state from ruin by defeating an Eastern Jin invasion led by Huan Wen at the Battle of Fangtou. On the other hand, he was also a subject of suspicion within the imperial family. After defeating Huan Wen, the regent, his uncle Murong Ping became apprehensive of his newfound reputation and wanted to kill him, prompting Chui to flee to the Di-led Former Qin dynasty.

In the next few years, Qin conquered Yan and reunified northern China. Although Qin's ruler, Fu Jian treated him favourably, Chui harboured ambitions to restore his state. He fought for Qin in campaigns against the Eastern Jin and was one of the few officials who supported the ill-fated invasion of 383, which saw the Qin's disastrous defeat at the Battle of Fei River. As Chui's army remained mostly intact after the battle, he escorted the injured Fu Jian back to the north.

Sensing weakness, Chui began carrying out his restoration, but rather than kill Fu Jian, he requested to be transferred to Hebei, where Former Yan once ruled, ostensibly to maintain order in the region. There, he cooperated with Fu Jian's son, Fu Pi, under mutual suspicion while secretly contacting the old Yan families and officials to join his movement. In 384, the Dingling people led by Zhai Bin rebelled around Luoyang. Fu Pi sent Chui to attack them, but during the campaign, Chui finally rebelled, joining forces with Zhai Bin.

=== Restoring the Yan ===
Initially, Murong Chui only took the title of Prince of Yan, as the last Former Yan emperor, Murong Wei, was still alive at the Qin capital, Chang'an. To distinguish between Former Yan and other Yan states of the period, historiographers refer to Chui's state as the Later Yan. He led his forces to besiege Fu Pi at Ye while his generals secured the rest of Hebei. Unlike the Former Yan dynasty, the upper echelons of the Later Yan were dominated by the Xianbei, Wuhuan, Dingling and other non-Chinese clans rather than Han Chinese. The Later Yan also had to cooperate with the various fortified settlements (塢堡; wubao) in the northeast.

Soon after Chui's rebellion, the Western Yan and Later Qin also broke away around Chang'an, constraining Fu Jian and preventing him from sending aid to the east. Despite rebelling, Chui upheld a framing of still being indebted to Fu Jian. While besieging Ye, he attempted to assure Fu Pi's safety and allowed him an escape route to the west. Members of the Fu clan that surrendered were also welcomed and allowed to serve under him.

The battle for Ye lasted around a year as Fu Pi held firmly to the city. During this time, the Zhai-Dingling rebelled and Chui had to fight a brief alliance between Qin and Jin. The war in Hebei and famines that accompanied it devastated the region's economy, but Fu Pi finally abandoned Ye for Jinyang in late 385. Later Yan captured the city, and at this point had occupied most of Hebei.

=== Wars with Zhai Wei and Western Yan ===
In 386, Murong Chui made Zhongshan (中山, in modern Baoding, Hebei) his capital, as the city underwent significant development during the war. Later that year, his cousin, Murong Yong of Western Yan occupied Shanxi and declared himself emperor. By now, both Murong Wei and Fu Jian had died, so Chui also changed his title to emperor. The Dingling rebels under Zhai Liao founded the Zhai Wei state at Huatai (滑台, in modern Anyang, Henan) in 388. Rebellions frequently broke out in Yan territory, and the Yan was in a constant state of warfare.

In 392, Murong Chui campaigned against and destroyed Zhai Wei. In 394, seeking to establish Later Yan as Former Yan's true successor, Chui began a campaign to conquer Western Yan. He captured the Western Yan capital and executed Murong Yong, annexing Shanxi for Later Yan. Then, he sent his generals to capture Shandong from the Eastern Jin dynasty, bringing the state to its peak.

At this point, Murong Chui was already at an advanced age, and so he began empowering his Crown Prince, Murong Bao. In 388, he assigned Bao to run the government from Zhongshan while still retaining his decision-making power on important matters. Chui also introduced a separate governing system between his Han Chinese and "Hu" subjects within Yan by appointing Bao the Grand Chanyu, tasked with supervising the tribes. This system was further developed during the reign of Murong Sheng, who established the Yan Ministry to manage the tribes, and then Murong Xi, who set up the Grand Chanyu Administration.

=== War with Northern Wei ===
Previously in 386, to counter Western Yan, Later Yan allied themselves with the Tuoba-Xianbei state of Northern Wei. Initially, Wei relied on Later Yan's assistance against their rival tribes, but an incident in 391 led to relations breaking down. Wei aligned themselves with Western Yan, and hostilities continued even after Western Yan fell. In 395, to further elevate his Crown Prince, he sent Murong Bao to lead a force of around 90,000 strong on a punitive expedition against Wei, but the campaign ended in disaster as the Yan was heavily routed at the Battle of Canhe Slope, with Bao barely escaping with his life. In 396, Murong Chui personally led a campaign against Wei, but despite early success, became extremely ill and was forced to withdraw. He soon died and was succeeded by Murong Bao.

Bao's rule was immediately troubled by conflict between him and his family members, along with his sudden and unpopular attempt at rectifying the state's household registry. Shortly after Bao's ascension, the Wei ruler, Tuoba Gui invaded Yan. Bao concentrated his forces to Zhongshan and other major cities, believing that Wei would besiege them and withdraw once their supply ran out. Instead, Wei forces quickly overran the Central Plains and consolidated their rule over captured territory. When a rebellion broke out near the Wei capital, Gui negotiated peace, but Bao refused to accept it. He attacked the Wei army as they prepare to retreat, but the Yan army was severely defeated at the Battle of Baisi.

After the loss at Baisi, Bao's brother, Murong Lin started a coup in Zhongshan but failed and escaped the city. Worried that Lin may occupy the key city of Longcheng, Bao decided to abandon Zhongshan for Longcheng. Hereafter, more infighting ensued; at Longcheng, Bao survived rebellions by his son, Murong Hui and his general Duan Sugu (段速骨). Meanwhile, at Zhongshan, a cousin, Murong Xiang held out against Wei and declared himself emperor, but was soon killed and replaced by Murong Lin. However, Zhongshan then fell to Wei, and Lin fled to Ye, where he convinced his uncle, Murong De to abandon the city for Huatai. There, De declared himself the Prince of Yan in 398, founding the Southern Yan and splitting the state into two.

=== Rule from Liaoning ===
Supplanted by the Northern Wei, the Later Yan ceased to be a major player on the Central Plains as their territory was reduced to present-day Liaoning. In 398, Murong Bao was assassinated by his granduncle, Lan Han, who was then killed by Bao's son, Murong Sheng, shortly after. Sheng demoted his imperial title from Emperor to Commoner Heavenly King in 400. He had success in waging war against the Kumo Xi and Goguryeo but was also very strict and suspicious of his own officials. In 401, he was killed during a coup, and his uncle Murong Xi replaced him as Heavenly King.

Murong Xi is described in records as a remarkably cruel and wasteful ruler, acting on the whims of his lovers, the sisters Fu Song'e and Fu Xunying. Xi engaged in several costly construction projects and launched repeated campaigns against the Khitan and Goguryeo. However, he was largely unsuccessful in his campaigns, even losing Liaodong to Goguryeo in 404. Taking advantage of Fu Xunying's funeral in 407, Murong Bao's adopted son, Murong Yun, launched a coup and killed Murong Xi.

Murong Yun was originally named Gao Yun and a descendant of the Goguryeo royal family. Upon ascending, he changed his name back to Gao Yun. Depending on one's interpretation, he was either the last ruler of Later Yan or the first ruler of a separate regime known as the Northern Yan (hence, Later Yan ending with Murong Xi's death in 407). Gao Yun established friendly relations with Goguryeo before he was assassinated in 409. His Han Chinese general, Feng Ba replaced him on the throne, thus ending the Later Yan and beginning the Northern Yan.

== Rulers of the Later Yan ==
Temple names	Posthumous names	Family names and given name	Durations of reigns	Era names and their according durations
Shizu (世祖)	Chengwu (成武)	Murong Chui	384–396	Yanwang (燕王) 384–386; Jianxing (建興) 386–396
Liezong (烈宗)	Huimin (惠愍)	Murong Bao	396–398	Yongkang (永康) 396–398
–	–	Lan Han	398	Qinglong (青龍/青龙) 398
Zhongzong (中宗)	Zhaowu (昭武)	Murong Sheng	398–401	Jianping (建平) 398; Changle (長樂) 399–401
–	Zhaowen (昭文)	Murong Xi	401–407	Guangshi (光始) 401–406; Jianshi (建始) 407
–	Huiyi (惠懿)	Murong Yun^{1} or Gao Yun^{1}	407–409	Zhengshi (正始) 407–409
1 The family name of Gao Yun was changed to Murong when he was adopted by the royal family. If Gao Yun was counted as a ruler of the Later Yan, the state would end in 409. It ended in 407 otherwise.

== See also ==
- Battle of Canhebei
- Wu Hu
- List of past Chinese ethnic groups
- Xianbei
