= Sixteen Kingdoms =

Period of Chinese history from 304 to 439

- Traditional Chinese: 十六國
- Simplified Chinese: 十六国
Transcriptions
Standard Mandarin
- Hanyu Pinyin: Shíliù Guó
- Bopomofo: ㄕˊ ㄌㄧㄡˋ ㄍㄨㄛˊ
- Wade–Giles: Shih^{2}-liu^{4} Kuo^{2}
- Tongyong Pinyin: Shíh-liòu Guó
- IPA: [ʂɻ̩̌.ljôʊ kwǒ]
Wu
- Romanization: ^{8}Zeq-loq ^{7}Koq
Xiang
- IPA: ʂʐ̩²⁴ ləu̯²⁴ ku̯ɤ̞²⁴
Hakka
- Pha̍k-fa-sṳ: Sṳ̍p-liuk Koet
Yue: Cantonese
- Yale Romanization: Sahpluhk Gwok
- Jyutping: Sap^{6} Luk^{6} Gwok^{3}
- IPA: [sɐp̚˨.lʊk̚˨ kʷɔk̚˧]
Southern Min
- Hokkien POJ: Cha̍p-la̍k Kok
- Teochew Peng'im: Zab^{8}-lag^{8} Gog^{4}
Eastern Min
- Fuzhou BUC: Sĕk-lĕ̤k Guók
Northern Min
- Jian'ou Romanized: Sí-lṳ̀ Gŏ

The Sixteen Kingdoms (simplified Chinese: 十六国; traditional Chinese: 十六國; pinyin: Shíliù Guó), less commonly the Sixteen States, was a period in Chinese history from AD 304 to 439 when the political order of the Jin dynasty (266–420) in northern China fragmented into a series of short-lived dynastic states. Most of these states were founded by the "Five Barbarians" – Xiongnu, Xianbei, Di, Jie, Qiang – non-Han peoples from northern and western China who launched the rebellions that toppled the Jin court in Luoyang in 311 and Chang'an (modern-day Xi'an) in 316, ending the Western Jin dynasty (266–316). Some of these peoples, notably the Xiongnu of Shanxi and the Di of Guanzhong, had lived in China for generations and were highly sinicized. Others such as the Tuoba and Murong Xianbei tribes migrated from China's periphery into Central Plains in the ensuing decades to compete for political supremacy over northern China. All of these states took on Han-style dynastic names and most claimed as having the Mandate of Heaven to rule all of China. They frequently fought against one another and the Jin, which continued to rule southern China from Jiankang (modern-day Nanjing) as the Eastern Jin dynasty (317-420).

Due to fierce competition among the states and internal political instability, the kingdoms of this era were mostly short-lived. For seven years from 376 to 383, the Former Qin unified all of northern and northwest China and Sichuan. The Former Qin's quest to conquer southern China was stopped by the Eastern Jin at the Battle of Fei River (in modern-day central Anhui), after which the Former Qin splintered and northern China experienced even greater political fragmentation, with as many as nine states co-existing in the north in 400. This period ended with the unification of northern China in 439 by the Northern Wei, a dynasty established by the Xianbei Tuoba clan, and the history of northern China entered the Northern Dynasties period.

The Sixteen Kingdoms marked the first time in the imperial era of Chinese history that non-Han rulers governed a vast portion of the Chinese heartland and ruled as Emperor of China. Each of the northern kingdoms, regardless of the ethnicity of its founders and rulers, was multi-ethnic in character, and their rulers were sinicized to varying degrees, adopting a diversity of approaches to governance that drew on different mixes of Han and non-Han institutions and customs. The challenges that these rulers confronted — how to govern both Han and non-Han peoples, the degree to which they should adopt Chinese culture, and how in doing so they redefined what it meant to be Chinese — would persist through the subsequent Northern and Southern dynasties period, from which emerged the Sui and Tang dynasties with their more inclusive governance, multi-ethnic character and cosmopolitan culture.

The fall of the Western Jin dynasty amidst the rise of non-Han regimes in northern China during the Sixteen Kingdoms period resembles the fall of the Western Roman Empire amidst invasions by the Huns and Germanic tribes in Europe, which also occurred in the 4th to 5th centuries. While the division of Roman empire in 395 AD became permanent, China was able to reunify by integrating the barbarians from the Sixteen Kingdoms era into government and society. The broader dynamic of non-Chinese rulers adapting their rule to China would recur with the Liao, Jin (1115–1234), Yuan and Qing dynasties and continue to shape Chinese history into the early 20th century.

== Period name and constituent kingdoms ==
The term "Sixteen Kingdoms" was first used by the 6th-century historian Cui Hong in the Spring and Autumn Annals of the Sixteen Kingdoms, a compilation of available records from the states that appeared during the period. These were the five Liangs (Former, Later, Northern, Southern and Western), four Yans (Former, Later, Northern, and Southern), three Qins (Former, Later and Western), two Zhaos (Han/Former and Later), Cheng-Han and Xia.

Several other states from this period Cui Hong did not include Duan Qi, Western Yan, Ran Wei, Zhai Wei, Chouchi, and Tuyuhun. Nor did he include the Dai whose successor the Northern Wei, unified northern China and became the first of the Northern dynasties. The history of the Dai and Northern Wei is found in a later record, the Book of Wei.

Also excluded from the historiography are the short-lived regimes that broke away from the Eastern Jin after the dynasty was reconstituted in southern China. Regimes such as Huan Chu and Qiao Shu emerged from political turmoil within the Eastern Jin court.

=== The Sixteen Kingdoms ===
#	Regime Name (Note: The directional prefixes (Former, Later, Northern, Southern, Western) are retroactive historiographical labels used to distinguish kingdoms that shared the same dynastic name. Each kingdom simply called itself by the dynastic name alone (e.g. "Yan", "Qin", "Liang") during its existence.)	Period	Dur. (yrs)	Ethnicity of Rulers	Founder	Capital(s)	Ended by	Location	Other Rulers
1	Cheng-Han (Note: The state was originally named "Cheng" (成) or "Dacheng" (大成, "Great Cheng") by its founder Li Xiong in 304. In 338, Li Shou seized the throne from Li Xiong's line and renamed the state "Han" (漢) to distance himself from his predecessors and invoke the prestige of the Han dynasty. Historiographers combine the two periods under the label "Cheng-Han" (成漢). Cheng-Han was the earliest established of the Sixteen Kingdoms.) 成→漢	304–347 (Note: Li Te declared a new era name in 303, which some scholars consider the founding act. The more commonly accepted founding year is 304, when Li Xiong claimed the title of King of Chengdu.)	43	Di (Ba)	Li Xiong 李雄; Temple: Taizong 太宗; Posthumous: Emperor Wu 武帝	Chengdu (304–347) (Chengdu, Sichuan)	Eastern Jin (under Huan Wen)	Modern Sichuan and Chongqing in southwestern China; the only Sixteen Kingdom based in the southwest	Li Te 李特 (303) (Note: Li Te is sometimes counted as the de facto first ruler, but he never claimed a royal or imperial title. He died in battle in 303 before the state was formally proclaimed.); Li Liu 李流 (303); Li Ban 李班 (334, ~5 months); Li Qi 李期 (334–338); Li Shou 李壽 (338–343); Li Shi 李勢 (343–347)
2	Han (Former Zhao) (Note: Liu Yuan founded the state in 304 as "Han" (漢), invoking a claimed descent from the Han dynasty through a marriage between Modu Chanyu and a Han princess. In 319, after Jin Zhun's coup devastated the imperial Liu clan, Liu Yao moved the capital to Chang'an, renounced the Han lineage, and renamed the state "Zhao" (趙), tracing legitimacy to Modu Chanyu. He chose "Zhao" because his earlier title was Prince of Zhongshan, which lay in the territory of the ancient State of Zhao. Because Shi Le also named his breakaway state "Zhao" the same year, historians later distinguished the two as "Former Zhao" (前趙) and "Later Zhao" (後趙).) 漢→趙 / 前趙	304–329 (Note: Liu Yuan declared independence from the Western Jin and proclaimed himself Prince of Han in 304. The state is sometimes dated from 308, when Liu Yuan claimed the imperial title.)	25	Xiongnu (Five Divisions)	Liu Yuan 劉淵; Temple: Gaozu 高祖; Posthumous: Emperor Guangwen 光文帝	Lishi (304–308) (Lishi, Lüliang, Shanxi); Puzi (308–309) (Xiangning, Linfen, Shanxi); Pingyang (309–319) (Linfen, Shanxi); Chang'an (319–329) (Xi'an, Shaanxi)	Later Zhao	Modern Shanxi, Shaanxi, and parts of Henan and Gansu in north-central China	Liu He 劉和 (310, 7 days); Liu Cong 劉聰 (310–318); Liu Can 劉粲 (318, ~1 month); Liu Yao 劉曜 (318–329); Liu Xi 劉熙 (329, months)
3	Zhao (Later) 後趙	319–351	32	Jie	Shi Le 石勒; Temple: Gaozu 高祖; Posthumous: Emperor Ming 明帝	Xiangguo (319–335) (Xingtai, Hebei); Ye (335–351) (Linzhang, Handan, Hebei)	Ran Wei	Most of northern China including modern Hebei, Henan, Shandong, Shanxi, Shaanxi, and parts of Anhui, Jiangsu, Liaoning, and Gansu	Shi Hong 石弘 (333–334); Shi Hu 石虎 (334–349); Shi Shi 石世 (349, 33 days); Shi Zun 石遵 (349, ~183 days); Shi Jian 石鑒 (349–350, ~103 days); Shi Zhi 石祗 (350–351)
4	Liang (Former) 前涼	301–376 (Note: Zhang Gui was appointed governor of Liangzhou by the Western Jin in 301. After the fall of the Western Jin in 316, the Zhang family continued to use Emperor Min's Jianxing (建興) era name rather than adopting Eastern Jin era names, marking their de facto independence by 317. In 323, Zhang Mao accepted the title "Prince of Liang" (涼王) from the Former Zhao, acknowledging its suzerainty. After Former Zhao's fall in 329, the Former Liang reverted to nominal Eastern Jin allegiance. In 345, Zhang Jun self-styled as "Acting Prince of Liang" (假涼王) and established a full independent bureaucracy. In 354–355, Zhang Zuo briefly claimed the imperial title, the only Former Liang ruler to do so.)	75	Han Chinese	Zhang Gui 張軌; Posthumous: Duke Wu 武公	Guzang (301–376) (Wuwei, Gansu)	Former Qin	Modern Gansu and parts of Ningxia and Xinjiang in northwestern China; extended influence into the Western Regions	Zhang Shi 張寔 (314–320); Zhang Mao 張茂 (320–324); Zhang Jun 張駿 (324–346); Zhang Chonghua 張重華 (346–353); Zhang Yaoling 張曜靈 (353, deposed); Zhang Zuo 張祚 (353–355); Zhang Xuanjing 張玄靚 (355–363); Zhang Tianxi 張天錫 (363–376)
5	Yan (Former) 前燕	337–370	33	Xianbei (Murong)	Murong Huang 慕容皝; Temple: Taizu 太祖; Posthumous: Emperor Wenming 文明帝	Longcheng (337–350) (Chaoyang, Liaoning); Ji (350–357) (Beijing); Ye (357–370) (Linzhang, Handan, Hebei)	Former Qin	Modern Liaoning, Hebei, Shandong, Henan, and Shanxi in northeastern and north-central China	Murong Jun 慕容儁 (348–360); Murong Wei 慕容暐 (360–370)
6	Qin (Former) 前秦	351–394	43	Di (Lüeyang)	Fu Jiàn 苻健; Temple: Shizu 世祖; Posthumous: Emperor Jingming 景明帝	Chang'an (351–385) (Xi'an, Shaanxi); Jinyang (385–386) (Taiyuan, Shanxi); Nan'an (386–394) (near Longxi, Gansu); Huangzhong (394) (Ledu, Haidong, Qinghai)	Later Qin / Western Qin	At its peak (376–383), all of northern China from modern Liaoning to Xinjiang and south into Sichuan; the only Sixteen Kingdom to unify the entire north	Fu Sheng 苻生 (355–357); Fu Jiān 苻堅 (357–385); Fu Pi 苻丕 (385–386); Fu Deng 苻登 (386–394); Fu Chong 苻崇 (394, months)
7	Yan (Later) 後燕	384–409	25	Xianbei (Murong)	Murong Chui 慕容垂; Temple: Shizu 世祖; Posthumous: Emperor Chengwu 成武帝	Zhongshan (384–397) (Dingzhou, Hebei); Longcheng (397–409) (Chaoyang, Liaoning)	Northern Yan (Note: The Later Yan ended through an internal coup: Gao Yun, a Murong adoptee of Goguryeo descent, overthrew the last Murong ruler in 407 and founded the Northern Yan.)	Modern Hebei, Liaoning, Shandong, and Henan in northeastern China; after 397, reduced to Liaoning	Murong Bao 慕容寶 (396–398); Lan Han 蘭汗 (398, usurper, ~3 months); Murong Sheng 慕容盛 (398–401); Murong Xi 慕容熙 (401–407)
8	Qin (Later) 後秦	384–417	33	Qiang (Shaodang)	Yao Chang 姚萇; Temple: Taizu 太祖; Posthumous: Emperor Wuzhao 武昭帝	Chang'an (386–417) (Note: Yao Chang initially based himself at Beidi (Yaoxian, Shaanxi) from 384 before capturing Chang'an in 386 and making it his capital.) (Xi'an, Shaanxi)	Eastern Jin (under Liu Yu)	Modern Shaanxi, Henan, Gansu, and parts of Sichuan in central and northwestern China	Yao Xing 姚興 (394–416); Yao Hong 姚泓 (416–417)
9	Qin (Western) 西秦	385–400; 409–431 (Note: The Western Qin was conquered by the Later Qin in 400, ending its first period. It was reestablished by Qifu Chipan in 409 after the Later Qin weakened.)	37	Xianbei (Qifu)	Qifu Guoren 乞伏國仁; Posthumous: Prince Xuanlie 宣烈王	Yongcheng (385–388) (near Lanzhou, Gansu); Jincheng (388–395) (Lanzhou, Gansu); Yuanchuan (395–400) (near Linxia, Gansu); Dujianshan (409–412) (near Lintan, Gansu); Tanjiao (412–414) (near Linxia, Gansu); Fuhan (414–430) (near Linxia, Gansu); Nan'an (430–431) (near Longxi, Gansu)	Xia	Modern eastern Gansu and southeastern Qinghai in northwestern China	Qifu Gangui 乞伏乾歸 (388–400; 409–412); Qifu Chipan 乞伏熾磐 (412–428); Qifu Mumo 乞伏暮末 (428–431)
10	Liang (Later) 後涼	386–403	17	Di (Lüeyang)	Lü Guang 呂光; Posthumous: Yiwu 懿武 (Heavenly King)	Guzang (386–403) (Wuwei, Gansu)	Later Qin	Modern central Gansu in northwestern China; centred on the Hexi Corridor	Lü Shao 呂紹 (399, days); Lü Zuan 呂纂 (399–401); Lü Long 呂隆 (401–403)
11	Liang (Southern) 南涼	397–414	17	Xianbei (Tufa)	Tufa Wugu 禿髮烏孤; Posthumous: Prince Wu 武王	Lianchuan (397–399) (near Hualong, Qinghai); Ledu (399–402) (Ledu, Haidong, Qinghai); Xiping (402–406) (Xining, Qinghai); Guzang (406–410) (Wuwei, Gansu); Ledu (410–414) (Ledu, Haidong, Qinghai)	Western Qin	Modern eastern Qinghai and central Gansu in northwestern China	Tufa Lilugu 禿髮利鹿孤 (399–402); Tufa Rutan 禿髮傉檀 (402–414)
12	Liang (Northern) 北涼	397–439 (Note: After the Northern Wei conquered the Northern Liang in 439, Juqu Wuhui and other members of the Juqu clan fled west and established a rump state at Gaochang (near modern Turpan, Xinjiang), known as the Northern Liang of Gaochang (442–460). This remnant was eventually destroyed by the Rouran Khaganate in 460.)	42	Han Chinese (Note: The Northern Liang was founded by the Han Chinese Duan Ye with the support of the Lushuihu Xiongnu chieftain Juqu Mengxun. In 401, Juqu Mengxun deposed and killed Duan Ye and seized control of the kingdom. From 401 onward, the ruling house was Xiongnu (Lushuihu).)/Xiongnu (Lushuihu)	Duan Ye 段業 (founder, titular); Deposed by: Juqu Mengxun 沮渠蒙遜; Temple: Taizu 太祖; Posthumous: Prince Wuxuan 武宣王	Zhangye (397–439) (Zhangye, Gansu)	Northern Wei	Modern central and western Gansu in northwestern China; the last of the Sixteen Kingdoms to fall	Juqu Mujian 沮渠牧犍 (433–439)
13	Yan (Southern) 南燕	398–410	12	Xianbei (Murong)	Murong De 慕容德; Temple: Shizong 世宗; Posthumous: Emperor Xianwu 獻武帝	Huatai (398–399) (near Cao, Heze, Shandong); Guanggu (399–410) (Qingzhou, Weifang, Shandong)	Eastern Jin (under Liu Yu)	Modern Shandong province in eastern China	Murong Chao 慕容超 (405–410)
14	Liang (Western) 西涼	400–421	21	Han Chinese	Li Gao 李暠; Temple: Taizu 太祖; Posthumous: Prince Wuzhao 武昭王	Dunhuang (400–405) (Dunhuang, Gansu); Jiuquan (405–421) (Jiuquan, Gansu)	Northern Liang	Modern western Gansu in northwestern China; centred on the western end of the Hexi Corridor	Li Xin 李歆 (417–420); Li Xun 李恂 (420–421)
15	Yan (Northern) 北燕	407–436	29	Goguryeo (Note: The Northern Yan was founded by Gao Yun, who was of Goguryeo descent but had been adopted into the Murong clan. After his assassination in 409, the throne passed to Feng Ba, who was Han Chinese. The ruling Feng family remained Han Chinese for the rest of the kingdom's existence.) / Han Chinese	Gao Yun 高雲; Posthumous: Emperor Huiyi 惠懿帝	Longcheng (407–436) (Chaoyang, Liaoning)	Northern Wei	Modern western Liaoning in northeastern China	Feng Ba 馮跋 (409–430); Feng Hong 馮弘 (430–436)
16	Xia 夏	407–431	24	Xiongnu (Tiefu)	Helian Bobo 赫連勃勃; Temple: Shizu 世祖; Posthumous: Emperor Wulie 武烈帝	Tongwancheng (407–428) (Jingbian, Yulin, Shaanxi); Shanggui (428–431) (Tianshui, Gansu)	Northern Wei	Modern northern Shaanxi, Ordos Plateau in Inner Mongolia, and later parts of Gansu in north-central China	Helian Chang 赫連昌 (425–428); Helian Ding 赫連定 (428–431)

=== Other breakaway regimes of the period ===
	Regime Name	Period	Dur. (yrs)	Ethnicity of Rulers	Founder	Capital(s)	Ended by	Location	Other Rulers
1	Dai 代	310–376	66	Xianbei (Tuoba)	Tuoba Yilu 拓跋猗盧; Posthumous: Emperor Mu 穆帝	Shengle (310–376) (Horinger, Hohhot, Inner Mongolia)	Former Qin (Note: Dai was later revived in 386 by Tuoba Gui as the Northern Wei, which went on to reunify all of northern China by 439. The Northern Wei is not counted among the Sixteen Kingdoms because it was still in power when the historian Cui Hong compiled his annals.)	Modern central Inner Mongolia and northern Shanxi.	Tuoba Pugen 拓跋普根 (316); Tuoba Yulü 拓跋鬱律 (316–321); Tuoba Heru 拓跋賀傉 (321–325); Tuoba Hena 拓跋紇那 (325–329; 335–337); Tuoba Yihuai 拓跋翳槐 (329–335; 337–338); Tuoba Shiyijian 拓跋什翼犍 (338–376)
2	Wei (Ran) 冉魏	350–352	2	Han Chinese	Ran Min 冉閔; Posthumous: Wudao Heavenly King 武悼天王	Ye (350–352) (Linzhang, Handan, Hebei)	Former Yan	Modern southern Hebei and northern Henan province	—
3	Yan (Western) 西燕	384–394	10	Xianbei (Murong)	Murong Hong 慕容泓; Posthumous: Prince Wei 威王 (Note: The Western Yan experienced extreme political instability, with seven rulers in its first two years. Murong Yong (386–394) was the only ruler to hold power for an extended period.)	Chang'an (384–386) (Xi'an, Shaanxi); Various (386–389); Changzi (389–394) (Changzi, Changzhi, Shanxi)	Later Yan	Shanxi province	Murong Chong 慕容沖 (384–386); Duan Sui 段隨 (386, days); Murong Yi 慕容顗 (386, ~1 month); Murong Yao 慕容瑤 (386, days); Murong Zhong 慕容忠 (386); Murong Yong 慕容永 (386–394)
4	Wei (Zhai) 翟魏	388–392	4	Dingling	Zhai Liao 翟遼	Huatai (388–392) (near Hua, Anyang, Henan)	Later Yan	Modern northeastern Henan and southwestern Shandong in eastern China	Zhai Zhao 翟釗 (391–392)
5	Chouchi 仇池	296–371; 385–443 (Note: Chouchi had multiple periods of existence with interruptions. The first Chouchi polity (296–371) was destroyed by the Former Qin. It was restored in 385 during the Former Qin's collapse and continued in various forms until the 6th century, well beyond the conventional end of the Sixteen Kingdoms period.)	inter- mittent	Di (Baiqing)	Yang Maosou 楊茂搜	Chouchi (296–443) (near Xihe, Longnan, Gansu)	Northern Wei / Liu Song	Modern southern Gansu and northwestern Sichuan; a mountainous area between Guanzhong and Sichuan Basin	Numerous successors of the Yang clan across multiple periods
6	Qi (Duan) (Note: Historians add the founder's clan name "Duan" to distinguish this short-lived regime, which called itself simply "Qi" (齊), from other states of the same name.) 段齊	350–356	6	Xianbei (Duan)	Duan Kan 段龕	Guanggu (350–356) (near Qingzhou, Shandong)	Former Yan	Modern Shandong province in eastern China	—
7	Tuyuhun Kingdom 吐谷渾	329–371; 405–663 (Note: The Tuyuhun polity had three distinct phases. Murong Tuyuhun, an older brother of Former Yan founder Murong Hui, led approximately 1,700 households of Xianbei west from Liaodong beginning c. 285 and settled near Fuhan (Linxia, Gansu) by c. 313. This was a tribal migration, not yet a state. In 329, Murong Tuyuhun's grandson Ye Yan formally established a polity: he set up the Mukechuan headquarters in modern Guinan County, Qinghai, appointed Chinese-style officials (sima and changshi), and adopted "Tuyuhun" as both the clan surname and the state title (國號). In 371, under his son Suixi, the Tuyuhun submitted to the Former Qin and was given the title Marquis of Qiangchuan. After the Former Qin's collapse following the Battle of Fei River (383), successive Tuyuhun leaders Shilian and Shipí became intermittent vassals of the Western Qin, accepting the title King of Bailan (白蘭王). In 390, Shipí rejected this title and attempted to assert independence, but was defeated by Western Qin at Duzhouchuan in 398 and forced to retreat, pay tribute and surrender a hostage. The kingdom was fully re-established in 405 when Shuluogan assumed the titles Grand Commander-in-Chief (大都督), Grand Chanyu (大單于) and King of Tuyuhun (吐谷渾王). Thereafter the Tuyuhun pursued a dual-submission diplomacy, simultaneously accepting titles from the Northern Wei and the Liu Song dynasty to the south, leveraging their control of the western Silk Road routes.)	c. 378 (Note: Combined duration of the two periods of independence (329–371 and 405–663), excluding the period of vassalage to the Former Qin and Western Qin.)	Xianbei (Murong)	Yeyan 叶延 (r. 329–351) (Note: Murong Tuyuhun (d. 317) was the eponymous ancestor who led the westward migration, but the formal state with a declared state title (國號) and administrative structure was established by his grandson Ye Yan in 329.)	Mukechuan 慕克川 (329–376) (near Guinan, Qinghai); Fuqi 伏俟城 (later periods) (near Gonghe, Qinghai)	Tibetan Empire	Modern Qinghai and parts of Gansu and northwestern Sichuan	Numerous successors of the Murong/Tuyuhun clan across nearly four centuries, including Shuluogan 树洛干 (r. 405–417), Achai 阿柴 (r. 417–426) and Muguì 慕璝 (r. 426–436)
8	Wei (Northern) 北魏	386–535	149	Xianbei (Tuoba)	Tuoba Gui 拓跋珪; Posthumous: Emperor Daowu 道武帝 (Note: Tuoba Gui initially restored his family's state as the Kingdom of Dai in early 386, but renamed it Wei (魏) later that year to signal imperial ambition beyond the Tuoba's ancestral frontier. The name invoked Cao Wei, which had ruled northern China from Ye during the Three Kingdoms. The Northern Wei unified northern China in 439, ending the Sixteen Kingdoms period. It is not counted among the Sixteen Kingdoms because it was still in power when the historian Cui Hong compiled his annals.)	Shengle (386–398) (Horinger, Hohhot, Inner Mongolia); Pingcheng (398–494) (Datong, Shanxi); Luoyang (494–534) (Luoyang, Henan)	Split into Eastern Wei and Western Wei (Note: The Northern Wei did not fall to an external conqueror. In 534, a power struggle between rival generals Gao Huan and Yuwen Tai split the dynasty into the Eastern Wei (534–550) based at Ye and the Western Wei (535–556) based at Chang'an. These were succeeded by the Northern Qi and Northern Zhou respectively.)	Initially central Inner Mongolia and northern Shanxi; at its height, all of northern China from Liaoning to Gansu and from the steppe frontier to the Huai River	Tuoba Si 拓跋嗣 (409–423); Tuoba Tao 拓跋燾 (423–452); Tuoba Jun 拓跋濬 (452–465); Tuoba Hong 拓跋弘 (465–471); Yuan Hong 元宏 (471–499); Yuan Ke 元恪 (499–515) and four further emperors to 535

unified northern China to end the Sixteen Kingdoms period Other regimes that outlived the Sixteen Kingdoms period

== History ==
=== Background ===
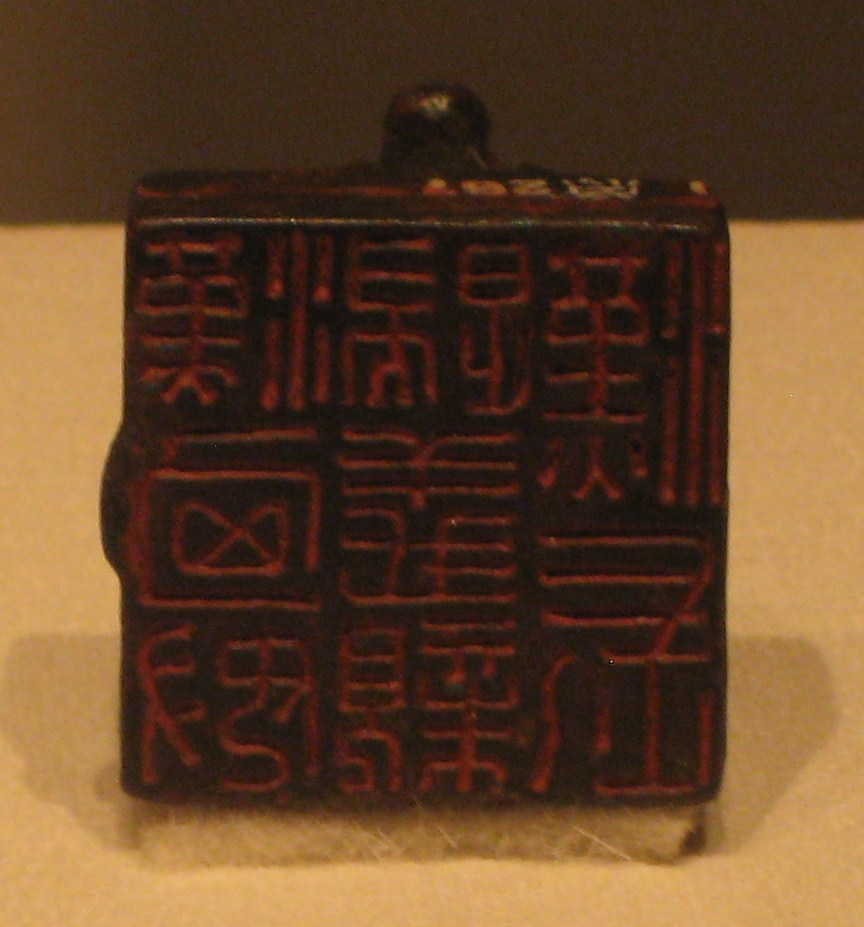
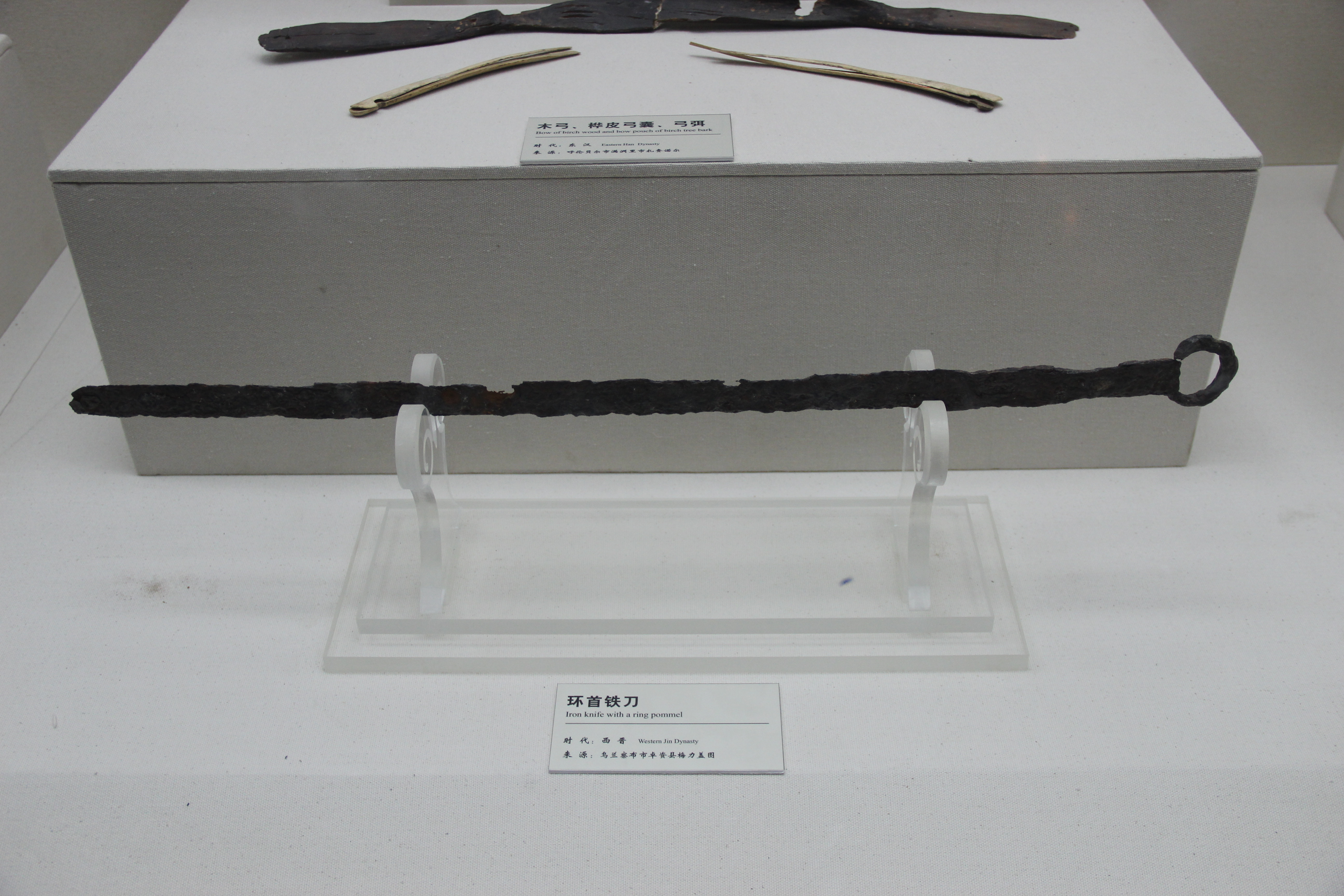
Left: Bronze seal conferred by the Han government upon a Xiongnu chieftain who had submitted to the Eastern Han dynasty (25–220). The seal was unearthed in Shangsunjiazhai, Datong Hui and Tu Autonomous County, Qinghai province in 1979. The Xiongnu that settled in modern-day Hexi Corridor and eastern Qinghai during the Eastern Han became known as the "Lushuihu". Juqu Mengxun, who seized control of the Northern Liang kingdom in 401 was a Lushuihu chieftain. Right: An iron sword with a ring-shaped pommel of the Xianbei from the Western Jin dynasty (266–316) unearthed in Meiligaitu Village, Zhuozi County, Ulanqab, Inner Mongolia. During the Western Jin, the Tuoba Xianbei clan settled in modern-day central Inner Mongolia, serving as a vassal to the Jin court.

Since the Western Han dynasty (202 BC–9 AD), the non-Han peoples of the northern steppe and western highlands had been resettling into northern China. Along the frontiers in the north, the Chinese court employed a policy of recruiting surrendered tribes to serve as auxiliaries to defend against attacks from nomadic enemies, such as the Xianbei confederation. The Wuhuan tribes submitted as Chinese tributaries in the northeast, and in 50 AD, the Eastern Han dynasty (25–220) established the Southern Xiongnu vassal state in northern Bing province. In the northwest, western herders known as the Qiang and Di were brought in, predominantly to work as farmers and slaves in the Guanzhong basin. As migrants, these people lived among the ethnic Han and were sinicized to different degrees while retaining their tribal affiliations. However, they also faced discrimination and oppression, leading to racial tension and frequent rebellions.

The chaos that followed the fall of Eastern Han (189–220) and the Three Kingdoms period (220–280) brought the non-Han people even closer to the Chinese heartlands. After revolting and murdering their pro-Han chanyu in 189, the Southern Xiongnu tribes dissolved their government and dispersed throughout Bing province. Several frontier commanderies in Bing had to be abandoned, but the area corresponding with modern-day Shanxi was retained, where the remaining Xiongnu were reorganized into the Five Divisions near Taiyuan Commandery. The Wuhuan also mutinied around this time, but were decisively defeated and relocated to areas more to the south. The Xianbei, following the collapse of their own confederation, took advantage of the Wuhuan's decline to settle down along the northern and northeastern frontiers, with tribes such as the Tuoba and Murong pledging vassalage to the Chinese dynasties. In the northwest, the population of the Qiang, Di and other non-Han groups continued to swell, supplemented by the arrival of other Xianbei tribes. By the late 3rd-century, the population of the tribes in the Guanzhong and Shanxi had swelled, prompting some Chinese officials to advocate for their repatriation beyond the borderland.

Despite efforts to appease and punish, disparity between the ethnic Han and tribes persisted into the Western Jin period (266–316). The War of the Eight Princes (291–306) during the reign of the Emperor Hui of Jin severely weakened and divided imperial authority. Corruption was rampant among the Chinese elites and administrators, and popular rebellions against heavy taxation and repression erupted throughout the country. As the Jin princes exhausted the imperial army with their civil wars, they turned to the frontier auxiliaries as their source of military power, placing the tribes in prime position to exploit the chaos.

The beginning of the Sixteen Kingdoms period is often considered to be 304 AD. That year, as part of a rebellion that began back in 301, Li Xiong, a Ba-Di chieftain and refugee from the Guanzhong, formally claimed the imperial title of King and formed his state of Cheng-Han (304–347) in Sichuan, notably becoming the only state among the Sixteen Kingdoms to be based in southwestern China. Most of the later states were also founded by non-Han leaders whose family had lived in China for generations or were in the process of sinicization, and they are collectively known in historiography as the "Five Barbarians".

=== Fall of Western Jin to the Han-Zhao (304–318) ===
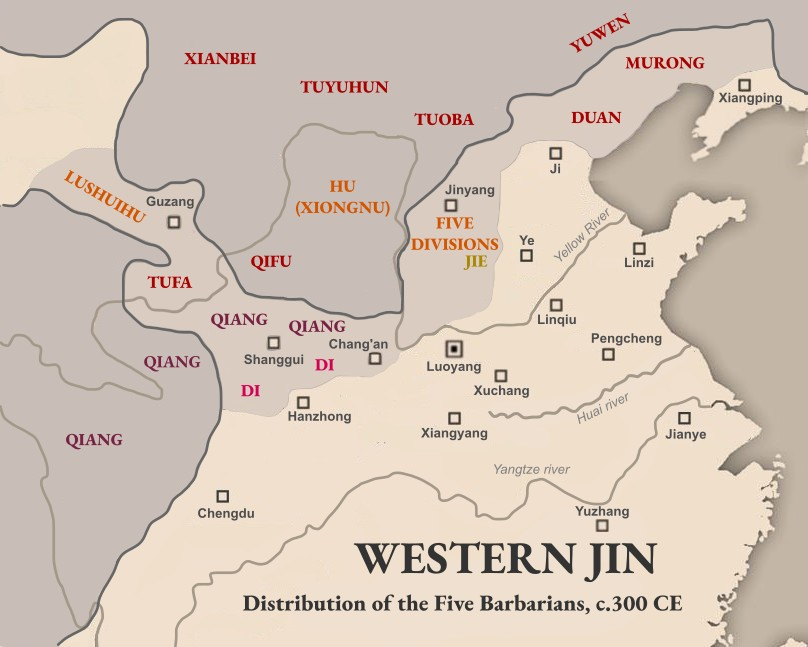
Distribution of the non-Han peoples within and outside of northern China prior to the fall of Western Jin.

During the Jin civil wars, Liu Yuan, a noble from the Five Divisions and a descendant of the Southern Xiongnu chanyu, was serving as a general for one of the princes. The Five Divisions plotted to take advantage of the disorder by staging a revolt with Liu Yuan as their leader. After convincing his prince that he would rally his people to fight for his side, Liu Yuan was allowed to return home to Shanxi, and upon his arrival, he rebelled and openly declared his intent to restore the fallen Han dynasty. His regime, later renamed Zhao, is designated by historians as the Han-Zhao (304–329).

By the end of the War of the Eight Princes in 306, the Jin military in northern China had become severely weakened and ineffective in dealing with the various uprisings led by both the Han Chinese and the tribes. Many of these rebel groups, aggrieved by the civil wars and ongoing famines, flocked to join the Han-Zhao and soon encroached on the Chinese capital of Luoyang. In 311, less than a year after the ascension of Liu Cong to the Han throne, his forces annihilated the Jin imperial army and captured Luoyang along with Emperor Huai in the Disaster of Yongjia. In 316, the Western Jin came to an end after Liu Cong's cousin Liu Yao seized Chang'an and Emperor Min, though pockets of Jin resistance continued to resist in the north. In the south, where the provinces were mostly unaffected by the chaos in the north, the prince, Sima Rui claimed the imperial title at Jiankang, preserving the dynasty as the Eastern Jin (318–420).

=== Rise and fall of Later Zhao (318–351) ===
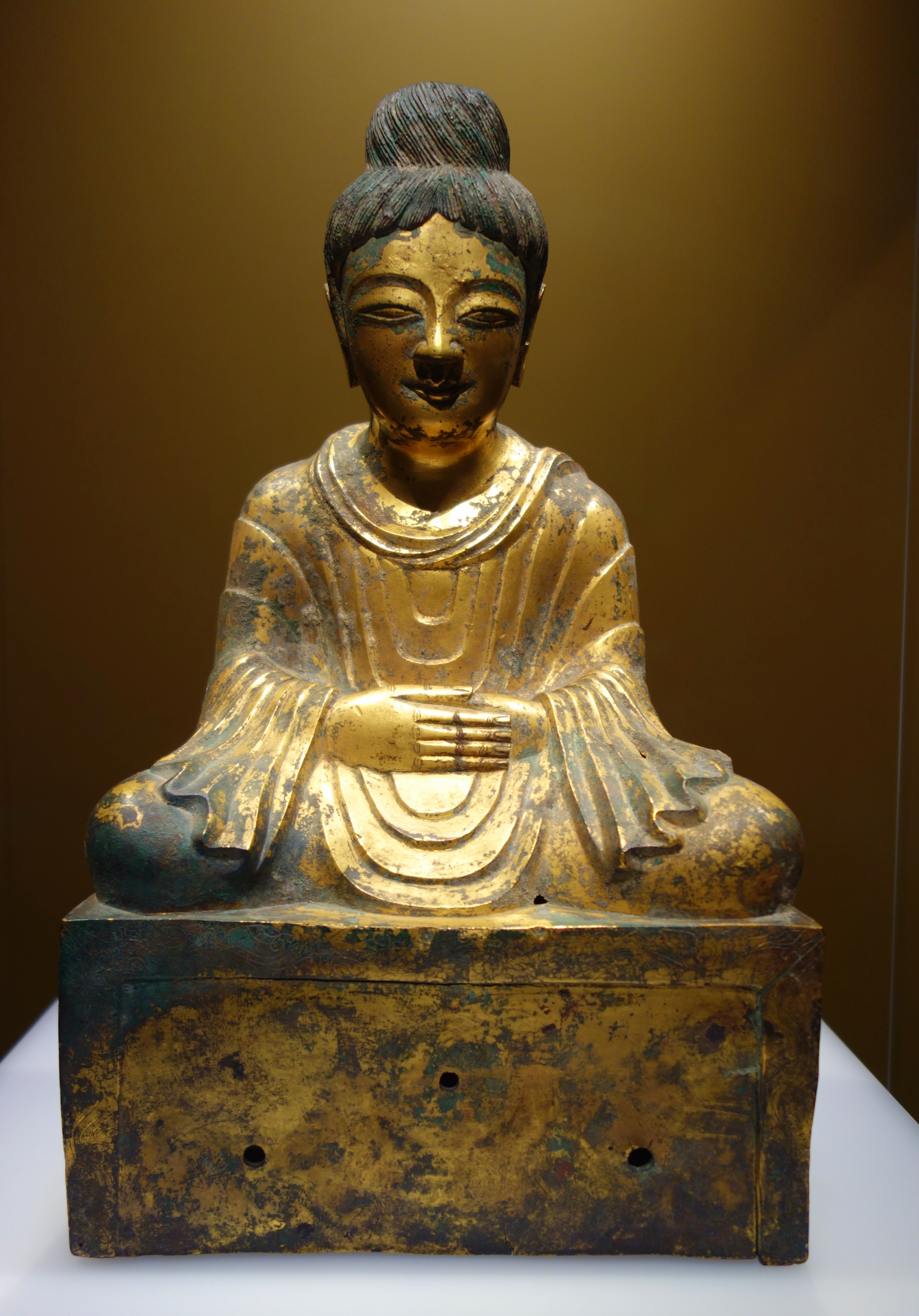
A bronze Buddha statue created under the Later Zhao during the reign of Shi Hu in 338. It is the earliest known Buddha sculpture produced in China.

After Liu Cong's death in 318, a failed coup was launch which saw his successor and most of the Han imperial family wiped out. The empire soon split between Liu Yao in the west and the powerful general, Shi Le in the east. Shi Le was an ethnic Jie, a group that emerged from the Southern Xiongnu in Bing province. Their exact origins is still disputed, with some theorizing that they were of Central Asian stock whose ancestors became subordinate tribes to the Xiongnu. Shi Le initially worked as an indentured farm laborer before joining Liu Yuan's rebellion, and during his stint as a Han general, he gained considerable power over the Hebei, ruling in all but name. In 319, he founded the Later Zhao (319–351), and after a decade-long confrontation, he decisively defeated Liu Yao at the Battle of Luoyang and destroyed the Han-Zhao in 329, placing most of northern China under his control.

To consolidate his rule, Shi Le reinforced the dual-system of government introduced by the Han-Zhao to impose separate governance for the Chinese and non-Chinese. After he died, his adoptive brother, Shi Hu seized the throne from his son in 334 and ruled the empire for the next 15 years. Shi Hu was described by records as a cruel and tyrannical ruler, especially towards the common Han Chinese people. On the other hand, he supported the proliferation of Buddhism in the north. He employed the Kuchean monk, Fotu Cheng as one of his chief court advisors, allowing him to spread his teachings among the common people and build hundreds of monasteries. Shi Hu maintained a stalemate with the Eastern Jin and other neighbouring states, unable to make significant gains from his military campaigns. After his death in 349, his family members engaged in a fratricidal succession for the throne, culminating in his adopted Han Chinese grandson, Ran Min, seizing the government and carrying out a large-scale ethnic cleansing of the Jie people. The Later Zhao was soon destroyed by Ran Min in 351.

During the fall of Western Jin, some Chinese officials opted to find refuge in the farthest reaches of northern China, which later remained largely independent from Later Zhao control. In Gansu, the Chinese provincial inspector, Zhang Gui and his family governed the region as early as 301 and continued to do so long after the Western Jin's demise. Though they outwardly remained loyal to the Eastern Jin and never claimed the imperial title (with the exception of Zhang Zuo), their remoteness from the southern court allowed them to self-govern without much intervention, so historiography often refer to them as a sovereign regime known as the Former Liang (301–376). The Former Liang preserved much of Han literati culture in the north and expanded their influence into the Western Regions.

Around the Liao river basin, the Murong clan of Xianbei ethnicity also professed their allegiance to the Eastern Jin, but internally vied for independence. The Murong allowed Chinese refugees to settle in their domain and employed them as officials to serve in their civil administration. In 337, while still claiming to be a vassal of Jin, their chieftain, Murong Huang took the title of Prince and founded the Former Yan (337–370). He conquered the rival Duan and Yuwen tribes as well as forced the Goguryeo and Buyeo into submission, thus allowing his state to compete with the Later Zhao. Other regimes that existed around this time but are not listed among the Sixteen Kingdoms are the Tuoba-Xianbei of Dai and the Di-led Chouchi.

=== Former Qin and the brief unification of northern China (351–383) ===
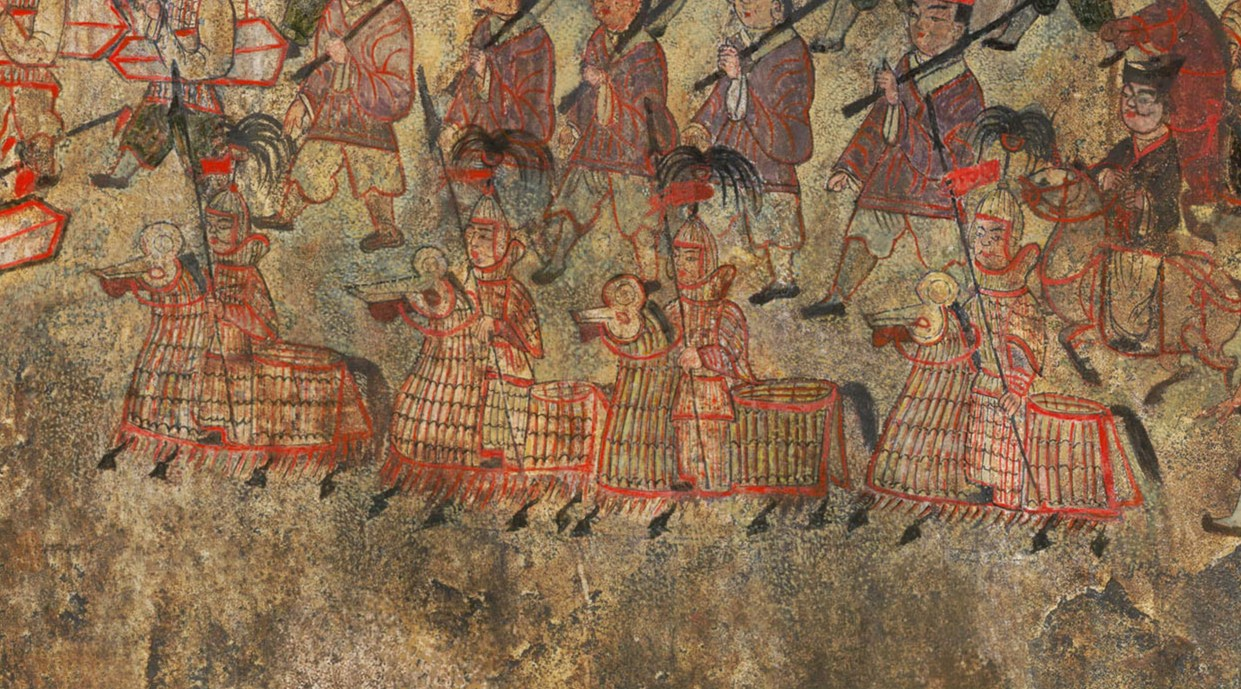
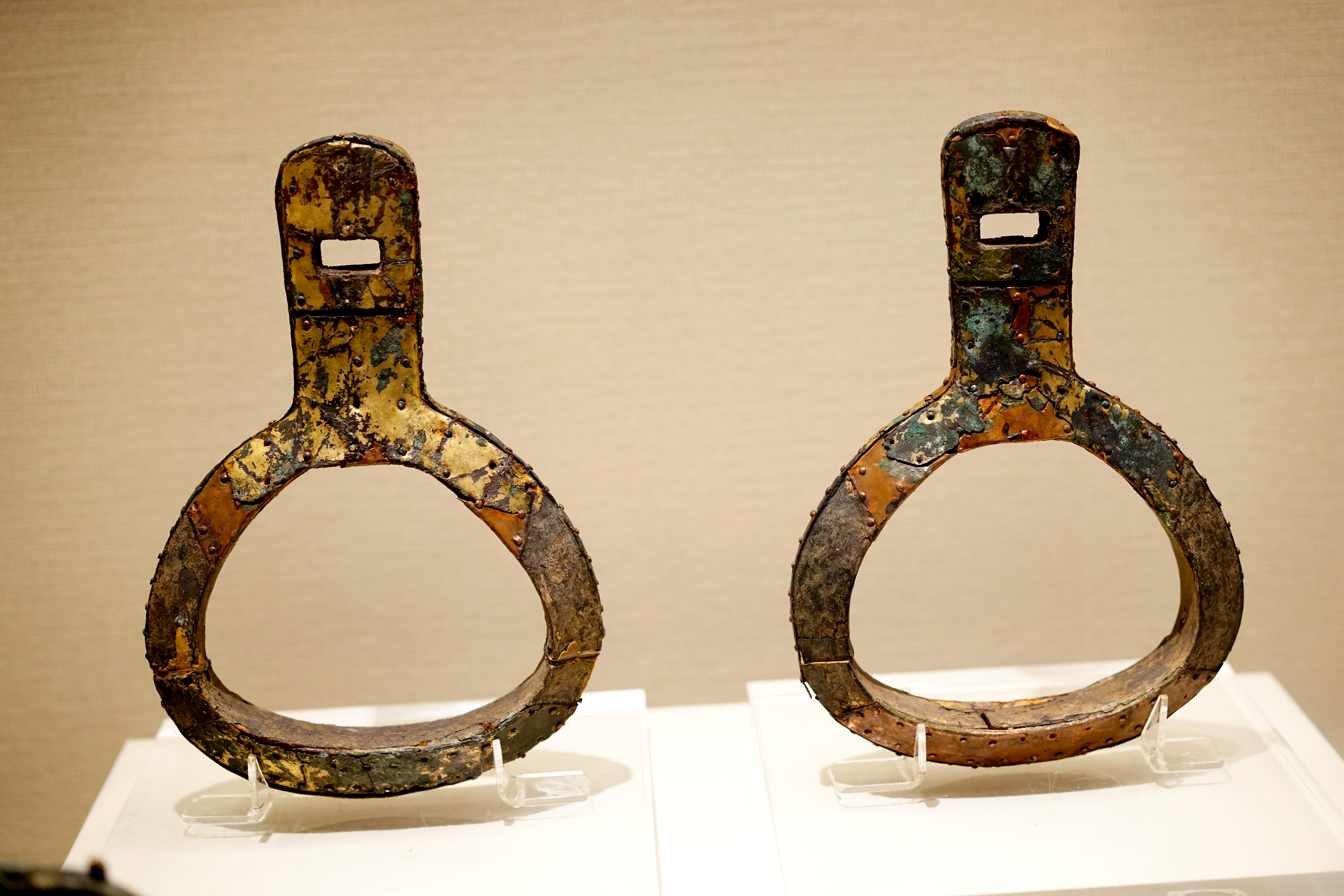
Left: Painting of heavy cavalry (cataphracts) from the 4th-century tomb of Dong Shou, a Former Yan general who fled to Goguryeo. Right: The earliest extant of the double stirrup from the tomb of a Northern Yan noble. The development of the stirrup during this period gave rise to widespread use of heavy cavalry and allowed the Xianbei horsemen to dominate the battlefield.

In the course of the Later Zhao collapse, Ran Min formed his new state of Ran Wei (350–352). However, many Zhao generals refused to acknowledge him, and northern China fragmented into numerous regions controlled by warlords. The Former Yan, under Murong Jun, seized the moment to expand into the Central Plains. In 352, his brother, Murong Ke defeated and captured Ran Min at the Battle of Liantai. Murong Jun thereupon broke away from the Eastern Jin and proclaimed himself as emperor. The Yan continued their southward expansion, reaching all the way to the Huai river and establishing dominance over the northeast. After Murong Jun's death in 360, Murong Ke acted as regent for his child heir and maintained the Yan's military supremacy through his competent leadership. However, when he too died in 367, the issues of unbridled corruption among the aristorcracy and infighting within the imperial family became evident and rapidly worsened.

Among the states that emerged from the chaos was the Former Qin (351–394), established by the Later Zhao general, Fu Jiàn of Di ethnicity who captured and secured control over the Guanzhong Basin. In 357, his nephew Fu Jiān seized the throne from his despotic son in a coup. Despite his ethnicity, the younger Fu Jiān revered Confucianism and entrusted most of state affairs to his ethnic Chinese advisor, Wang Meng. The two passed new policies and reforms to help the Qin recover from the early wars and famines, while also effectively putting down rebellions and corruption throughout their domain. Within a decade, the Former Qin was transformed into a regional power in the northwest, competing with both the Former Yan and Eastern Jin.

In 370, Wang Meng led the Former Qin to invade the Former Yan, and though outnumbered, he was able to vanquish them in one fell swoop. Riding on his momentum, Fu Jiān unified northern China by subjugating the Chouchi, Former Liang and Dai while also capturing Sichuan from the Eastern Jin by 376. Fu Jiān had a tendency to spare and recruit his enemies, employing many of them in his government and military. With most of China under his rule, he sought to complete the unification by ending the Eastern Jin once and for all. Wang Meng opposed this move, and before his death in 375, he warned Fu Jiān that he first needed to address the growing friction between the various ethnic groups within his empire, especially in regards to the Xianbei and Qiang, but Fu Jiān did not heed his advice. In 383, he launched an invasion of southern China, where his massive army was defeated in a devastating rout at the Battle of Fei River by a significantly smaller Eastern Jin force.

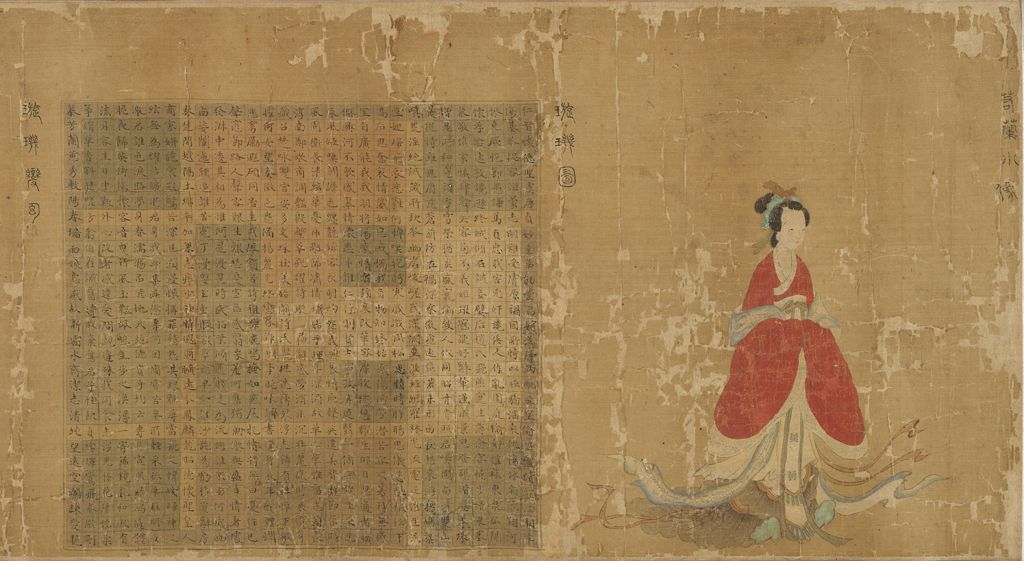
17th-century portrait of the Former Qin poet, Su Hui with her palindrome poem, the Star Gauge (璇璣圖). Few poems from the Sixteen Kingdoms survived, and the Star Gauge is unique as it consists of 29 by 29 grid of characters which can be read in roughly 3,000 different ways.

=== Fragmentation after the Battle of Feishui (383–394) ===
After the Battle of Feishui, the power of the Former Qin quickly unraveled as numerous regimes in the north began to break loose. In 384, Fu Jiān's general and a prince of the fallen Former Yan, Murong Chui rebelled in the Hebei and founded the Later Yan (384–409), intending to restore his family's dynasty. His relatives responded by forming the Western Yan (384–394; not listed among the Sixteen Kingdom) and laid siege on Fu Jiān at his capital in Chang'an. During the war, Fu Jiān's general of Qiang ethnicity, Yao Chang also rebelled and established the Later Qin (384–417). In 385, the Western Yan ousted Fu Jiān from Chang'an, and he was soon captured and executed by Yao Chang.

More states began to spring up in light of Fu Jiān's death. That same year, the Xianbei former vassal, Qifu Guoren founded the Western Qin (385–431) in eastern Gansu and the Chouchi was restored. In 386, the Di general, Lü Guang established the Later Liang (386–403) in western Gansu while another Xianbei leader, Tuoba Gui revived the Dai as the Northern Wei (386–535; not listed among the Sixteen Kingdoms) on the northern borderland. During the Later Yan's conquest of the northeast, the Dingling troops under Murong Chui mutinied, and in 388, they formed their state of Zhai Wei (388–392; not listed among the Sixteen Kingdoms).

=== Later Qin and the propagation of Buddhism (394–417) ===
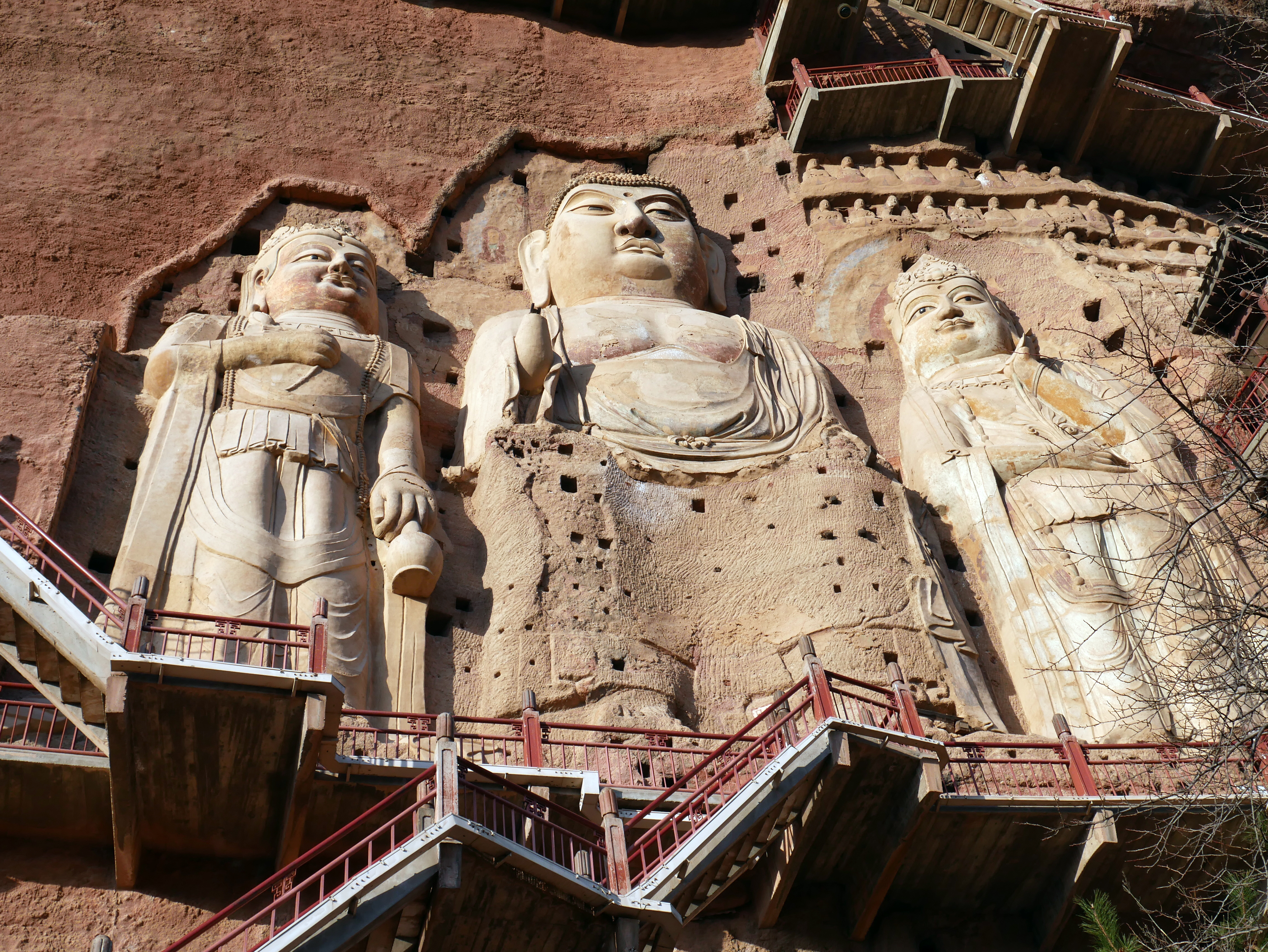
Bodhisattva sculptures at Maijishan Grottoes, a series of Buddhist rock-cut caves in Tianshui, Gansu. Construction of the grottoes began during the Later Qin period and was expanded by later dynasties such as the Western Qin and Northern Wei. These specific sculptures, however, were only first constructed under the Sui dynasty.

Yao Chang spent his reign fighting against remnants of the Former Qin for supremacy over the Guanzhong Basin before dying of illness in 394. He was succeeded by his son, Yao Xing, who shortly after crushed the Former Qin military in battle. The last Former Qin emperor was killed in Western Qin territory, giving Yao Xing sole power over the Guanzhong. Yao Xing soon restored order and prosperity to the region, and later conquered Henan from the Eastern Jin. The Later Qin's suzerainty was recognized by several of their neighbouring states such as the Later Liang and Western Qin, who all offered their nominal submissions.

Much like Fu Jiān, Yao Xing strongly adhered to Confucian principles. He turned Chang'an into an education hub by establishing schools and attracting many prospective scholars near and far. He was also a devout follower of Buddhism and actively spread the religion through widespread state support. In 401, after defeating the Later Liang into submission, he welcomed into his court the Kuchean monk, Kumārajīva and sponsored him to translate many Buddhist sutras, treatises and other texts from Sanskrit to Chinese. Mahayana Buddhism flourished under Yao Xing, with most of the Later Qin population following the teachings of the Buddha.

North of the Later Qin heartlands was the Ordos Plateau, which had long been home to various roaming Xiongnu and Xianbei tribes. These tribes, under threat by the Northern Wei in the east, submitted to the Qin and acted as a buffer on their northern frontier. As the raids on these tribes intensified, the Later Qin launched a retaliatory campaign against Wei, but suffered a decisive defeat at the Battle of Chaibi in 402. From there, the empire stagnated, and when the Qin reached a peace agreement with Wei in 407, Helian Bobo of the Tiefu tribe rebelled in the Ordos and founded the Helian Xia (407–431). The Later Qin was thrown into a protracted war that drained the empire's resources and caused Yao Xing to lose sway over his other vassals. When Yao Xing died of illness in 416, he also left his heir contending with his relatives over the throne. Capitalizing on the Later Qin's turmoil, the Eastern Jin commander, Liu Yu, led a campaign from the south and conquered them the following year.

==== Gansu: The Four Liangs and Western Qin ====
In the Gansu, the Later Liang came to blows with the Western Qin. Though they gained the upper hand early on, the Liang were badly routed and suffered heavy losses during their invasion of Qin in 397. The defeat sparked upheaval in Later Liang, as soon after, the Xianbei chieftain, Tufa Wugu broke away and founded the Southern Liang (397–414), followed by the Chinese governor, Duan Ye, who established the Northern Liang (397–439) with the support of the Lushuihu chieftain, Juqu Mengxun. In 400, the Chinese general, Li Gao rebelled against the Northern Liang and formed the Western Liang (400–421). The next year, Juqu Mengxun deposed Duan Ye and took over the Northern Liang.

Between 400 and 401, the Later Qin carried out two western expeditions to Gansu, annexing the Western Qin and forcing the four Liangs into nominal submission. Unable to withstand any more attacks, the Later Liang gave up their remaining territory to the Later Qin in 403. As the Later Qin weakened, the Southern Liang broke off relations in 407 while the Western Qin reestablished themselves in 409. The Southern Liang suffered heavy losses on the battlefield and fell to the Western Qin in 414. In 421, Juqu Mengxun pacified the Western Liang, leaving Northern Liang and Western Qin to compete for Gansu. Due to internal and external pressure, the Western Qin declined and were subjugated by the Helian Xia in 431, giving the Northern Liang sole control over Gansu for a brief period of time. Much like the Later Qin, Buddhism also flourished among the rival Gansu states, as monks held important government positions and Buddhist temple grottoes were built throughout the region.

=== Northern Wei and the reunification of northern China (394–439) ===
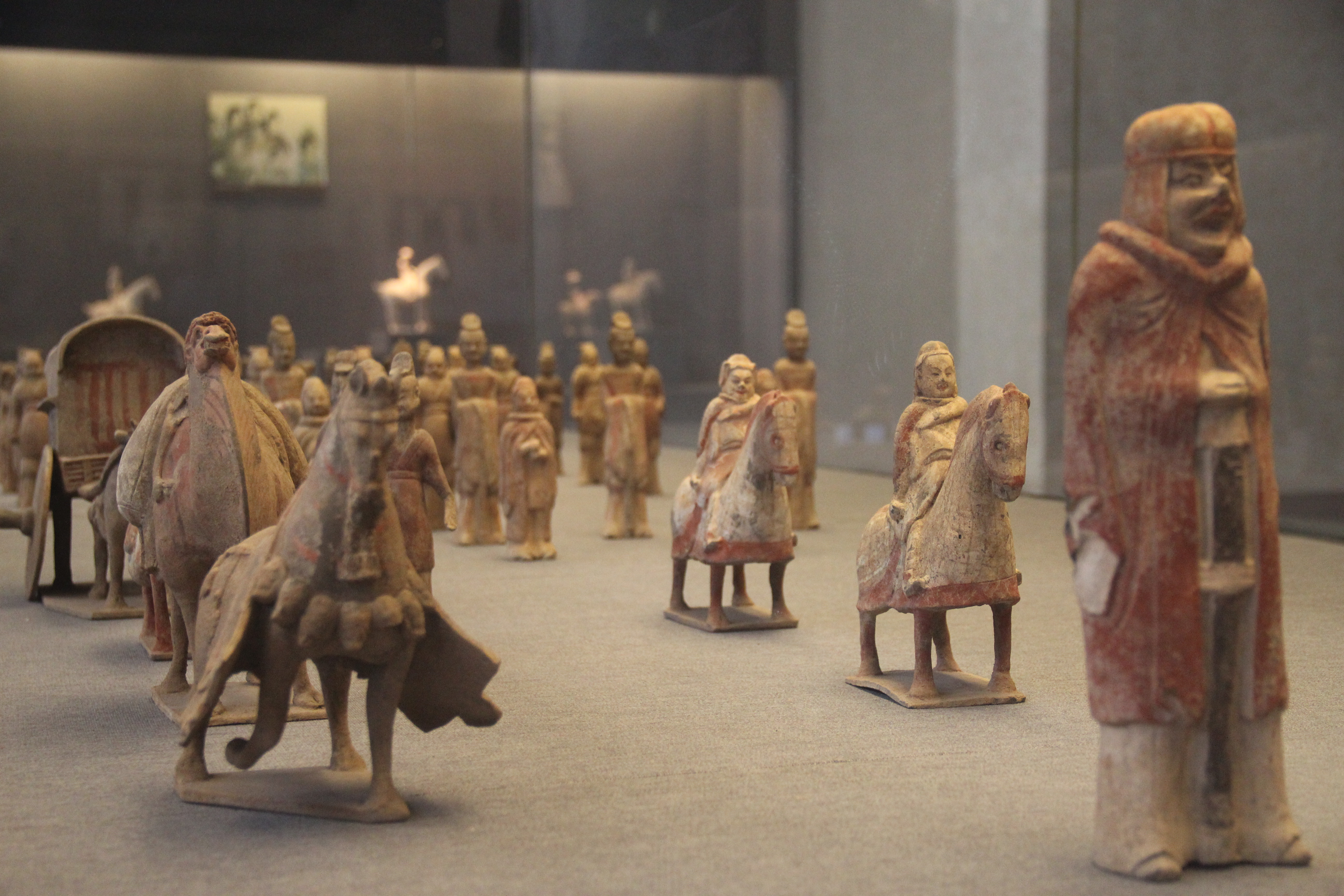
Procession

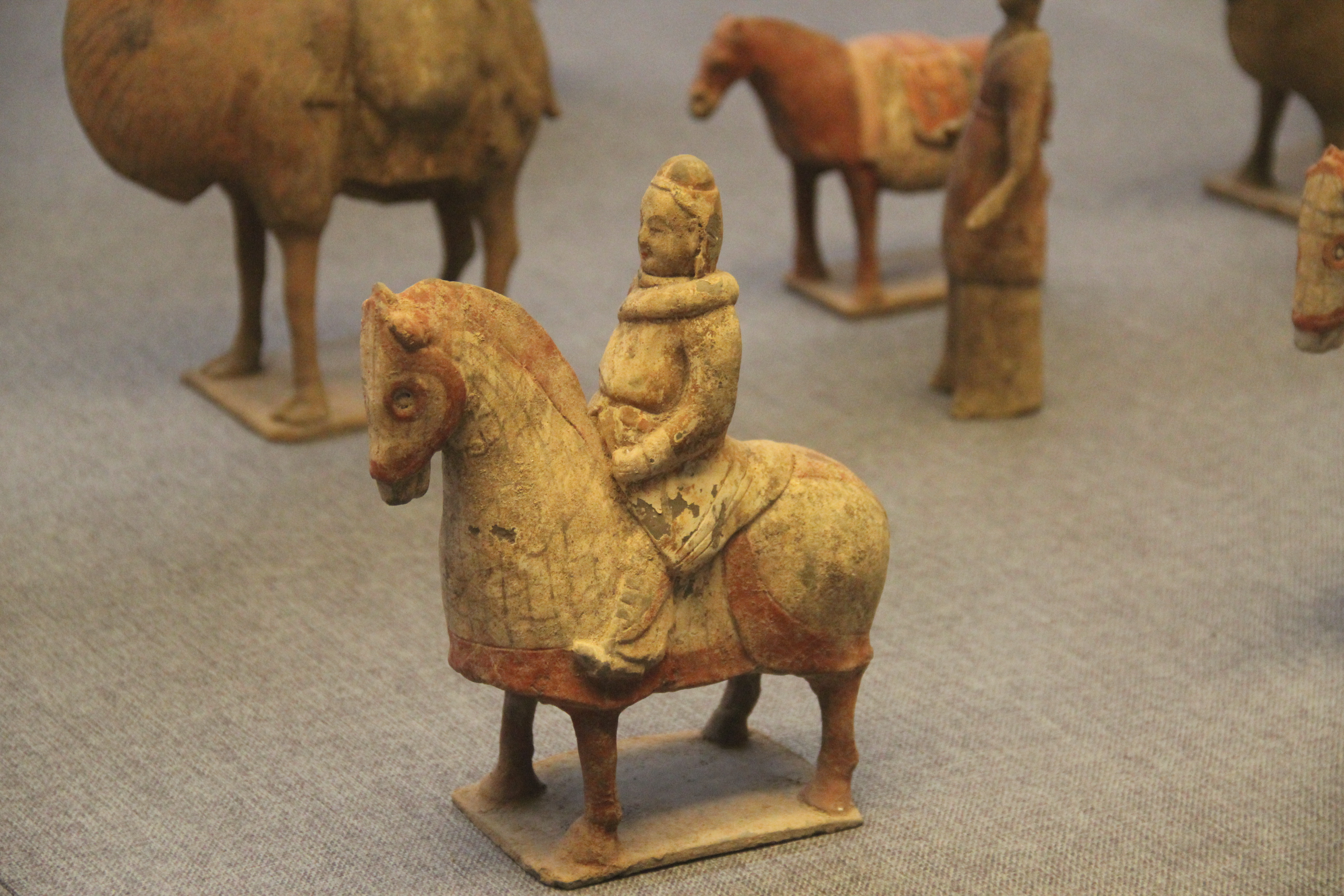
Mounted warrior

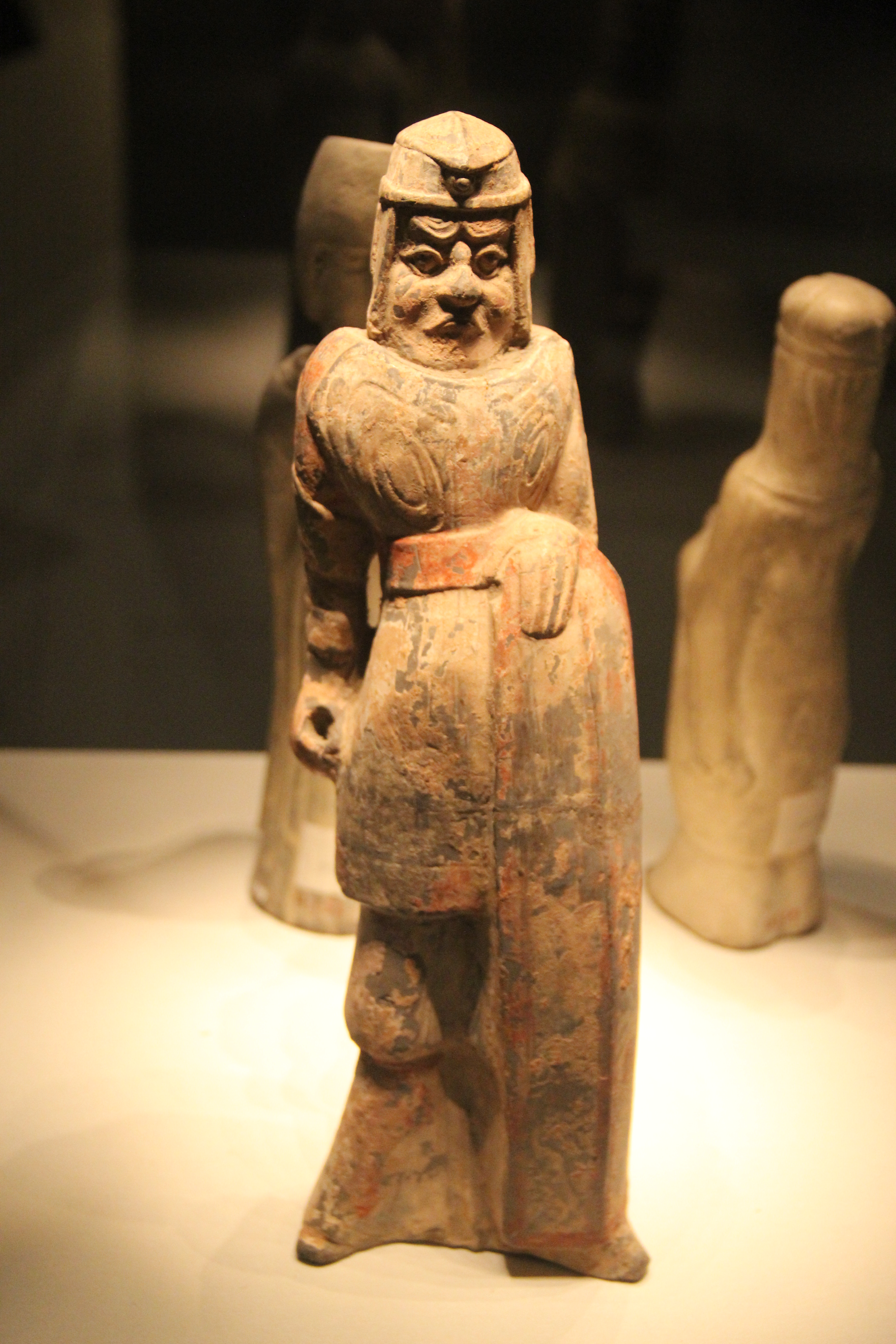
Warrior with shield

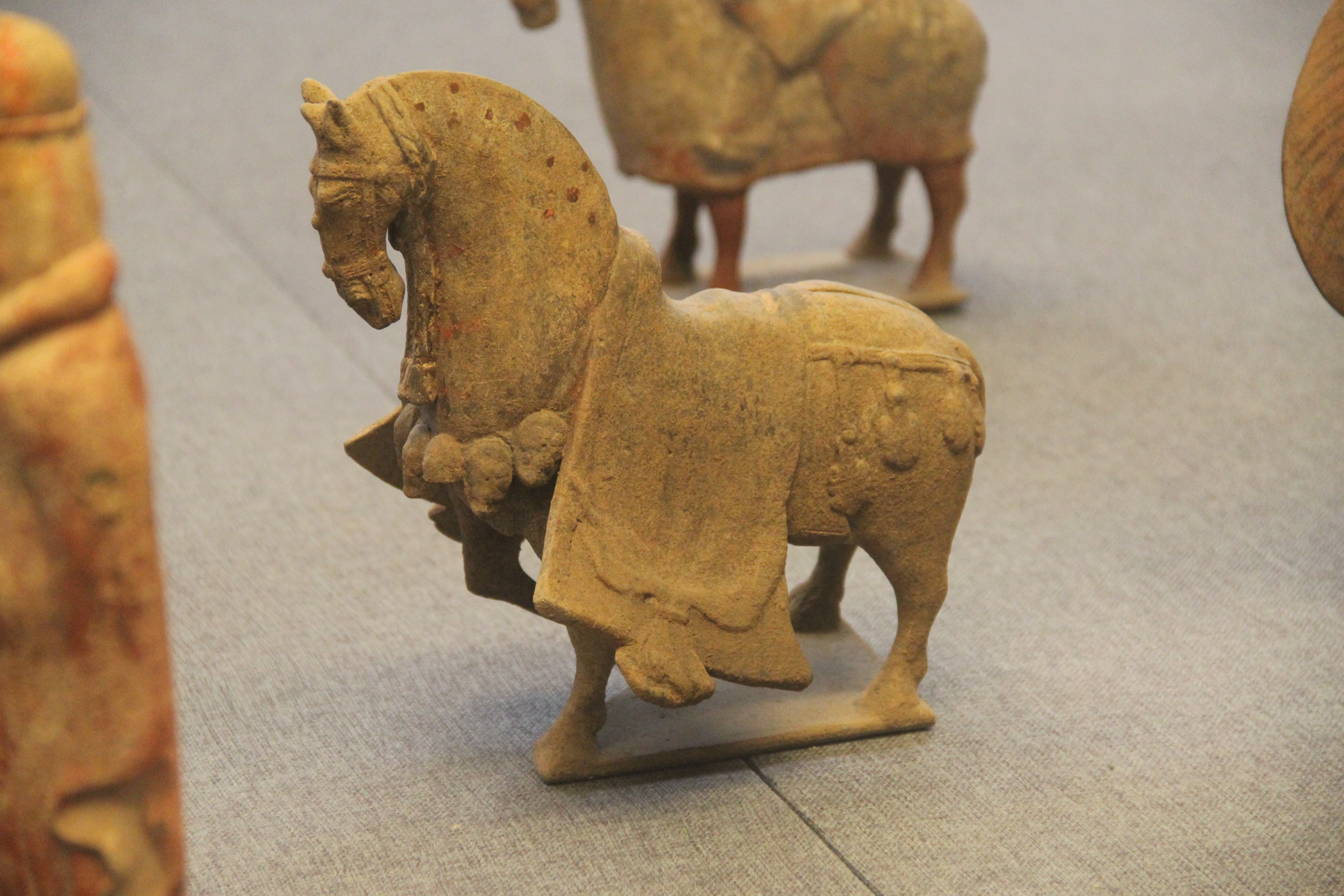
Horse

Terracotta warriors of the Northern Wei dynasty

==== Division of Later Yan ====
In the northeast, Murong Chui spent the majority of his reign waging war and quelling rebellions to recover his family's holdings in the northeast. He extinguished the Zhai Wei in 392 and conquered the Western Yan in 394. Yet, his former ally, the Northern Wei under Tuoba Gui remained a nuisance to his empire. In 395, he sent his sons to lead a punitive expedition against the Northern Wei, but Tuoba Gui dealt them a grave defeat at the Battle of Canhe Slope. In 396, Murong Chui personally led another campaign to Northern Wei in retribution, but died of illness along the way.

Not long after Murong Chui's heir took the throne, Tuoba Gui launched his own invasion of Later Yan. The Yan decided to concentrate their forces to their major cities, which allowed the Northern Wei to overrun the Central Plains. Tuoba Gui initially struggled to take their cities, but he eventually made a breakthrough when he routed main Later Yan forces at the Battle of Baisi. Subsequently, the Murong family fell into infighting; the emperor decided to evacuate his capital for his ancestral home in Liaodong, while an offshoot led by his uncle, Murong De founded the Southern Yan (398–410) and occupied the Shandong region. Though the Wei campaign soon came to an end, the Murong never recovered from their loss and remained as rump states. A decade later, the Later Yan branch was replaced in a coup by the Northern Yan (407–436), whose founder, Gao Yun was of Goguryeo descent, but his successor, Feng Ba, was a Han Chinese.

==== Reunification of Emperor Taiwu ====
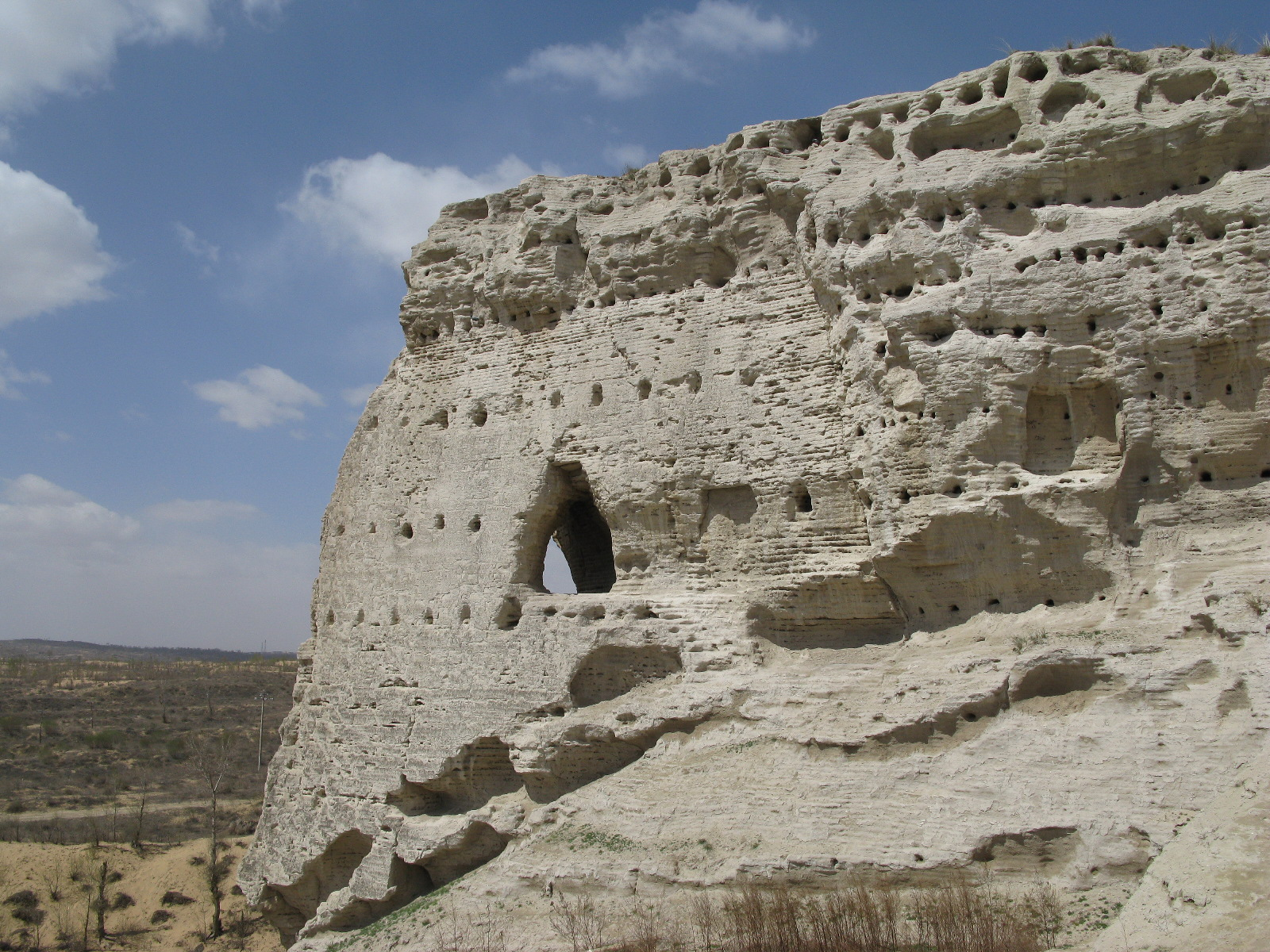
Ruins of Tongwancheng, the capital of the Helian Xia built in the early 5th century by Tiefu chieftain Helian Bobo in modern-day Jingbian, in northern Shaanxi province, near the border with Inner Mongolia. The city was captured by the Northern Wei in 427.

With the Yan splintered into two, the Northern Wei supplanted them as the new powerhouse in the northeast, and Tuoba Gui began to consolidate his family's rule over the Central Plains. Following his assassination in 409, his son, Tuoba Si, posthumously known as Emperor Mingyuan, succeeded him and continued to prioritize internal affairs, therby stabilizing the state after years of military expansion. In the northwest, shortly after the fall of Later Qin to Eastern Jin, Helian Bobo took the opportunity to seize the Guanzhong as Liu Yu returned to the south in 418.

In 423, Emperor Taiwu of Northern Wei ascended the throne with ambitions to unify northern China. Following the death of Helian Bobo in 425, he intensified his attacks on the Helian Xia that by 428, he had captured both the Xia capital, Tongwancheng and their emperor. The emperor's brother, Helian Ding succeeded him and continued to resist. He made a last-ditch effort to save the empire by expanding westward, even conquering the weakened Western Qin in 431. However, as he attempted to invade the Northern Liang later that year, he was captured in a raid by the Tuyuhun nomads of modern Qinghai and sent to the Northern Wei as a prisoner.

With the Xia's demise, northern reunification under Wei became inevitable. Taiwu soon turned his focus to the Northern Yan by launching incessant raids on their border. Eventually, in 436, the Northern Yan ruler was unable to resist a large-scale invasion by the Wei and fled his territory for Goguryeo. Only the Northern Liang remained, and despite their marriage alliance, Taiwu accused the Liang of plotting rebellion and sent a expeditionary force into Gansu in 439. After a few months of siege, the last ruler of Northern Liang surrendered. The Sixteen Kingdoms era came to an end, as the Northern Wei would rule the north for nearly a century.

== Relations with Eastern Jin ==
=== Diplomatic status ===
Migration routes into southern China during the fall of Western Jin.

For the majority of the period, the Sixteen Kingdoms coincided with the Eastern Jin dynasty in southern China. Most people at the time viewed the Eastern Jin as a direct continuation of the Western Jin, since they were ruled by the same imperial Sima clan albeit distant members, and therefore had more right to rule than the other coinciding states. The Eastern Jin insisted on their status as supreme overlord and refused to treat any of their adversaries as equals. For instance, when the Later Zhao sent a diplomatic mission to the south to establish equal relations, they burnt the embassy's gifts and expelled the envoy. Some of the Sixteen Kingdoms such as Former Liang and Former Yan also agreed to nominally recognize the Eastern Jin as their suzerain for their source of legitimacy.

=== Eastern Jin efforts to retake the north ===
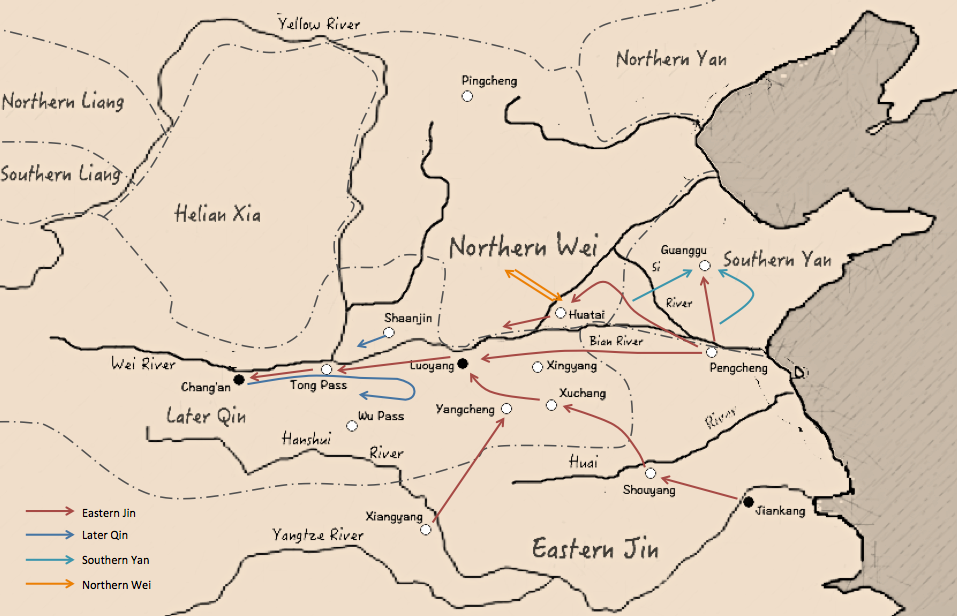
Map showing Liu Yu's northern expeditions (409–417).

Yet, the Eastern Jin court was often divided on the subject of reclaiming lost territory. Many among the Jin elites, both the southern natives and northern migrants, enjoyed their new influence in the south and were content with maintaining a border along or above the Huai river in the north. On the other hand, reunification was still recognized as a moral obligation, and military generals who bring success from their campaigns were rewarded with titles and prestige. There were real concerns that powerful commanders would use the influence they gained from their campaigns as leverage against the court and the emperor. Hence, the court was often reluctant and passive in supporting expeditions against the Sixteen Kingdoms.

The first significant attempt to retake the north was carried out by Zu Ti, who led a voluntary expedition force in response to Emperor Min's call to arms in 313. Sima Rui, then still a prince, showed little interest in the expedition, and only provided Zu Ti very meager resources. Despite his limitations, Zu Ti managed to recapture a large swath of the Henan south of the Yellow River and repeatedly defeated the Later Zhao. However, with civil war looming back home, Sima Rui abruptly ended the expedition by stripping Zu Ti off his commanding role in 321, and his gains were swiftly reversed the following year.

The aftermath of Wang Dun and Su Jun's rebellions further discouraged the Jin court from launching any more expeditions as they required time to recuperate from their losses. Nonetheless, in 346–347, without prior authorization of the court, the general, Huan Wen invaded and ended the Cheng-Han state, bringing Sichuan back under Jin rule. Interest in recovering lost territory grew during the collapse of the Later Zhao, and Huan Wen was able to pressure the court into giving him command over the expeditionary forces. His first expedition against the Former Qin in 354 was unsuccessful, but his second expedition in 356 saw him recover the old capital of Luoyang. In 369, in his bid to claim the Jin throne, Huan Wen launched his third and final northern expedition against the Former Yan, but the campaign ended in failure as he suffered defeat at the Battle of Fangtou.

Not long after, Huan Wen died of illness and the Eastern Jin was faced with the rising power of Former Qin. Early on, the Jin lost Sichuan in 373 and then the major city of Xiangyang in 379. However, after their victory at the Battle of Feishui in 383, Jin forces led by Xie Xuan, Liu Laozhi others were able to recover them and push the Former Qin back all the way to the Yellow River. From there, the Eastern Jin reached a deadlock, and as internal strife and civil war plagued the Jin once more, the Later Qin seized the chance to annex the Henan while the Southern Yan occupied Shandong in 399.

In 404, the Jin general, Liu Yu defeated the usurper, Huan Xuan and restored Emperor An to the throne. Liu Yu had ambitions to claim the throne for himself and built his legitimacy by launching northern expeditions. In 409–410, he led Jin forces to defeat and destroy the Southern Yan, thus recapturing the Shandong. In 416, taking advantage of the death of Yao Xing, he invaded Henan and captured Luoyang before turning towards the Guanzhong and seizing Chang'an. The last Later Qin ruler surrendered and was sent to Jiankang for execution. With the Later Qin destroyed, the Western Qin, Northern Liang and Western Liang nominally submitted to Eastern Jin authority. However, due to pressing matters back in the south, Liu Yu was forced to return, and in his absence, the Helian Xia invaded and conquered the Guanzhong. Despite the loss of the basin, Liu Yu's expeditions were enough for him to usurp the throne and establish the Liu Song dynasty (420–479). The Liu Song and the rest of the Southern dynasties continued to wage war against their northern counterparts before the northern Sui dynasty (581–618) eventually unified China in 589.

== Maps ==
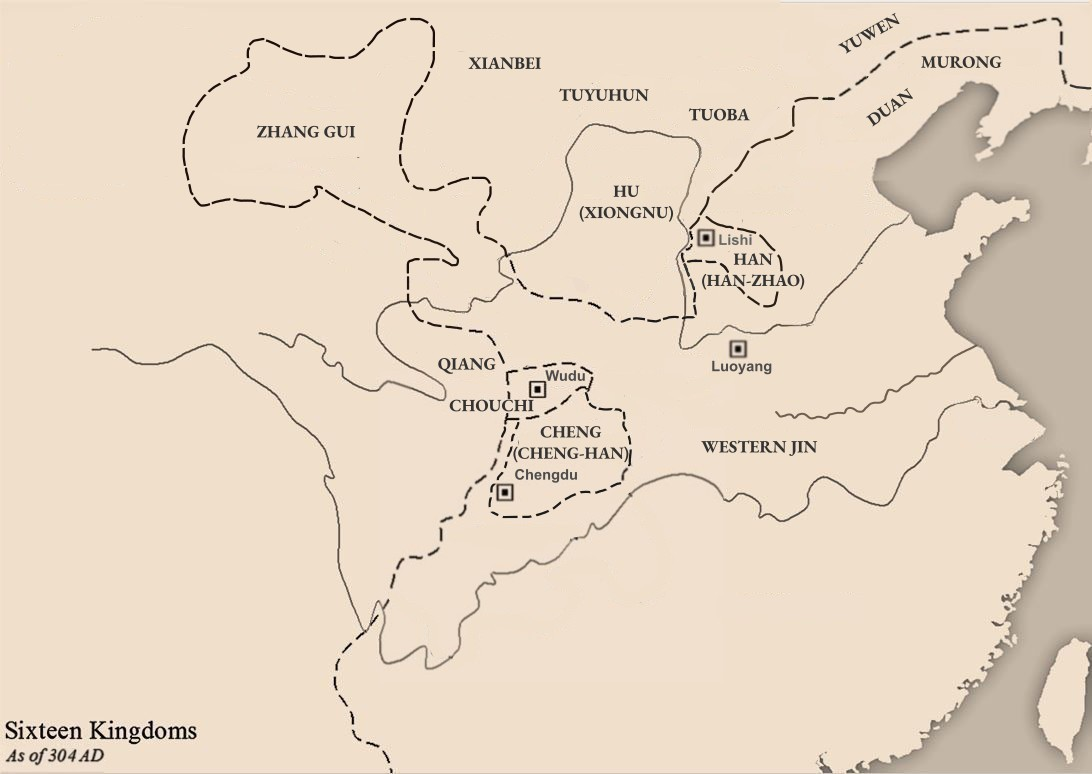
304 – Beginning of the Sixteen Kingdoms

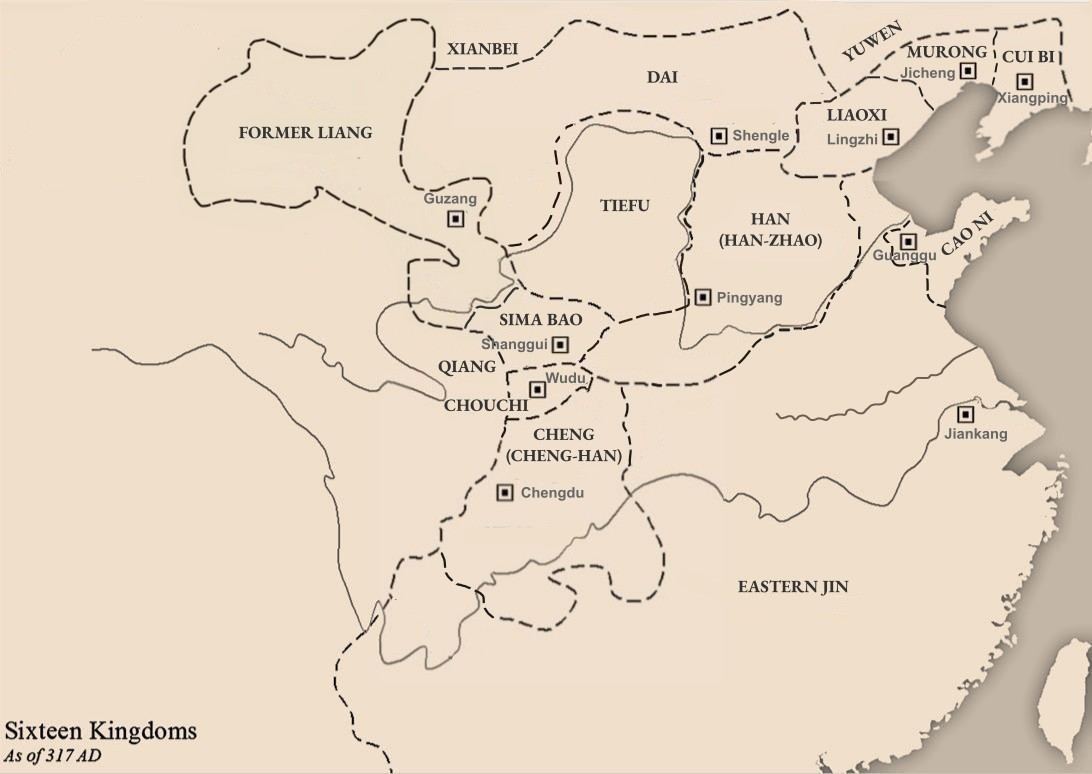
317 – Fall of Western Jin

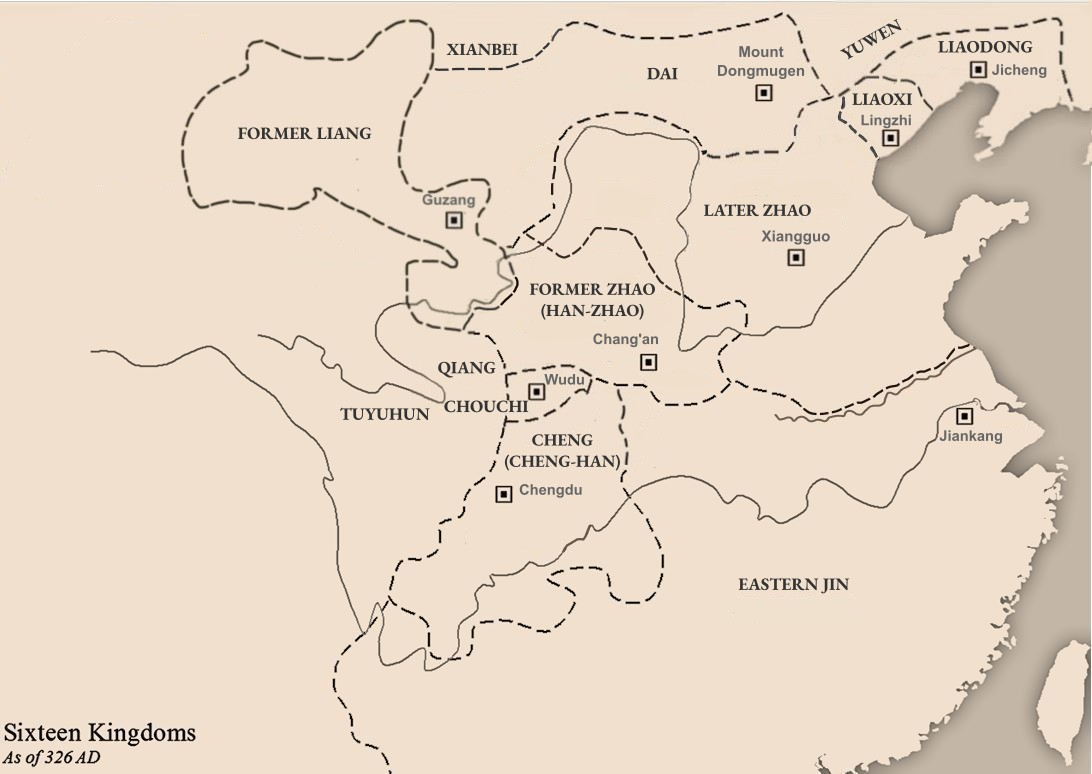
326 – Former Zhao–Later Zhao confrontation

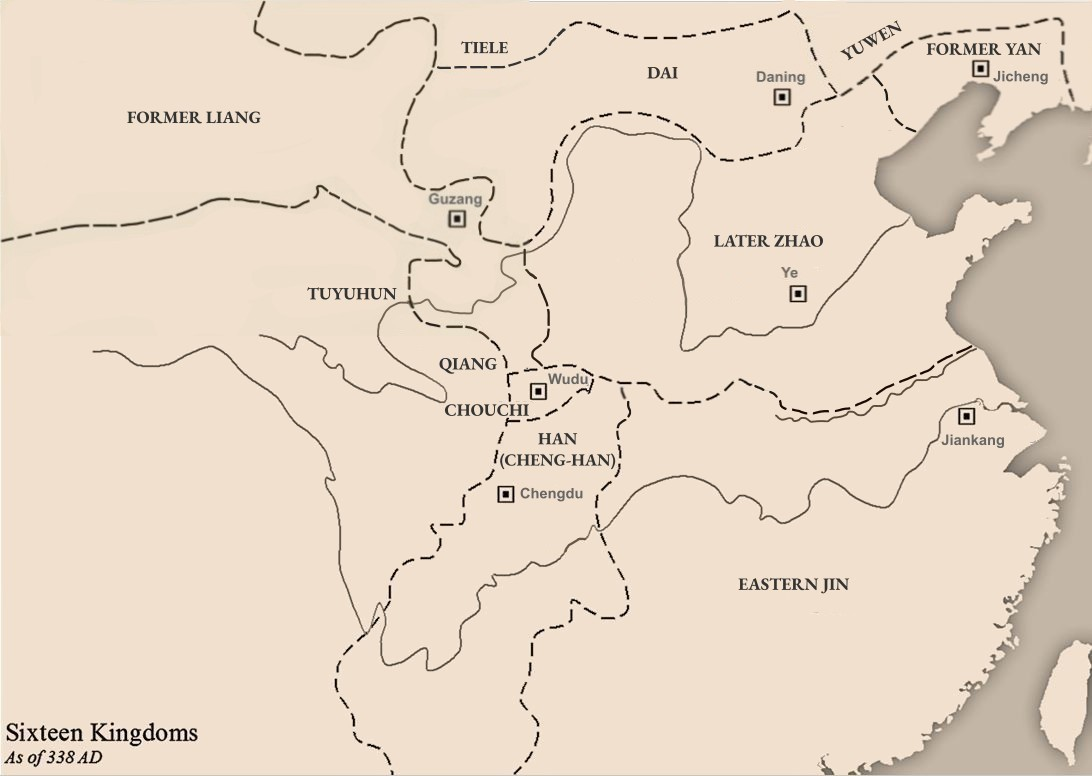
338 – Later Zhao "reunification" of northern China

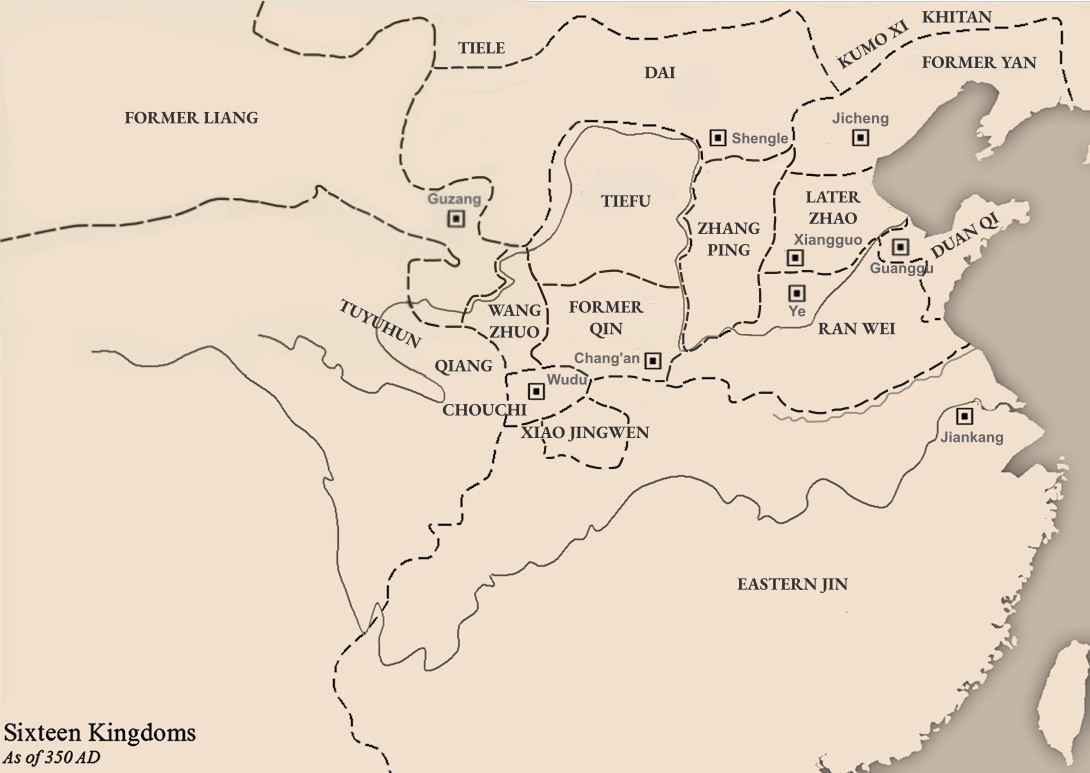
350 – Ran Min Disturbance

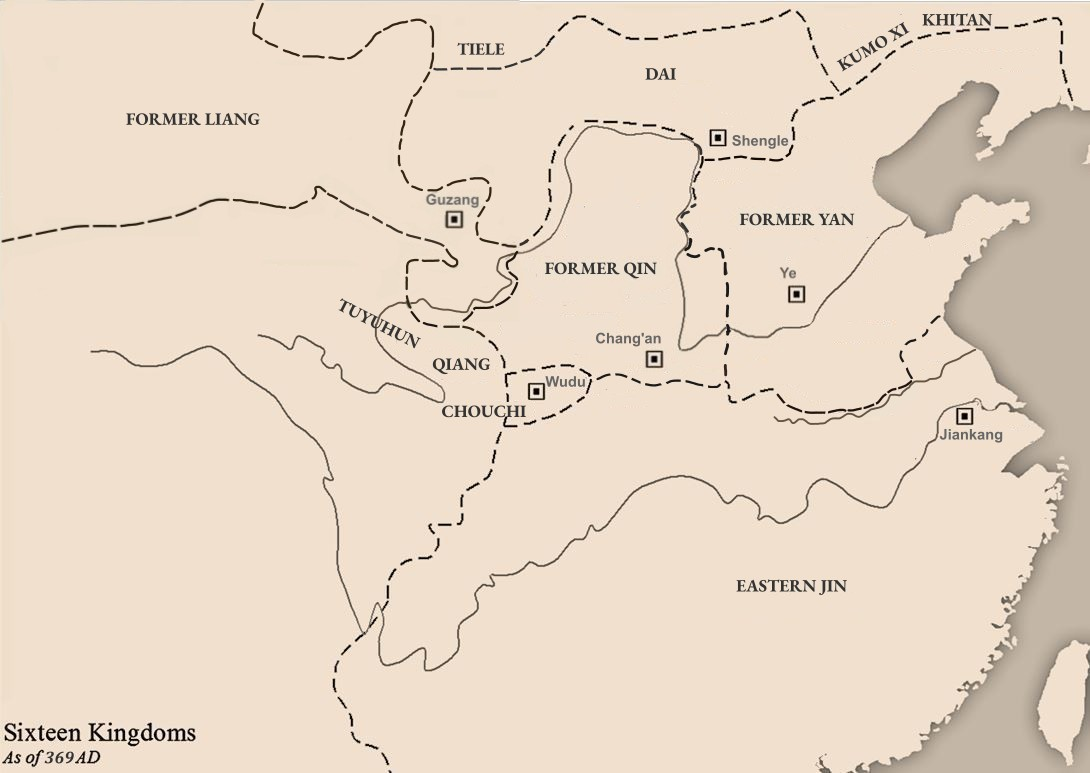
369 – Former Qin–Former Yan confrontation

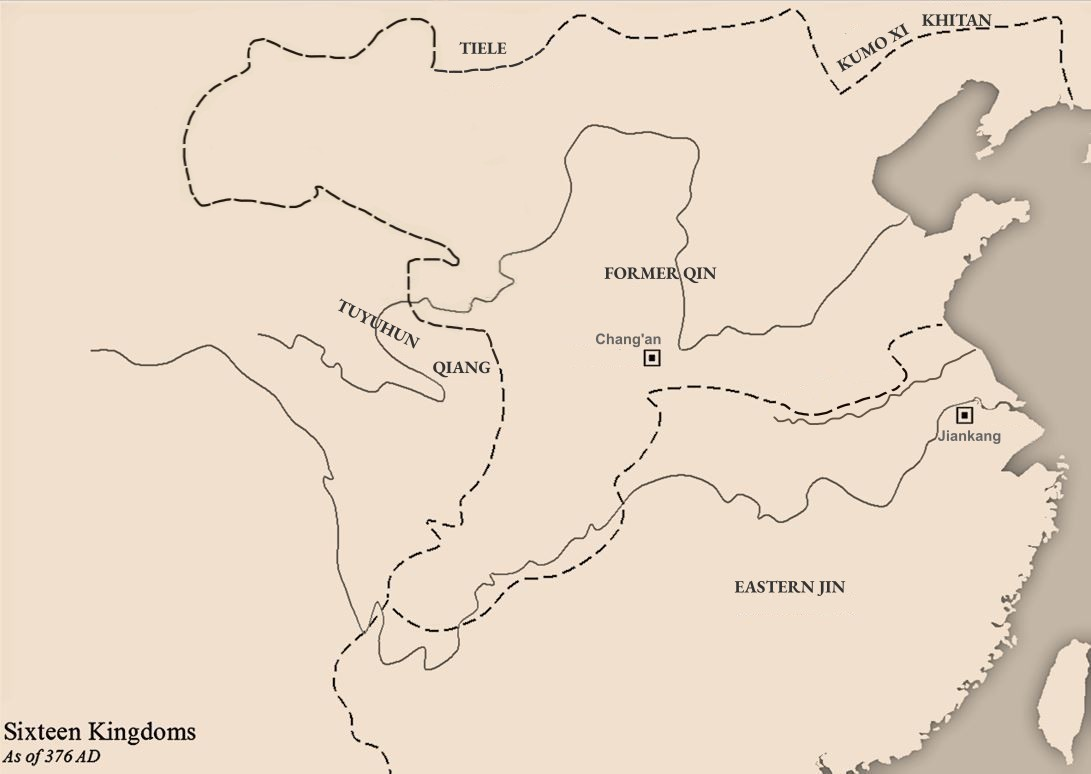
376 – Former Qin reunification of northern China

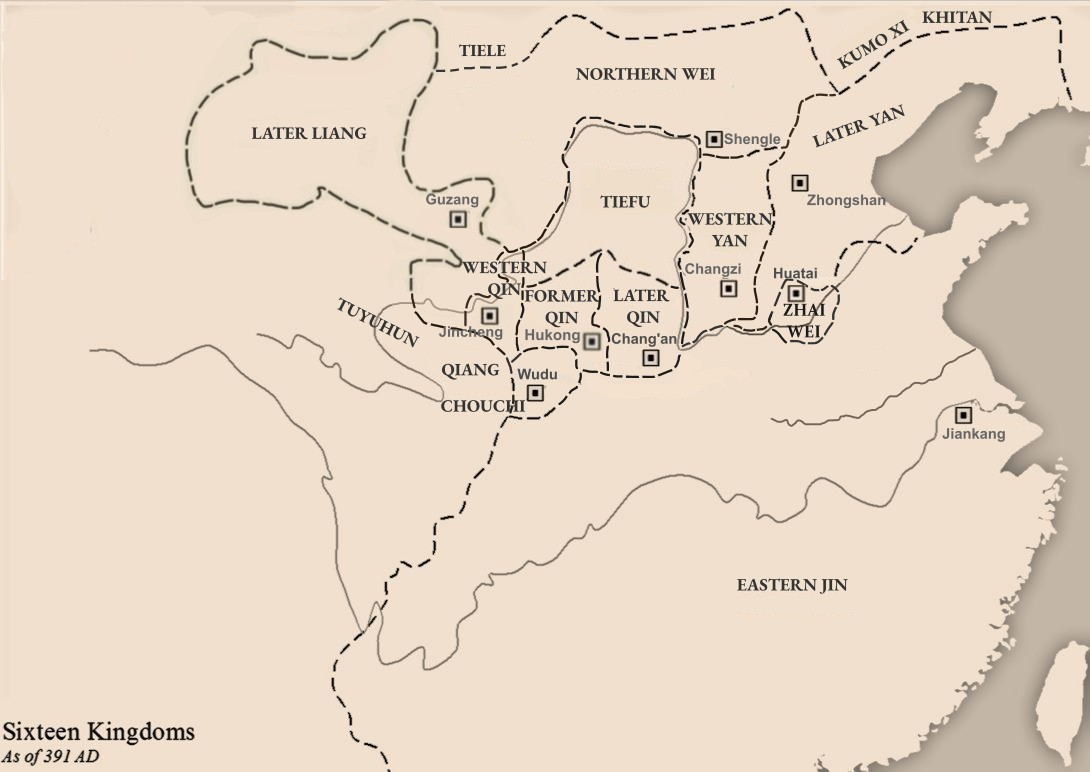
391 – Aftermath of the Battle of Fei River

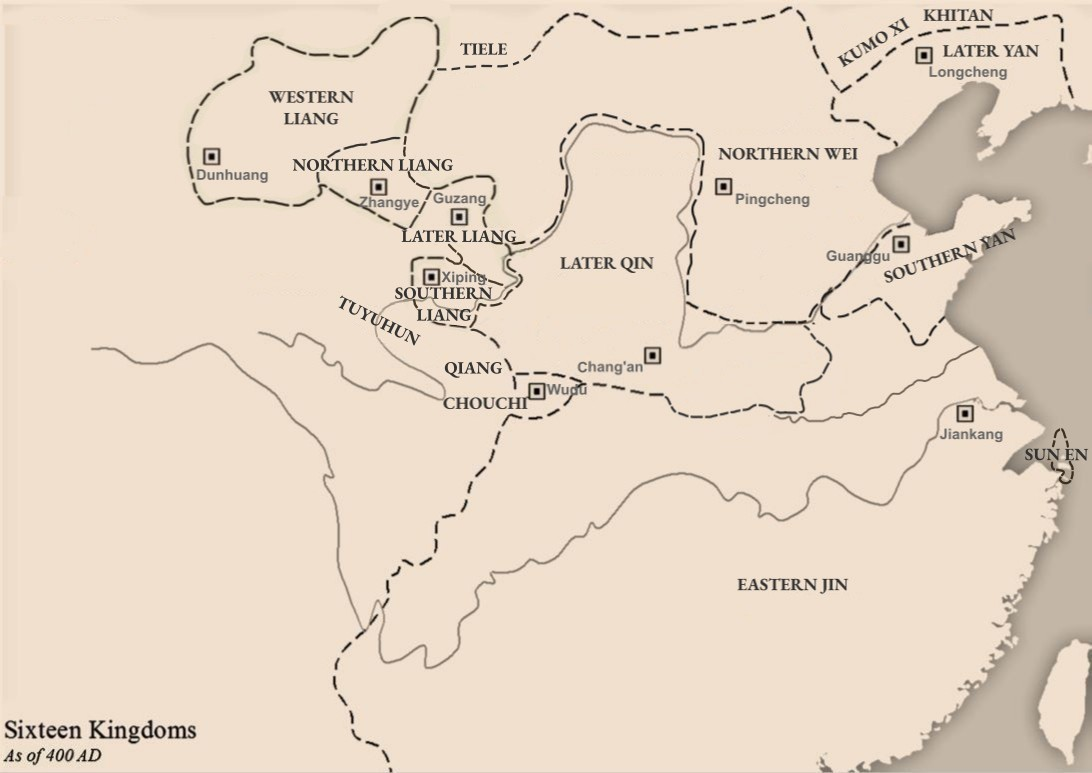
400 – Later Qin–Northern Wei confrontation

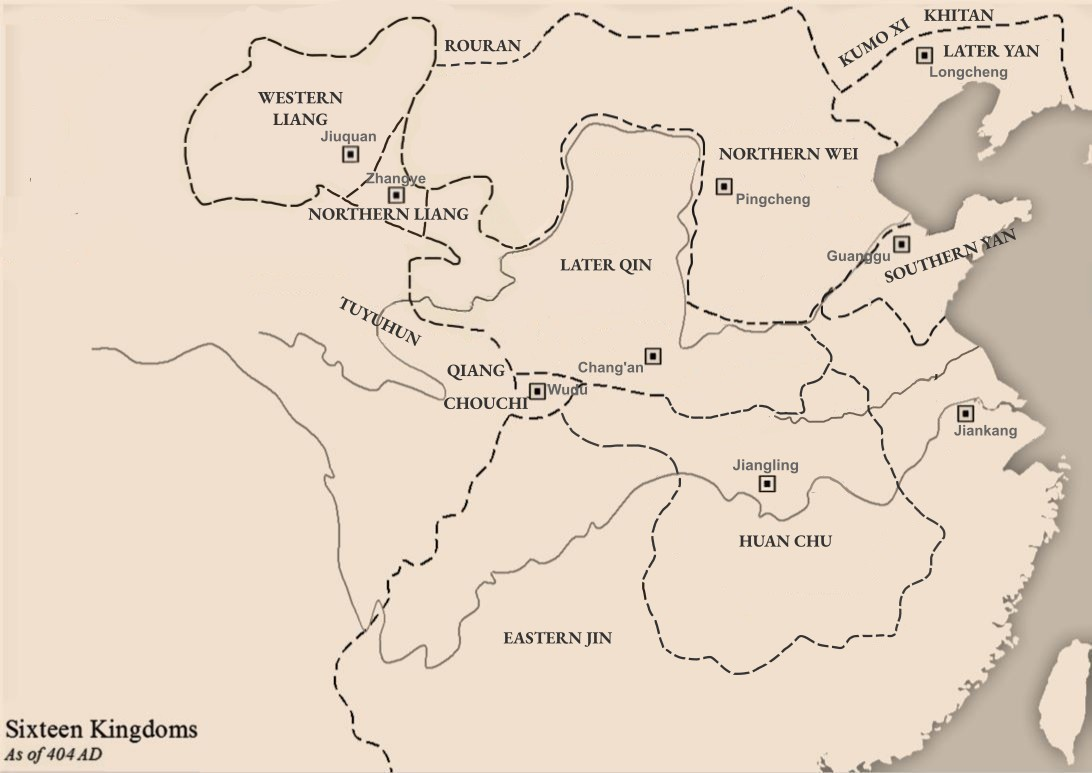
404 – Campaign against Huan Chu

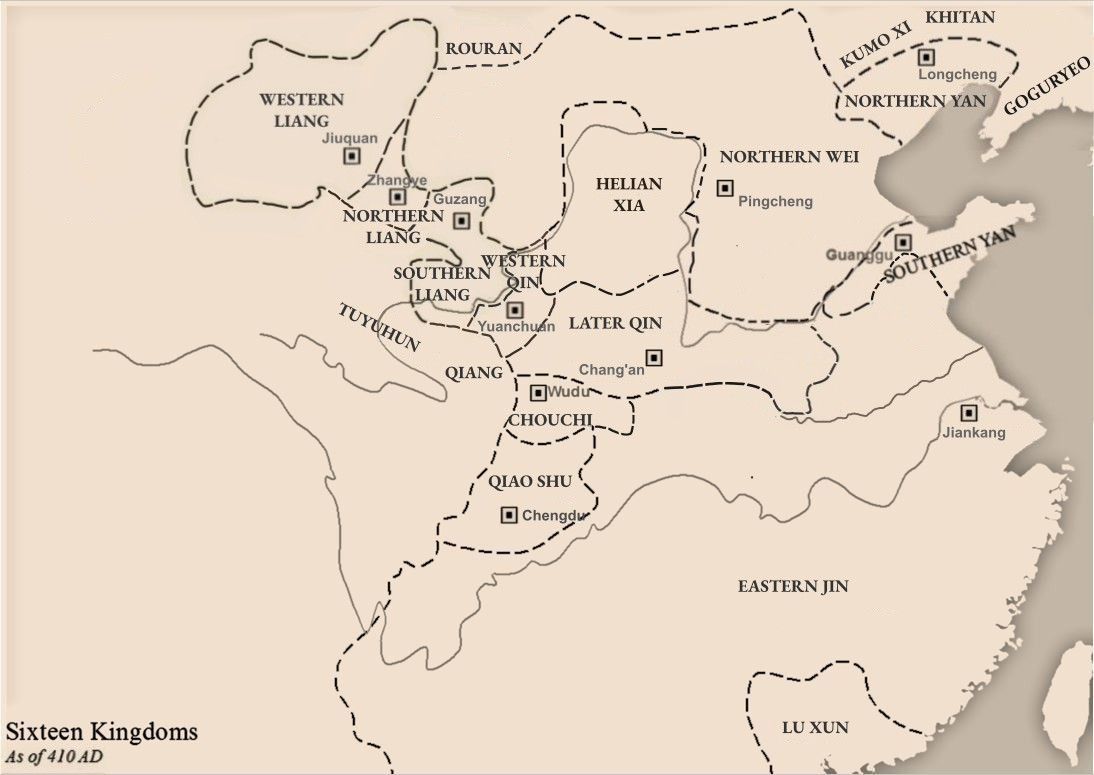
410 – Decline of Later Qin

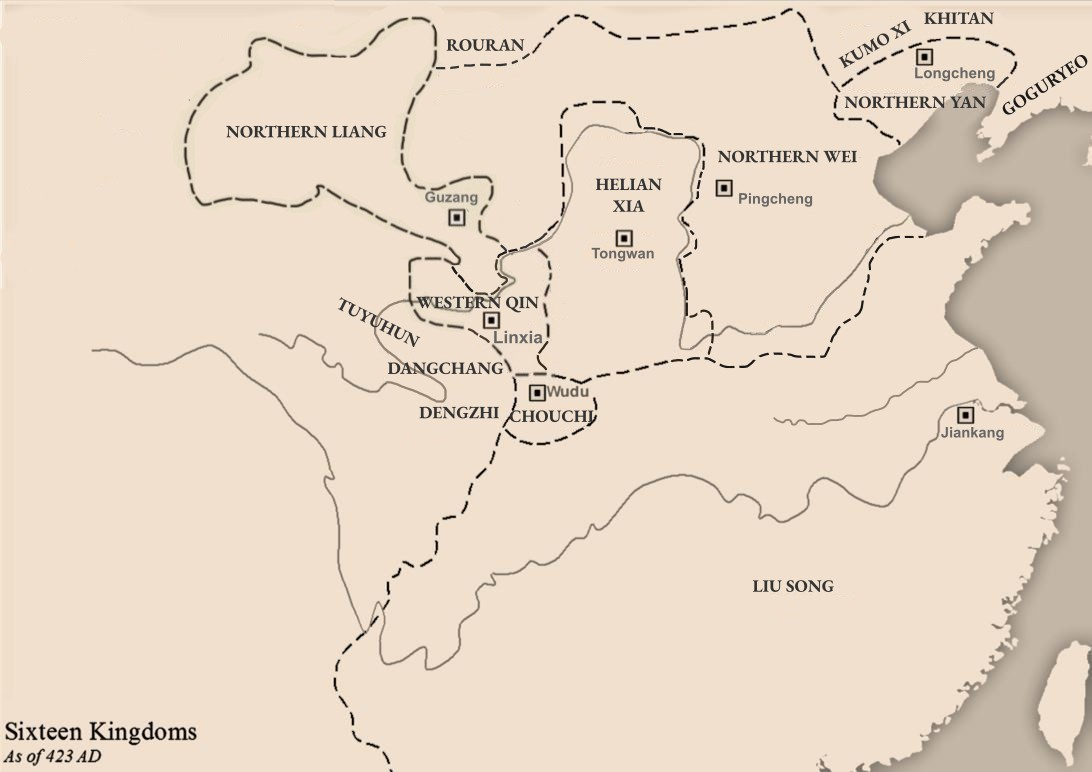
423 – Northern Wei–Helian Xia controntation

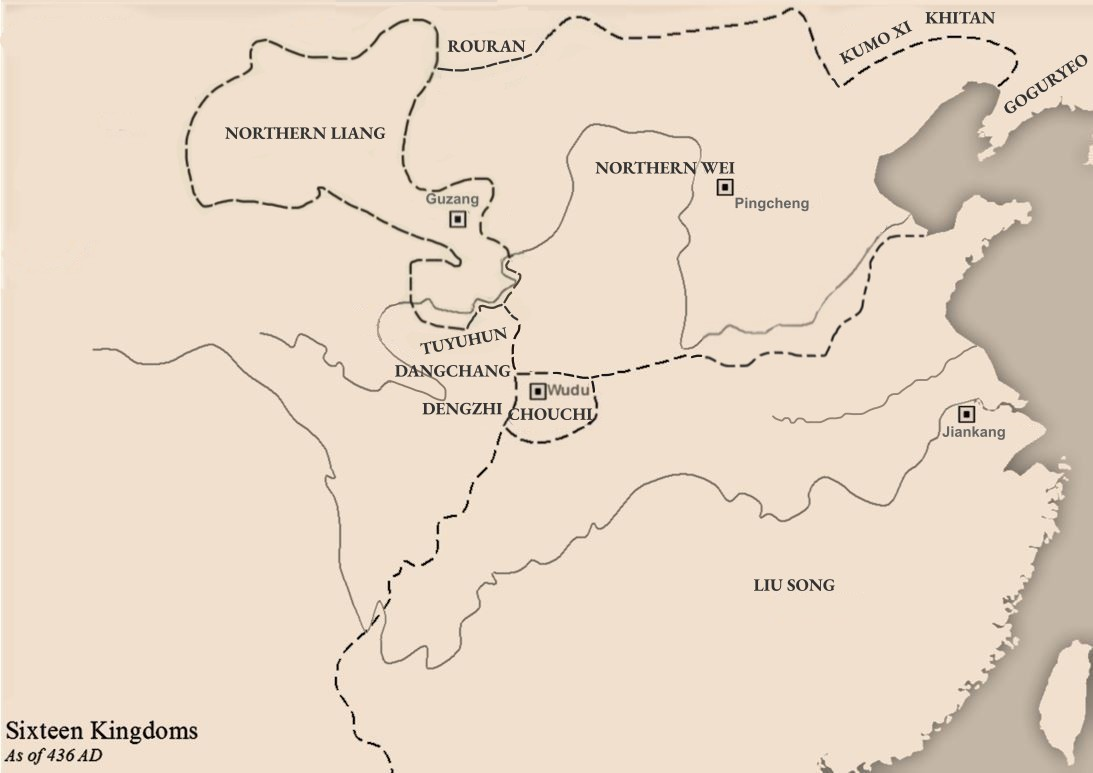
436 – End of the Sixteen Kingdoms

== Chronology ==
**Chronology of the Sixteen Kingdoms with Ethnicity of Founders**
Xianbei Xiongnu Jie Di Qiang Dingling Han Chinese
303	Jin Dynasty's rule over northern China and Sichuan begins to break down in 304	WESTERN; JIN DYNASTY*; 266-317
304	**Cheng-Han**; 304-47	**Han-Zhao**; 304-29
314
315	Dai*; 315-76
317
318	Former Liang; 318-76	EASTERN; JIN DYNASTY*; 318-420
319	**Later Zhao**; 319-51
329
330
337	**Former Yan**; 337-70
347
350	Ran Wei*; 350-52
351	**Former Qin**; 351-94
352
353
370
376
377	From 376 to 383, Former Qin briefly unites northern China
384	NORTHERN; WEI DYNASTY*; 386-534	**Later Qin**; 384-417	Western Yan*; 384-94	**Later Yan**; 384-409
385	Western Qin; 385-400
386	Later Liang; 386-403
388	Zhai Wei*; 388-92
392
394
397	Southern Liang; 397-414	Northern Liang; 397-439
398	Southern Yan; 398-410
400	Western Liang; 400-21
403
404
407	**Xia**; 407-31
409	Western Qin resurrected 409-31	Northern Yan; 409-36
410
414
417
420	LIU; SONG DYNASTY*; 420-79
421
431
436
439
440	In 439, the Northern Wei reunites northern China
asterisk (*) denotes kingdoms not counted among the sixteen in the Spring and Autumn Annals of the Sixteen Kingdoms **bold** denotes major kingdoms among the sixteen with large jurisdiction and their rulers elevated themselves as emperors

== Governance ==
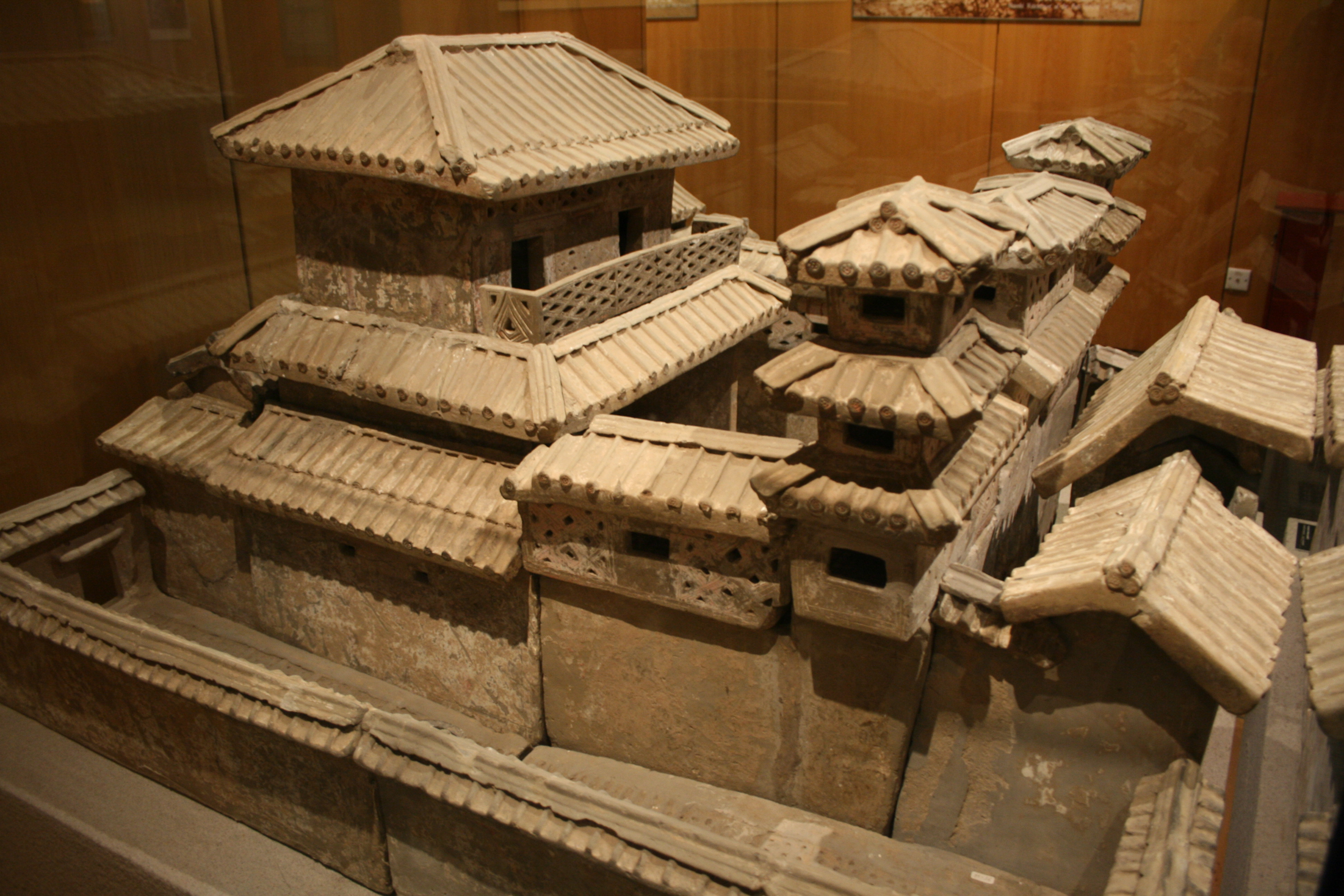
A pottery model of a fortified manor from the Eastern Han dynasty. While the existence of these manors began during the Han period, they saw a resurgence during the Sixteen Kingdoms as peasants looked to defend themselves from raiding parties.

Through generational exposure and cooperation with the ethnic Han scholar gentry, the Sixteen Kingdoms heavily adopted the Chinese style of imperial governance and customs. Many of their rulers claimed the imperial titles of Emperor (帝; Dì) or King (王; Wáng), used era names and appointed their followers to official positions from the imperial Chinese system such as Grand Chancellor (丞相; Chéngxiàng) and Grand Tutor (太傅; Tàifù). Additionally, the imperial title of Heavenly King (天王; Tiānwáng) was introduced and widely used during this period as a way for rulers to acknowledge that they still lack the prerequisites of an Emperor while effectively acting as one.

Many of the Sixteen Kingdoms also upheld separate governance between the Han and non-Chinese. During the Han-Zhao period, Liu Yuan claimed the title of Grand Chanyu, but later deferred the title to his crown prince for him to manage the affairs of the tribes with a status second only to the Emperor. Variations of the Chanyu Office (單于台; Chányú Tái) were implemented by later states like the Later Zhao and Former Qin, either as a permanent or temporary function. The system was even applied by the Chinese-led regimes of Ran Wei and Northern Yan.

While many fled south during the tumultuous collapse of the Western Jin, the many Chinese scholar-officials that remained behind on the Central Plains fortified themselves in their private manors and estates in the countryside. These fortified manors (塢堡; wùbǎo) became safe havens for nearby villagers and fleeing refugees, provided that they swore fealty to the local magnates as armed retainers (部曲; bùqǔ). These retainers mainly worked as serfs and tended to the fields in times of peace, but when the threat of war arise, they took up arms as soldiers and defended their estates. Some manors were comparable to minor districts, being able to house nearly a thousand households. Due to the influence and prevalence of these manors, non-Han regimes often compromised by recognizing the local magnates as officials in exchange for taxes, supplies and human labour. However, the various magnates still retained a strong degree of autonomy over their holdings, limiting the state's capacity and leading to the issue of "hidden households" (蔭戶; yīnhù), in which populations were regularly kept hidden from the national registry to work in private estates. The wubaos persisted throughout the Sixteen Kingdoms period all the way to mid-Northern Wei period in the 5th century, after which they declined under the land reforms of Empress Dowager Feng.

== Involvement of other ethnicities ==
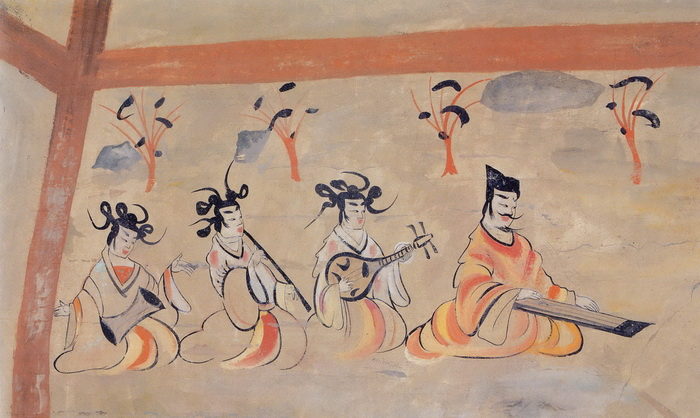
A mural painting showing a leisurely life scene from the Dingjiazha Tomb No. 5 of the Later Liang – Northern Liang period (384-441) in modern Jiuquan, Gansu.

The Goguryeo kingdom was a powerful and influential state in northern Korea and parts of northeastern China at the beginning of the Sixteen Kingdoms period. With the arrival of the Murong and the collapse of centralized authority in northern China, Goguryeo clashed on several instances with the Xianbei clan and their states in a century-long conflict. In 342, Former Yan captured and sacked the capital of Hwando, forcing Goguryeo into submission. After the fall of Former Yan, Goguryeo established friendly relations with the Former Qin, who introduced them to Buddhism through the monk Sundo in 372. Their feud with the Murong was reignited following the restoration of the Later Yan in 384. Under the dynamic leadership of King Gwanggaeto the Great, Goguryeo repeatedly defeated the Later Yan and conquered Liaodong in 404. Peace along the Goguryeo-Yan borders was finally attained in 407 with the founding of Northern Yan, as Gwanggaeto recognized their first ruler, Gao Yun, as a distant member of the Goguryeo imperial clan. Gwanggaeto and his son, King Jangsu, maintained relations with Northern Yan even after Chinese Feng clan succeeded Gao Yun. When Northern Yan fell in 436, Jangsu granted asylum to their last Heavenly King, Feng Hong, but as Feng was said to have acted insubordinately and demanded royal courtesy, Jangsu later had him executed.

After the Yuwen Xianbei tribe was defeated by the Former Yan in 344, the Kumo Xi and Khitan branches of the tribe survived and began increasing in strength north of You province. In 414, the Kumo Xi tribes sent a trade caravan to Northern Yan, then joined with the Khitan in declaring allegiance to Northern Yan, and then to Northern Wei after its destruction of Northern Yan. Thus, the Northern Wei held de facto rule over the entire Mongolian Plateau and the Liao River region.

In the Western Regions (modern Xinjiang) of the former Han Empire lay the kingdoms of Shanshan, Qiuzi, Yutian, Dongshi, and Shule. These kingdoms were often controlled or influenced by the various Liang kingdoms that existed during the Sixteen Kingdoms period. The Former Liang organized Gaochang Commandery (Chinese: 高昌郡) and Tiandi County (Chinese: 闐地縣) in the west, both under the administration of the Gaochang Governor. Day-to-day administration was run out of several forts: Western Regions Chief Clerk, Wu and Ji Colonel, and Jade Gate Commissioner of the Army. Other Liangzhou states generally followed this administrative system. In 382, the Former Qin ruler Fu Jiān sent General Lü Guang on a military expedition to the Dayuan kingdom and promoted him to Protector General of the western border regions. After Qin collapsed and Lü Guang founded the Later Liang, the western border forts and the Shanshan kingdom all became parts of or vassals to the Later Liang

== Religion ==
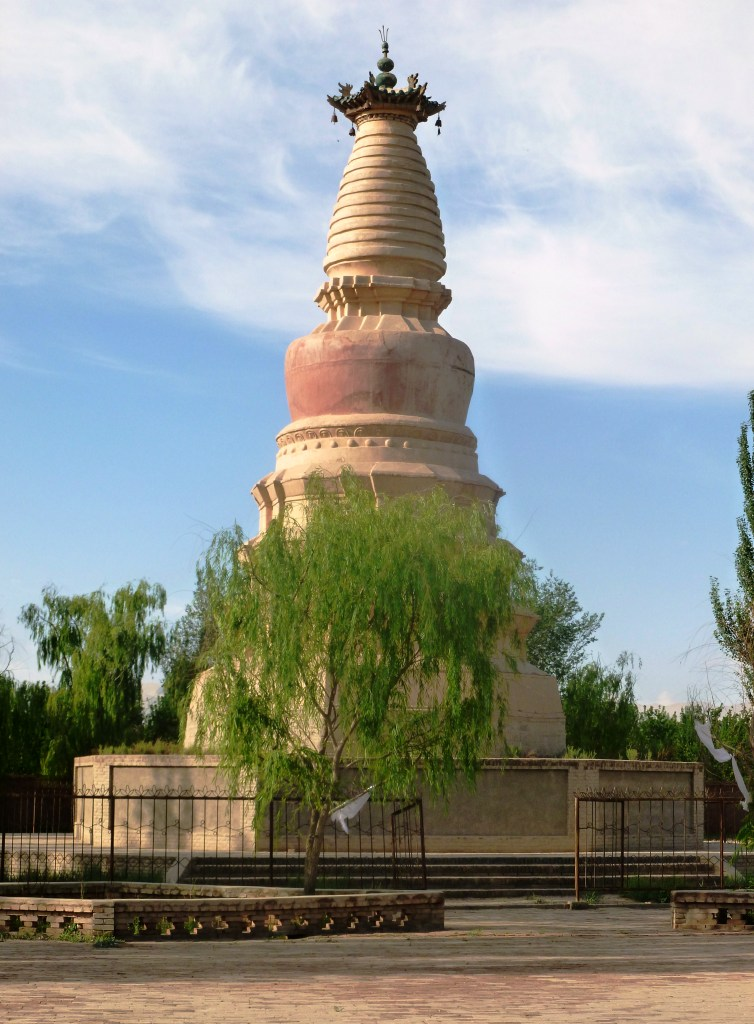
The White Horse Pagoda, Dunhuang, commemorating Kumarajiva's white horse which carried the scriptures to China, c. 384.

Though Buddhism first arrived in China in the 1st-century CE, the religion only began receiving mainstream recognition and popularity during the Sixteen Kingdoms period. Several rulers of the northern kingdoms patronized Buddhism which spread across northern China during the Sixteen Kingdoms and flourished during the subsequent Northern Dynasties. The Later Zhao was one of the earliest regimes in China to provide Buddhism with statewide backing. Monks such as Fotu Cheng and Dharmakṣema all occupied high-ranking positions in their governments and were allowed to spread their teachings to the masses.

During the Former Qin, Fu Jiān was a strong patron of Buddhist scholarship. After capturing Xiangyang in 379, he invited the monk Dao An to Chang'an to catalogue Buddhist scriptures. When the teachings of the famed Kuchean monk, Kumārajīva, reached Chang'an, Dao An advised Fu Jiān to invite the Kumārajīva. In 382, Fu Jiān sent general Lü Guang to conquer the Western Regions (Tarim Basin) and bring Kumārajīva to Chang'an. Lü Guang captured Kucha and seized Kumārajīva, but the Former Qin collapsed after the Battle of Feishui in 383. Lü Guang founded the Later Liang and held Kumārajīva captive in western Gansu for 18 years. In 401, the Later Qin under Yao Xing conquered the Former Liang and Kumārajīva was able to settle in Chang'an and become one of the most influential translators of Buddhist sutras into Chinese. Another monk, Faxian began a pilgrimage from Later Qin territory in 399 to acquire Buddhist texts in India. He returned to China in 412 and resettled at Jiankang under the Eastern Jin, also making great contributions to the translation and accessibility of Buddhist scriptures.

With monks frequently travelling between the Western Regions and China, Buddhist cave arts also began to take root in the Hexi Corridor of modern-day Gansu. The earliest grottoes in the Mogao Caves of Dunhuang were carved in the Former Liang. Later on, work on the Maijishan Grottoes in Tianshui first took place during the Later Qin, while the Bingling Grottoes in Yongjing County were started during the Western Qin. Numerous other grottoes were built in the Hexi under the Northern Liang such as the Tiantishan Caves.

Taoism was absorbed through established Chinese practices and customs, even as Buddhism began to take hold over the north. The Cheng-Han in particular was influenced by the Way of the Celestial Masters, as most of the population of Sichuan, including the ruling Li clan, were followers of the school. A Taoist sage from the sect, Fan Changsheng, was appointed as the state's first Prime Minister and given the title of Grand Preceptor of Heaven and Earth.

== See also ==
- Battle of Fei River
- Ethnic groups in Chinese history
- Family trees of the rulers of the Sixteen Kingdoms
- Five Barbarians
- Upheaval of the Five Barbarians
- Sinicization

Preceded by Western Jin	Dynasties in Chinese history 304–439	Succeeded by Northern Dynasties
