= Ji County =

Ji County or Jixian may refer to the county-level divisions in China:

- Ji County, Shanxi (吉县)
- Jizhou District, Tianjin, formerly Ji County (蓟县)
- Jizhou District, Hengshui, Hebei, formerly Ji County (冀县)
- Weihui, Henan, formerly Ji County (汲县)

== See also ==
- Ji (disambiguation)
- Jixian (disambiguation)
