= Ji =

Ji may refer to:

== Names and titles ==
- Ji (surname), the pinyin romanization of several distinct Chinese surnames
- Ji (Korean name), a Korean surname and a given name (including lists of people with the name)
- -ji, an honorific used as a suffix in many languages of India
- J.I the Prince of N.Y, American rapper J.I.
- Ji (or Hou Ji), the legendary founder of the Zhou dynasty

== Places in China ==
- Jì (冀), pinyin abbreviation for the province of Hebei
- Jí (吉), pinyin abbreviation for the province of Jilin
- Ji (state in modern Beijing), an ancient Chinese state
- Ji (state in modern Shandong)
- Ji (Beijing), an ancient city in present-day Beijing
- Ji County (disambiguation), several places
- Ji Prefecture (Shandong), a prefecture in imperial China
- Ji Province, one of the Nine Provinces of ancient China
- Ji River, either of two former rivers

== Organizations ==
- Jamaat-e-Islami (disambiguation), several organizations
- Jemaah Islamiyah (JI), a Southeast Asian militant Islamist rebel group
- Jurong Institute (JI), a now-defunct pre-university institution in Singapore
- JI, IATA code for Meraj Airlines since 2010
- JI, IATA code for Midway Airlines (1993–2003)
- Ji Hotel, one of brands of H World Group Limited

== Other uses ==
- Ji (film), a 2005 Indian Tamil film starring Ajith Kumar and Trisha
- Ji (monk) (632–682), Chinese monk
- Ji (polearm) (戟), a kind of Chinese polearm
- Ji Koizumi, a character in the anime Guru Guru Pon-chan
- Just intonation, an alternative, and often subordinate to the contemporary Western establishment, tuning concept employed in various musical-compositional procedures and theories
- Joint Implementation (JI), one of the flexibility mechanisms of the Kyoto Protocol
- There are two different kana (Japanese script) letters that are romanized as ji:
  - じ: Shi (し) with dakuten (voicing marks)
  - ぢ: Chi (ち) with dakuten
- Another name for the Chinese hairpin
- , Tsurumi Line, a line operated by the East Japan Railway Company
- JI, Hitahikosan Line, a line operated by the Kyushu Railway Company
- Jī (箕) or Winnowing Basket, a Chinese constellation

== See also ==
- JL (disambiguation)
- Jee (disambiguation)
- Jicheng (disambiguation)
