= JL =

JL or Jl may refer to:

== Businesses and organizations ==
- JL Audio, American manufacturer of consumer audio products
- Japan Airlines, IATA airline designator JL
- Jefferson Lines, an American intercity bus company
- Jonos, originally Jonos, Ltd., a defunct American computer company
- Junkers-Larsen, an aircraft manufacturer
- New Era Party (Latvian: Jaunais laiks), a former political party in Latvia
- Popular Unity (Poland) (Polish: Jedność Ludowa), a 1920s political party

== People ==
- JL Gaspar (born 2004), Filipino singer
- JL Skinner (born 2001), American football player
- Justin Langer (born 1970), Australian cricketer nicknamed JL
- J. H. Leonard (c. 1863 – 1929), Australian newspaper illustrator sometimes signing as JL
- Jerry Lynn (born 1963), former American pro-wrestler with ringname "Mr. J.L."

== Transportation ==
- , local trains on the Jōban Line in Japan
- Jeep Wrangler (JL), an off-road vehicle
- Saviem JL, a series of heavy trucks
- Jalgaon Junction railway station, Maharashtra, India, station code JL

== Other uses ==
- .jl, file extension for Julia (programming language)

== See also ==
- J1 (disambiguation)
- JI (disambiguation)
- LJ (disambiguation)
- Arabic definite article, in Arabic script ال
- Jean-Luc, a given name
- Jones and Laughlin Steel Company, or J&L
- Journal (disambiguation), several entries abbreviated Jl.
- Justice League (disambiguation)
