= Jixian =

Jixian may refer to the following places and jurisdictions in China :

- Jixian County (集贤县), Heilongjiang
- Ji County, Shanxi (吉县), or Jixian
- Ji County, Tianjin (蓟县), or Jixian
- Ji County, Henan (汲县), or Jixian, now Weihui City, and a Catholic diocese
- Jixian Township (集贤乡), Chongzhou, Sichuan

Subdistricts

- Jixian Subdistrict, Shuangyashan (集贤街道), in Sifangtai District, Shuangyashan, Heilongjiang
- Jixian Subdistrict, Shenyang (集贤街道), in Heping District, Shenyang, Liaoning

Towns (集贤镇)

- Jixian, Jixian County, Heilongjiang
- Jixian, Shaanxi, in Zhouzhi County
