= Longcheng District =

Coordinates: 41°35′33″N 120°26′14″E

Longcheng 龙城区
- District
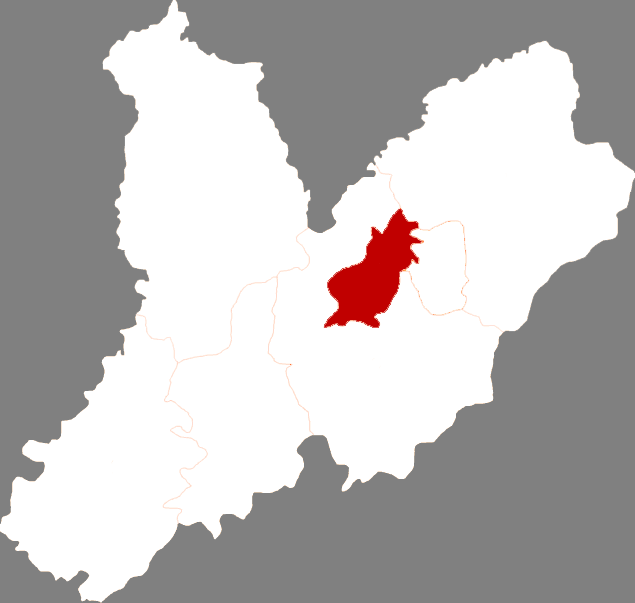
- Location in Chaoyang
- Country: People's Republic of China
- Province: Liaoning
- Prefecture-level city: Chaoyang

Area
  - Total: 618.9 km^{2} (239.0 sq mi)

Population (2020 census)
  - Total: 222,065
  - Density: 358.8/km^{2} (929.3/sq mi)
- Time zone: UTC+8 (China Standard)

Longcheng District (simplified Chinese: 龙城区; traditional Chinese: 龍城區; pinyin: Lóngchéng Qū; lit. 'Dragon City' is a district of Chaoyang City, Liaoning province, People's Republic of China.

== Administrative Divisions ==
There are four subdistricts, four towns, and two townships in the district.

Subdistricts:

- Mashan Subdistrict (马山街道), Xiangyang Subdistrict (向阳街道), Xinhua Subdistrict (新华街道), Banlashan Subdistrict (半拉山街道)

Towns:

- Qidaoquanzi (七道泉子镇), Xidayingzi (西大营子镇), Zhaoduba (召都巴镇), Hedapingfang (和大平房镇)

Townships:

- Bianzhangzi Township (边杖子乡), Helianhe Township (和联合乡)
