= Jicheng =

Jicheng or Ji City may refer to:

- Jicheng (Beijing) (蓟城/薊城), an ancient city now part of Beijing
- Jicheng (棘城), an ancient city now part of Yi County, Liaoning
- Jicheng (冀城), ancient city in western China known for the Siege of Jicheng in the Romance of the Three Kingdoms
- Jicheng, Shanxi (箕城镇), town in Yushe County
- Jicheng Road Subdistrict (祭城路街道), Jinshui District, Zhengzhou, Henan
- Yin–Zhou jinwen jicheng, a compendium of bronze inscriptions
