= Battle of Baisi =

- Part of Sixteen Kingdoms and Northern and Southern dynasties
Date	23–24 March 397 AD
Location	North of Gaocheng, Hebei
Result	Wei victory

Belligerents
Northern Wei	Later Yan

Commanders and leaders
Tuoba Gui	Murong Bao

Strength
Unknown	167,000

Casualties and losses
Unknown	Heavy

Battle of Baisi
- Traditional Chinese: 柏肆之戰
- Simplified Chinese: 柏肆之战
Transcriptions
Standard Mandarin
- Hanyu Pinyin: Bǎisì zhī zhàn

The Battle of Baisi (simplified Chinese: 柏肆之战; traditional Chinese: 柏肆之戰; pinyin: Bǎisì zhī zhàn) was fought in late March 397 during the Northern Wei invasion of Later Yan during the Sixteen Kingdoms period of China. The battle concluded in victory for Wei and was a turning point in their campaign, as a large portion of the main Yan forces was destroyed, causing rebellions to spring up against the Yan. The Yan emperor, Murong Bao was eventually forced to flee to the Liao River Basin in the northeast, allowing the Wei to take control over the Central Plains.

== Background ==
After the disastrous Battle of Canhe Slope in 395, the Emperor of Later Yan, Murong Chui, launched another punitive expedition against the Northern Wei in April 396. Despite early success, he died of natural causes during the campaign in June, prompting the Yan army to withdraw. That same month at the Yan capital, Zhongshan (中山, in modern Baoding, Hebei), his crown prince, Murong Bao was ascended the throne, but his rule quickly proved unpopular among his subjects; he began a succession crisis by giving the role of crown prince to his younger son rather than his eldest son, Murong Hui, and his attempt at rectifying the household registry was negatively received by the nobility and common people.

In the following months, Murong Bao's brother, Murong Nong was transferred to guard Bing province. The region was suffering from a famine, as the grain stores were short on supply and there was a severe winter drought. Nong also had the various tribes in Bing placed under the command of his own generals, further deepening the resentment of the local populace towards the Yan administration. Thus, they secretly invited the Northern Wei to claim their territory.

== Prelude ==
=== Fall of Bing province ===
On 16 October, the Emperor of Wei, Tuoba Gui set out from Mayi (馬邑; in present-day Shuozhou, Shanxi) and crossed Gouzhu (句注, northwest of present-day Dai County, Shanxi) with 400,000 soldiers to conquer Bing. He also sent a force through Jundu (軍都; southwest of modern day Changping, Beijing) to carry out a surprise attack on You province. On 4 November, Tuoba Gui arrived at Yangqu and proceeded to the provincial capital, Jinyang. The Wei army surrounded the city, and when Murong Nong sallied out to fight them, he was greatly routed. Nong was then locked out of his city by his general and forced to flee to Zhongshan. Within the span of two days, Tuoba Gui had conquered the whole province.

=== First attack on Zhongshan ===
When Murong Bao heard that Tuoba Gui was approaching, he held a council in his court to discuss strategy. After listening to their suggestions, he decided to gather all his grain and hole up his forces in Zhongshan, hoping that the Wei army would eventually withdraw as they overstretch their supply lines. Murong Nong was sent out to camp at Anxi (安喜; east of present-day Dingzhou, Hebei), while another brother, Murong Lin was placed in charge of all military affairs.

On 1 December, Tuoba Gui marched from Jingxing towards Zhongshan, with 50,000 cavalry leading the vanguard. He conquered Changshan along the way, and from there, he marched eastwards and received the submissions of other Yan commanderies and counties. On the Central Plain, only the cities of Zhongshan, Ye and Xindu remained under Yan control. Tuoba Gui led his forces to Zhongshan while sending his cousin, Tuoba Yi with 50,000 cavalry to attack Ye and his generals, Wang Jian and Li Li to attack Xindu.

On 3 January 397, Tuoba Gui's army arrived at Zhongshan, and the next day, they attacked the city. However, they suffered heavy losses while fighting the Yan general Murong Long and stopped their assault. Reconsidering his strategy, Tuoba Gui decided to march south to Lukou and concentrate his effort on Ye and Xindu. In the north, a Wei detachment attempted to capture Ji from Yan but was defeated and withdrew to Yuyang.

=== Assault on Ye and Xindu ===
At Ye, the defenders led by Murong De defeated the Wei army sent to attack them and forced them back to Xincheng (新城; in present-day Handan, Hebei). Tuoba Yi received reinforcements from Tuoba Gui's uncle, He Lailu, who brought with him 20,000 cavalry while Murong De fortified his city and requested the Later Qin for aid, though none would come. There was animosity between He Lailu and Tuoba Yi, as the former felt that he should not be receiving orders from the Tuoba. Meanwhile, Yi's marshal, Ding Jian (丁建), was secretly in contact with Murong De and fired an arrow with a letter into Ye revealing the situation in the Wei camps. On a hazy day on 18 February, a fire broke out in Lailu's camp, and Ding Jian convinced Yi that a mutiny had broken out. Yi withdrew, and Lailu followed suit. Ding Jian then surrendered to Murong De and informed him about their withdrawal. De sent out his generals with 7,000 to pursue them, and the Wei army was greatly routed.

Wang Jian also struggled at Xindu; after 60 days of siege, he was unable to capture the city, with many of his soldiers and officers dying in battle. On 6 March, Tuoba Gui personally went over with his army and captured it on 9 March. When Murong Bao heard that Tuoba Gui had gone to Xindu, he decided to march out with his army, camping at Shenze County and recruiting the local bandit groups for battle.

== The battle ==
Back in Wei territory, a rebellion broke out led by Chouti (醜提), whose uncle, Meigen (沒根) had earlier defected to Yan. On 15 March, Tuoba Gui went to Yangcheng (楊城; in present-day Yi County, Hebei), where he sent an envoy to Murong Bao negotiating peace so that he could return and deal with the rebellion. Murong Bao rejected his offer; instead, he brought 120,000 infantry and 37,000 cavalry at Baisi (柏肆) in Quyang county, setting camp north of the Hutuo river to intercept Tuoba Gui. On 23 March, the Wei army arrived and encamped south of the river.

That night, Murong Bao secretly crossed the river with his soldiers and recruited 10,000 volunteers. These volunteers, led by Murong Long carried out a surprise attack on the Wei encampment while Bao waited in the north to support them. The attackers took advantage of the wind and set fire to the camps, sending the Wei army into panic and Tuoba Gui fleeing barefooted out of his camp. When the Yan soldiers searched his tent, they only found his clothes and boots.

However, for unknown reasons, the volunteers suddenly began attacking each other amidst the chaos. When Tuoba Gui saw what was unfolding, he beat the drums and regrouped his forces by handing out torches to his soldiers. In an unorthodox formation, his cavalry charged into the camps and greatly routed the attackers. The survivors fled to Murong Bao, who then crossed north of the Hutuo.

On 24 March, Tuoba Gui reorganized his entire army and maintained a stalemate with the Yan army. With morale sapping, Murong Bao decided to withdraw back to Zhongshan, but as he did, the Wei army chased after them and defeated them several times. He abandoned his main army and fled to Zhongshan with only 20,000 cavalry. The weather at the time was abnormally cold, and many of the Yan soldiers froze to death in their retreat. Fearing that the Wei army would catch up with them, they also abandoned a large amount of the military supplies and weapons. Many Yan ministers and generals were either captured or surrendered to Tuoba Gui.

== Aftermath ==
=== Flight of Murong Bao ===
Despite the victory at Baisi, there were Wei deserters from the battle who returned to their territory and spread rumours that Tuoba Gui had been defeated. More rebellions broke out in Jinyang and Yinguan, but in the end, they were all swiftly put down and Tuoba Gui resumed his siege on Zhongshan. On 25 March, a Yan official made an attempt on Murong Bao's life to install Murong Lin as the new emperor, but failed. Nonetheless, when Murong Long wanted to lead soldiers out to fight on multiple occasions, Bao hesitated due to Lin's interventions. On 24 April, he negotiated peace with Wei, but after agreeing, he regretted the decision and recanted, so on 26 April, Tuoba Gui besieged Zhongshan again.

That night, Murong Lin tried to assassinate Murong Bao, but after he was foiled, he fled and disappeared into the western hills. Murong Bao was worried that Lin was planning to rebel at the old capital of Longcheng. Murong Hui was also supposed to bring reinforcements out from Longcheng to Zhongshan, but he intentionally delayed and only reached Ji in the end. Thus, on 27 April, Murong Bao abandoned Zhongshan with more than 10,000 riders and most of his family members. They moved north to Ji, where Murong Hui was expecting them. There, they defeated a Wei army sent to pursue them, but due to the lingering issue of succession, a short but bloody civil war soon ensued between Murong Bao and Murong Hui.

=== Fall of Zhongshan ===
The inhabitants of Zhongshan acclaimed the Duke of Kaifeng, Murong Xiang as their new leader. The siege went on until 18 June, when Tuoba Gui, low on supplies, decided to gather grains at Hejian commandery and collect taxes from his commanderies. Believing he had repelled the Wei army, Murong Xiang declared himself emperor, but his brief reign was marked with paranoia and cruelty. In July or August, Murong Lin reappeared, so the inhabitants of Zhongshan invited him back in as their leader and assassinated Murong Xiang.

On September 8, in spite of a deadly plague within his army, Tuoba Gui camped at Jiumen county (九門; northwest of present-day Gaocheng, Hebei) and sent his cousin, Tuoba Zun to launch a surprise attack on Zhongshan. By November 5, the city was devastated by a famine, and on that day, Murong Lin marched out with 20,000 followers to Xinshi county. Lin was finally defeated by Tuoba Gui at Yitai (義臺; in present-day Zhengding County, Hebei) on November 15, prompting him to flee south to Ye. Soon, on 25 November, Tuoba Gui received the surrender of Zhongshan.

Murong De held out at Ye, but in January or February 398, he was persuaded to shift his base to Huatai (滑台, in modern Anyang, Henan), leaving the city for the Northern Wei to occupy. At this point, the Wei had conquered a significant portion of the Central Plains. The Later Yan was reduced to areas around modern-day Liaoning, and by the time that infighting had subsided in 401, they were too weak to pose a threat to Wei. At Huatai, Murong De declared himself as emperor of Yan (known as Southern Yan in historiography), but in 399, he and his followers were driven out and forced their way east to Shandong, where they settled down. With the Yan splintered into two, the Northern Wei had established its hegemony over the northeast, challenging the Eastern Jin in the south and the Later Qin in the northwest.

== Sources ==
- Lü, Simian (1948), A History of Jin, Northern and Southern Dynasties 两晋南北朝史, vol. 1, Shanghai: Kaiming Press
- Graff, David (2002), Medieval Chinese Warfare 300-900 (1 ed.), Routledge, ISBN 9780415239554
- Wei, Shou, Book of Wei (Wei Shu)
- Fang, Xuanling, Book of Jin (Jin Shu)
- Sima, Guang, Zizhi Tongjian
