= Murong Lin =

Chinese general and prince

Murong Lin (Chinese: 慕容麟; died 398), alternatively named Helin (賀驎), was a general and imperial prince of the Xianbei-led Later Yan dynasty of China. He was a son of the founding emperor Murong Chui (Emperor Wucheng) and a brother of Murong Bao (Emperor Huimin). For a while, he was a pretender to the Later Yan throne. He was known both for his abilities and his treachery, and he betrayed both his father and his brothers Murong Ling (慕容令) and Murong Bao on separate occasions. Eventually, he was executed by his uncle Murong De (Emperor Xianwu), the founder of the Southern Yan dynasty.

== Before Later Yan's founding ==
The first reference to Murong Lin in history was in 369, when Murong Chui, then a Former Yan prince, fled to Former Qin after he came after suspicion of the emperor Murong Wei's mother Empress Dowager Kezuhun and the regent Murong Ping. Previously, Murong Chui's plan was to flee to the old capital Longcheng (龍城, in modern Jinzhou, Liaoning) and occupy it, and then seek reconciliation with Empress Dowager Kezuhun, but on the way, Murong Lin, who was then unfavored by Murong Chui, fled back to the capital Yecheng (鄴城, in modern Handan, Hebei) and revealed his father's plans, forcing his father to readjust his plan and flee to Former Qin instead.

For his treachery, however, Murong Lin appeared to be not appreciated by Empress Kezuhun, and he appeared to have been exiled to Longcheng as a soldier under the command of his cousin Murong Liang (慕容亮) the Prince of Bohai—or possibly to the even more remote Shacheng (沙城), described to be 300 kilometers northeast of Longcheng. In 370, after Murong Ling had been tricked by the Former Qin prime minister Wang Meng into defecting back to Former Yan, Murong Ling was exiled to Shacheng, and he started a rebellion with fellow exiles, planning to seize Longcheng, but Murong Lin revealed his plan to Murong Liang, who then prepared for the attack. Murong Ling's subordinate She Gui (渉圭) then rose against him and killed him.

As a result of Murong Lin's treachery, after Former Qin conquered Former Yan later in 370, and Murong Chui accompanied the Former Qin emperor Fu Jiān in entering Yecheng, Murong Chui put Murong Lin's mother to death, but did not have the heart to execute Murong Lin as well, but only expelled him from the household and ordered him to live elsewhere. However, in late 383 and 384, as Murong Chui rose against Former Qin following Fu Jiān's defeat at the Battle of Fei River at the hand of Jin troops, Murong Lin offered many useful strategies to his father, and his father changed his view of Murong Lin, favoring him as much as other sons.

== During Murong Chui's reign ==
After Murong Chui officially declared independence and established Later Yan later in 384, Murong Lin served as one of his generals in campaigns against Former Qin remnants, semi-independent warlords, and other states. He appeared to be effective in these campaigns. In 386, Murong Chui created him the Prince of Zhao. In 386-387 and 390-391, he commanded armies to, in conjunction with the Later Yan vassal Northern Wei's prince Tuoba Gui, fight the Xiongnu chieftain Liu Xian (劉顯) and later other rebels that threatened Tuoba Gui's safety. It was in 391 when he saw Tuoba Gui's abilities, and he recommended to Murong Chui to force Tuoba Gui to take up residence at the Later Yan capital Zhongshan (中山, in modern Baoding, Hebei) and entrust Northern Wei to a brother. Murong Chui refused.

After Tuoba Gui renounced his allegiance to Later Yan (following Later Yan's seizure of his brother Tuoba Gu (拓跋觚) over a dispute of whether Northern Wei should offer horses as tributes) in 391, he began to harass Later Yan borders, and in 395, Murong Chui sent his crown prince Murong Bao to lead an expedition, with Murong Lin and Murong Nong the Prince of Liaoxi as his assistant commanders. However, during the campaign, as Later Yan and Northern Wei armies stalemated across the Yellow River near the Northern Wei capital Shengle (盛樂, in modern Hohhot, Inner Mongolia), Tuoba Gui spread false rumors that Murong Chui was dead, and Murong Lin's subordinates Muyu Song (慕輿嵩) tried to start a coup to overthrow Murong Bao and make Murong Lin emperor, but was discovered and killed. This led to friction between the brothers, and the Later Yan forces withdrew. Murong Bao left Murong Lin to be rear guard against a Northern Wei attack, but Murong Lin did not take Tuoba Gui seriously and therefore did not look for Northern Wei troops, and Tuoba Gui intercepted Murong Bao's main forces at Canhe Slope and annihilated most of the troops, leading to further ambition by Tuoba Gui to eventually conquer Later Yan. In 396, Murong Chui personally led a campaign against Northern Wei that had initial successes, but as the army passed through Canhe Slope, they mourned in such a great manner that Murong Chui, in shame and anger, grew ill, and the army was forced to retreat. He died soon thereafter and was succeeded by Murong Bao.

== During Murong Bao's reign ==
Despite the suspicions that they might have had of each other prior to the defeat at Canhe Slope, Murong Bao and Murong Lin reconciled, and Murong Lin was initially one of Murong Bao's most trusted generals. After Tuoba Gui defeated Murong Nong and seized Bing Province (并州, modern central and northern Shanxi), he headed for Zhongshan, and Murong Bao put Murong Lin in charge of Zhongshan's defenses. Murong Lin advocated defending the city and not engaging Northern Wei forces, much to Murong Nong and Murong Long's frustration.

In spring 397, however, as Zhongshan remained under siege by Northern Wei forces, Murong Lin tried to start a coup inside the city to overthrow Murong Bao. After his attempt failed, he fled out of Zhongshan and took up post in the Taihang Mountains. Apprehensive that Murong Lin might seize relief forces commanded by Murong Hui the Prince of Qinghe, Murong Bao abandoned Zhongshan. The people of Zhongshan initially supported Murong Xiang the Duke of Kaifeng as their leader to continue resisting Northern Wei. In summer 397, Murong Xiang claimed imperial title, but drew the anger of the people because he, apprehensive of Northern Wei forces (which had by then lifted siege on Zhongshan but had remained in the vicinity), refused to let the citizens, under a severe famine, to forage food outside the city, and was cruel in his rule. Murong Lin made a surprise attack on Zhongshan, whose gates were opened for him, and he arrested and killed Murong Xiang. Murong Lin then himself claimed imperial title and permitted the people to forage food—but then, failed to take the opportunity after enough food was gathered to engage Northern Wei forces, and eventually, as wild food dwindled, Northern Wei forces defeated him and captured Zhongshan. He fled to Yecheng to the protection of his uncle Murong De the Prince of Fanyang (and no longer mentioned his imperial claims).

Murong Lin advised Murong De that Yecheng was too large of a city to defend, and that he should consider abandoning it and taking up position at Huatai (滑台, in modern Anyang, Henan) south of the Yellow River. Murong De agreed and abandoned Yecheng, taking up residence at Huatai. Then, Murong Lin offered imperial title to Murong De, who did not take such title but assumed imperial powers under the title Prince of Yan, thus establishing Southern Yan. He made Murong Lin a key general, but Murong Lin then planned another rebellion, and Murong De executed him.
