= Princess Duan =

Princess Duan is the name of:

- Princess Duan (Murong Chui's wife) (died 358), first wife of the Former Yan general Murong Chui
- Princess Duan (Murong Huang's wife), wife of the Chinese/Xianbei state Former Yan founder Murong Huang

== See also ==
- Empress Duan (disambiguation)
