= 358 =

358 in various calendars
Gregorian calendar	358; CCCLVIII
Ab urbe condita	1111
Assyrian calendar	5108
Balinese saka calendar	279–280
Bengali calendar	−236 – −235
Berber calendar	1308
Buddhist calendar	902
Burmese calendar	−280
Byzantine calendar	5866–5867
Chinese calendar	丁巳年 (Fire Snake); 3055 or 2848 — to — 戊午年 (Earth Horse); 3056 or 2849
Coptic calendar	74–75
Discordian calendar	1524
Ethiopian calendar	350–351
Hebrew calendar	4118–4119
- Hindu calendars
Vikram Samvat	414–415
Shaka Samvat	279–280
Kali Yuga	3458–3459
Holocene calendar	10358
Iranian calendar	264 BP – 263 BP
Islamic calendar	272 BH – 271 BH
Javanese calendar	240–241
Julian calendar	358; CCCLVIII
Korean calendar	2691
Minguo calendar	1554 before ROC 民前1554年
Nanakshahi calendar	−1110
Seleucid era	669/670 AG
Thai solar calendar	900–901
Tibetan calendar	阴火蛇年 (female Fire-Snake); 484 or 103 or −669 — to — 阳土马年 (male Earth-Horse); 485 or 104 or −668

Year 358 (CCCLVIII) was a common year starting on Thursday of the Julian calendar. At the time, it was known as the Year of the Consulship of Datianus and Cerealis (or, less frequently, year 1111 Ab urbe condita). The denomination 358 for this year has been used since the early medieval period, when the Anno Domini calendar era became the prevalent method in Europe for naming years.

== Events ==
=== By place ===
==== Roman Empire ====
- Emperor Constantius II builds new forts to secure upper Mesopotamia. Persia's king Shapur II sends an emissary to Constantinople with gifts and a letter wrapped in white silk. He requests that Constantius return the lands of his ancestors from the Euphrates to the frontier of Macedonia. Constantius tactfully refuses to cede any territories.
- The Salian Franks capitulate to Julian the Apostate in Gaul. He allows them to form a Roman foederati in Toxandria. Frankish settlers are established in areas in the north and the east to help with the defense of the Rhine frontier.
- An invasion of Pannonia by the Quadi and the Sarmates is repulsed by Constantius II.
- August 24 — An earthquake destroys Nicomedia, and damages 150 cities in Macedonia, Asia and Pontus.

=== By topic ===
==== Religion ====
- Constantius II recalls Pope Liberius to Rome, where he receives a joyous welcome from the Christians. Antipope Felix II prudently retires to his estate near Porto (Portugal).
- Eudoxius becomes Patriarch of Antioch.
- The last universally binding decision, of the Great Sanhedrin, establishes a fixed Hebrew calendar.

== Births ==
- Aignan of Orleans, Christian bishop (d. 453)

== Deaths ==
- Duan, Chinese princess and wife of Murong Chui
- Paulinus of Trier, Christian bishop and saint
