= Liezu =

Liezu is an imperial temple name for several Chinese monarchs. It may refer to:

- Liu Bei (161–223), emperor of Shu Han
- Cao Rui (died 239), emperor of Cao Wei
- Murong Jun (319–360), emperor of Former Yan
- Qifu Guoren (died 388), ruler of Western Qin
- Murong Bao (355–398), emperor of Later Yan
- Tufa Wugu (died 399), ruler of Southern Liang
- Emperor Daowu of Northern Wei (371–409)
- Yang Wo (886–908), ruler of Yang Wu
- Li Bian (889–943), emperor of Southern Tang

== See also ==
- Liezong (disambiguation)
