= Murong Xiang =

Chinese duke (unknown–397)

Murong Xiang (Chinese: 慕容詳; died 397), Xianbei name Pulin (普隣), was a duke of China's Xianbei-led Later Yan dynasty during the Sixteen Kingdoms period. In 397, following the withdrawal of Murong Bao (Emperor Huimin) from the capital of Zhongshan (中山, in modern Baoding, Hebei), the people of Zhongshan elected Murong Xiang as their leader to defend themselves during the Northern Wei siege. Murong Xiang held out long enough for Wei to retreat due to supply issues, and soon after he declared himself Emperor of Yan, acting as a pretender to the Yan throne. Depicted as a cruel and paranoid ruler, Murong Xiang's reign only lasted two months before he was assassinated and replaced by his cousin, Murong Lin.

== Background ==
Historical records only identify Murong Xiang as a great-grandson of Murong Huang, who was the founder of Former Yan and the father of Later Yan's founder, Murong Chui. He also had an elder brother named, Murong Qing (慕容青), who was the Prince of Nan'an during Later Yan. Under the Later Yan, Murong Xiang received the peerage of Duke of Kaifeng, and by 396, he was serving as Administrator of Shanggu.

== During Murong Bao's reign ==
In 396, amidst the war between Later Yan and Northern Wei, Wei troops attacked and killed Yan's Administrator of Guangning (廣寧郡; in present-day Zhangjiakou, Hebei), Liu Kangni (劉亢泥). This prompted Murong Xiang to abandon his post and flee for the Yan capital in Zhongshan. In 397, Northern Wei placed Zhongshan with the Emperor of Yan, Murong Bao, under siege. Just as concerning, Murong Bao's brother, Murong Lin, had rebelled and his whereabouts were unknown. Murong Bao was afraid that Murong Lin was making his way to the pivotal city of Longcheng (龍城, in modern Jinzhou, Liaoning). Therefore, Murong Bao abandoned Zhongshan and brought his army to secure Longcheng.

Members of the Murong clan in Zhongshan left the city, all except for Murong Xiang, who had either not completed his preparations to leave by the time they left or had failed to catch up with them. Left with only themselves to fend off the oncoming Wei onslaught, the people of Zhongshan quickly elected Murong Xiang as their leader. Zhongshan was reluctant to surrender to Wei, as they feared Wei would execute them en masse just like they did to the Yan soldiers after the Battle of Canhe Slope two years prior. Under Murong Xiang, the people of Zhongshan put up a strong defence and prevented Wei from breaching the city.

Later, Murong Bao's party, by chance, discovered Murong Lin along the way to Longcheng, causing Murong Lin to flee to Wangdu. However, once Murong Lin was at Wangdu, Murong Xiang sent an army to attack him. Murong Xiang's army captured Murong Lin's wife and children, but Murong Lin himself escaped to the hills. In May 397, Murong Bao defeated his rebellious son, Murong Hui. Murong Hui fled to Zhongshan, but Murong Xiang had him executed.

As the siege of Zhongshan continued, the Wei army's food supply was running low. The Prince of Wei, Tuoba Gui, ordered his general, Tuoba Yi, to lift his siege of Ye and move to Julu to gather grains at Yangcheng (楊城; in present-day Yi County, Hebei). Murong Xiang used this opportunity to launch an attack with 6,000 infantry on the Wei camps. Tuoba Gui instructed his general, Baba Fei, to feign a retreat. As Murong Xiang pursued Baba, Tuoba Gui attacked his rear and routed him. 5,000 of Murong Xiang's men died, while Tuoba Gui captured 700 others, although he soon pardoned and released them.

Previously, Murong Bao had sent a general named Kunuguan Ji (庫傉官驥) to reinforce Murong Xiang. Kunuguan Ji arrived after Murong Xiang's defeat to Tuoba Gui, but instead of helping each other, fighting ensued between Kunuguan Ji and Murong Xiang. Murong Xiang killed Kunuguan Ji and massacred his clan. Murong Xiang also did the same to the Intendant of Zhongshan, Fu Mo (苻謨), and his family.

== Reign ==
In late June 397, Tuoba Gui, unable to fix his supply issue, lifted the siege of Zhongshan to replenish his grains in Hejian. Having repelled the Wei army, Murong Xiang declared himself Emperor of Yan and changed the reign era title of Jianshi (建始). He also handed out imperial offices and appointed the Duke of Xiping, Kezuhun Tan (可足渾潭), as Grand General of Chariots and Cavalry, and Prefect of the Masters of Writing. Earlier, in 391, Tuoba Gui had sent his brother, Tuoba Gu (拓跋觚), as a hostage to Yan. Tuoba Gu remained in Zhongshan when Murong Bao left, but after Murong Xiang became emperor, Murong Xiang executed him to raise morale in the city.

Murong Xiang's reign would only last two months. During his brief reign, Murong Xiang proved to be a cruel and neglectful ruler. Records described him as having an addiction to wine and overly engaging himself in pleasurable activities. Throughout his rule, he indiscriminately executed over 500 people in Zhongshan, including Kezuhun Tan. There was also a famine that struck Zhongshan, and when his people asked him for permission to forage for food outside the city, Murong Xiang denied them. As a result, many perished in the famine.

Desperate for a new leader, the people of Zhongshan looked to Murong Lin, who was in hiding since his last encounter with Murong Xiang. In the autumn of 397, Murong Xiang sent his general, Zhang Xiang (張驤) to collect taxes in Changshan commandery. While Zhang Xiang was there, Murong Lin and his remaining troops blended into Zhang Xiang's men and followed them back to Zhongshan. Murong Lin and his followers secretly entered Zhongshan when the gates were open, and once inside, they captured Murong Xiang and beheaded him. Murong Lin subsequently declared himself Emperor of Yan.

Shortly after Murong Lin's declaration, however, Northern Wei attacked Zhongshan again. In November 397, Zhongshan finally fell to Wei. Murong Xiang had been given a burial after his death. Tuoba Gui, who was reportedly devastated by Tuoba Gu's death, had Murong Xiang dug up and beheaded again.
