= Murong Nong =

Murong Nong (Chinese: 慕容農; died 398), courtesy name Daohou (道厚), childhood nickname Enu (惡奴), posthumous name Prince Huanlie of Liaoxi (遼西桓烈王), was a general and imperial prince of China's Xianbei-led Later Yan dynasty. He was a son of the founding emperor Murong Chui (Emperor Wucheng) and a brother of Murong Bao (Emperor Huimin). Throughout most of the state's history, he was admired by the people and officials alike for his military and governance abilities, but his inexplicable failures in 398 contributed to the downfall of the Later Yan dynasty.

== Before Later Yan's founding ==
The first reference to Murong Nong in history was in 369, when Murong Chui, then a Former Yan prince, fled to Former Qin after he came after suspicion of the emperor Murong Wei's mother Empress Dowager Kezuhun and the regent Murong Ping; Murong Nong was one of his sons who fled with him. He was mentioned as having told his father in 377 that, in light of the capable prime minister Wang Meng's death, the Former Qin emperor Fu Jiān's reign appeared to be deteriorating and that Murong Chui should consider reestablishing Yan (which had fallen to Former Qin in 370). Murong Chui laughed off his suggestion at this point but kept it in mind.

Murong Nong would renew his suggestion in 383 after Former Qin had failed in its attempt to conquer Jin and been severely weakened in the defeat at the Battle of Fei River. Murong Chui agreed this time, and after receiving Fu Jiān's permission to go on a mission to try to pacify the northeastern empire, instead plotted rebellion. As part of the plan, as Murong Chui rose south of the Yellow River near Luoyang, Murong Nong and his cousin Murong Kai (慕容楷) started a rebellion of their own north of the Yellow River in spring 384. He quickly defeated the highly regarded Former Qin general Shi Yue, and became a major menace for Former Qin troops, and he was known both for his military strategies and strict discipline.

== During Murong Chui's reign ==
In spring 384, Murong Chui declared the establishment of Later Yan, and Murong Nong continued to contribute greatly to the campaigns that he would wage the next year against Former Qin remnants and other generals who had maintained semi-independence in light of Former Qin's collapse. Around the new year 386, Murong Nong stamped out all remaining Former Qin resistance in the You (幽州, modern Beijing, Tianjin, and northern Hebei) and Ping (平州, modern Liaoning) Provinces, including the rebel Yu Yan (餘巖), and further recovered some commanderies that Goguryeo had seized. Murong Chui made him effective viceroy of You and Ping Provinces, in charge of the old Former Yan capital Longcheng (龍城, in modern Jinzhou, Liaoning), and he remained in that post for several years, apparently greatly favored by the people of the region. In 386, Murong Chui created him the Prince of Liaoxi.

In 389, believing that there were no longer matters for him to attend to in the You/Ping region, Murong Nong submitted a report to Murong Chui requesting a recall to the capital Zhongshan (中山, in modern Baoding, Hebei), stating, in part:

I initially advanced my forces here to suppress rebels, and I was ordered to keep these provinces safe. My soldiers have rested for several years, and there are still many bandits in Qing (青州, modern central and eastern Shandong), Xu (徐州, modern northern Jiangsu and Anhui), Jing (荊州, modern Hubei), and Yong (雍州, modern central and northern Shaanxi) Provinces. I hope that soon someone will succeed me here, so that I may return and expend all my effort for the empire -- so that I do not have unspent strength while I am alive and regrets when I die.

(At that time, Qing, Xu, and Jing Provinces were under Jin rule, while Yong Province was under Later Qin, so Murong Nong was showing his ambition in conquering or at least defeating Jin and Later Qin.)

Murong Chui, upon receiving the report, summoned Murong Nong to the capital, and had his brother Murong Long the Prince of Gaoyang succeed him at Longcheng. For the next several years, Murong Nong participated in a number of his father's campaigns and was particularly effective in the campaign that destroyed the independent state of Wei and its emperor Zhai Zhao in 392. He also played a major role in Later Yan's destruction of Western Yan in 394, allowing Later Yan to seize modern Shanxi. In 394, Murong Nong attacked Jin's Qing Province, then under the governance of former Later Yan vassal Bilü Hun (辟閭渾) and had some success against Bilü, but around the new year 395, for reasons unknown, Murong Chui ordered him to return to Zhongshan and abandon the campaign.

During Murong Chui's reign, Murong Nong and Murong Long were the most well-regarded princes. Because of this, Murong Chui's wife Empress Duan Yuanfei once suggested to him that the crown prince Murong Bao lacked abilities to govern, and Murong Chui should choose either Murong Nong or Murong Long instead. Murong Chui, believing Murong Bao to be capable, rejected her suggestion.

Murong Nong's aura of invincibility, however, began to wane in 395—albeit in a campaign that he was not the supreme commander of. That year, aggravated by the harassing raids by the former Later Yan vassal Northern Wei's prince Tuoba Gui, Murong Chui sent Murong Bao to command an 80,000-men army, with Murong Nong and Murong Lin as his assistant commanders, to try to crush Northern Wei. However, after stalemates with Northern Wei near Hohhot, Inner Mongolia, Murong Bao retreated after false reports of Murong Chui's death—and was, in retreat, crushed by Tuoba Gui at the Battle of Canhe Slope, with loss of nearly the entire army. Murong Nong was, along with his brothers, able to escape death.

In early 396, Murong Chui personally led forces to try to force Northern Wei's submission, and Murong Nong and Murong Long were the forward commanders. They had initial successes against Northern Wei, but as the army passed through Canhe Slope, they mourned in such a great manner that Murong Chui, in shame and anger, grew ill, and the army was forced to retreat. He died soon thereafter and was succeeded by Murong Bao.

== During Murong Bao's reign ==
Murong Bao, although aware of Empress Duan's earlier suggestion to make Murong Nong or Murong Long crown prince (and in fact was so resentful of it that he forced her to commit suicide), appeared to trust his brothers greatly, and he made Murong Nong the viceroy of Bing Province (并州, modern central and northern Shanxi) to guard against a Northern Wei attack. However, Murong Nong immediately made the mistakes of collecting food for his troops—too much for the local population, then suffering from a famine, to support—and sending military officers to watch over non-Han tribes. The people became resolved to revolt, and they sent messengers to Northern Wei, requesting Tuoba Gui to advance on Bing Province. In late fall 396, he arrived at the capital of the province, Jinyang (晉陽, in modern Taiyuan, Shanxi), and when Murong Nong engaged Tuoba Gui in battle, Tuoba Gui defeated him, and he was forced to flee back to Zhongshan, but his wife and children were captured by Northern Wei and he himself was wounded.

Tuoba Gui continued his advance on Zhongshan. Murong Bao gave Murong Nong a small force to command in the defense of Zhongshan, but most of the military matters were entrusted to Murong Lin the Prince of Zhao, who advised Murong Bao not to engage Northern Wei forces, much to the frustration of Murong Nong and Murong Long. In spring 397, after Murong Lin failed in a coup attempt, he fled out of the capital, and Murong Bao, in fear that Murong Lin would seize a relief force commanded by his son Murong Hui the Prince of Qinghe, decided to abandon Zhongshan. Murong Nong's and Murong Long's subordinates tried to persuade each to stay in Zhongshan rather than to follow Murong Bao, but each refused, feeling that loyalty to their brother required them to follow him. They therefore followed Murong Bao and joined Murong Hui's army.

However, Murong Hui was resentful that he was not made crown prince, a position given to his younger brother Murong Ce (慕容策), and he considered seizing the position by force. Murong Bao, realizing this, tried to transfer some of Murong Hui's army to the commands of Murong Nong and Murong Long, but this only made Murong Hui more resentful, and he acted first against his uncles, sending assassins against them. Murong Long was killed, but Murong Nong survived the attack but was severely wounded (described as having suffered a wound so deep that his brain was visible), and Murong Hui, who then openly declared a coup, was then defeated and killed.

Murong Bao, who settled in at Longcheng, made Murong Nong his prime minister. At Murong Nong's suggestion, Murong Bao initially stopped his thoughts of regaining the lost provinces, but in early 398, against the advice of Murong Nong and Murong Sheng the Prince of Changle, Murong Bao resolved to try to advance south—but his army was worn out. As soon as Murong Bao left Longcheng, his general Duan Sugu (段速骨) started a rebellion, and the army abandoned Murong Bao, who immediately fled back to Longcheng. Meanwhile, Duan, having forced Murong Long's son Murong Chong (慕容崇) the Prince of Gaoyang as leader, sieged Longcheng. Even with secret help from Lan Han the Prince of Dunqiu—Murong Chui's uncle—however, Duan was initially unsuccessful, until Murong Nong inexplicably, in fear of his life, surrendered to him. This greatly destroyed the morale of Longcheng's defense forces, as everyone relied on Murong Nong's leadership, and Longcheng fell to Duan. Duan imprisoned Murong Nong, but his strategist Ajiao Luo (阿交羅) suggested that Murong Nong might be a better puppet than Murong Chong. Upon hearing this news, however, Murong Chong's attendants Zong Rang (鬷讓) and Chuli Jian (出力犍) assassinated Ajiao and Murong Nong.
