= Murong Bao =

Emperor Huimin of Later Yan 後燕惠愍帝

Emperor of Later Yan
- Reign: June 21, 396 – May 27, 398
- Predecessor: Murong Chui
- Successor: Lan Han (usurper)
- Born: 355
- Died: May 27, 398 (aged 42–43)
Full name
- Family name: Mùróng (慕容); Given name: Bǎo (寶)
Era name and dates
- Yǒngkāng (永康): June 21, 396 – May 27, 398
Posthumous name
- Emperor Huimin (惠愍皇帝, "benevolent and suffering") (full)
Temple name
- Lièzōng (烈宗) or Lièzǔ (烈祖)
- House: Murong
- Dynasty: Later Yan

Murong Bao (Chinese: 慕容寶; 355–27 May 398), courtesy name Daoyou (道佑), Xianbei name Kugou (庫勾), also known by his posthumous name as the Emperor Huimin of Later Yan (後燕惠愍帝), was an emperor of the Xianbei-led Chinese Later Yan dynasty. He inherited from his father Murong Chui (Emperor Wucheng) a sizable empire but lost most of it within a span of a year, and would be dead in less than three, a victim of a rebellion by his granduncle Lan Han. Historians largely attributed this to his irresolution and inability to judge military and political decisions. While the Later Yan would last for one more decade after his death, it would never regain the power it had under Murong Chui.

== Prior to Later Yan's establishment ==
Murong Bao was Murong Chui's fourth son, by his first wife Princess Duan while he was the Prince of Wu under his brother Murong Jun (Emperor Jingzhao of Former Yan). He was initially not his father's heir apparent—his older brother Murong Ling (慕容令), also born of Princess Duan, was. He lost his mother in 358 after she died in prison after being falsely accused of witchcraft against Murong Jun and his wife Empress Kezuhun. After Murong Chui fell into suspicion by Empress Dowager Kezuhun and the regent Murong Ping in 369 during the reign of Murong Jun's son Murong Wei, Murong Bao was among the members of Murong Chui's household who fled with him to Former Qin. After his brother Murong Ling fell into a trap set by Former Qin's prime minister Wang Meng (who did not trust Murong Chui or his sons) into defecting back to Former Yan and was subsequently killed, Murong Bao became his father's heir apparent.

In his young age, Murong Bao was not known for his abilities or ambitions, but for favoring flatterers. At one point he served as a commandery governor. In 383, he was a mid-level commander in the Former Qin army that set out to conquer Jin and reunite China but was defeated at the Battle of Fei River. When, after the army collapsed, the Former Qin emperor Fu Jiān fled to Murong Chui's army (which remained intact), Murong Bao tried to persuade his father to kill Fu Jiān and declare a rebellion, but Murong Chui declined. Around the new year 384, however, when Murong Chui had, after being sent by Fu Jiān on a mission to pacify the northeastern empire, become set to rebel instead, Murong Bao was involved in his first act of rebellion—massacring the Di soldiers that Murong Chui's deputy, Fu Feilong (苻飛龍), commanded. In spring 384, after Murong Chui claimed the title Prince of Yan, effectively declaring independence from Former Qin, he created Murong Bao crown prince.

== During Murong Chui's reign ==
As crown prince, Murong Bao became known as a studious learner and talented writer, and because of this and his careful cultivation of relationships with Murong Chui's servants and officials, his father saw him as a good successor, keeping him in that status despite how he favored the military abilities of his other sons Murong Nong the Prince of Liaoxi, Murong Long the Prince of Gaoyang, and Murong Lin the Prince of Zhao. (At one point, when Murong Chui's wise wife Empress Duan Yuanfei (Murong Bao's cousin) reminded him that Murong Bao lacked abilities and that Murong Nong or Murong Long would make a more appropriate successor, he, not believing her judgment, compared her derogatorily to Li Ji, the wife of Duke Xian of Jin of the Spring and Autumn period, who falsely accused crown prince Shensheng of crimes and had him killed.) As the years went by, Murong Bao was typically guarding the capital Zhongshan (中山, in modern Baoding, Hebei) as his father waged campaigns, and he appeared to serve in this role competently. In 388, when he was 33 and Murong Chui was 62, Murong Chui transferred most of the imperial authority to him, only retaining decision power over the most important matters.

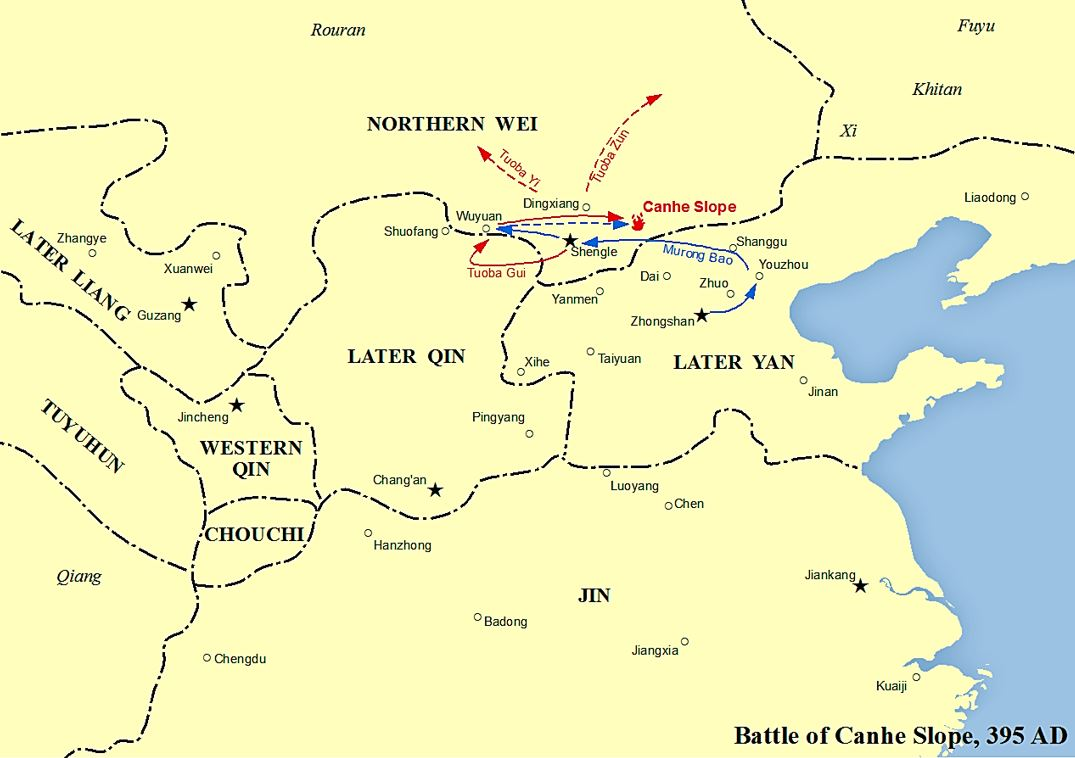
Battle of Canhe Slope in which Murong Bao was defeated by Tuoba Gui of Northern Wei

In 391, Murong Bao was, in all likelihood, involved in an incident that would fatefully lead to the breakup in relations with Later Yan's vassal Northern Wei. That year, Northern Wei's prince Tuoba Gui sent his brother Tuoba Gu (拓跋觚) to offer a tribute to Later Yan. Traditional historians record that Murong Chui's sons and brothers (plural, but by this point would be led by Murong Bao) detained Tuoba Gu and demanded that Tuoba Gui ransom him by offering horses. Tuoba Gui refused, and Tuoba Gu was not permitted to leave, and the relationship between Later Yan and Northern Wei was gone. Tuoba Gui entered into an alliance with Western Yan, and later, even after Western Yan was destroyed by Later Yan in 393, continued to harass Later Yan's border lands. In 395, Murong Bao, along with his brothers Murong Nong and Murong Lin, led an 80,000-men expedition that was intended to punish Northern Wei for its recalcitrance—but one that would have fateful consequences for Later Yan.

Tuoba Gui, hearing about Murong Bao's army, abandoned his capital Shengle (盛樂, in modern Hohhot, Inner Mongolia) and retreated west across the Yellow River. Murong Bao's army quickly reached the river in fall 395 and prepared to cross the river. However, by this point, Northern Wei scouts had cut off the line of communication between Murong Bao's army and the Later Yan capital Zhongshan, and Northern Wei had the captured Later Yan messengers declare that Murong Chui had already died, causing great disturbance in the Later Yan army. The Later Yan and Northern Wei forces stalemated across the Yellow River for 20 odd days, when Murong Lin's followers tried to start a coup and support Murong Lin as new leader, and while the coup failed, uncertainty fell on Later Yan forces. As winter came, Later Yan forces retreated and, not realizing that the Yellow River would freeze to allow Northern Wei forces to cross easily, Murong Bao left no rearguard as he retreated. Tuoba Gui personally gave chase, catching Later Yan forces unprepared at the Battle of Canhe Slope, killing or capturing nearly the entire Later Yan army, and only Murong Bao and a number of officers escaped. Tuoba Gui, fearful of the Later Yan captives, slaughtered them.

In 396, concerned that Northern Wei would then view Murong Bao lightly, Murong Chui personally led another expedition against Northern Wei, initially successful and killing Tuoba Gui's cousin Tuoba Qian (拓跋虔). However, as the army reached Canhe Slope, the soldiers cried out loud for their fathers and brothers, and Murong Chui became angry and ill, forcing the Later Yan forces to retreat to Zhongshan. He soon died, and Murong Bao succeeded him as emperor.

== Reign ==
One of the first things that Murong Bao did as emperor was forcing his stepmother Duan Yuanfei to commit suicide, still resentful that she advised his father to remove him as crown prince. However, he still buried her with his father, with imperial honors.

Murong Bao also faced a succession issue. His son Murong Hui the Duke of Qinghe was most favored by Murong Chui and considered the most capable, and when Murong Chui waged his last campaign, he put Murong Hui in charge of the old Former Yan capital, the important city of Longcheng (龍城, in modern Jinzhou, Liaoning). As Murong Chui was on his deathbed, he further told Murong Bao to make Murong Hui his crown prince, but Murong Bao favored his young son Murong Ce (慕容策) the Duke of Puyang, and did not favor Murong Hui. Further, Murong Sheng the Duke of Changle, who was slightly older than Murong Hui, also did not want Murong Hui to be crown prince, and so also encouraged Murong Bao to create Murong Ce crown prince. Murong Bao did so in fall 396, and created Murong Hui and Murong Sheng princes. Murong Hui was displeased and secretly considered rebellion.

Murong Bao had more immediate pressing concerns, however. In fall 396 as well, Tuoba Gui led his Northern Wei troops and made a surprise attack on Bing Province (并州, modern central and northern Shanxi), defeating Murong Nong and forcing him to flee back to Zhongshan. Tuoba Gui then advanced east, ready to attack Zhongshan. Accepting Murong Lin's suggestion, Murong Bao prepared to defend Zhongshan, leaving the Northern Wei forces free to roam over his territory, believing that Northern Wei would retreat once its forces are worn out. However, this had the effect that all of the cities' garrisons in modern Hebei abandoned them, except for Zhongshan and two other important cities -- Yecheng and Xindu (信都, in modern Hengshui, Hebei). After making an initial attack against Zhongshan and failing, Tuoba Gui changed his tactic to establishing his rule over the other cities while leaving Zhongshan alone. In spring 397, Xindu fell. Meanwhile, however, Tuoba Gui had received news of a rebellion near his capital Shengle and offered peace—which Murong Bao rejected, and Murong Bao attacked Northern Wei forces as Tuoba Gui prepared to retreat, but instead was defeated by Tuoba Gui at great loss. Murong Long offered to lead the remaining forces in Zhongshan in a battle against Northern Wei and Murong Bao agreed, but Murong Bao then vacillated and eventually, because Murong Lin opposed, cancelled the plan. He also vacillated between whether to accept a proposal to return Tuoba Gu to Northern Wei and ceding Bing Province for peace. When Murong Lin subsequently rebelled, Murong Bao worried that Murong Lin would seize Murong Hui's troops (which were then advancing toward Zhongshan to relieve it, but due to Murong Hui's continued resentment was advancing slowly), and so decided to abandon Zhongshan to head for Longcheng. Murong Long agreed with the plan, but outlined to Murong Bao the reasons, once at Longcheng he should not head back south for a long time. Murong Bao agreed, and they abandoned Zhongshan to join Murong Hui's forces.

Murong Hui, meanwhile, on the way back to Longcheng, considered seizing power by force and finally resolved to do so. He sent assassins to kill Murong Long and Murong Nong (believing that the two uncles posed the most military threat to him), but was only successful in killing Murong Long. Murong Bao and Murong Nong's forces quickly fled to Longcheng, and Murong Hui subsequently put Longcheng under siege. Under a surprise attack led by Gao Yun, however, Murong Hui's forces collapsed, and he fled back to Zhongshan, where the remaining garrison was under the leadership of Murong Bao's cousin Murong Xiang (慕容詳) the Duke of Kaifeng. Murong Xiang killed him. Meanwhile, Murong Bao adopted Gao Yun as his own son and created him the Duke of Xiyang.

As Murong Bao settled in at Longcheng, Zhongshan and Yecheng lost contact with him. Murong Xiang declared himself emperor, but was soon defeated and killed by Murong Lin, who also declared himself emperor. However, he was soon defeated by Northern Wei forces, and he fled to Yecheng and, giving up his imperial title, persuaded Murong Bao's uncle Murong De, the defender of Yecheng, to abandon it and head south of the Yellow River to Huatai (滑台, in modern Anyang, Henan). Murong De did so, and once at Huatai, in spring 398, he effectively declared independence by claiming the title Prince of Yan and changing era name, establishing Southern Yan. Meanwhile, not knowing this and having received Murong De's earlier report requesting that he return to the south, Murong Bao prepared a campaign to recover lost territory, against Murong Nong and Murong Sheng's pleas that the army was already worn out.

As soon as Murong Bao left Longcheng, however, his general Duan Sugu (段速骨) started a rebellion, and the army abandoned Murong Bao, who immediately fled back to Longcheng. Meanwhile, Duan, having forced Murong Long's son Murong Chong (慕容崇) the Prince of Gaoyang as leader, besieged Longcheng. Even with secret help from Lan Han the Prince of Dunqiu—Murong Chui's uncle—however, Duan was initially unsuccessful, until Murong Nong inexplicably surrendered to him, destroying morale and causing Longcheng to fall. Murong Bao and Murong Sheng fled south and, in the confusion, Lan took over Longcheng and offered to receive Murong Bao back. Murong Bao, who had reached Jicheng (modern Beijing) by this point, wanted to head back, but Murong Sheng persuaded to try to head south to seek aid from Murong De, not realizing that Murong De had declared independence. Once they reached the vicinity of Huatai, however, they heard about how Murong De had assumed imperial powers and therefore fled back north. Many cities on the way offered to coalesce around Murong Bao to start a new resistance against Northern Wei, but Murong Bao resolved to head back to Longcheng. Murong Sheng, suspecting that Lan Han was up to no good, tried to persuade Murong Bao otherwise, but was unable to get him to change his mind, and Murong Sheng fled and hid.

When Murong Bao approached Longcheng in early summer 398, Lan Han sent his brother Lan Jia'nan (蘭加難) to welcome Murong Bao but in actuality to guard him. Against the advice of Yu Chong (餘崇), Murong Bao accepted Lan Jia'nan's escort, and right outside Longcheng, Lan Jia'nan executed Yu and Murong Bao. Lan Han would then slaughter most of the Murong clan and take over the empire, but spared Murong Sheng (because Murong Sheng was the husband of one of his daughters), and two months later Murong Sheng would overthrow Lan Han and reestablish Later Yan with himself as its emperor. However, Later Yan would not be a key player again in Chinese military matters, and would fall a decade later.

== Personal information ==
- Father
  - Murong Chui (Emperor Wucheng)
- Mother
  - Princess Duan, posthumously honored as Empress Chengzhao
- Wife
  - Empress Duan (created 396, d. 400)
- Major Concubines
  - Consort Ding, mother of Prince Sheng
  - Consort Meng, mother of the later Empress Murong of Northern Wei
- Children
  - Murong Sheng (慕容盛), the Prince of Changle (created 396), later emperor
  - Murong Hui (慕容會), the Prince of Qinghe (created 396, killed by Murong Xiang 397)
  - Murong Ce (慕容策), the Crown Prince (created 396, killed by Lan Han 398)
  - Murong Yuán (慕容元, note different tone than his brother), initially the Duke of Chengyang, later the Duke of Pingyuan (forced to commit suicide 401)
  - Murong Yuān (慕容淵, note different tone than his brother), the Duke of Zhangwu (created 400, killed by Murong Xi 402)
  - Murong Min (慕容敏), the Duke of Hedong (created 394)
  - Murong Qian (慕容虔), the Duke of Boling (created 400, forced to commit suicide 406)
  - Murong Zhao (慕容昭), the Duke of Shangdang (forced to commit suicide 406)
  - Princess, later Empress Murong of Emperor Daowu of Northern Wei

== Popular culture ==
- Portrayed by Im Ho in the 2011-2012 KBS1 TV series Gwanggaeto, The Great Conqueror.

Emperor Huimin of (Later) Yan House of Murong Born: 355 Died: 398
Regnal titles
Preceded by Murong Chui	Emperor of Later Yan; 396–398	Succeeded by Murong Sheng
Preceded by Murong Chui	Emperor of Later Yan; 396–398	Succeeded by Murong De as Emperor of Southern Yan
Titles in pretence
Preceded by Murong Chui	— TITULAR — Emperor of China; 396–398; Reason for succession failure: Sixteen Kingdoms	Succeeded by Murong Sheng
Preceded by Murong Chui	— TITULAR — Emperor of China; 396–398; Reason for succession failure: Sixteen Kingdoms	Succeeded by Emperor Daowu of Northern Wei
Preceded by Murong Chui	— TITULAR — Emperor of China; 396–398; Reason for succession failure: Sixteen Kingdoms	Succeeded by Murong De
