= Murong Ke =

Classical Chinese nobleman

Murong Ke (Chinese: 慕容恪) (died 367 CE), courtesy name Xuangong (玄恭), posthumous name Prince Huan of Taiyuan (太原桓王), was a general and statesman of the Xianbei-led Chinese Former Yan dynasty. He was a son of Murong Huang (Prince Wenming), and later served as the regent for his brother Murong Jun (Emperor Jingzhao)'s son Murong Wei (Emperor You).

== Early life ==
Murong Ke was Murong Huang's fourth son, by his concubine Consort Gao. In the Book of Jin, Murong Ke was described as over 2.1 metres tall and had an imposing look when he was just 15 years old. In his youth, he became known for his deep-thinking and tolerance of others, but was not viewed highly by his father because his father did not favor his mother. Only after he turned 14, when his father began to be impressed by the strategies that he had, was he given important responsibilities. Sometime before 345, he was given the important defense post of Liaodong (遼東, in modern Liaoyang, Liaoning) with the responsibility of defending the eastern border against Goguryeo. In 345, he was sent by Murong Huang to launch an attack on Goguryeo, and the attack was successful. In 346, formally under the command of his brother, the heir apparent Murong Jun, but with him in actual command, he attacked Buyeo (Fuyu (夫餘) in Chinese), capturing its capital and its king Hyeon of Buyeo (玄王).

In 348, Murong Huang neared death, and he told Murong Jun that he should rely on his brother Murong Ke if he wanted to accomplish great things. He died soon thereafter and was succeeded by Murong Jun, who made Murong Ke one of his major generals.

== During Murong Jun's reign ==
In 349, as rival Later Zhao was collapsing in light of internecine wars between the sons of the deceased emperor Shi Hu and his adoptive grandson Shi Min, Murong Jun, under the advice of another brother Murong Ba, planned an invasion into the North China Plain, and Murong Ke was one of the major generals for the planned invasion. In 350, Former Yan forces quickly captured Later Zhao's You Province (幽州, modern Beijing, Tianjin, and northern Hebei). Murong Ke's military discipline was said to be so strict that not even trees and grass were harmed as his army marched through a region, and he quickly seized a number of commanderies in Ji Province (冀州, modern central Hebei) from Ran Wei, the new state established by Shi Min (who had by now changed his name to Ran Min, back to the family name that his father had before he was adopted by Shi Hu).

In 352, Ran Min marched north, ready to engage Former Yan forces. Former Yan soldiers were apprehensive of Ran Min's reputation for being a fierce warrior, but Murong Ke devised a plan to trap Ran, whose forces were largely infantry and had been based in forests. Murong Ke pretended to repeatedly lose engagements, and Ran Wei forces were drawn into the plains. Murong Ke then put his cavalry into square formations, with horses locked in formations with chains, and the Ran Wei infantry could not stand the pressure and collapsed. Ran Min was still battling when his horse suddenly died, and he fell and was captured. Murong Jun executed him and then marched on to the Ran Wei capital Yecheng (鄴城), where Ran Min's wife Empress Dong, his crown prince Ran Zhi, and high level officials continued to try to fend off Former Yan for a while, but late in 352, Yecheng fell, and most of Ran Wei's territory fell to Former Yan. When Murong Jun then claimed imperial title, he created Murong Ke the Prince of Taiyuan in 353.

During the next few years, as a number of former Later Zhao generals were still trying to maintain independence and vacillated between Former Yan, Former Qin, and Jin, Murong Ke was involved in a number of successful campaigns to destroy them or force their submission. These included campaigns against Su Lin (蘇林) in winter 352, Li Du (李犢) in summer 353, and Lü Hu in spring 354. In 356, Murong Ke further defeated Duan Kan (段龕), the Jin vassal who had occupied Shandong Peninsula under the title Duke of Qi, sieging his heavily fortified capital Guanggu (廣固, in modern Qingzhou, Shandong) and forcing his surrender. In 358, he repelled a Jin attack led by Zhuge You (諸葛攸) and further counterattacked, seizing a number of Jin commanderies south of the Yellow River.

Around new year 360, Murong Jun grew ill, and he told Murong Ke that since his 10-year-old son, Murong Wei the Crown Prince, was too young, and that the empire was facing threats from Jin and Former Qin, he was ready to pass the throne to Murong Ke. Murong Ke declined, persuading Murong Jun that if his abilities were capable of ruling over the empire, then they were also capable of assisting the young emperor. Murong Jun soon died, entrusting his son to Murong Ke, Yang Wu, his uncle Murong Ping the Prince of Shangyong, and Muyu Gen, but with Murong Ke as regent.

== As regent for Murong Wei ==
Murong Ke soon had to face a challenge against Muyu Gen, who considered himself the senior official, having accomplished much during the reigns of Murong Huang and Murong Jun, and was unwilling to submit to the much younger Murong Ke. He first tried to create a rift by trying to persuade Murong Ke to take over the throne—which Murong Ke rebuked him about but declined to kill him despite suggestions to do so from Murong Chui (formerly known as Murong Ba) the Prince of Wu and Huangfu Zhen. Instead, Muyu then tried to persuade Murong Jun's wife Empress Dowager Kezuhun and the young emperor that Murong Ke and Murong Ping were planning a rebellion. Empress Dowager Kezuhun believed him, but the emperor did not and refused to authorize action. After Murong Ke heard about this, he executed Muyu and his coconspirators. With Murong Jun recently deceased and a major purge having followed, the officials in the Former Yan regime all were terrified, but Murong Ke calmed them by calm demeanor—including only having one servant accompany him wherever he went, without heavy guards. As far as his military command style was concerned, this was said about it in Sima Guang's Zizhi Tongjian:

Murong Ke did not rely on terrorizing his army with punishments, but relied on kindness and faithfulness. He calmed his soldiers and paid attention to important things, and did not micromanage. Everyone felt protected by order. In ordinary times, the military laws were relaxed, and it might appear as if he lacked discipline and could be defeated easily. Instead, reality was that he paid great care to defense, and enemies could not get close. Therefore, he never lost a battle.

Indeed, in recorded history there was not a single mention that Murong Ke lost a battle. He was also described as a capable regent, being humble and willing to listen to suggestions. He did not deal out heavy punishments for officials' mistakes, and he consulted with Murong Ping on all important decisions. In 361, a magician much favored by the young emperor, Ding Jin (丁進), tried to flatter Murong Ke by persuading him to kill Murong Ping and take all power. Murong Ke, instead, had the magician executed. Later that year, Lü Hu, whom Murong Ke had forced the surrender of years earlier, rebelled, and Murong Ke defeated him, forcing him to flee to Jin.

In 364, Murong Ke led an army against Luoyang, which had been in Jin hands since 356. In 365, after a fierce attack, Luoyang fell, and he captured the Jin general Shen Jing (沈勁; son of Shen Chong), whom he initially wanted to spare, but who continuously refused to submit and therefore whom his deputy Muyu Qian (慕輿虔) insisted on executing. Murong Ke, upon return to Yecheng, stated that he felt ashamed that he was unable to preserve Shen's life and allow his abilities to be used by Former Yan.

In 366, both he and Murong Ping offered to resign their posts and return all authority to the 16-year-old emperor Murong Wei. Murong Wei declined.

In 367, Murong Ke grew ill. He was afraid that a post that was part of his responsibility, the commander of the armies, would be given in an inappropriate person. He therefore tried to persuade Murong Wei's older brother Murong Zang (慕容臧) the Prince of Le'an and Murong Ping that the post should be given to Murong Chui, whose abilities he was greatly impressed with (but who had been viewed with suspicion by Empress Dowager Kezuhun). On his death bed, he also tried to persuade the young emperor of the same thing. However, after he died later that year, Murong Ping disagreed and took most of the power, giving the commander of the armies post to Murong Wei's younger brother Murong Chong the Prince of Zhongshan. What Murong Ke feared happened, as with Murong Ping in charge, Former Qin destroyed Former Yan in 370, just three years after his death. (Note: As Former Qin's capable prime minister Wang Meng approached the Former Yan capital Yecheng, his army showed the same discipline that Murong Ke's did, and the people joyously stated, "We have met the Prince of Taiyuan again!" Upon hearing this, Wang, who had been quite confident about his own abilities, became impressed at Murong Ke, and sent messengers to offer sacrifices to him.)

== Descendants ==
The Eastern Wei general, Murong Shaozong (慕容绍宗), was also his descendant.

=== Sons ===
- Murong Kai (慕容楷), Prince of Taiyuan (created 384).
- Murong Su (慕容肅), executed by Fú Jiān 384 along with Murong Wei
- Murong Shao (慕容绍), Prince of Chenliu, killed in Battle of Canhe Slope 395

=== Grandsons ===
- Murong Qi (慕容奇), son of Murong Kai and a daughter of Lan Han, would succeed Kai's title and died 395.

== See also ==
- Murong for others with the surname and ethnicity
