= Wenming =

Wenming may refer to:

- Murong Huang (297–348), or Prince Wenming, founding monarch of Former Yan
- Wenming (684), the first era name of Emperor Ruizong of Tang when his mother ruled the empire

== See also ==
- Empress Wenming (disambiguation)
