= Murong Hui (Later Yan) =

Murong Hui (慕容會) (373–397) was a general and imperial prince of the Xianbei state Later Yan, who served under his grandfather Murong Chui (Emperor Wucheng) and father Murong Bao (Emperor Huimin). During his father's reign, angry that he was not created crown prince, he tried to seize that position by force, but after his failure was killed.

Murong Hui was born to Murong Bao and a concubine described as of lowly birth while Murong Bao was a low-level Former Qin official, after Murong Chui, a Former Yan prince, had sought refuge with Former Qin's emperor Fu Jiān in 369 after a dispute with Former Yan's Empress Kezuhun and regent Murong Ping, and after Former Qin had destroyed Former Yan in 370. He was therefore probably born in the Former Qin capital Chang'an, where Murong Bao served.

When Murong Chui rebelled against Former Qin in 384 and established Later Yan, Murong Hui was in Chang'an, then still under Former Qin control. After the last Former Yan emperor Murong Wei, then a Former Qin general, tried to rebel within the city around the new year 385, Fu Jiān ordered the Xianbei in the city killed, but Murong Hui, along with his uncle Murong Rou (慕容柔) and brother Murong Sheng, were not killed, apparently because Murong Rou had been adopted by the eunuch Song Ya (宋牙). Soon thereafter, though, Murong Rou, Murong Sheng, and Murong Hui fled Chang'an and sought refuge with Murong Wei's brother and the leader of the nascent Western Yan state, Murong Chong.

Western Yan eventually captured Chang'an, but Murong Chong was killed in a coup, and the Xianbei people of the state abandoned Chang'an and began heading east back to their homeland. After a series of coups in 386, Murong Yong became emperor, and under his leadership Western Yan settled in at Zhangzi (長子, in modern Changzhi, Shanxi). In winter 386, Murong Sheng saw that they were being suspected by Murong Yong on account of their being descendants of Murong Chui, and therefore persuaded Murong Rou and Murong Hui to flee to Later Yan. It took them a year to arrive in the Later Yan capital Zhongshan (中山, in modern Baoding, Hebei), and upon arrival in the capital, Murong Hui was created the Duke of Qinghe.

Murong Chui greatly favored Murong Hui's abilities and impressive looks, and whenever Murong Bao, then Murong Chui's crown prince, would accompany Murong Chui on campaigns, Murong Chui put Murong Hui in charge of the crown prince's household, and ordered that he accorded the same respect as the crown prince during those times. In 395, after Murong Bao had suffered a devastating defeat at the hands of Later Yan's former vassal, Northern Wei's prince Tuoba Gui, in preparation of another attack against Northern Wei, Murong Chui recalled Murong Hui's uncle Murong Long, the viceroy at the old Former Yan capital Longcheng (龍城, in modern Jinzhou, Liaoning), to the capital with his troops, and he made Murong Hui viceroy at Longcheng. He grew extremely ill in early 396, however, and died during the campaign and was succeeded by Murong Bao.

Before Murong Chui died, he urged Murong Bao to make Murong Hui crown prince. However, Murong Bao favored his young son Murong Ce (慕容策, 13 years Murong Hui's junior) and did not consider Murong Hui. Murong Sheng, who was slightly older than Murong Hui, also did not want to see Murong Hui as crown prince, and therefore persuaded Murong Bao to create Murong Ce crown prince. Murong Hui was only promoted to Prince of Qinghe, and he resented this greatly.

Later in 396, Northern Wei launched a major attack on Later Yan, immediately seizing most of the central and western provinces of the empire, and putting Zhongshan under siege. Murong Hui mobilized his troops under guise of heading for his father's aid, but did not actually have the desire to do so, and so advanced slowly only after the urging of the general Yu Chong (餘崇). As he reached Zhongshan's vicinity, his father abandoned Zhongshan and joined his army. Murong Bao immediately saw that Murong Hui was still resentful, and tried to transfer the command of the army to his own brothers Murong Long and Murong Nong, but this only angered Murong Hui more. Seeing his uncles as his threats, he sent assassins against them, killing Murong Long but only wounding Murong Nong, and then falsely accused Murong Long and Murong Nong of treason. Murong Bao initially pretended to believe him, and then tried to have him assassinated but failed. Murong Hui then rose in open rebellion, demanding the position of crown prince, and as Murong Bao had then reached Longcheng first, Murong Hui tried to put Longcheng under siege. The general Gao Yun, however, led a surprise attack against him, and his troops collapsed. He fled back to Zhongshan, then under the control of his cousin Murong Xiang (慕容詳) the Duke of Kaifeng, but Murong Xiang executed him. Murong Bao executed his mother and sons as well.
