= Hyeon of Buyeo =

Last true king of Buyeo

Hyeon of Buyeo 부여 현

King of Buyeo
- Reign: ? – 346
- Predecessor: King Uira
- Successor: King Yeoul
- Died: Unknown
- Spouse: Unknown
- Issue: Unknown
- Father: Unknown

- Hyeon of Buyeo
- Hangul: 부여현
- Hanja: 夫餘玄
- RR: Buyeo Hyeon
- MR: Puyŏ Hyŏn

King Hyeon (fl. 4th century) was the last true king of Buyeo. His last name was Buyeo (夫餘) and his first name was Hyeon (玄). During his reign, Buyeo was attacked by the Former Yan and was virtually destroyed. After that, Hyeon became the son-in-law of Murong Huang, the King of Former Yan.

== Biography ==
The birth and death dates of King Hyeon are not known. His relationship with the King Uira is also unknown. In c.February 347, Murong Huang, the Prince of (Former) Yan, sent his son, Murong Jun, accompanied by his brother, Murong Ke, his uncle, Murong Jūn and the general, Muyu Gen, with 17,000 cavalry to attack Buyeo. The invasion practically destroyed Buyeo; King Hyeon and 50,000 people were captured and relocated to Yan. To win the support of the Buyeo refugees, Murong Huang gave his daughter in marriage to King Hyeon and also gave him the title of General Who Guards the Army (진동장군; 鎮軍將軍).

During the Former Yan and Former Qin dynasties, there was a Buyeo official named Hae Yeoul. After he assisted Murong Chui in establishing the Later Yan, he was bestowed the nominal title of King of Buyeo. His relation to Hyeon, however, is unclear.

== In popular culture ==
- Portrayed by Park-yongjin in the 2010–2011 KBS1 TV series The King of Legend.
