= Liezong =

Liezong is an imperial temple name for several Chinese monarchs. It may refer to:

- Liu Cong (Han-Zhao) (died 318), emperor of Han-Zhao
- Murong Bao (355–398), emperor of Later Yan
- Emperor Xiaowu of Jin (362–396)

== See also ==
- Liezu (disambiguation)
