= Empress Duan =

Empress Duan is the name of:

- Empress Duan (An Lushan's wife), second wife of An Lushan, emperor of state of Yan in Tang Dynasty (756-757)
- Empress Duan (Huimin) (4th-century–400), empress of the Chinese/Xianbei state Later Yan (396-398)
- Empress Duan Jifei (4th-century–5th-century), empress of the Chinese/Xianbei state Southern Yan (398-405)
- Empress Duan Yuanfei (died 396), empress of the Chinese/Xianbei state Later Yan (388-396)

== See also ==
- Princess Duan (disambiguation)
