= Empress Kezuhun (Murong Wei's wife) =

Empress Kezuhun (可足渾皇后, personal name unknown) was an empress of the Xianbei-led Chinese Former Yan dynasty. Her husband was Murong Wei (Emperor You), the last emperor of the state.

She was the daughter of Kezuhun Yi (可足渾翼), the cousin of Murong Wei's mother Empress Dowager Kezuhun; the Empress Dowager may have ordered the marriage, which took place in 369.

There was no further historical record of her, although presumably she was relocated to the Former Qin capital Chang'an in 370 when Former Qin destroyed Former Yan. It is not known whether she survived to 385, when her husband was executed by Former Qin in light of his attempt to join his brother Murong Chong in rebellion.

Chinese royalty
Preceded by Empress Kezuhun (Murong Jun's wife)	Empress of Former Yan; 369–370	Dynasty ended
Preceded by Empress Kezuhun (Murong Jun's wife)	Empress of China (Northern); 369–370	Succeeded by Empress Gou of Former Qin
