= Princess Duan (Murong Chui's wife) =

Princess Duan (Chinese: 段王妃, personal name unknown) (died 358), formally Empress Chengzhao (成昭皇后, literally "the successful and accomplished empress") was the first wife of the Former Yan general Murong Chui, who would later become the founder of Later Yan. She was the mother of his sons Murong Ling (慕容令) and Murong Bao.

Princess Duan was the daughter of Duan Mobo, one in a line of Duan chiefs carrying the title of Duke of Liaoxi. Because she came from an honored lineage (originally on par with Former Yan's imperial clan, the Murongs), she did not respect Murong Jun (Emperor Jingzhao)'s wife Empress Kezuhun, and Empress Kezuhun despised her greatly. In 358, perhaps at Empress Kezuhun's instigation, the eunuch Nie Hao (涅浩) falsely accused Princess Duan of witchcraft. Murong Jun had her and her alleged coconspirator, Murong Chui's assistant Gao Bi (高弼), arrested.

Princess Duan and Gao were tortured, but they refused to admit the charges of witchcraft, and because of this the torture was intensified. Murong Chui was saddened by his wife's suffering, and he sent her a message trying to persuade her to end her suffering by admitting to the charge (and thus end the torture but be sentenced to death). Princess Duan remarked:

I am not fearful of death. However, if I falsely implicate myself, I admit to treason. I would be betraying my ancestors and dragging Your Royal Highness into this disaster. The results are dire, and I will not do this.

As she was interrogated, Princess Duan replied logically and openly, and Murong Chui was able to avoid being dragged into the case, but she still died in prison, either from the torture or a secret execution.

Murong Chui subsequently married her sister, and then her niece Duan Yuanfei as his wife. In 388, after he had established Later Yan, he posthumously honored her as Empress Chengzhao.
