= Duan Yuanfei =

Duan Yuanfei (段元妃) (died 396), formally Empress Cheng'ai (成哀皇后, literally "the successful and lamentable empress"), was an empress of the Xianbei-led Chinese Later Yan dynasty. Her husband was the state's founding emperor, Murong Chui (Emperor Wucheng). Her given name is lost to history, but her courtesy name Yuanfei was recorded. She was the niece of two of Murong Chui's prior wives, who were daughters of the Xianbei chief Duan Mobo. Her father Duan Yi (段儀) was a brother of the Princesses Duan.

== Life ==
Murong Chui married Duan Yuanfei in or slightly earlier than 388. His younger brother Murong De married her sister Duan Jifei around the same time. He created her empress in 388 and favored her greatly. They had two sons, Murong Lang (慕容朗) the Prince of Bohai and Murong Jian (慕容鑒) the Prince of Boling.

Empress Duan was described as being intelligent and a good judge of character. As she saw that Murong Chui's crown prince Murong Bao lacked governing talents, she tried to persuade him to make one of his more capable sons, Murong Nong the Prince of Liaoxi or Murong Long the Prince of Gaoyang, crown prince, but Murong Chui, believing in the flattery that Murong Bao's associates had given him, disbelieved Empress Duan and kept Murong Bao as crown prince. She had also advised him to put his treacherous son Murong Lin the Prince of Zhao to death. As a result, Murong Bao and Murong Lin greatly resented her.

After Murong Chui died in 396, Murong Bao sent Murong Lin to threaten her and force her to commit suicide—stating that if she did not, he would do harm to her clan. In anger, she stated that Murong Bao would soon cause the empire's destruction, and then committed suicide. Initially, Murong Bao refused to give her an empress' burial honors, but after his official Sui Sui (眭邃) publicly articulated reasons why she should be honored, Murong Bao relented and buried her with imperial honors.

Chinese royalty
| Preceded by None (dynasty founded) | Prince/Empress of Later Yan; 388–396 | Succeeded by Empress Duan (Huimin) |
| Preceded by Empress Gou of Former Qin | Empress of China (Northeastern); 388–396 | Succeeded by Empress Duan (Huimin) |
| Preceded by Empress Yang of Former Qin | Empress of China (Central/Southern Shanxi); 394–396 | Succeeded by Empress Duan (Huimin) |
