= Murong Jun =

Emperor Jingzhao of Former Yan 前燕景昭帝
- Emperor of Yan

Ruler of Former Yan
- Reign: 348–360
- Coronation: 4 January 353 (crowned as Emperor)
- Predecessor: Murong Huang
- Successor: Murong Wei
- Born: 319
- Died: 360 (aged 40–41)
- Burial: Long Mausoleum (龍陵)
- Spouse: Empress Dowager Kezuhun; Empress Jingde
- Issue: Murong Ye, Crown Prince Jinghuai; Murong Wei; Murong Hong; Murong Chong; Princess Qinghe
Full name
- Family name: Mùróng (慕容); Given name: Jùn (儁)
Era dates
- Yuánxǐ (元璽): 353–357; Guāngshòu (光壽): 357–360
Regnal name
- Prince of Yan (燕王, 348–353); Emperor (since 353)
Posthumous name
- Emperor Jingzhao (景昭皇帝, lit. "decisive and accomplished")
Temple name
- Liezu (烈祖)
- House: Murong
- Dynasty: Former Yan
- Father: Murong Huang

Murong Jun (Chinese: 慕容儁; 319 – 23 February 360), Xianbei name Helaiba (賀賴跋), courtesy name Xuanying (宣英), also known by his posthumous name as the Emperor Jingzhao of Former Yan (前燕景昭帝), was the second and penultimate ruler of the Former Yan dynasty of China. He initially held the Eastern Jin-created title of Prince of Yan, but later claimed the title of emperor in 353. During his reign, the state expanded from possessing merely modern-day Liaoning and parts of Hebei to nearly all of the territory north of the Yellow River and some substantial holdings south of the Yellow River. The Book of Jin described Murong Jun as being approximately 2 metres (6.6 ft) tall and having an imposing look.

== Early career ==
Murong Jun was born in 319, while his father Murong Huang was still the heir apparent to his grandfather Murong Hui, the Jin-created Duke of Liaodong. In his youth, he was considered to be learned in both literary and military matters. Sometime after his father succeeded his grandfather in 333, he was made the heir apparent, a status that he retained after his father claimed the title Prince of Yan in 337 and after the Jin retroactively acknowledged that title in 341.

Historical accounts indicate that Murong Huang also considered Murong Jun's younger brother Murong Ba as the heir apparent, being impressed with Murong Ba's intelligence, but was dissuaded from it by his officials; those sources also attribute this as the reason why Murong Jun was jealous and apprehensive of Murong Ba. If this were true, it did not stop Murong Jun from granting his brother substantial authority during his reign.

The first historical mention of his being involved in leading the army was in 344, when he, along with his uncle Murong Ping, was commissioned to lead an army against Dai, but as the Dai prince Tuoba Shiyiqian refused to engage his army, no significant battle occurred.

In 346, Murong Huang commissioned him to command an army against Buyeo (Fuyu (夫餘) in Chinese), although the actual command appeared to be held by his brother Murong Ke. The army successfully in capturing the capital of Buyeo and its king Hyeon of Buyeo (玄王).

In 348, Murong Huang died. Murong Jun succeeded him as the Prince of Yan.

== Prince of Yan ==
In 349, following the death of rival Later Zhao's emperor Shi Hu, Later Zhao fell into destructive wars with Shi Hu's sons and his adoptive grandson Shi Min (who later changed his family name back to his father's original "Ran"). Under the suggestion of Murong Ba (whom he had renamed Murong Chui by this point), Murong Jun prepared for expansion into Later Zhao's territory. He commissioned Murong Ke, Murong Ping, Yang Wu, and Murong Chui as major generals, preparing for a major attack against Later Zhao's border region.

In the spring of 350, Murong Jun launched the attack, and they quickly captured the important city of Jicheng (薊城, in modern Beijing). Murong Jun then moved the capital from Longcheng (龍城, in modern Jinzhou, Liaoning) to Jicheng. In short order, the entire Youzhou (幽州, modern Beijing, Tianjin, and northern Hebei) came under Former Yan's control. He then continued to march south, but temporarily halted his advances after nearly being defeated by the Later Zhao general Lubo Zao (鹿勃早).

Murong Jun resumed his campaign in the winter of 350, as Ran Min, who had by now established the new state of Ran Wei, was battling Later Zhao's remnants under Shi Zhi. He quickly captured a number of commanderies in Ji Province (冀州, modern central Hebei), approaching Shi Zhi's provisional capital Xiangguo (襄國, in modern Xintai, Hebei). Shi Zhi, under attack by Ran Min, sought Murong Jun's assistance in early 351, offering to surrender to Murong Jun the imperial seals (which he did not have). Murong Jun sent his general Yue Wan to join Shi Zhi and his general Yao Xiang, and their joint forces dealt Ran Min a major defeat, forcing Ran Min to give up on sieging Xiangguo for the time being, although soon thereafter Ran Min persuaded Shi Zhi's general Liu Xian (劉顯) to kill Shi Zhi, ending Later Zhao.

In the summer of 352, Murong Jun's and Ran Min's forces engaged in a major battle. Murong Ke, in command of Murong Jun's primary forces, tricked Ran Min's infantry into entering the plains, then dealt him a major defeat with attacks by cavalry forces. During the heat of the battle, Ran Min's horse was killed; he fell and the Murong troops captured him. When Ran was taken to Murong Jun, the latter rebuked him: "How could a lowly knave like you have the audacity to be a Pretender to the Throne?" However Ran Min, an ethnic Han, accused Murong Jun of being "an over-ambitious barbarian Pretender" in turn. Enraged, Murong had Ran Min whipped 300 times, exiled and later beheaded; although he soon became apprehensive about the possibilities of Ran's vengeful spirit causing a draught, and eventually Ran was buried with honours.

Murong Jun next marched against the Ran Wei capital Ye (in modern Handan, Hebei). Ran Wei's crown prince Ran Zhi, Empress Dong, and key officials sought assistance from the Jin.

At this time Murong Jun was still technically a Jin vassal, but was not going to continue to submit to the Jin. Even with Jin assistance, however, Ye's defenses were soon breached, and Former Yan forces captured Ran Zhi and Empress Dong, ending Ran Wei. Murong Jun gave both Ran Zhi and Empress Dong honorable titles (Marquess of Haibin for Ran Zhi, Lady of Fengxi for Empress Dong) and apparently treated them with kindness, claiming that Empress Dong had surrendered the imperial seals to him (the real imperial seals were in the possetion of the Jin). Most of Later Zhao's eastern territories were securely in Former Yan's hands, although Former Yan, Former Qin, and Jin would fight over their borders for years to come.

In the winter of 352, Murong Jun formally declared independence from the Jin and declared himself emperor.

== Emperor ==
On 6 April 353, Murong Jun made his wife Princess Kezuhun empress and his heir apparent Murong Ye (慕容瞱) crown prince. In 354, Murong Jun made many of his uncles, brothers, and sons princes.

In 355, angered that his cousin Duan Kan (段龕), who was in control of modern Shandong and nominally a Jin vassal (as Duke of Qi), wrote a letter to him denouncing him for claiming an imperial title, Murong Jun sent Murong Ke and Yang Wu against him. In 356, despite the heavy fortifications that Duan's capital Guanggu (廣固, in modern Qingzhou, Shandong) had, Murong Ke sieged it, and after Duan's food supplies ran out, he was forced to surrender. Murong Jun initially spared Duan, but for unknown reasons, he executed Duan in 357.

Also in 356, Murong Jun's crown prince Murong Ye died, and in 357, Murong Jun made his younger son Murong Wei crown prince.

Later in 357, Murong Jun moved the capital from Jicheng to Ye.

In 358, Murong Jun began large scale conscription—ordering each family to send its service-eligible men into the army except for one per household—preparing to attack Former Qin and Jin. After a petition by Liu Gui (劉貴), he scaled back the conscription plan, ordering that for every five service-eligible men of the household, three enter the army.

Later in 358, the grudges between Murong Jun and Murong Chui flared up again. Murong Chui's wife Princess Duan, because her clan was an honored one—being previously on equal standing as the Murongs, with the title of Duke of Liaoxi—was not respectful of Murong Jun's wife Empress Kezuhun. The eunuch Nie Hao (涅浩), believing it to be the emperor and empress' wishes, falsely accused Princess Duan and Murong Chui's assistant Gao Bi (高弼) of witchcraft, with intent to drag Murong Chui into the case. However, despite torture, Princess Duan and Gao refused to admit, and Murong Chui avoided becoming entangled, although Princess Duan still died in prison. Murong Chui was effectively exiled as the governor of the remote Ping Province (平州, modern eastern Liaoning).

In 359, Jin forces under Zhuge You (諸葛攸) and Xie Wan (謝萬) attacked Former Yan, but were defeated by Former Yan forces. This victory allowed Former Yan to gradually take over the modern Henan region, south of the Yellow River.

In early 360, Murong Jun grew ill, and he told Murong Ke that, in light of the rivalries with Former Qin and Jin, he was going to pass the throne to him instead, since he was an adult and highly capable, rather than the 10-year-old Murong Wei. Murong Ke declined—persuading Murong Jun that if his abilities were capable of ruling over the empire, then they were also capable of assisting the young emperor. He also summoned Murong Chui back to the capital. Afterwards, he grew slightly better, and with the men he conscripted gathered at Ye, he intended to have Murong Ke and Yang Wu make a major assault against Jin, but soon his illness grew worse. He then summoned Murong Ke, Yang, Murong Ping, and Muyu Gen (慕輿根) to entrust the crown prince to them. He died soon after and was succeeded by Murong Wei.

== Personal information ==
- Father
  - Murong Huang (Prince Wenming)
- Mother
  - Likely Princess Duan, Murong Huang's wife
- Wife
  - Empress Kezuhun (created 353)
- Major Concubines
  - Consort Duan, posthumously honored by Murong Chui as Empress Jingde
- Children
  - Murong Ye (慕容瞱), Crown Prince Xianhuai (created 353, d. 356)
  - Murong Xian (慕容咸), later changed to Murong Zang (慕容臧), the Prince of Le'an (created 353)
  - Murong Liang (慕容亮), the Prince of Bohai (created 353, killed by Murong Huan (慕容桓) the Prince of Yidu 370)
  - Murong Wen (慕容溫), the Prince of Daifang (created 353), later Prince Dao of Lelang during Later Yan (assassinated by Zhai Liao (翟遼)'s followers 389)
  - Murong She (慕容涉), the Prince of Yuyang (created 353)
  - Murong Wei (慕容暐), initially the Prince of Zhongshan (created 353), later the Crown Prince (created 357), later emperor
  - Murong Hong (慕容泓), the Prince of Jibei (created 359), later ruler of Western Yan
  - Murong Chong (慕容沖), the Prince of Zhongshan (created 359), later Emperor Wei of Western Yan
  - Murong Yuan (慕容淵), the Prince of Dingxiang
  - A daughter, later concubine of Fu Jiān

Emperor Jingzhao of (Former) Yan House of Murong Born: 319 Died: 360
Regnal titles
Preceded by Himself as Prince of Yan	Emperor of Former Yan; 352–360	Succeeded by Murong Wei
Chinese royalty
Preceded by Murong Huang	Prince of Yan; 348–352	Succeeded by Himself as Emperor of Former Yan
Titles in pretence
Preceded by Ran Min	— TITULAR — Emperor of China; 352–360; Reason for succession failure: Sixteen Kingdoms	Succeeded by Murong Wei
