= Empress Wenming =

Empress Wenming (Chinese: 文明皇后) may refer to:

- Wang Yuanji (217–268), empress dowager of the Jin dynasty
- Princess Duan (Murong Huang's wife) (fl. 4th century), empress of Former Yan (the empress title might have been created posthumously)
- Empress Dowager Feng (442–490), empress of Northern Wei
