= Princess Duan (Murong Huang's wife) =

Princess Duan (段王后, personal name unknown) was the wife of the Murong Huang, the founder of the Xianbei-led Chinese Former Yan dynasty.

She was likely a daughter of a Duan tribal chief, as the Duans and the Murongs intermarried frequently. When Murong Huang claimed the title "Prince of Yan" in 337, she was created princess. There was no further mentioning of her during the reign of Murong Huang or his son and successor Murong Jun, who was likely her son, but there is no conclusive evidence.

It is not known when she died. Sometime after Murong Jun declared himself emperor in 352, she was honored as an empress, although it was not clear whether she was still alive at that point. After Former Yan's fall in 370 and subsequent "restoration" as Later Yan in 384 by Murong Chui, the son of her husband Murong Huang but by his concubine Consort Lan, not her, Murong Chui excluded her from her husband's temple and enshrined his mother Consort Lan instead.

Chinese royalty
Preceded by None (dynasty founded)	Princess of Former Yan; 337–348?	Succeeded by Empress Kezuhun
