= Empress Dowager Kezuhun =

Empress consort of Former Yan
- Tenure: 353–360
- Spouse: Murong Jun
- Issue: Murong Ye, Crown Prince Xianhuai; Murong Wei; Murong Chong

Empress Kezuhun (Chinese: 可足渾皇后, personal name unknown) (fl. 4th century) was an empress consort and empress dowager of the Xianbei-led Former Yan dynasty of China. Her husband was Murong Jun (Emperor Jingzhao), who was succeeded by their son Murong Wei (Emperor You).

== During Murong Jun's reign ==
Nothing is recorded about Lady Kezuhun's early life and background, but according to later research, her family was likely an influential clan among the Wuhuan people. She appeared to have been Murong Jun's wife when he was his father Murong Huang (Prince Wenming)'s heir apparent. In 353, after he had claimed imperial title, he created her empress. His son Murong Ye (慕容瞱), whom he created crown prince that year, appeared to be her son. After Murong Ye died in 356, he created her younger son Murong Wei crown prince in 357. She appeared to exert some political influence during his reign, and in 358, after Princess Duan, the wife of Murong Jun's brother Murong Chui the Prince of Wu was disrespectful to her, it might have been at her instigation that the eunuch Nie Hao (涅浩) falsely accused Princess Duan of witchcraft, leading to Princess Duan's arrest and death. Murong Chui then married Princess Duan's younger sister as the new princess, but Empress Kezuhun forcibly deposed her and forced him to marry her younger sister. Murong Chui did not dare to refuse but was displeased, and Empress Kezuhun therefore disliked him as well.

== During Murong Wei's reign ==
In 360, Murong Jun died, and Murong Wei succeeded to the throne. He honored his mother as empress dowager, and she was involved in governmental matters, even though Murong Jun's brother Murong Ke the Prince of Taiyuan served as regent, with assistance from Murong Jun's uncle Murong Ping the Prince of Shangyong and Muyu Gen. Muyu, intending to grab more power, initially tried to persuade Murong Ke to seize the throne, and after Murong Ke refused, tried to persuade Empress Dowager Kezuhun that Murong Ke and Murong Ping were intending to rebel. She believed him and was ready to authorize him to strike against the princes, but the young emperor Murong Wei (then age 10) disbelieved him and stopped him from acting. Soon, Murong Ke discovered this and had Muyu put to death, but contrary to Muyu's false accusations, served the empire faithfully until his death in 367. On his death bed, Murong Ke recommended that major military responsibility be given to Murong Chui, but both Empress Dowager Kezuhun, who disliked Murong Chui, and Murong Ping, who feared that Murong Chui would divide his powers, disagreed, and Empress Dowager Kezuhun and Murong Ping thereafter had dominance at court. Both entrusted corrupt officials, and Former Yan's strength, built up by Murong Jun and Murong Ke, began to be sapped.

In 369, probably under Empress Dowager Kezuhun's orders, Murong Wei married the daughter of her cousin Kezuhun Yi (可足渾翼) the Duke of Yuzhang as his empress.

Later that year, the Jin general Huan Wen launched a major attack against Former Yan, defeating forces commanded by Murong Wei's older brother Murong Zang (慕容臧) the Prince of Le'an. Murong Wei sought assistance from Former Qin's emperor Fu Jiān, but at the same time was prepared to abandon the capital Yecheng and flee back to the old capital Helong (和龍, in modern Jinzhou, Liaoning). Murong Chui dissuaded them and volunteered to engage Huan in one more battle. Murong Chui soon defeated Huan and, with the assistance of Former Qin troops under Gou Chi (苟池), nearly annihilated his troops. Former Yan was preserved.

=== End of Former Yan ===
However, Empress Dowager Kezuhun and Murong Ping soon engaged in two damaging decisions. Still resentful of Murong Chui, Empress Dowager Kezuhun denied him and his soldiers rewards and in fact considered killing him. Murong Chui, hearing the news, fled to Former Qin and became a general for Fu Jiān. Further, they reneged on the promise that they made to secure Former Qin assistance—ceding the Luoyang region to Former Qin. In 370, Fu Jiān sent his prime minister Wang Meng to attack Former Yan, and despite being severely outnumbered, Wang defeated Former Yan forces under Murong Ping's command, quickly advancing on Yecheng and capturing it. Soon, Murong Wei, who fled Yecheng, was also captured, ending Former Yan. Oddly, what happened to Empress Dowager Kezuhun was not stated, although presumably when Murong Wei was soon relocated to the Former Qin capital Chang'an, she was relocated there as well.

No further act of the former empress dowager was recorded in history. When, in the aftermaths of Former Qin's defeat at the Battle of Fei River, Murong Chui and Murong Jun's sons Murong Hong and Murong Chong rebelled and tried to reestablish Yan, Murong Wei tried to join them and was executed in 385 along with members of the Murong clan remaining in Chang'an. It is not known whether she survived to that point or survived that incident, but by 386 historical accounts implied that she was no longer living. That year, Murong Chui, having established Later Yan, was ready to reestablish the imperial shrine, and he posthumously demoted her to commoner status and enshrined Murong Jun's concubine Consort Duan instead with Murong Jun.

Chinese royalty
Preceded by Princess Duan	Princess/Empress of Former Yan; 348?–360	Succeeded by Empress Kezuhun (Murong Wei's wife)
Preceded by Empress Dong of Ran Wei	Empress of China (Northern); 353–360	Succeeded by Empress Kezuhun (Murong Wei's wife)
