= Murong Chui =

Emperor of Later Yan from 384 to 396

Emperor Chengwu of Later Yan 後燕成武帝
- Emperor of Yan
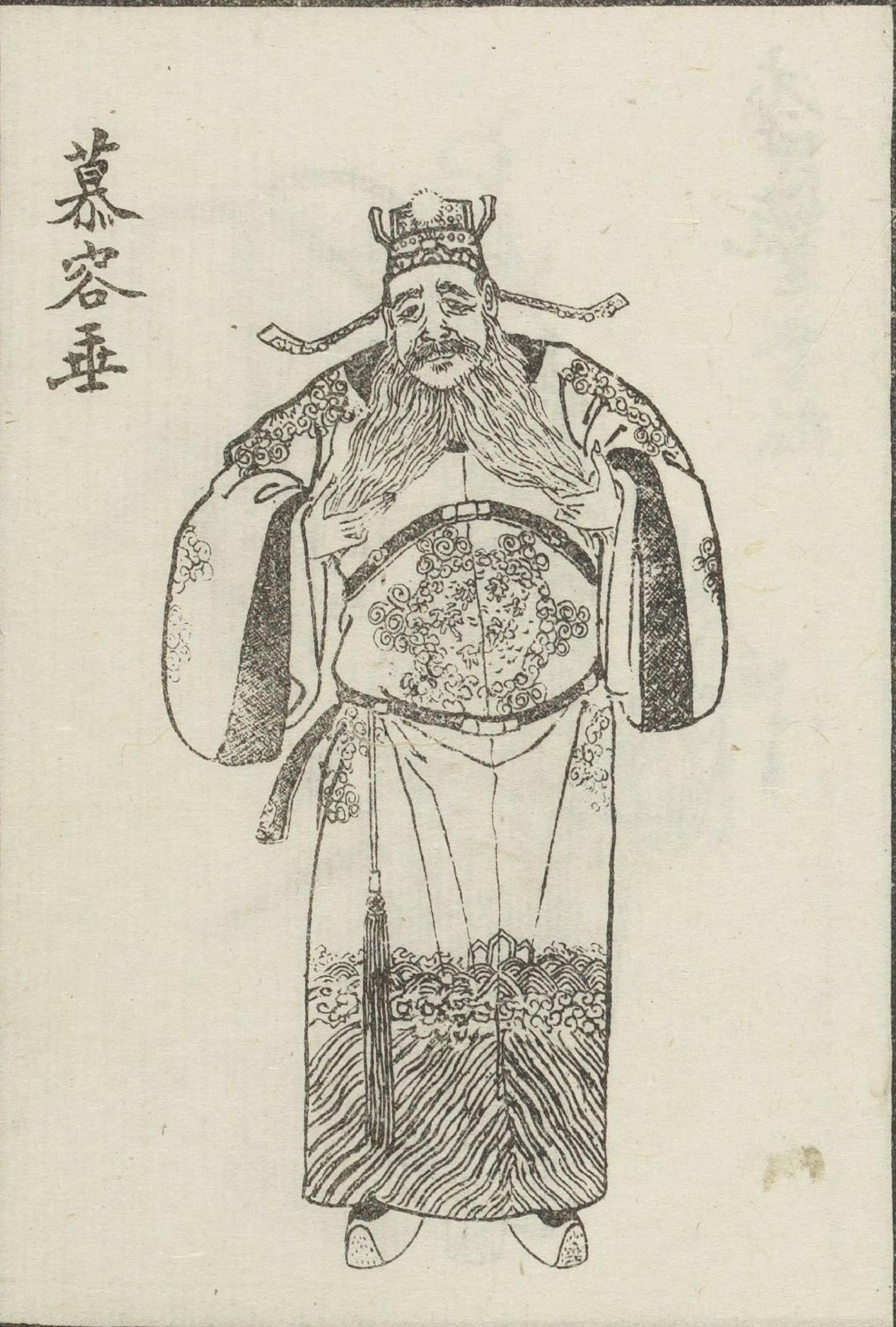

Ruler of Later Yan
- Reign: 9 February 384 – 2 June 396
- Successor: Murong Bao
- Born: 326
- Died: 2 June 396 (aged 70)
- Burial: Xuanping Mausoleum (宣平陵)
- Spouse: Empress Chengzhao; Duan Yuanfei; Consort Duan
- Issue: Murong Ling, Emperor Xianchuang; Murong Nong; Murong Bao; Murong Long; Murong Lin; Murong Xi
Names
- Murong Ba (慕容霸), Murong Que (慕容𡙇), later Murong Chui (慕容垂)
Era name and dates
- Jiànxīng (建興): 386–396
Regnal name
- Grand General, Grand Commander, Prince of Yan (大將軍 大都督 燕王, 384–386); Emperor (since 386)
Posthumous name
- Emperor Chengwu (成武皇帝, lit. "martial and successful")
Temple name
- Shizu (世祖)
- House: Murong
- Dynasty: Later Yan
- Father: Murong Huang

Murong Chui (Chinese: 慕容垂; 326 – 2 June 396), courtesy name Daoming (道明), Xianbei name Altun (阿六敦), also known by his posthumous name as the Emperor Chengwu of Later Yan (後燕成武帝), was the founding emperor of China's Later Yan dynasty. He was originally a general of the Former Yan.

He was a controversial figure in Chinese history, as his military abilities were outstanding, but as he was forced to flee Former Yan due to the jealousies of the regent Murong Ping, he was taken in and trusted by the Former Qin emperor Fu Jian, but later betrayed him and established Later Yan, giving him a reputation as a traitor. His reputation was further damaged as soon after his death, the Later Yan state suffered great defeats at the hands of Northern Wei dynasty's founder Emperor Daowu (Tuoba Gui), leading to the general sense that Murong Chui contributed to the defeats by not building a sound foundation for the empire and by choosing the wrong successor. However he continues to be regarded as a general without parallel during his lifetime for having suffered no defeats throughout his career. Murong Chui's biography in the Book of Jin described him as seven chi and seven cun tall (approximately 1.9 m (6.2 ft)) and having long arms.

== During Former Yan ==
=== During Murong Hui's and Huang's reigns ===
The future Murong Chui was born in 326, while his father Murong Huang was still the heir apparent to Murong Hui the Duke of Liaodong, a vassal of Jin dynasty. He was Murong Huang's fifth son. His mother was Consort Lan, a concubine of Murong Huang. In his youth, he impressed his father with his talent, and he, sometime after succeeding his grandfather as the Duke of Liaodong in 333, wanted to make him the heir apparent. His officials advised against the action (since the general rules of succession requires that the heir apparent be the oldest son of the wife—in this case, his older brother Murong Jun, the oldest son of Duchess Duan), and Murong Huang agreed and made Murong Jun heir apparent, but still favored him greatly and officially named him Murong Ba (慕容霸, Ba meaning hegemon). Because of this, Murong Jun was very jealous of his younger brother.

Murong Ba became a general for his father early, after his father claimed the title of Prince of Yan and established Former Yan, although nominally still being a Jin vassal. In 344, for his contribution in the conquest of the Yuwen tribe, Murong Ba was made the Marquess of Duxiang. Later, Murong Ba was posted to the border with the powerful rival Later Zhao, whose general Deng Heng (鄧恆) was charged with looking for opportunities to conquer Former Yan, and Murong Ba resisted Deng, causing Deng to be unable to launch a campaign. It was during these years that once, on a hunt, he fell off a horse and lost one of his teeth. After Murong Jun succeeded Murong Huang in 348, because he was still jealous of Murong Ba, he renamed Murong Ba—to Murong Que (慕容𡙇, Que means "missing"), but soon found out that Que is a character signifying fortune in prophecies, and therefore again renamed him to Murong Chui, the name that he would be known later by.

=== During Murong Jun's reign ===
Soon after Murong Jun succeeded Murong Huang, Later Zhao collapsed after the death of Shi Hu, as Shi Hu's sons and adoptive grandson Shi Min (who later changed his family name back to his father's original "Ran") engaged in a destructive struggle. Despite the turmoil, Murong Jun was initially hesitant to march south to take over Later Zhao territory, but Murong Chui convinced him that the opportunity was ripe. With Murong Chui as a major generals, Murong Jun advanced south and, after capturing and executing Ran Min in 352, took over the eastern half of former Later Zhao territory. During the next few years, Murong Chui participated in subduing many former Later Zhao generals who were still semi-independent. In the winter of 352, Murong Jun formally declared himself independent from the Jin, as emperor, and in 354, when making titles for many of his sons, brothers, and uncles princes, he made Murong Chui the Prince of Wu.

However, Murong Jun continued to be jealous of Murong Chui's talents. He briefly made Murong Chui the defender of the important city and former capital Longcheng (龍城, in modern Jinzhou, Liaoning), but after it became clear that Murong Chui was ruling the region successfully and garnered the support of the people, Murong Jun became fearful and recalled him to the new capital Yecheng (鄴城, in modern Handan, Hebei).

In 358, Murong Chui would lose his wife Princess Duan to political intrigue. Princess Duan, being the daughter of Duan Mobo and therefore derived from the royal family of Duan tribe, was proud of her bloodline and disrespectful to Murong Jun's wife Empress Kezuhun. Perhaps at Empress Kezuhun's instigation, the eunuch Nie Hao (涅浩) falsely accused Princess Duan of witchcraft. Murong Jun had her and her alleged coconspirator, Murong Chui's assistant Gao Bi (高弼), arrested.

Princess Duan and Gao were tortured, but they refused to admit the charges of witchcraft, and because of this the torture was intensified. Murong Chui was saddened by his wife's suffering, and he sent her a message trying to persuade her to end her suffering by admitting to the charge (and thus end the torture but be sentenced to death). Princess Duan remarked:

I am not fearful of death. However, if I falsely implicate myself, I admit to treason. I would be betraying my ancestors and dragging Your Royal Highness into this disaster. The results are dire, and I will not do this.

As she was interrogated, Princess Duan replied logically and openly, and Murong Chui was able to avoid being dragged into the case, but she still died in prison, either from the torture or a secret execution.

Murong Chui then married her sister as his new princess. However, after a brief time, Empress Kezuhun ordered that the new Princess Duan be deposed, and she married her sister, the Lady of Chang'an, to Murong Chui as his new princess. Murong Chui did not dare to refuse, but he was displeased, and Empress Kezuhun became even more resentful of him. Because of this, Murong Chui was briefly effectively exiled to be the governor of remote Ping Province (平州, modern eastern Liaoning). He was only recalled when Murong Jun became ill in 359.

In 360, Murong Jun died. He was succeeded by his son and crown prince Murong Wei, with Murong Jun's younger brother and Murong Chui's older brother Murong Ke, Prince of Taiyuan as regent.

=== During Murong Wei's reign ===
==== During Murong Ke's regency ====
Unlike Murong Jun, Murong Ke trusted Murong Chui and consulted him on many decisions—including what to do with Muyu Gen when Muyu Gen conspired against him in 360. Later that year, he sent Murong Chui to pacify southern provinces which became disturbant in light of Murong Jun's death. In 365, he assisted Murong Ke in capturing the important Jin city of Luoyang, and after doing so became the commander of the southern armies, defending against possible Jin counterattacks.

In 367, Murong Ke grew ill, and on his deathbed he advised Murong Wei to let Murong Chui succeed him. He also tried to convince Murong Wei's older brother Murong Zang (慕容臧), Prince of Le'an and his own uncle and co-regent Murong Ping (慕容評), Prince of Shangyong of the wisdom of giving at least the post of commander of the armies to Murong Chui. However, after Murong Ke's death later that year, Murong Ping and Empress Dowager Kezuhun disagreed with his advice, and Murong Ping became regent while the commander of the armies post was given to Murong Wei's brother Murong Chong, Prince of Zhongshan.

==== During Murong Ping's regency ====
Neither Murong Ping nor Empress Dowager Kezuhun trusted Murong Chui, and he was not given important responsibilities. In 368, when four dukes of the rival Former Qin rebelled against its emperor Fu Jian, Murong Chui was one of the advocates for assisting the four dukes, who sought Former Yan assistance, and further taking the opportunity to conquer Former Qin. However, Murong Ping declined to do so, and Former Qin captured and executed the four dukes.

In 369, the Jin general Huan Wen launched a major attack against Former Yan, defeating each Former Yan army sent against him and advancing all the way to Fangtou (枋頭, in modern Hebi, Henan), near Yecheng. Murong Wei and Murong Ping panicked and considered fleeing to the former capital Longcheng. However, Murong Chui volunteered to make one last stand against Huan Wen, and he and his brother Murong De dealt Huan a major defeat. Relief forces from Former Qin (which Former Yan requested) then arrived, and together they dealt Huan another major defeat, ending Huan's hopes of destroying Former Yan.

However, both Murong Ping and Empress Kezuhun grew even more jealous of Murong Chui after his victory and denied his soldiers the rewards that he requested. Murong Ping and Empress Kezuhun further considered executing him. Murong Ke's son Murong Kai (慕容楷) and Murong Chui's uncle Lan Jian (蘭建) suggested that he start a coup, but Murong Chui declined. Instead, he accepted his heir apparent Murong Ling's (慕容令) suggestion, seeking to flee and take over Longcheng to try to force reconciliation with the imperial government.

Murong Chui put his plan in motion in the winter of 369. However, once he left Yecheng, his son Murong Lin, whom he had not favored, fled back to Yecheng to report on him, and Murong Ping sent an army to chase after him. Murong Chui then changed his plan and sought to flee to Former Qin instead. He then scattered his followers and fled back south. On the way, another son Murong Manu (慕容馬奴) wanted to flee back to Yecheng and was killed by him. When he was stopped at the Yellow River, he killed the commander of the guards stopping him, forcing his way to Luoyang, and then fled to Former Qin with the younger Princess Duan, Murong Kai, Lan Jian, Gao Bi and his sons Murong Ling, Murong Bao, Murong Nong, and Murong Long. Princess Kezuhun remained at Yecheng.

== During Former Qin ==
Upon Murong Chui's arrival in Former Qin territory, Fu Jian, who had long considered conquering Former Yan but feared Murong Chui's military ability, was pleased and exited the capital Chang'an to personally welcome Murong Chui. He made Murong Chui the Marquess of Bintu and greatly honored him, despite misgivings by his prime minister Wang Meng. He also made Murong Chui one of his generals.

Later in 369, after Murong Ping refused to cede the Luoyang region to Former Qin, as Former Yan had promised when seeking Former Qin's aid against the Jin, Fu Jian sent Wang to attack Former Yan. Wang requested that Murong Chui's heir apparent Murong Ling accompany him as a guide. After capturing Luoyang in early 370, Wang bribed Murong Chui's attendant Jin Xi (金熙) to give Murong Ling a false message that Murong Chui had heard that Empress Dowager Kezuhun had regretted her actions and that, therefore, he was defecting back to Former Yan. Murong Ling, unable to verify either the truth of the message, decided to defect back to Former Yan. Wang immediately accused Murong Ling of treason, and Murong Chui, in fear, fled, but was captured, although Fu Jian believed that Murong Ling was acting independently and therefore pardoned Murong Chui. Former Yan did not trust Murong Ling and exiled him, and later that year, after he tried to start a rebellion, he was killed in battle after being betrayed by his brother Murong Lin.

Late in 370, after Wang defeated Murong Ping and conquered Former Yan, Murong Chui accompanied Fu Jian to visit the Former Yan capital Yecheng. Initially, he did not hide his disgust to those officials who failed to support him during the struggle with Murong Ping and Empress Dowager Kezuhun, but at Gao Bi's suggestion, he started to treat them with kindness, with the rebuilding of Yan in mind. Still, in 372, he accused Murong Ping of being the root of Former Yan's destruction and requested that Fu Jian avenge Former Yan by executing Murong Ping; Fu Jian did not do so, but effectively exiled Murong Ping by making him the governor of a distant commandery.

In 378, Murong Chui participated in the campaign commanded by Fu Jian's son Fu Pi against the Jin's key city of Xiangyang. In 382, when Fu Jian wanted to launch a major campaign to destroy the Jin and unite China, most officials, including Fu Jian's brother Fu Rong, who succeeded Wang as prime minister after Wang's death in 375, opposed, but Murong Chui and Yao Chang urged for the campaign, and Fu Jian launched his campaign in the fall of 383. However, Former Qin forces, commanded by Fu Rong, was defeated by Jin forces at the Battle of Fei River despite great numerical superiority; Fu Rong was killed, and almost the entire army collapsed—although the forces under Murong Chui's command remained intact, and Fu Jian, who suffered an arrow wound during the defeat, fled to Murong Chui. Murong Chui's son Murong Bao and brother Murong De both tried to persuade Murong Chui to kill Fu Jian while he had the power to, but Murong Chui instead returned his forces to Fu Jian's command and returned to Luoyang with Fu Jian. However, under suggestion by his son Murong Nong, he planned a rebellion to rebuild Yan.

Murong Chui told Fu Jian that he was fearful that the people of the Former Yan territory would rebel, and that it would be best if he led a force to pacify the region. Fu Jian agreed, despite opposition by Quan Yi (權翼). Murong Chui took the army and arrived at Yecheng, which was being defended by Fu Pi. They suspected each other, but each ruled out ambushing the other. When the Dingling chief Zhai Bin (翟斌) rebelled and attacked Luoyang, guarded by Fu Pi's younger brother Fu Hui (苻暉), Fu Pi ordered Murong Chui to put down Zhai's rebellion, and Fu Pi sent his assistant Fu Feilong (苻飛龍) to serve as Murong Chui's assistant. On the way to Luoyang, however, Murong Chui killed Fu Feilong and his Di soldiers and prepared to openly rebel. Meanwhile, despite his suspicion of Murong Chui, Fu Pi did not put Murong Chui's son Murong Nong and nephews Murong Kai and Murong Shao (慕容紹) under surveillance, and the three fled from Yecheng and started a rebellion of their own.

In the spring of 384, Murong Chui, not yet in open rebellion against Former Qin, arrived at Luoyang, but Fu Hui, hearing of Fu Feilong's death, refused to welcome him. Murong Chui then entered into an alliance with Zhai Bin, who urged him to take imperial title. Murong Chui refused at this point (reasoning that he should welcome Murong Wei back as emperor) but accepted the title of Prince of Yan, formally breaking away from Former Qin and establishing Later Yan.

== Reign as Later Yan's emperor ==
=== Rebellion from Former Qin ===
Immediately, the struggle was on for Murong Chui to capture the territory that was formerly Former Yan's. Both he and Murong Nong quickly captured many cities. Luoyang and Yecheng were isolated. Fu Pi tried to persuade him to stop his rebellion, but he refused, and instead tried to persuade Fu Pi to leave Yecheng with his forces intact; Fu Pi refused, and Murong Chui put Yecheng under siege. With Former Qin now facing further rebellion by Murong Chui's nephews Murong Hong and Murong Chong, and Yao Chang, in the west, Yecheng was unable to receive any reinforcements, but Murong Chui was still unable to capture it quickly. When Zhai Bin, in disappointment over not being given a prime ministerial title, considered switching sides again to Former Qin, Murong Chui killed him. Zhai Bin's nephew Zhai Zhen (翟真) rebelled against Later Yan, and for the next several years, while battling Former Qin remnants, Murong Chui also had to battle Dingling forces under Zhai Zhen and later his cousins Zhai Cheng (翟成) and Zhai Liao. Briefly in early 385, he also had to battle Jin forces, which had taken most of the territory south of the Yellow River and was in a temporary alliance with Fu Pi. The future of his Later Yan state did not appear particularly bright at this point. However, after moving north to pacify most of modern Hebei, Murong Chui was eventually able to take Yecheng late in 385 when Fu Pi abandoned it and moved west. (Fu Pi, upon hearing that Fu Jian had died earlier that year at Yao's hand, then declared himself emperor, but did not pose a further threat to Later Yan.) While isolated pockets of Former Qin resistance remained, by the end of 385 Former Yan was largely in control of the territory north of the Yellow River and east of Taihang Mountains.

=== Entrenchment of Later Yan ===
Around new year 386, Murong Chui decided to make Zhongshan (中山, in modern Baoding, Hebei), which his nephew Murong Wen (慕容溫), Prince of Lelang had managed to rebuild despite the warfare, his capital. He also claimed the title of emperor.

In 386, Tuoba Gui, the descendant of the Dai royal house, who had reestablished Dai earlier that year but subsequently claimed the title Prince of Wei (thus establishing Northern Wei) but faced internal rebellions and turmoil, submitted to Murong Chui as a vassal and sought Later Yan aid. Murong Chui sent Murong Lin to help him, and Northern Wei was preserved.

In 387, Murong Chui's youngest son Murong Rou (慕容柔), and Murong Bao's sons Murong Sheng and Murong Hui (慕容會) fled back from Western Yan, which had been entrenched in modern Shanxi and whose emperor Murong Yong was a distant relative of Murong Chui's and who thus greatly suspected Murong Rou and his nephews. Later that year, all descendants of Murong Chui and Murong Jun remaining in Western Yan were massacred by Murong Yong.

Later in 387, Murong Chui personally attacked Zhai Liao, who was then occupying Liyang Commandery (黎陽, roughly modern Hebi, Henan), and Zhai Liao submitted to him. However, later that year, Zhai Liao rebelled again, and when Zhai Liao made another overture to submit in 388, Murong Chui refused, and Zhai Liao declared himself the "Heavenly King" (Tian Wang) of Wei.

In 388, Murong Chui, at age 62, transferred much of his day-to-day authority to Murong Bao, now his crown prince, only deciding the most important matters personally. He created his now-wife Duan Yuanfei—the niece of two of his deceased wives—empress.

=== Deterioration of the state ===
In 391 Tuoba Gui sent his brother Tuoba Gu (拓跋觚) to Later Yan to offer tribute, and Murong Chui's sons detained Tuoba Gu and ordered Tuoba Gui to offer horses to trade for Tuoba Gu's freedom. Tuoba Gui refused and broke off relations with Later Yan, instead entering into an alliance with Western Yan.

In 392, after Zhai Liao's son and successor Zhai Zhao attacked Later Yan's border region, Murong Chui personally led an army against Zhai Zhao's capital Huatai (滑台, in modern Anyang, Henan). Zhai sought aid from Western Yan, but Murong Yong declined to send a relief force, and Murong Chui quickly crossed the Yellow River and captured Huatai, conquering Zhai's Wei state.

In the winter of 393, Murong Chui turned his attention to Western Yan. After leading Murong Yong to believe he would attack Western Yan's capital Zhangzi (長子, in modern Changzhi, Shanxi) through Taihang Pass (太行, in modern Jiaozuo, Henan), he instead surprised Western Yan by attacking through Tianjing Pass (天井關, in modern Handan, Henan), quickly advancing on Zhangzi and began besieging it. Murong Yong sought aid from the Jin and Northern Wei, but before the Jin and Northern Wei forces could arrive, Murong Chui captured Zhangzi, killing Murong Yong and annexing Western Yan territory into Later Yan.

In 395, in response to Northern Wei's continuous pillaging of the border region, Murong Chui sent Murong Bao, Murong Nong, Murong Lin, Murong De, and Murong Shao to lead a 90,000~ men army in a punitive expedition against Northern Wei, with Murong Bao in command. Tuoba Gui withdrew his forces out of his capital Shengle (盛樂, in modern Hohhot, Inner Mongolia) to the west of the Yellow River. Murong Bao's forces gave chase and eventually became worn out, and Tuoba Gui announced rumors that Murong Chui had died, causing the soldiers to become worried. Meanwhile, some of Murong Lin's supporters considered a coup to support Murong Lin as emperor, and while Murong Lin himself was not involved, mutual suspicions emerged. Murong Bao therefore decided to retreat, not realizing that Tuoba Gui was shadowing his army in the dark winter cold. In the winter of 395, Northern Wei forces ambushed the unsuspecting Later Yan forces at the Battle of Canhe Slope, killing many soldiers but capturing most. Murong Bao and a number of his generals were able to flee. Initially, Tuoba Gui was going to release the Later Yan soldiers to show generosity, but at Kepin Jian's (可頻建) warning that this would permit Later Yan to rebuild its army quickly, killed the captured Later Yan soldiers.

Murong Bao was humiliated and urged Murong Chui to launch another campaign against Northern Wei, and Murong De also urged Murong Chui to do so. He therefore summoned his son Murong Long, Prince of Gaoyang and grandson Murong Sheng back to the capital Zhongshan with reinforcements from the northern part of the empire, ready to launch another attack against Northern Wei in 396. Murong Chui then launched the attack, quickly capturing Northern Wei's important city Pingcheng (平城, in modern Datong, Shanxi) and aimed for Shengle, and Tuoba Gui, in panic, considered abandoning Shengle again. When Murong Chui led his army through the Canhe Slope, however, the soldiers saw the bodies of the dead soldiers and began to cry bitterly, and Murong Chui became so enraged and embarrassed that he grew extremely ill. In response, the Later Yan forces began to withdraw, and on the way back to Zhongshan, Murong Chui died at Shanggu (上谷, in modern Zhangjiakou, Hebei). His death was not announced until the army reached Zhongshan, however, and he was buried with imperial honors. Murong Bao succeeded him, but in less than a year most of Later Yan would fall into Northern Wei's hands.

== Personal information ==
- Father
  - Murong Huang (Prince Wenming of Former Yan)
- Mother
  - Consort Lan, posthumously honored as Empress Wenzhao
- Wives
  - Princess Duan (died in prison 358), daughter of Duan Mobo (段末柸), posthumously honored as Empress Chengzhao, mother of Heir Apparent Ling and Crown Prince Bao
  - Princess Kezuhun (married 358, effectively divorced 369), sister of Empress Kezuhun, wife of Murong Jun (Emperor Jingzhao of Former Yan)
  - Princess Duan (initially married and forced to be deposed 358, became wife again 369), the sister of the first Princess Duan
  - Empress Duan Yuanfei (created 388, committed suicide 396), niece of Princesses Duan, mother of Princes Lang and Jian
- Major Concubines
  - Consort Duan, mother of Prince Xi
- Children
  - Murong Ling (慕容令) or Murong Quan (慕容全), the heir apparent (killed in battle 370), posthumously honored the Emperor Xianzhuang by his nephew Murong Sheng (Emperor Zhaowu)
  - Murong Bao (慕容寶), the Crown Prince (created 384), later Emperor Huimin
  - Murong Manu (慕容馬奴) (executed 369)
  - Murong Nong (慕容農), Prince Huanlie of Liaoxi (created 386, killed by rebels in 398)
  - Murong Long (慕容隆), Prince Kang of Gaoyang (created 386, killed by Murong Hui 397)
  - Murong Lin (慕容麟), the Prince of Zhao (created 386, killed by Murong De 398)
  - Murong Rou (慕容柔), the Prince of Yangping (created 387)
  - Murong Xi (慕容熙), the Prince of Hejian (created 393), later Emperor Zhaowen
  - Murong Lang (慕容朗), the Prince of Bohai (created 393, killed by rebels of Duan Sugu 397)
  - Murong Jian (慕容鑒), the Prince of Boling (created 393, killed by rebels of Duan Sugu 397)
  - Murong Wonu (慕容倭奴), the Prince of Luyang (captured by Northern Wei 395 and presumptively killed)

== Popular culture ==
- Portrayed by Kim Dong-hyun in the 2011-2012 KBS1 TV series Gwanggaeto, The Great Conqueror.

Emperor Wucheng of (Later) Yan House of Murong Born: 326 Died: 396
Regnal titles
Recreated Title last held by Murong Wei as Emperor of Former Yan	Emperor of Later Yan; 384–396	Succeeded by Murong Bao
Chinese royalty
Recreated Last known title holder: Sun Quan	Prince of Wu; 354–370	Unknown
Titles in pretence
Preceded by Fu Jiān	— TITULAR — Emperor of China; 384–396; Reason for succession failure: Sixteen Kingdoms	Succeeded by Murong Bao
Preceded by Murong Yong	— TITULAR — Emperor of China; 384–396; Reason for succession failure: Sixteen Kingdoms	Succeeded by Murong Bao
