= Murong Wei =

Emperor You of Former Yan 前燕幽帝

Emperor of Former Yan
- Reign: February 17, 360 – 370
- Predecessor: Murong Jun
- Regent: Murong Ke (360–367); Murong Ping (368–370)
- Born: 350
- Died: 385 (aged 34–35); Chang'an, Former Qin
Full name
- Family name: Mùróng (慕容); Given name: Wěi (暐)
Era name and dates
- Jìanxī (建熙): February 17, 360 – 370
Posthumous name
- Emperor Yōu (幽皇帝)
- House: Murong
- Dynasty: Former Yan

Murong Wei (Chinese: 慕容暐; 350 – c.January 385), courtesy name Jingmao (景茂), also known by his Southern Yan-accorded posthumous name as the Emperor You of Former Yan (前燕幽帝), was the last emperor of the Xianbei-led Chinese Former Yan dynasty. He became emperor at age 10 and, late in his reign, with powers in the hands of his mother Empress Dowager Kezuhun and his incompetent and corrupt granduncle Murong Ping, was captured by Former Qin's prime minister Wang Meng in 370, ending Former Yan. Later, during the middle of Former Qin's collapse after its defeat at the Battle of Fei River in 383, he tried to join his brother Murong Chong in rebellion and was executed by Emperor Xuanzhao of Former Qin in early 385.

== Early life ==
Murong Wei was born in 350, during the reign of his father Murong Jun, one year before he claimed the title of emperor. His mother was Murong Jun's wife Empress Kezuhun. At that time, his older brother Murong Ye (慕容曄) was the crown prince. In 354, he was created the Prince of Zhongshan.

In 356, Murong Ye, who was considered an able crown prince, died. In 357, Murong Jun created the seven-year-old Murong Wei crown prince to replace Murong Ye, probably because Murong Wei was born of Empress Kezuhun, as he had other sons who were older. In 359, at an imperial feast, Murong Jun remembered Crown Prince Ye and was weeping. One of Murong Ye's prior subordinates, Li Ji (李績), gave a thorough praise of Murong Ye's eight virtues. Murong Jun then asked him what his opinion was of Murong Wei, and Li gave this response:

The Crown Prince has talent given by Heaven, and is complete in his eight virtues. However, he has two shortcomings that he needs to self-examine: his overindulgence in hunting and music. Both of these have harm for the state.

Murong Wei, who was also present and was told by Murong Jun to review himself, bore grudges from Li from this point on.

In early 360, Murong Jun grew ill, and because Murong Wei was still just a child, he offered the throne to his able brother Murong Ke the Prince of Taiyuan. However, Murong Ke declined and persuaded Murong Jun that he would be able to also ably assist the young emperor. Murong Jun therefore entrusted Murong Wei to Murong Ke, his uncle Murong Ping, Yang Wu, and Muyu Gen, but with Murong Ke in the role of regent. He died soon after, and Murong Wei succeeded him.

== Regency of Murong Ke ==
Muyu Gen, a senior official, was unhappy to be subordinate to Murong Ke, and he soon falsely informed Murong Wei and his mother Empress Dowager Kezuhun that Murong Ke and Murong Ping were planning a rebellion and asked for authorization to attack them. Empress Dowager Kezuhun believed him, but Murong Wei did not and refused to authorize his actions. Murong Ke soon found out, and executed Muyu and his clan.

Murong Ke was an able regent in both governance and military matters, and Former Yan's territorial expansion continued gradually during his regency, largely at Jin's expense. Murong Ke made all major decisions, but when he tried to promote Li Ji, Murong Wei refused, stating "Uncle, you can rule on every important matter of state, but I will rule on Li"—and sent Li out of the capital to be a commandery governor as a form of exile. Li died in distress.

In 361, a magician that Murong Wei favored, Ding Jin (丁進), tried to flatter Murong Ke by persuading him to kill Murong Ping. Murong Ke got angry and, despite Murong Wei's favor for him, executed him.

In 365, Murong Ke captured the important city Luoyang from Jin.

In 366, Murong Ke and Murong Ping offered to resign their posts and return all authority to Murong Wei. Murong Wei declined.

In 367, Murong Ke grew ill, and on his deathbed, he recommended that Murong Wei give great responsibilities to another uncle of Murong Wei, Murong Chui the Prince of Wu. However, Murong Ping, who was jealous of Murong Chui's talents, and Empress Dowager Kezuhun, who had personal grudges against Murong Chui, did not agree, and Murong Ping became regent instead, with some of the military responsibilities transferred to Murong Wei's younger brother Murong Chong the Prince of Zhongshan instead.

== Regency of Murong Ping ==
Murong Ping was far less able than Murong Ke, and he was corrupt. Upon hearing about Murong Ke's death, the rival Former Qin's emperor Fu Jiān began considering plans to conquer Former Yan.

Soon, however, Former Yan would apparently have a good chance to conquer Former Qin. In winter 367, Fu Jian's brother Fu Shuang (苻雙) the Duke of Zhao, and cousins Fu Sou (苻廋) the Duke of Wei, Fu Liu (苻柳) the Duke of Jin, and Fu Wu (苻武) the Prince of Yan, rebelled and requested Former Yan resistance, offering to submit to Former Yan. As Fu Sou held the important gateway city of Shancheng (陝城, in modern Sanmenxia, Henan), this opened up the center of Former Qin to Former Yan. However, Murong Ping refused to act, and in late 368, Fu Jiān defeated the four rebel dukes.

In 368 as well, the key official Yue Wan, concerned about the growing corrupt practice by noble families of putting commoners into their fiefs—a practice that would mean that those commoners were only responsible to them, not responsible for paying taxes to the empire, leading to the empire's treasury being so lacking that it was unable to pay its officials—petitioned Murong Wei for a reform ending the practice. Murong Wei approved the reform and put Yue in charge of it, and Yue restored over 200,000 people to the tax-paying ranks. The nobles were all resentful of Yue, who died later in 368—and while most historians believed that he died of natural causes, having been already ill previously -- Jin Shu stated that he was assassinated by Murong Ping, who had much to lose from Yue' reform.

In 369, probably at his mother's instigation, Murong Wei married the daughter of her cousin Kezuhun Yi (可足渾翼) as his empress.

Later that year, the Jin general Huan Wen launched a major attack against Former Yan, reaching Fangtou (枋頭, in modern Hebi, Henan), in the vicinity of Former Yan's capital Yecheng, defeating every army that Former Yan sent against him, including a major one led by Murong Wei's older brother Murong Zang (慕容臧) the Prince of Le'an. Murong Wei and Murong Ping panicked and wanted to abandon Yecheng to flee back to the old capital Helong (和龍, in modern Jinzhou, Liaoning). Murong Chui volunteered, however, to make one last try at resistance, and was put in charge of the army. Meanwhile, Murong Wei also sent a messenger to Former Qin to request assistance, promising to cede the Luoyang region to Former Qin in exchange for assistance. Murong Chui and another uncle of Murong Wei, Murong De the Prince of Fanyang, soon dealt Huan a major defeat, and Former Qin forces arrived as well, dealing Huan another defeat.

However, Murong Ping and Empress Dowager Kezuhun soon engaged in two damaging decisions. Still resentful of Murong Chui (whose wife was her sister but whom he did not favor), Empress Dowager Kezuhun denied him and his soldiers rewards and in fact considered killing him, a decision that Murong Ping concurred in because he was also apprehensive of Murong Chui. Murong Chui, hearing the news, fled to Former Qin and became a general for Fu Jiān. They also refused to cede the Luoyang region to Former Qin, as previously promised. In anger, late in 369, Fu Jian sent a 60,000-men force, commanded by his prime minister Wang Meng, against Former Yan.

In spring 370, Wang first advanced on Luoyang and forced its surrender. He then advanced on Hu Pass (壺關, in modern Changzhi, Shanxi), defeating all Former Yan resistance on the way. He then captured Jinyang (晉陽, in modern Taiyuan, Shanxi). Murong Ping led a 300,000-men strong force against Wang, but apprehensive of Wang, he stopped at Lu River (潞川, in modern Changzhi as well). Wang soon arrived to prepare to face off against him. Murong Wei became confident, however, that Wang would be defeated by sheer numbers, and did not appear concerned.

Meanwhile, Murong Ping made the worst display of his corruption at this time—keeping guards at forests and streams, disallowing commoners and even his own soldiers from cutting firewood or fishing unless they paid a usage fee in either money or silk. He soon had a stash of wealth, but completely lost the morale of his soldiers. Murong Wei, hearing this, sent a messenger to rebuke him and ordering him to distribute the wealth to the soldiers, but the damage was done. In winter 370, the armies engaged, and despite the numerical advantage that Murong Ping had, Wang crushed him, and Murong Ping fled back to Yecheng by himself.

Murong Wei, along with his brothers, abandoned Yecheng, intended to flee back to Helong. However, once he got out of the capital, his guards largely abandoned him, and the few faithful guards who remained were soon killed by bandits. Former Qin forces then arrived and captured him and delivered him to Fu Jiān. Fu Jiān released him but had him formally surrender with his officials, ending Former Yan.

== After Former Yan's fall ==
Murong Wei was relocated with most of his clan to the Former Qin capital Chang'an. Fu Jiān created him the Marquess of Xinxing and made him a general. In 378, he participated in the campaign of Fu Jiān's son Fu Pi in sieging Jin's important border city Xiangyang. In 383, he also participated in Fu Jiān's massive campaign against Jin, through which Fu Jiān hoped to destroy Jin finally and unite China. After the defeat at the Battle of Fei River, however, Fu Jiān's forces collapsed, and, after Murong Chui, at that time, declined to start an uprising to reestablish Yan, Murong De tried to persuade Murong Wei to do so, but Murong Wei declined as well and accompanied Fu Jiān back to Chang'an.

In spring 384, however, Murong Chui would in fact start an uprising in the eastern empire (Former Yan's territory), and soon was joined by many former Former Yan nobles and officials in establishing Later Yan. Upon hearing this, Murong Wei's brothers Murong Hong and Murong Chong also rose in rebellion near Chang'an. Murong Hong sent a messenger demanding that Fu Jiān send Murong Wei to him—offering to leave the Guanzhong region if Murong Wei were released. Fu Jiān became angry and rebuked Murong Wei, and Murong Wei pleaded and promised to continue to be a faithful subject. Fu Jiān allowed him to remain his in post, but Murong Wei, whom Fu Jiān told to write letters to Murong Chui, Murong Hong, and Murong Chong, ordering their surrender, instead secretly sent a message to Murong Hong, in which he stated:

I am a man within an iron cage, and there is no reason for me not to die. Further, I also sinned against Yan, and you should not mind me. You should earnestly seek to establish yourself.

Murong Hong was soon assassinated, however, and Murong Chong became the leader of the Xianbei rebels who would eventually be known as Western Yan. He put Chang'an under a siege and demanded that Fu Jiān deliver Murong Wei to him. Meanwhile, Murong Wei and his cousin Murong Su (慕容肅) organized the Xianbei men within Chang'an, preparing to start an uprising to join Murong Chong. In early 385, Murong Wei invited Fu Jiān to his house, under the pretense that his son was getting married, ready to assassinate Fu Jiān at the feast. Fu Jiān agreed to attend, but could not go due to rain, and news of the conspiracy leaked. Fu Jiān summoned Murong Wei and Murong Su to the palace. Murong Su suggested that they refuse and immediately start the uprising. Murong Wei refused, and both went to the palace. Fu Jiān questioned them about their conspiracy, and Murong Wei still tried to deny, but Murong Su, with proud words, admitted, and Fu Jiān executed them, as well as all remaining Xianbei people in the city.

== Personal information ==
- Father
  - Murong Jun (Emperor Jingzhao)
- Mother
  - Empress Kezuhun
- Wife
  - Empress Kezuhun (created 369), daughter of his mother's cousin Kezuhun Yi (可足渾翼)

Murong Wei had at least two grown sons, but presumably they were executed as well.

Emperor You of (Former) Yan House of Murong Born: 319 Died: 385
Regnal titles
| Preceded by Murong Jun | Emperor of Former Yan; 360–370 with Murong Ke (360–367); Murong Ping (368–370) | Suspended Title next held by Murong Chui as Emperor of Later Yan |
Titles in pretence
| Preceded by Ran Min | — TITULAR — Emperor of China; 360–370; Reason for succession failure: Annexed by Former Qin | Succeeded by Fu Jiān |
