= Liaoxi (province) =

Former province of China

Liaoxi 遼西
- Province of China
- 1949–1954
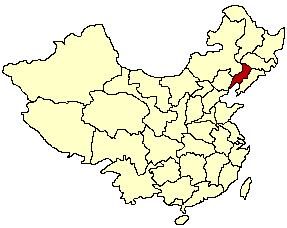
- Location of Liaoxi in China
- Capital: Jinzhou
- History
  - Established: 1949
  - Disestablished: 1954
- Today part of: China; Liaoning; Jilin

Liaoxi (simplified Chinese: 辽西; traditional Chinese: 遼西; pinyin: Liáoxī; Wade–Giles: Liao-hsi; lit. 'West of the Liao') was a former province in Northeast China, located in what is now part of Liaoning and Jilin. It existed from 1949 to 1954, and its capital was Jinzhou.

== Administrative divisions ==
Name	Administrative Seat	Simplified Chinese	Hanyu Pinyin	Subdivisions
Jinzhou	Jinzhou	锦州市	Jǐnzhōu Shì	7 districts
Siping	Siping	四平市	Sìpíng Shì	5 districts
Shanhaiguan	Shanhaiguan	山海关市	Shānhǎiguān Shì	none
Fuxin	Fuxin	阜新市	Fùxīn Shì	3 districts
directly-controlled				21 counties
