= Murong Ping =

4th-century regent in China

Murong Ping (Chinese: 慕容評; before 339 – after 372), noble title Prince of Shangyong (上庸王), was an imperial clan member of the Xianbei-led Former Yan dynasty of China.
