= 394 =

394 in various calendars
- Gregorian calendar: 394; CCCXCIV
- Ab urbe condita: 1147
- Assyrian calendar: 5144
- Balinese saka calendar: 315–316
- Bengali calendar: −200 – −199
- Berber calendar: 1344
- Buddhist calendar: 938
- Burmese calendar: −244
- Byzantine calendar: 5902–5903
- Chinese calendar: 癸巳年 (Water Snake); 3091 or 2884 — to — 甲午年 (Wood Horse); 3092 or 2885
- Coptic calendar: 110–111
- Discordian calendar: 1560
- Ethiopian calendar: 386–387
- Hebrew calendar: 4154–4155
- Hindu calendars
- Vikram Samvat: 450–451
- Shaka Samvat: 315–316
- Kali Yuga: 3494–3495
- Holocene calendar: 10394
- Iranian calendar: 228 BP – 227 BP
- Islamic calendar: 235 BH – 234 BH
- Javanese calendar: 277–278
- Julian calendar: 394; CCCXCIV
- Korean calendar: 2727
- Minguo calendar: 1518 before ROC 民前1518年
- Nanakshahi calendar: −1074
- Seleucid era: 705/706 AG
- Thai solar calendar: 936–937
- Tibetan calendar: ཆུ་མོ་སྦྲུལ་ལོ་ (female Water-Snake); 520 or 139 or −633 — to — ཤིང་ཕོ་རྟ་ལོ་ (male Wood-Horse); 521 or 140 or −632

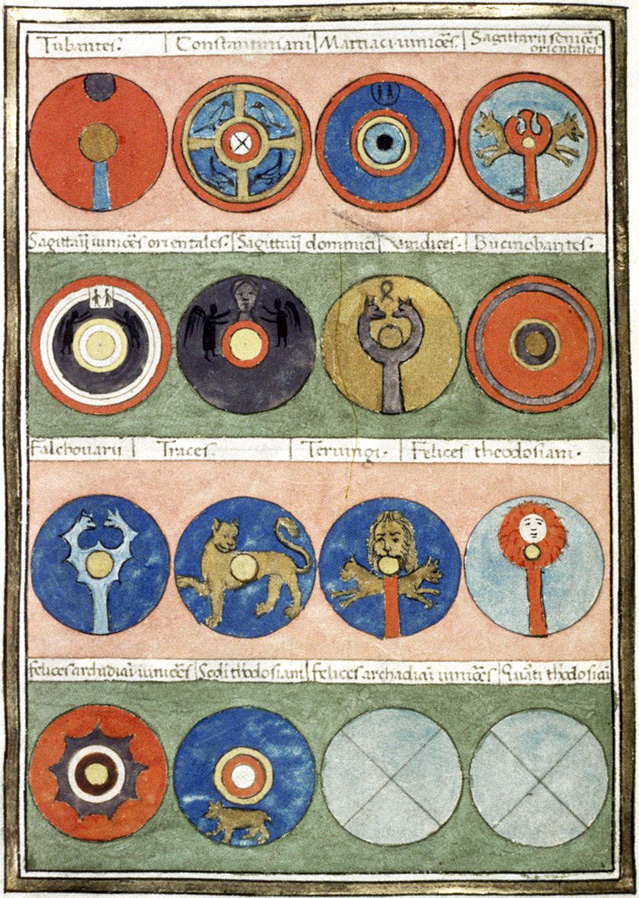
The Notitia Dignitatum, with shields of the Late Roman army

Year 394 (CCCXCIV) was a common year starting on Sunday of the Julian calendar. At the time, it was known in Western Europe as the Year of the Consulship of Flavianus without colleague (or, less frequently, year 1147 Ab urbe condita). The denomination 394 for this year has been used since the early medieval period, when the Anno Domini calendar era became the prevalent method in Europe for naming years.

== Events ==
=== By place ===
==== Roman Empire ====
- September 6 – Battle of the Frigidus: Emperor Theodosius I defeats and kills the usurper Eugenius. The forces of Theodosius are bolstered by numerous auxiliaries, including 20,000 Visigoth federates under Alaric. The Frankish general Arbogast (magister militum) escapes into the Alps and commits suicide.
- Late Roman army: The Notitia Dignitatum shows the development of forces in the Roman Empire. By now 200,000 soldiers guard the borders, and a reserve force of 50,000 is available for deployment. Many non-Roman soldiers are from Germanic tribes: Alamanni, Franks, Goths, Saxons and Vandals.
- Winter – The Huns cross the frozen Danube and destroy the villages built by the Goths. Theodosius I, six hundred miles away in Italy, sends no reinforcements to defend the northern frontier.
- In Rome, the sacred fire stops burning (see Vesta and Vestal Virgins).

==== Egypt ====
- The last known hieroglyphic inscription, known as the Graffito of Esmet-Akhom, is written in Philae, Egypt.

==== China ====
- The last ruler of Former Qin, Fu Chong, is killed in battle against an army of Western Qin, bringing Former Qin to an end.

=== By topic ===
==== Religion ====
- Epiphanius of Salamis attacks Origen's followers and urges John II, Bishop of Jerusalem, to condemn his writings.
- The Council of Bagaï in Africa brings 310 Donatist bishops together.

== Births ==
- Gunabhadra, Indian Buddhist scholar-monk (d. 468)
- Jangsu, Korean king of Goguryeo (d. 491)

== Deaths ==
- September 6 – Eugenius, Roman usurper
- September 8 – Arbogast, Frankish general
- Fu Chong, emperor of the Chinese Di state Former Qin
- Fu Deng, emperor of the Di state Former Qin (b. 343)
- Murong Yong, emperor of the Xianbei state Western Yan
- Virius Nicomachus Flavianus, Roman historian and politician (b. 334)
- Yao Chang, emperor of the Qiang state Later Qin (b. 331)
