= Qin Wang =

Qin Wang (秦王, King/Prince of Qin or King/Prince Qin) may refer to:

== Chinese royalty ==
=== Zhou dynasty ===
- King Huiwen of Qin, ruled 338 BC – 311 BC, son of Duke Xiao of Qin
- King Wu of Qin, ruled 310 BC – 307 BC
- King Zhaoxiang of Qin, ruled 306 BC – 251 BC
- King Xiaowen of Qin, ruled 250 BC
- King Zhuangxiang of Qin, ruled 250 BC – 247 BC, father of Qin Shi Huang

=== Qin dynasty ===
- Qin Shi Huang, ruled 246 BC – 221 BC as King of Qin before declaring as First Emperor
- Fusu, first son of Qin Shi Huang who committed suicide
- Ziying of Qin, self-reverted his title to King of Qin prior to the collapse of Qin dynasty

=== Sixteen Kingdoms ===
- Fu Hong, self-proclaimed to be the Prince of Three Qins
- Fu Jian, founding emperor of the Former Qin state
- Yao Chang, self-proclaimed to be the Prince 10,000 Years of Qin
- Dou Chong, Former Qin general who broke away in 393
- Qifu Guoren, founding prince of the Western Qin state
- Qifu Gangui, second prince of the Western Qin state
- Qifu Chipan, third prince of the Western Qin state
- Qifu Mumo, last prince of the Western Qin state

=== Southern and Northern Dynasties ===
- Helian Chang, created in 430, former ruler of the Xia state

=== Sui dynasty ===
- Yang Jun (prince) (died 600), third son of Emperor Yang of Sui
- Yang Hao (prince) (died 618), puppet prince for Yuwen Huaji

=== Tang dynasty ===
- Emperor Taizong of Tang, second emperor of Tang dynasty

=== Song dynasty ===
- Qian Chu (posthumously), former king of Wuyue
- Zhao Defang, fourth son of Emperor Taizu of Song

=== Yuan dynasty ===
- Manggala (1242–1280), third son of Kublai
- Ananda (1273–1307), first son of Manggala
- Altan Buqa (d. 1323), second son of Manggala

=== Ming dynasty ===
- Zhu Shuang (1356–1395), second son of the Hongwu Emperor

== Games ==
- Prince of Qin (video game)

== See also ==
- Qin (state)
- Qin dynasty
- Former Qin
- Later Qin
- Western Qin
- Three Qins
