= Yao Shuode =

Duke and military general in Later Qin dynasty

- 姚碩德

Chief Controller of the Longyou (都督隴右諸軍事)
- In office 386–?
- Monarch: Yao Chang

Grand General Who Conquers the West (征西大將軍)
- Monarch: Yao Xing

Personal details
- Born: Before 352
- Died: Before 412
- Relations: Yao Chang (brother); Yao Xing (nephew)
- Parent: Yao Yizhong (father)
- Peerage: Duke of Longxi (隴西公)

Yao Shuode (fl. 352–412) was a duke and military general of the Later Qin dynasty during the Sixteen Kingdoms period. He was the younger brother of Yao Chang and the uncle of Yao Xing. During the early years of Later Qin, Shuode helped his brother in his war against the Former Qin, and later, he became one of the empire's top generals after his nephew ascended the throne. He led several western campaigns, resulting in the annexation of the Western Qin along with the nominal submissions of the four Liangs (Later, Southern, Northern and Western) and Chouchi.

== Background ==
Yao Shuode was one of the 42 sons of Yao Yizhong, a Qiang chieftain and general of the Later Zhao dynasty who died in 352. The Yao clan came under the service of the Former Qin after his elder brother, Yao Chang surrendered to them in 357. During his time with the Former Qin, Shuode was placed in charge of the Qiang tribes garrisoned in the Longshang (隴上; north of present-day Shaanxi and west of present-day Gansu).

== Service under Yao Chang ==
In 384, Yao Chang led a rebellion against the Former Qin. In support of his brother, Shuode declared himself the General Who Conquers the West and based himself at Jicheng (冀城; in present-day Gangu County, Gansu). He appointed his elder brother, Yao Sunxiang (姚孫詳) as General Who Stabilises Distant Lands and his great-nephew Yao Xun (姚訓) as General Who Pacifies the West before sending them to capture Longcheng (隴城, in modern Qin'an County, Gansu) and Chiting (赤亭; west of present-day Longxi County, Gansu) respectively. For the next two years, he was locked in a stalemate with Former Qin's Inspector of Qin province, Wang Tong and Inspector of He province, Mao Xing.

After Yao Chang entered Chang'an and declared himself emperor in July or August 386, Shuode joined forces with his brother to defeat Wang Tong. The deadlock was finally broken as the Chuge tribes in Tianshui along with the Qiang and many other tribes in Lüeyang brought their forces to join Yao Chang. In September or October, Wang Tong surrendered to the Later Qin. Yao Chang then appointed Yao Shuode as the Chief Controller of the Longyou, General Who Attacks the West and the Inspector of Qin province, with Shanggui acting as his new base.

In October or November, the Emperor of Former Qin, Fu Deng attacked Yao Shuode in Qin province. Yao Chang came to his rescue, but he was badly defeated by Fu Deng at Hunu Mound (胡奴阜; west of modern-day Tianshui, Gansu) and injured by an arrow. He then retreated to defend Shanggui, where he placed his forces under Shuode's command.

In April or May 387, under pressure by the Duke of Chouchi and Fu Deng's ally, Yang Ding, Shuode decided to retreat to defend Jingyang. Yang Ding and the Former Qin's Prince of Lu, Fu Zuan then attacked and greatly routed him at Jingyang. However, Yao Chang brought his troops from Yinmi (陰密; west of modern-day Lingtai County, Gansu) to aid Shuode, and the enemy forces withdrew. Shuode was transferred to guard Anding in August or September 389, after Yao Chang won the crucial Battle of Dajie, though a month later, he was sent back to Qin province to recruit local officials. In 391, Shuode participated in Yao Chang's victory over Fu Deng at Matou Plains (馬頭原), and in 392, as Yao Chang became bedridden in Chang'an, he was garrisoned to defend Lirun (李潤; northwest of modern-day Dali County, Shaanxi).

== Service under Yao Xing ==
=== Yao Xing's ascension ===
Yao Chang eventually died in new year 394 and was succeeded by his eldest son, Yao Xing. Now under his nephew's authority, Shuode was ordered to guard Yinmi. Shuode was already a highly distinguished general and was in command of the empire's strongest forces. A subordinate of his warned him that Yao Xing may be planning to get rid of him, and that he should return to Qin province to wait and observe. However, Shuode replied, "The Crown Price (Yao Xing) is broad-minded and wise. He would have not these suspicions. Right now, Fu Deng is yet to be destroyed, and infighting between ourselves would only mean our doom. If I am to die, so be it, but I will not follow your suggestion."

Thus, Shuode went to meet Yao Xing, who treated him with great respect before sending him back. In 395, a year after the Former Qin was destroyed, Shuode was bestowed the title of Prince of Longxi.

=== Pacifying Qin province ===
Previously in 394, a native of Shanggui Commandery, Jiang Ru rebelled against the Later Qin, taking control of the commandery and naming himself the Inspector of Qin province. In 396, Yao Shuode first campaigned in Pingliang against the chieftain, Jin Bao (金豹), fighting and capturing him at Luocheng. Then, he attacked Jiang Ru, who promptly led his forces to surrender. Yao Xing appointed his uncle the Governor of Qin province and acting Colonel Who Protects the Eastern Qiang, stationing him in Shanggui once more.

Soon, a local leader, Qiang Xi (強熙) and a gentry leader from Lüeyang, Quan Qiancheng (權幹城), brought 30,000 soldiers to besiege Shanggui, but Shuode fought and routed them. Qiang Xi fled to the Eastern Jin in the south, while Qiancheng fled west to Chouchi. Shuode pursued and defeated Qiancheng at Lüeyang, forcing him to surrender.

In 399, Yao Xing demoted himself from Emperor to Heavenly King. Thus, Yao Shuode, along with another uncle, Yao Xu, requested their nephew to also demote their princely title. Yao Xing did not allow it at first, but eventually agreed, and Shuode was demoted to Duke of Longxi.

=== Campaign against Western Qin ===
In July or August 400, Yao Shuode led 50,000 soldiers to invade the Western Qin state in the Longxi region. The Western Qin ruler, Qifu Gangui brought his generals to resist the Later Qin invasion. During the campaign, Shuode's supply line was cut off as his soldiers were collecting firewood, which compelled Yao Xing to personally bring reinforcements. An unexpected fog isolated Qifu Gangui from his main army while he was scouting the enemy camps. The Later Qin forces chased after him and won a great victory at Houcheng Valley (侯辰谷). The Later Qin annexed the Western Qin's territory, and a month later, Qifu Gangui surrendered.

=== Campaign against Later Liang ===
In May or June 401, Yao Shuode received envoys from Jiao Lang (焦朗) of the Later Liang, who informed him of the state's deteriorating situation and urged him to come. Shuode reported the situation to Yao Xing and assembled 60,000 troops to march into Later Liang from Jincheng (金城; in modern Yuzhong County, Gansu) accompanied by Qifu Gangui. Shuode's forces passed through Southern Liang territory in Guangwu (廣武郡; around present-day Yongdeng County, Gansu), facing no resistance as their ruler, Lilugu withdrew his forces and avoided them.

Shuode then led his forces straight to the Later Liang capital, Guzang (姑臧, in modern Wuwei, Gansu). Along the way, he greatly routed the Later Liang generals, Lü Chao and Lü Miao (呂邈), capturing the latter. As the Later Liang ruler, Lü Long retreated into his capital, Shuode also received the surrender of another general, Lü Tuo (呂佗) and his followers. As Shuode laid siege to Guzang, the Western Liang, Northern Liang and Southern Liang all offered their nominal submission to the Later Qin.

Shuode treated the people around Guzang kindly and received many of their surrender. He also began dividing up the territory and assigning the local officials to administer them. Anticipating a long siege, he also had his grain supplies rationed and stockpiled. In September or October, Lü Long finally agreed to submit to the Later Qin as a vassal, so Shuode petitioned that he be given an office and a dukely title. He also forbid his soldiers from harming the inhabitants of Guzang and paid respect to the local leaders. Shuode was thus held in high esteem in the western region, but with his supplies running low, he soon returned to Chang'an with the famous Buddhist monk, Kumārajīva, who had been living as a prisoner under the Later Liang.

=== Campaign against Chouchi ===
In June or July 405, Yao Xing sent Shuode to campaign against Chouchi with 30,000 soldiers. Shuode had his general, Yao Shoudu (姚壽都) and others to march from Dangchang while Yao Liancheng (姚斂成) marched from Xiabian (下辯; northwest of present-day Cheng County, Gansu). The Chouchi ruler, Yang Sheng, sent Yang Shou (楊壽) to oppose Liancheng and Yang Bin (楊斌) to oppose Shoudu. However, Shoudu captured Yang Bin and his entire army after a successful counterattack, causing Yang Shou and the others to surrender. After this victory, Shuode decided to withdraw.

Not long after, Yao Xing ordered Shuode to invade Chouchi again, this time with a separate force led by the general, Lian Ju (斂俱) attacking Hanzhong. Shuode and his allies defeated Yang Sheng in a string of victories while Lian Ju conquered Chenggu for Qin. In July or August, Yang Sheng finally submitted to Qin and sent his younger relatives, including his son, Yang Nandang as hostages.

=== Later life and posthumous honours ===
In July or August 406, Yao Shuode came from Shanggui and entered the Qin court in Chang'an. Yao Xing celebrated this occasion by declaring a general amnesty, and when it was time for Shuode to return to his garrison, he accompanied his uncle as far as Yong province before turning back to Chang'an.

Yao Shuode and Yao Xu were both exceptionally favoured uncles of Yao Xing. He would treat the two reverently with the appropriate family rites, while the two would casually refer to him by his courtesy name and were often consulted whenever important state affairs had to be decided. Yao Xing would also gift them the best carriages, horses, clothes and trinkets, only using the remainder for himself afterwards, and even enforced naming taboos within his territory for their names.

The death year of Yao Shuode is not recorded, although it is likely he died some time between 406 and 412. In 412, Yao Xing offered sacrifices at Chang temple (萇廟) in honour of twenty-four late officials, which included Yao Shuode.

== Bibliography ==
- Fang, Xuanling (ed.) (648). Book of Jin (Jin Shu).
- Sima, Guang (1084). Zizhi Tongjian.
