= Fu Chong =

Fu Chong 苻崇
- Emperor of Former Qin

Emperor of Former Qin
- Reign: 394
- Predecessor: Fu Deng
- Successor: Dynasty abolished
- Born: 343 (Note: It is uncertain whether or not Fu Chong was born in 343)
- Died: 394
Names
- Fu Chong (苻崇)
Era name and dates
- Yánchū (延初): 394
- House: Fu (Pu)
- Dynasty: Former Qin

Fu Chong (Chinese: 苻崇; died 394) was the last emperor of the Di-led Former Qin dynasty of China. He assumed the throne in 394 after the death of his father, Fu Deng (Emperor Gao). He later died in battle against the Western Qin dynasty, thus marking the collapse of the Former Qin.

== During Fu Deng's reign ==
Fu Chong was first mentioned in history in 386, when his father assumed imperial title of Former Qin after the death of Fu Pi (Emperor Aiping). In 387, Fu Deng created Fu Pi's son Fu Yi (苻懿) crown prince and created Fu Chong the Prince of Dongping and made him one of the key officials. After Fu Yi died in 388, Fu Chong was created crown prince. His involvements in his father's campaigns against the rival Later Qin's emperor Yao Chang are not completely clear.

In 394, after Yao Chang's death, Fu Deng launched a major attack against Later Qin; he had his brother Fu Guang (苻廣) defend the base of Yongcheng (雍城, in modern Baoji, Shaanxi) and Fu Chong defend the base of Hu Kong Castle (胡空堡, in modern Xianyang, Shaanxi) and, in his anxiety, did not make sure that his army had sufficient water supply. Yao Xing set up his army at Mawei (馬嵬, in modern Xianyang, Shaanxi) to prevent Former Qin forces from reaching the river near Mawei, and Former Qin forces collapsed in thirst. Upon hearing the defeat, Fu Guang and Fu Chong abandoned the two bases that they were holding, and Fu Deng was unable to recapture them. He instead fled to Pingliang and then into the mountains. He sent his son Fu Zong the Prince of Ruyin to the ruler of Western Qin, Qifu Gangui and married his sister to Qifu Gangui as his princess, seeking aid from Qifu Gangui. Qifu Gangui sent his general Qifu Yizhou (乞伏益州) to aid Fu Deng, but as Fu Deng came out of the mountains to join Qifu Yizhou's forces, Yao Xing ambushed and captured him, and then executed him.

== Brief reign ==
Upon hearing his father's death, Fu Chong fled to Huangzhong (湟中, in modern Xining, Qinghai), under Qifu Gangui's control, and declared himself emperor. He created his son Fu Xuan (苻宣) crown prince. However, in winter 394, Qifu Gangui expelled him, and he fled to one of his father's last remaining generals, Yang Ding the Prince of Longxi. Yang led his forces to join Fu Chong's to attack Qifu Gangui. Qifu Gangui sent Qifu Yizhou and two other generals, Qifu Ketan (乞伏軻彈) and Yuezhi Jiegui (越質詰歸) against Yang and Fu Chong, and Yang was initially successful against Qifu Yizhou. However, the three Western Qin generals then counterattacked and killed Yang and Fu Chong in battle. This ended Former Qin, as while Fu Chong's crown prince Fu Xuan then fled to and allied with Yang Ding's cousin and successor Yang Sheng (楊盛), he did not seek to reestablish Former Qin's governmental structure. Fu Xuan was later mentioned in history in 397, when both he and Yang Sheng were given general titles by Jin, in 407, when he led Yang Sheng's army against Later Qin, and in 413, when he was forced by Jin to return to Yang's domain of Chouchi.

== Personal information ==
- Father
  - Fu Deng (Emperor Gao)
- Children
  - Fu Xuan (苻宣), the Crown Prince (created 394)

Emperor Houzhu of (Former) Qin House of Fu Died: 394
Regnal titles
Preceded by Fu Deng	Emperor of Former Qin; 394	Extinct
Titles in pretence
Preceded by Fu Deng	— TITULAR — Emperor of China; 394; Reason for succession failure: Annexed by Western Qin	Succeeded by Qifu Gangui
