= Yang Ding (Chouchi) =

4th-century Duke of Chouchi and Former Qin general

Yang Ding 楊定

Duke of Chouchi (仇池公)
- Reign: 385–394
- Predecessor: Yang Cuan
- Successor: Yang Sheng

Prince of Longxi (隴西王) (self-appointed)
- In office 389 – 394
- Monarch: Fu Deng

Personal details
- Born: Unknown Wudu District, Longnan, Gansu
- Died: 394
- Spouse: Lady Fu
- Parent: Yang Fudu (father)
- Posthumous name: Prince Wu (武王)

Yang Ding (died c.November 394) was a ruler of Chouchi and a military general of Former Qin during the Sixteen Kingdoms period. His family was a part of the Yang clan that ruled Chouchi but fled to Former Qin after they failed to usurp their relatives' throne. Yang Ding became the son-in-law of Qin's ruler, Fu Jian, and after the Battle of Feishui, he became one of the state's most powerful supporters up to its destruction in 394. However, he also took advantage of Qin's period of weakness by restoring the Chouchi state in 385, which had been conquered by Qin in 371. His reign is seen as the start of Later Chouchi (後仇池).

== Early life and background ==
Yang Ding was a Di and a member of the ruling Yang family in Chouchi. His grandfather was Yang Songnu (楊宋奴), who launched a coup in 355 against Chouchi's duke, Yang Chu (楊初). Although, he was initially successful, he was soon killed by Yang Chu's son, Yang Guo (楊國). Songnu's sons, Yang Fudu (楊佛奴) and Yang Fugou (楊佛狗), fled to the neighbouring state of Former Qin, then ruled by Fu Sheng, where they were welcomed and well-received. This Yang Fudu was the father of Yang Ding, and some time after the ascension of Fu Jian in 357, Yang Ding became Fu Jian's son-in-law by marrying one of his daughter. Fu Jian also made him Master of Writing and as General Who Leads The Army in his government. (Note: Some sources say that Yang Songnu was Yang Ding's great-grandfather rather than his grandfather, and that Yang Funu was Yang Ding's grandfather rather than his father. However, Yang Fugou was by all accounts his uncle.)

== Service under Fu Jian and capture by Western Yan ==
Yang Ding came to prominence after the Battle of Feishui in 383. Fu Jian lost the decisive battle against Jin dynasty forces in southern China, and the following year in 384, his generals Murong Chui, Murong Hong and Yao Chang took advantage of his vulnerability and revolted against him. Yang Ding was serving as Fu Jian General who directs the army as of 385, and saw his first action that year against Western Yan forces led by Murong Chong. Yang Ding attacked and routed him, capturing many of the Xianbei in his ranks and executing them.

Later that year, Yang Ding continued to campaign against Murong Chong, who was besieging Fu Jian's capital of Chang'an at the time. He defeated Chong's general Murong Xian between the Ba and Chan Rivers. Yang Ding's reputation was a major concern for Murong Chong, so he created horse-pits to protect himself. Strangely, during the siege, there was a man in Chang'an who kept shouting in the night, "Yang Ding is a bold youth and should be supporting by us, and the palace and ministries should be here with us, but father (Fu Jian) and son (Fu Jian's son, Fu Hong (苻宏)) have both abandoned you," and in the morning, he completely disappeared. Yang Ding continued to fight Murong Chong, but was eventually captured. Fu Jian was greatly afraid, and Yang Ding's defeat convinced him to flee the city.

Yang Ding remained in Western Yan for a couple of months in 385. In that span of time, Fu Jian was captured by Later Qin forces and was executed by Yao Chang's orders. Yang Ding developed a father-son relationship with Murong Chong's close advisor, Gao Gai (高蓋). When Gao Gai attacked Later Qin at the end of the year, he was defeated and surrendered himself to the enemy. Yang Ding was with him during that time, and decided to flee to Longyou (隴右, in modern Haidong Prefecture, Qinghai) and gathered his old followers.

== As Duke of Chouchi ==
After he had left Western Yan, Yang Ding submitted back to Former Qin, now ruled by Fu Jian's son, Fu Pi. Much like the other loyalists, Yang Ding sent a messenger to Fu Pi asking him to lead a joint attack against Later Qin. Fu Pi appointed the loyalists with new positions, with Yang Ding becoming his Governor of Yongzhou. At this point, Fu Pi did not have much power to exert over his commanders, essentially making Yang Ding a warlord. Yang Ding moved his base to Licheng, gathering thousands of subjects under his wing. Once he had enough, he proclaimed himself as Prancing Dragon General and Duke of Chouchi in 385, ending the state's brief non-existence since 371 after it was conquered by Qin. Yang Ding even secured his position by submitting to the Jin dynasty, who approved his titles and vassalage.

Fu Pi was killed by Jin forces in 386 and was succeeded by his relative Fu Deng. In 387, Yang Ding's position pressured Later Qin's general, Yao Shuode into retreating to Jingyang. Both Yang Ding and Fu Zuan (苻纂) attacked him there where he was greatly defeated. Yao Chang personally went to reinforce Shuode after his defeat, causing Yang Ding and Fu Zuan to fall back to Fulu.

In 389, Fu Deng was driven back further east, so Yao Chang decided to re-appoint his officials in Qinzhou. It was at this moment when Yang Ding attacked the province. He captured Longcheng (隴城, in modern Qin'an County, Gansu) and Jicheng (冀城, in modern Gangu County, Gansu) in Tianshui from Yao Cháng (姚常, note the different pinyin) and Xing Nu (邢奴) respectively, beheading the former and capturing the latter. Yao Xiang (姚詳) (Note: not to be confused with Yao Xiang, brother of Yao Chang) abandoned Lüeyang, allowing Yang Ding to completely occupy Qinzhou. Yang Ding declared himself Prince of Longxi, while the Jin dynasty appointed him their Inspector of Qinzhou. Fu Deng approved Yang Ding's title and the one given by Jin. Shortly after his victory, Fu Deng made Yang Ding his Prime Minister of the Left.

Yang Ding ruled Chouchi for another four years. His power was significant enough to catch the concern of Yao Chang's advisors, who saw him as equally threatful as Fu Deng. However, Yang Ding's reign would come to a end in 394. Fu Deng captured and executed by Later Qin, now ruled by Yao Chang's son, Yao Xing, early that year. His son, Fu Chong declared himself as his successor and fled to Yang Ding for help after Western Qin forces drove him out of his territory. Yang Ding led his troops together with Fu Chong against Qifu Gangui. At first, they managed to defeat Qifu Kedan (乞伏軻彈) at Pingchuan but a heavy counter-attack by the Qifus overwhelmed them in the end. Both Yang Ding and Fu Chong were killed in battle, ending Former Qin once and for all.

Yang Ding died childless, but he did have a cousin named Yang Sheng (楊盛) through his uncle Yang Fugou. Yang Ding had left him to guard Chouchi before he left to fight Western Qin, but with Yang Ding now deceased, Yang Sheng succeeded him as Duke of Chouchi along with his other titles from Jin. Sheng posthumously named him 'Prince Wu' (武王).
