= Empress She =

Empress She (蛇皇后, personal name unknown) (died 397) was an empress of the Qiang-led Chinese Later Qin dynasty. Her husband was the founding emperor Yao Chang (Emperor Wuzhao), and she was the mother of Yao Chang's crown prince and successor Yao Xing (Emperor Wenhuan).

Very little is known about Empress She. She was already Yao Chang's wife before he declared imperial title, and when he did in 386, he created her empress and created her son Yao Xing crown prince. After he died in 394 and was succeeded by Yao Xing, she was honored as empress dowager. She died in 397, and Yao Xing was said to be so saddened that he was unable to gather officials for imperial meetings and handle important matters of state, although he eventually did so while still wearing mourning clothes.

To honour his mother, Yao Xing made sacrifices in the Imperial temple.

Chinese royalty
Preceded by None (dynasty founded)	Empress of Later Qin; 386–394	Succeeded by Empress Zhang
Preceded by Empress Gou of Former Qin	Empress of China (Northern/Central Shaanxi); 386–394	Succeeded by Empress Zhang
