= Dou Chong =

Former Qin general

Dou Chong 竇衝/竇沖

King of Qin (秦王)
- Reign: 393 – 394

Prime Minister of the Left (左丞相)
- In office 392 – 393
- Monarch: Fu Deng

Personal details
- Born: Unknown; Wudu District, Longnan, Gansu
- Died: Unknown, possibly in the 5th century CE

Dou Chong (fl. 368–394) was a Di military general and ruler of Former Qin during the Sixteen Kingdoms period. Dou Chong rose to prominence after the Battle of Feishui in 383, remaining loyal to Fu Jian after most of Qin's generals had betrayed the state and becoming a key general. Dou Chong continued his service with Qin under Fu Pi and Fu Deng, but by 393, despite receiving much favour from Fu Deng, he rebelled and declared himself the King of Qin. Dou Chong's Qin only lasted for a year before he was defeated and captured by Later Qin.

== Service under Fu Jian ==
Dou Chong was an ethnic Di from Wudu. It is not known when Dou Chong specifically joined Fu Jian, but he first appeared in the records in 368, during the rebellion of Fu Liu (苻柳), Fu Shuang (苻雙), Fu Sou (苻廋) and Fu Wu (苻武). Dou Chong was serving as the General of the Forbidden Guards of the Left at the time and participated in quelling the rebellion by leading cavalries.

In 380, Fu Jian's cousin, Fu Luo, rebelled against him in Helong (和龍, in modern Jinzhou, Liaoning). Fu Jian sent Dou Chong and Lü Guang to campaign against them. Dou Chong fought Fu Luo at Zhongshan, where he greatly routed and captured him. Dou Chong sent Fu Luo back to the capital, while Lü Guang defeated Fu Luo's remaining followers.

Before the Battle of Feishui in 383, Fu Jian appointed Yao Chang as Prancing Dragon General. Fu Jian jokingly said to him, "Before, I established my rule as the General Longxiang. I do not easily confer this title on others, so take good care of it." However, Dou Chong objected to his playful comment, telling him, "Kings should not joke, this is an ominous sign." Fu Jian made no reply. The Battle of Feishui ended in disaster for Fu Jian, and Former Qin began to fall apart.

As the state disintegrated, Dou Chong remained by Fu Jian's side, serving under Fu Jian's son Fu Rui (苻叡) as his chief clerk. In 384, he helped Fu Rui in his campaign against Murong Hong but was later given personal command by Fu Jian to defeat Hong's brother, Murong Chong at Pingyang, who had also rebelled. Dou Chong defeated Murong Chong at Hedong, causing Murong Chong to abandon his infantry and flee to his brother.

In the middle of 384, Dou Chong feigned surrender to the Jin dynasty. The Jin court appointed Dou Chong as a general but shortly after his appointment, he defected back to Qin and invaded Hanzhong. The Jin administrators, Huangfu Zhao (皇甫釗) and Zhou Xun (周勳) surrendered three counties of Baxi (巴西; around present-day Langzhong, Sichuan) to Dou, and Jin's Inspector of Liangzhou, Zhou Qiong (周瓊) had little troops to resist them. Qiong asked the Inspector of Yuzhou, Zhu Xu for help, so Zhu sent Huangfu Zhen (皇甫貞; not to be confused with Former Yan's Huangfu Zhen) to assist him. The two drove Dou Chong back to the east of Chang'an while both Huangfu Zhao and Zhou Xun were killed.

The following month, Fu Jian led a campaign north against Yao Chang, who had broken away and formed his state of Later Qin. With Dou Chong serving as General of the Left, Fu Jian camped at Fort Zhaoshi (趙氏塢; in present-day Tongchuan, Shaanxi) and defeated Yao Chang numerous times. Dou and his contemporaries also built a weir to cut off Yao Chang's water supply. Yao Chang's men were dying of thirst, so in desperation, he sent his brother, Yao Yinmai (姚尹買), to destroy the weir. However, Dou Chong attacked and beheaded Yinmai, inflicting Later Qin with 13,000 casualties. Yao Chang's army was on the brink of collapse but was saved when a storm occurred to replenish their water.

In early 385, the former emperor of Former Yan and also Murong Hong's brother, Murong Wei, apologized to Fu Jian for the actions of his brothers. In reality, this was a ruse to let his guard down and assassinate him. One of the conspirators involved was Tu Xian (突賢), who had a sister that happened to be Dou Chong's concubine. The two did not get along with each other, and with knowledge of the plot, Tu Xian's sister revealed to Dou Chong of Murong Wei's intentions. Dou Chong immediately notified Fu Jian about it, and when it was revealed that Murong Wei had already got the Xianbei citizens in Chang'an involved in the scheme, Fu Jian executed Murong Wei and massacred the Xianbei in the city.

In 385, Murong Chong sent his general Gao Gai (高蓋) to attack Chang'an. Gao Gai attacked during the night to catch the defenders by surprise, but Dou Chong and others routed him, killing around 800 of Murong Chong's soldiers. There was lack of ration and widespread hunger in Chang'an at the time, so Dou Chong and the generals ordered for the bodies of dead enemies to be carved up and used as food.

== Service under Fu Pi and Fu Deng ==
Chang'an eventually fell to Murong Chong, while Fu Jian was captured and killed by Yao Chang in 385. News of his son, Fu Pi ascending the throne took a while to reach his family members and generals. Once it reached Dou Chong, he quickly occupied Zichuan (兹川; southeast of Chang'an), where he gathered thousands of followers under his command. Dou Chong then submitted to Fu Pi, and he and the other loyalists sent their messengers to Fu Pi asking him to lead a joint attack against Later Qin. Fu Pi appointed Dou Chong as Governor of Liangzhou, and in mid-386, Dou Chong, along with Deng Jing (鄧景), attacked front and rear against Later Qin's Prefect of Pingliang, Jin Xi (金熙).

After Fu Pi was killed in 386, a distant relative of his, Fu Deng, succeeded him. Following the succession, Dou Chong was made Governor of Southern Qinzhou and Grand General of Chariot and Cavalry. Not long after, Dou Chong attacked Later Qin, capturing the cities of Qiancheng (汧城; present-day Long County, Shaanxi) and Yongcheng (雍城; present-day Fengxiang District, Shaanxi) and killing the generals, Yao Yuanping (姚元平) and Zhang Lue (張略). Dou pressed on east from Yongcheng to fight Yao Chang, but was defeated.

In 389, after Fu Deng was forced back into Fort Hukong (胡空堡; in modern day Xianyang, Shaanxi) by Yao Chang, Fu Deng had Dou Chong promoted to Grand Marshal, Chief Controller of Longdong (隴東, roughly modern Baoji, Shaanxi), and Governor of Yongzhou. He then ordered Dou to advance from Fanchuan (繁川; in modern day Xi'an, Shaanxi) to Later Qin's Chang'an to serve as the vanguard in capturing the city. In 391, Fu Deng attacked Chang'an but was once again defeated by Yao Chang.

Dou Chong reached his highest position in Qin in 392, as Fu Deng made him his Prime Minister of the Left. Dou Chong then shifted his base to Huayin. From there, he attacked Jin's Administrator of Pingyang (平陽; in modern Linfen, Shanxi), Zhang Yuanxi (張元熙), at Huangtian Castle (皇天塢). However, he was repelled at Hucheng (湖城; present-day Lingbao City, Henan) by Yang Quanqi.

== As King of Qin ==
Despite the promotions that Fu Deng had given him, Dou Chong was still discontent and wanted to become Prince of Tianshui. Fu Deng refused to give him such a title, which irritated Dou. By the middle of 393, Dou Chong's patience had waned, resulting in him rebelling and declaring himself the King of Qin, thus challenging Fu Deng's claimant. Dou Chong also went as far as to changing the reign era title to the first year of Yuanguang (元光).

Fu Deng responded to Dou Chong's declaration by attacking him at Fort Yeren (野人堡, in modern Pucheng County, Shaanxi), Dou Chong asked Later Qin for aid, and at the advice of Yin Wei, Yao Chang sent his son Yao Xing to help him. Yao Xing attacked Fu Deng's vulnerable defences at Fort Hukong, forcing Fu Deng to lift his siege against Dou Chong. Fu Deng was then ambushed and routed by Yao Xing, sparing Dou Chong from another attack from Former Qin.

The following year in 394, the Later Qin generals Qiang Xi (強熙) and Qiang Duo (強多) revolted against their state and acclaimed Dou Chong as their leader. Yao Xing, now Later Qin's emperor, personally campaigned against Dou Chong and the rebels. Qiang Duo's nephew, Qiang Liangguo (強良國), killed Qiang Duo and submitted back to Yao Xing. Qiang Duo's death caused alarm among the rebels, leading to Qiang Xi and Dou Chong fleeing and parting ways. Dou Chong reached Qianchuan but a Di leader named Chou Gao (仇高) arrested him and sent him to Yao Xing. Dou Chong's cousin, Dou Tong (竇統) surrendered their troops to Yao Xing, ending Dou Chong's state of Qin. Historical records fail to provide information as to what happened to Dou Chong following his capture.
