= 389 =

389 in various calendars
Gregorian calendar	389; CCCLXXXIX
Ab urbe condita	1142
Assyrian calendar	5139
Balinese saka calendar	310–311
Bengali calendar	−205 – −204
Berber calendar	1339
Buddhist calendar	933
Burmese calendar	−249
Byzantine calendar	5897–5898
Chinese calendar	戊子年 (Earth Rat); 3086 or 2879 — to — 己丑年 (Earth Ox); 3087 or 2880
Coptic calendar	105–106
Discordian calendar	1555
Ethiopian calendar	381–382
Hebrew calendar	4149–4150
- Hindu calendars
Vikram Samvat	445–446
Shaka Samvat	310–311
Kali Yuga	3489–3490
Holocene calendar	10389
Iranian calendar	233 BP – 232 BP
Islamic calendar	240 BH – 239 BH
Javanese calendar	272–273
Julian calendar	389; CCCLXXXIX
Korean calendar	2722
Minguo calendar	1523 before ROC 民前1523年
Nanakshahi calendar	−1079
Seleucid era	700/701 AG
Thai solar calendar	931–932
Tibetan calendar	阳土鼠年 (male Earth-Rat); 515 or 134 or −638 — to — 阴土牛年 (female Earth-Ox); 516 or 135 or −637

Year 389 (CCCLXXXIX) was a common year starting on Monday of the Julian calendar. At the time, it was known as the Year of the Consulship of Timasius and Promotus (or, less frequently, year 1142 Ab urbe condita). The denomination 389 for this year has been used since the early medieval period, when the Anno Domini calendar era became the prevalent method in Europe for naming years.

== Events ==
=== By place ===
==== Roman Empire ====
- All pagan buildings in Alexandria, including the library, are destroyed by fire.

== Births ==
- Geiseric, king of the Vandals and Alans (approximate date)

== Deaths ==
- Donatian of Reims (or Donat), Christian bishop and saint
- Florus of Lodève, Christian bishop and martyr (approximate date)
- Mao, Chinese empress and wife of Fu Deng (Former Qin)
