= 389th Division =

389th Division may refer to:

- 389th Infantry Division, Wehrmacht, Germany
- 389th Rifle Division, Soviet Union

== See also ==
- List of military divisions by number
- 389th (disambiguation)
