= Empress Mao (Former Qin) =

Empress Mao (毛皇后, personal name unknown) (died 389) was an empress of the Chinese/Di state Former Qin. Her husband was Fu Deng (Emperor Gao).

== Life ==
She was the daughter of the general Mao Xing (毛興), (Note: This is per Spring and Autumn Annals of the Sixteen Kingdoms; Lady Mao's biography in the Book of Jin recorded that her origins were unknown. The Zizhi Tongjian recorded that Mao Xing and Wang Teng (王腾) established marital ties with the Fu clan.) who served as the governor of He Province (河州, modern southwestern Gansu and eastern Qinghai) during the reign of Fu Jiān (Emperor Xuanzhao). After Former Qin began to disintegrate in 384 following the defeat at the Battle of Fei River, the generals in the western empire began to turn on each other, and in 386, Mao Xing was attacked by the generals Wang Guang (王廣) and Wang Tong (王統), who were brothers. He defeated Wang Guang, but when he was about to attack Wang Tong, his soldiers, worn out by the wars, assassinated him. After an interim command by Wei Ping (衛平), eventually, Fu Deng, a distant relative of Fu Jiān, took over the command of his forces, and was created the Prince of Nan'an by Fu Jiān's son Fu Pi (Emperor Aiping). It might have been at this time that Fu Deng married her, or the marriage might have taken place earlier. (Note: Vol.104 of Zizhi Tongjian recorded that Mao Xing established marital ties with the Fu clan in 380 (5th year of the Tai'yuan era of the reign of Emperor Xiaowu of Jin).)

After Fu Pi was killed by Jin forces in 386, Fu Deng assumed imperial title. In 387, he created her, who at that time carried the title of Princess of Nan'an, empress. She was described to be beautiful and mighty in battle, capable in horsemanship and archery. In 389, however, when Fu Deng was attacking the Later Qin emperor Yao Chang, Yao Chang made a surprise attack against his base Dajie (大界, in modern Xianyang, Shaanxi), where Empress Mao had remained, and she, after making a desperate attempt to fight Yao Chang's forces off with her guards, was captured after killing 700 Later Qin soldiers. Yao Chang wanted to make her his concubine, but she, in anger, cried out:

"Yao Chang, you murdered the Son of Heaven (referring to Yao Chang's killing of Fu Jiān in 385), and now you want to humiliate the empress. How can heaven and earth still tolerate you?"

Yao Chang therefore executed her, along with Fu Deng's sons Fu Bian (苻弁) the Prince of Nan'an and Fu Shang (苻尚) the Prince of Beihai. (Note: It is unclear whether they were her sons.)

== Notes ==
Chinese royalty
Preceded by Empress Yang	Empress of Former Qin; 387–389	Succeeded by Empress Li
