= Empress Mao =

Empress Mao may refer to:

- Empress Mingdao (died 237), Chinese empress of Cao Wei
- Empress Mao (Former Qin) (died 389), Chinese empress of Former Qin
