= Prince of Chin =

Prince of Chin may refer to:

- Prince of Qin (disambiguation) (Prince of Ch'in in Wade–Giles)
- Prince of Jin (disambiguation) (Prince of Chin in Wade–Giles)
