= 389th =

389th may refer to:

- 389th Bombardment Squadron, inactive United States Air Force unit
- 389th Fighter Squadron (389 FS) is part of the 366th Fighter Wing at Mountain Home Air Force Base, Idaho
- 389th Infantry Division (Wehrmacht), German division of the Wehrmacht in the Second World War; fought in the Battle of Stalingrad
- 389th Strategic Missile Wing, inactive unit of the United States Air Force

== See also ==
- 389 (number)
- 389, the year 389 (CCCLXXXIX) of the Julian calendar
- 389 BC
