= Fu Pi =

Emperor Aiping of Former Qin 前秦哀平帝
- Emperor of Former Qin

Emperor of Former Qin
- Reign: 385–386
- Predecessor: Fú Jiān
- Successor: Fu Deng
- Born: unknown
- Died: 386
Names
- Fu Pi (苻丕)
Era name and dates
- Tài'ān (太安): 385–386
Posthumous name
- Emperor Aiping (哀平皇帝, lit. "lamentable and peaceful")
- House: Fu
- Dynasty: Former Qin
- Father: Fú Jiān

Fu Pi (Chinese: 苻丕; fl. 357 - c.November 386), courtesy name Yongshu (永叔), also known by his posthumous name as the Emperor Aiping of Former Qin (前秦哀平帝), was an emperor of the Di-led Former Qin dynasty of China. He was Fu Jiān (Emperor Xuanzhao)'s oldest son, although not his crown prince. After Fu Jiān's death at the hands of Yao Chang, the founder of the Later Qin dynasty, Fu Pi and his brother Crown Prince Fu Hong (苻宏) was forced to flee to the Eastern Jin dynasty. He then claimed the imperial title in 385, but was defeated by the Western Yan prince Murong Yong in 386, and killed by the Eastern Jin general Feng Gai (馮該).

== Early career ==
It is not known when Fu Pi was born. Fu Pi was first mentioned in historical records in 357, when his father Fu Jiān overthrew the violent and whimsical emperor Fu Sheng and took the throne with the title "Heavenly King" (Tian Wang). Fu Jiān created Fu Pi, his oldest son, the Duke of Changle. At that time, Fu Pi was described to have talent in both governance and military matters, whose talents were only lesser to his uncle Fu Rong, whose abilities were much praised by historians. He was appointed governor of Yongzhou (雍州, in modern southeastern Zhenyuan County, Gansu) in 368.

In 378, Fu Jiān commissioned Fu Pi to command a large army against the Jin city Xiangyang (襄陽, in modern Xiangfan, Hubei). At the advice of the general Gou Chang (苟萇), Fu Pi chose to surround the city and cut off its supply route to strangle it into submission, rather than making direct assaults on the city. However, around the new year 379, Fu Jiān, anxious to capture the city, sent him a sword, stating that if by the spring he had not captured the city, he should kill himself with the sword. After receiving the sword, Fu Pi, in fear, made a fierce attack on the city and captured it.

== As viceroy over eastern provinces ==
In 380, Fu Jiān recalled Fu Rong, who had served as the viceroy over the eastern provinces (the former territory of Former Yan, which Former Qin destroyed in 370), back to the capital Chang'an to serve as prime minister in place of the capable Wang Meng, who died in 375. Fu Pi was made the viceroy of the eastern provinces to replace Fu Rong. As Fu Jiān, that year, also implemented a plan to distribute his Di people to various regions of the empire, a substantial number of Di soldiers and their families accompanied Fu Pi to his command post at Yecheng.

Fu Pi was not involved in the crushing defeat that Former Qin forces suffered at the Battle of Fei River, as he remained at Yecheng. In the aftermaths of the battle, however, the Xianbei general Murong Chui, a Former Yan prince, plotted a rebellion to reestablish Yan. In late 383, after persuading Fu Jiān to allow him to visit the eastern provinces to try to calm the people in light of the defeat at Fei River, Murong Chui arrived at Yecheng, where Murong Chui continued plotting, and where Murong Chui and Fu Pi considered ambushing each other but each decided not to do so. When, subsequently, the Dingling chieftain Zhai Bin (翟斌) rebelled and attacked Luoyang, defended by Fu Pi's brother Fu Hui (苻暉) the Duke of Pingyuan, Fu Jiān ordered Murong Chui to put down Zhai's rebellion, and Fu Pi sent his assistant Fu Feilong (苻飛龍) to serve as Murong Chui's assistant. On the way to Luoyang, however, Murong Chui killed Fu Feilong and his Di soldiers and prepared to openly rebel. Meanwhile, despite his suspicions of Murong Chui, Fu Pi did not put Murong Chui's son Murong Nong and nephews Murong Kai (慕容楷) and Murong Shao (慕容紹) under surveillance, and the three fled out of Yecheng and started a rebellion of their own.

In spring 384, Murong Chui openly declared the establishment of Later Yan, claiming the title of Prince of Yan. Fu Pi tried to persuade Murong Chui to end his rebellion, but Murong Chui refused and attacked Yecheng but was unable to capture it quickly. However, most cities north of the Yellow River and east of Taihang Mountains switched allegiance or were captured by Later Yan forces, leaving Yecheng isolated. (The Former Qin cities south of the Yellow River were largely captured by Jin.) With the heart of the empire itself under attacks by rebel regimes Later Qin and Western Yan, Fu Pi could have no expectation of receiving aid, and the situation soon grew desperate for him and his troops. In late 384, Murong Chui briefly lifted the siege of Yecheng to try to regroup, but at the same time, Jin forces attacked. Fu Pi sued for peace, but without his knowledge his assistant Yang Ying (楊膺) also promised on his behalf that he would surrender to Jin. With that promise, the Jin general Xie Xuan aided him with troops and food supplies, but eventually the temporary alliance broke up again. Meanwhile, Murong Chui returned and again put the city under siege after defeating Jin troops under Liu Laozhi (劉牢之). In 385, Fu Pi abandoned Yecheng and headed northwest to Jinyang (晉陽, in modern Taiyuan, Shanxi), where he received news that his father Fu Jiān had been killed by the Later Qin ruler Yao Chang. He then declared himself emperor.

== Reign ==
Fu Pi took measures to try to consolidate his current position—now largely only over modern Shanxi, although there were still many pockets of territory loyal to Former Qin in modern Shaanxi and Gansu, and there were also still pockets of resistance even in the middle of Later Yan territory. His prime minister Wang Yong (王永) (Wang Meng's son) issued a declaration inviting all those who were still loyal to be prepared to rendezvous at Linjin (臨晉, in modern Weinan, Shaanxi) in winter 386. Many local generals answered the call, although the rendezvous would never actually happen.

In fall 386, the Western Yan ruler Murong Yong, whose people had abandoned the Guanzhong region to head east, trying to return to their home land, requested Fu Pi to grant permission to let them through. Fu Pi refused and tried to intercept them, but suffered a major defeat, in which Wang Yong and the major general Juqu Jushizi (沮渠俱石子) were killed, and most of Fu Pi's officials and his wife Empress Yang were captured. The only general under Fu Pi who still had a strong army remaining was his cousin Fu Zuan (苻纂) the Prince of Donghai, who remained at Jinyang, but Fu Pi was suspicious of Fu Zuan's intentions and therefore did not dare to return to Jinyang, but instead headed south, wanting to make a surprise attack on Luoyang, then held by Jin. The Jin general Feng Gai (馮該) intercepted him and killed him in battle. His sons Fu Ning (苻寧) the crown prince and Fu Shou (苻壽) the Prince of Changle were captured by Jin forces but pardoned and given to their uncle Fu Hong (苻宏) -- Fu Jiān's crown prince, who had surrendered to Jin earlier. His sons Fu Yi (苻懿) the Prince of Bohai and Fu Chang (苻昶) the Prince of Jibei were escorted by an official to his distant nephew Fu Deng the Prince of Nan'an, who initially proposed making Fu Yi the emperor, but after his subordinates recommended that he take the throne himself, did so.

== Personal information ==
- Father
  - Fu Jiān (Emperor Xuanzhao)
- Wife
  - Empress Yang (created 385, killed by Murong Yong of Western Yan 386)
- Children
  - Fu Ning (苻寧), the Crown Prince (created 385)
  - Fu Shou (苻壽), the Prince of Changle (created 385)
  - Fu Qiang (苻鏘), the Prince of Pingyuan (created 385)
  - Fu Yi (苻懿), initially the Prince of Bohai (created 385), later Crown Prince Xian'ai under Fu Deng (created 387, d. 388)
  - Fu Chang (苻昶), the Prince of Jibei (created 385)

Emperor Aiping of (Former) Qin House of Fu Died: 386
Regnal titles
Preceded by Fu Jiān	Emperor of Former Qin; 385–386	Succeeded by Fu Deng
Titles in pretence
Preceded by Fu Jiān	— TITULAR — Emperor of China; 385–386; Reason for succession failure: Sixteen Kingdoms	Succeeded by Fu Deng
Preceded by Fu Jiān	— TITULAR — Emperor of China; 385–386; Reason for succession failure: Sixteen Kingdoms	Succeeded by Murong Yong
Preceded by Fu Jiān	— TITULAR — Emperor of China; 385–386; Reason for succession failure: Sixteen Kingdoms	Succeeded by Emperor Daowu of Northern Wei
Preceded by Fu Jiān	— TITULAR — Emperor of China; 385–386; Reason for succession failure: Sixteen Kingdoms	Succeeded by Lü Guang
Preceded by Fu Jiān	— TITULAR — Emperor of China; 385–386; Reason for succession failure: Sixteen Kingdoms	Succeeded by Qifu Guoren
