= Fu Deng =

Emperor Gao of Former Qin 前秦高帝
- Emperor of Former Qin

Emperor of Former Qin
- Reign: 386–394
- Predecessor: Fu Pi
- Successor: Fu Chong
- Born: 343
- Died: 394
Names
- Fu Deng (苻登)
Era name and dates
- Tàichū (太初): 386–394
Posthumous name
- Emperor Gao (高皇帝)
Temple name
- Tàizōng (太宗)
- House: Fu (Pu)
- Dynasty: Former Qin

Fu Deng (Chinese: 苻登; 343–394), courtesy name Wengao (文高), also known by his posthumous name as the Emperor Gao of Former Qin (前秦高帝), was an emperor of the Di-led Chinese Former Qin dynasty. He assumed the throne in 386 after the deaths of Fu Jiān (Emperor Xuanzhao) and Fu Jiān's son Fu Pi (Emperor Aiping), even though he was only a distant relative of theirs, as by that time the Former Qin's territory had largely been reduced to the territory under his control. He battled the Later Qin emperor Yao Chang for years in a stalemate that neither could conclusively prevail, but in 394, he made a major attack on Later Qin after Yao Chang's death, seriously underestimating Yao Chang's son and successor Yao Xing, who captured and executed him. Later that year, his son Fu Chong, who succeeded him, would die in battle, ending the Former Qin dynasty.

== Early career ==
Fu Deng was born in 343, to Fu Chang (苻敞), a distant grandnephew of Former Qin's founder Fu Jiàn, while still under Later Zhao rule. After Fu Jiàn founded Former Qin in 351, Fu Chang served as a general and a commandery governor. During the reign of Fu Jiàn's cruel and whimsical son Fu Sheng (r. 355–357), Fu Chang was executed, but he was posthumously honored after Fu Sheng was overthrown by his cousin Fu Jiān. Fu Jiān was impressed by Fu Deng's abilities, and when he grew older, Fu Deng was made the county magistrate of the capital Chang'an. Later, however, for unspecified faults, he was demoted to be the county magistrate for Didao (狄道, in modern Dingxi, Gansu).

After Former Qin began to collapse in 384 and Fu Jiān was killed by the Later Qin general Yao Chang in 385, Fu Deng became a subordinate of the general Mao Xing (毛興), who sought to control all of the provinces in the west still nominally under Former Qin rule, but his soldiers became weary from all of the battles and assassinated him in 386, replacing him with Wei Ping (衛平), a very old general who was the head of the clan. However, these soldiers soon became convinced that Wei was too old to accomplish much, and they deposed Wei and replaced him with Fu Deng. Fu Deng submitted a report of these events to Fu Jiān's son Fu Pi, the new emperor, and Fu Pi commissioned him as a provincial governor and created him the Prince of Nan'an.

The battles between Fu Deng and Yao Chang after the former replaced Wei Ping coincided with a time of droughts and famines. Fu Deng called the killed enemies shóushí (熟食, "cooked food" or "readied food") and told his soldiers, "Fight in the morning and you will have meat to eat in the evening. Why worry about hunger?" The soldiers followed his order, ate the corpses, and had the force for battles. Hearing this, Yao Chang hurried to call his brother Yao Shuode (姚碩德) for help, saying, "If you do not come, we are going to be eaten off by Fu Deng."

Later in 386, Fu Pi died in battle against Jin, and the territory under his direct control (modern Shanxi), as well as his officials, fell into the hands of the Western Yan emperor Murong Yong. His official Kou Qian (寇遣) escorted his sons Fu Yi (苻懿) the Prince of Bohai and Fu Chang (苻昶, note different character than Fu Deng's father) the Prince of Jibei to Fu Deng's domain. Fu Deng, after mourning for Fu Pi, proposed to have Fu Yi declared emperor, but his subordinates all opined that given the state Former Qin was in (down to holding not much more than the territory under Fu Deng's control), the state needed an older emperor; at their suggestion, Fu Deng himself took the throne. He made Fu Yi his crown prince.

== Reign ==
=== Before the Battle of Dajie ===
Even before he took imperial title, Fu Deng battled Yao Chang continuously, and the wars between Fu Deng and Yao Chang's Later Qin intensified after Fu Deng became Former Qin's emperor. Fu Deng set up a shrine to Fu Jiān in his army, and whenever he made a key decision he would report it to Fu Jiān. He was also described as a master of square and circular formations (although the exact mechanism is not understood well), and initially won a number of battles over Later Qin—so much so that Yao Chang, in fear, also set up a shrine dedicated to Fu Jiān in his army, apologizing for his killing of Fu Jiān and requesting forgiveness. However, after that failed to yield victories, Yao Chang cut off the head of the effigy he had made of Fu Jiān and delivered to Fu Deng. But Fu Deng's victories over Yao Chang did not appear to have lasting impact, and the wars between Former Qin and Later Qin became stalemated. Meanwhile, Fu Deng's shortcomings became exposed—an inability to take decisive action to deal heavy damage to Later Qin, and Yao Chang took advantage of his indecisive tendencies to gradually destroy other semi-independent generals in the Guanzhong region and consolidate his power base.

In 387, Fu Deng created the ruler of Western Qin, Qifu Guoren, the Prince of Wanchuan, and Qifu Guoren accepted, signifying at least nominal submission to Fu Deng. After Qifu Guoren died in 388 and was succeeded by his brother Qifu Gangui, the relationship continued.

In summer 388, Fu Yi the Crown Prince died, and Fu Deng created his own son Fu Chong to be the crown prince.

In summer 389, a battle would greatly damage Fu Deng. He had set up a base of operations at Dajie (大界, in modern Xianyang, Shaanxi), guarded by his wife Empress Mao, while attacking Later Qin's city of Pingliang and capturing it. Meanwhile, however, Yao Chang made a surprise attack on Dajie, capturing and killing Empress Mao and Fu Deng's sons Fu Bian the Prince of Nan'an and Fu Shang the Prince of Beihai. Some 50,000 of Fu Deng's people were captured.

=== After the Battle of Dajie ===
Then, Fu Deng gathered his remaining army and went back to Hu Kong Castle (胡空堡, in modern Xianyang, Shaanxi). He promoted generals such as Dou Chong, Yang Ding, and Yang Bi (楊璧). Fu Deng attacked Zhang Longshi (張龍世) in Yangquanbao (鴦泉堡). Yao Chang sent his generals to help Zhang and set up a trap. They pretended to surrender in order to catch Fu Deng. Fu Deng, initially believing in the false surrender, avoided to be fooled with the reminding of Lei Edi (雷惡地).

After the Battle of Dajie, Fu Deng appeared to be no longer able to again make major attacks against Later Qin, although the two states continued to battle continuously, and Yao Chang appeared to be equally unable to destroy Fu Deng. However, Yao Chang continued the consolidation process by destroying other semi-independent generals, and Later Qin grew stronger and stronger.

In 392, Fu Deng created one of his concubines, Consort Li, empress.

Later in 392, Yao Chang grew ill, and Fu Deng, hearing this, made a major attack on the important Later Qin city Anding (安定, in modern Pingliang, Gansu), but Yao Chang, in his illness, nevertheless faced him in battle, forcing Fu Deng to withdraw—and then, in the engagement, made a clean evasive maneuver with his troops and disengaged, to Fu Deng's surprise, and Fu Deng commented:

What kind of a man is Yao Chang? I could not tell when he would go and when he would come. Everyone thought that he is near death, but he lives to fight. It is unfortunate that I live at the same time as this old Qiang.

=== Death ===
Yao Chang died around the new year 394 and was succeeded by his son Yao Xing. While Yao Xing tried to keep news of Yao Chang's death a secret, the news still got to Fu Deng. Fu Deng, extremely glad to hear about Yao Chang's death, prepared to launch a major assault against Later Qin—he had his brother Fu Guang (苻廣) defend the base of Yongcheng (雍城, in modern Baoji, Shaanxi) and Fu Chong defend the base of Hu Kong Castle, and, in his anxiety, did not make sure that his army had sufficient water supply. Yao Xing set up his army at Mawei (馬嵬, in modern Xianyang, Shaanxi) to prevent Former Qin forces from reaching the river near Mawei, and Former Qin forces collapsed in thirst. Upon hearing the defeat, Fu Guang and Fu Chong abandoned the two bases that they were holding, and Fu Deng was unable to recapture them. He instead fled to Pingliang and then into the mountains. He sent his son Fu Zong the Prince of Ruyin to Qifu Gangui and married his sister the Princess Dongping to Qifu Gangui as his princess, seeking aid from Qifu Gangui. Qifu Gangui sent his general Qifu Yizhou (乞伏益州) to aid Fu Deng, but as Fu Deng came out of the mountains to join Qifu Yizhou's forces, Yao Xing ambushed and captured him, and then executed him. He disbanded Fu Deng's troops and gave Fu Deng's Empress Li to his general Yao Huang (姚晃).

== Personal information ==
- Father
  - Fu Chang (苻敞), killed by Fu Sheng
- Wives
  - Empress Mao (created 387, killed by Yao Chang 389), daughter of Mao Xing (毛興)
  - Empress Li (created 392, captured by Yao Xing 394 and awarded to Yao Huang (姚晃))
- Children
  - Fu Chong (苻崇), initially the Prince of Dongping (created 387), later the Crown Prince (created 388), later emperor
  - Fu Bian (苻弁), the Prince of Nan'an (created 388, killed by Yao Chang 389)
  - Fu Shang (苻尚), the Prince of Beihai (created 388, killed by Yao Chang 389)
  - Fu Zong (苻宗), the Prince of Ruyin

Emperor Gao of (Former) Qin House of Fu Born: 343 Died: 394
Regnal titles
Preceded by Fu Pi	Emperor of Former Qin; 386–394	Succeeded by Fu Chong
Titles in pretence
Preceded by Fu Pi	— TITULAR — Emperor of China; 386–394; Reason for succession failure: Sixteen Kingdoms	Succeeded by Fu Chong
Preceded by Fu Pi	— TITULAR — Emperor of China; 386–394; Reason for succession failure: Sixteen Kingdoms	Succeeded by Yao Xing
