= Yao Chang =

Emperor Wuzhao of Later Qin 後秦武昭帝
- Emperor of Later Qin
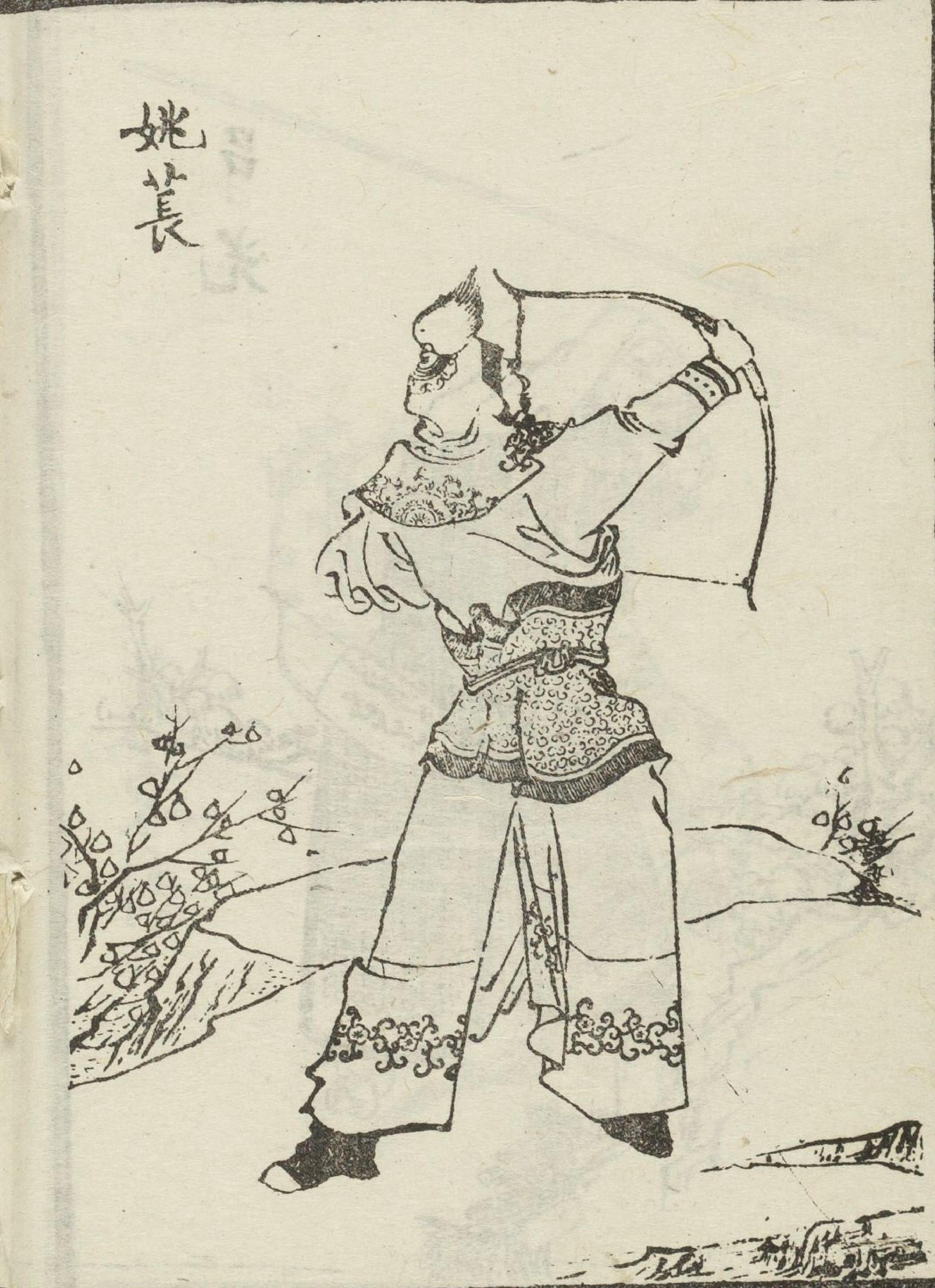

Emperor of Later Qin
- Reign: 384–394
- Successor: Yao Xing
- Born: 331
- Died: 394 (aged 62–63)
- Burial: Yuan Mausoleum (原陵)
- Spouse: Empress She; Empress Dowager Suen
- Issue: Yao Xing
Names
- Yao Chang (姚萇)
Era dates
- Bái què (白雀): 384–386; Jiàn chū (建初): 386–393
Regnal name
- Grand General, Grand Chanyu, King of Qin of Ten Thousand Years (大將軍 大單于 萬年秦王, 384–386); Emperor (since 386)
Posthumous name
- Emperor Wuzhao (武昭皇帝, lit. "martial and accomplished")
Temple name
- Taizu (太祖)
- House: Yao
- Dynasty: Later Qin
- Father: Yao Yizhong

Yao Chang (Chinese: 姚萇; 331–394), courtesy name Jingmao (景茂), also known by his posthumous name as the Emperor Wuzhao of Later Qin (後秦武昭帝), was the founding emperor of the Qiang-led Chinese Later Qin dynasty. His father Yao Yizhong had been a powerful general and Qiang chieftain under the Later Zhao emperor Shi Hu, but after Later Zhao's collapse after Shi Hu's death, Yao Chang's older brother Yao Xiang tried to start an independent state but was defeated and killed by Former Qin forces. Yao Chang became a Former Qin general, but after an incident in 384 after the Former Qin emperor Fu Jiān's defeat at the Battle of Fei River, Yao Chang feared that Fu Jiān would kill him and therefore rebelled. He subsequently captured and killed Fu Jiān, who had saved his life when Yao Xiang was defeated, causing many historians to view him as a traitor and murderer.

== Early life ==
Yao Chang was born in 331, while his father Yao Yizhong (姚弋仲), a major Qiang chief, was a general under the Later Zhao emperor Shi Le. He was the 24th of Yao Yizhong's 42 sons. He was described as intelligent and deliberate, but uninterested in detail matters. After Later Zhao's collapse, Yao Yizhong submitted to Jin Dynasty (266–420) as a vassal, and, after he died in 351, his son Yao Xiang took over his troops and headed south to submit to Jin command. After realizing that the Jin general Yin Hao was greatly suspicious of him, however, Yao Xiang rebelled in 352 and ambushed Yin, and then occupied the cities in the Luoyang region (although not Luoyang itself), intending on establishing himself as the ruler of the region. During this time, Yao Chang served as one of his strategists. In a battle in 352, Yao Xiang's horse was killed, and Yao Chang yielded his horse to Yao Xiang—telling Yao Xiang that as long as he was still alive, the enemy would not dare to touch Yao Chang. However, as they were still discussing, they were rescued by their troops.

However, before Yao Xiang could strengthen his rule over the region, the Jin general Huan Wen attacked him in 356 and defeated him, capturing cities that he held and forcing him to abandon the plans to establish himself in the region. Instead, He was forced to advance northwest and then west to face Former Qin, ruled by the ethnically-Di emperor Fu Sheng. In 357, Yao Xiang advanced into Former Qin territory, and a number of Qiang, Xiongnu, and Han submitted themselves to him. Fu Sheng sent a force commanded by Fu Huangmei (苻黃眉), Fu Dao (苻道), Fu Jiān, and Deng Qiang to resist him. Initially, Yao Xiang refused to engage them, but after Deng openly insulted him, Yao attacked and fell into a trap and was captured and killed. Yao Chang took over his troops but knew he could not resist, and so surrendered. Initially, Fu Huangmei wanted to execute Yao Chang, but at Fu Jiān's intercession, Yao Chang was spared.

== In service of Fu Jiān ==
In 357, Fu Jiān overthrew the cruel and whimsical Fu Sheng (who had, in addition to many others, put Fu Huangmei to death even after his great victory) and took the throne himself. Sometime early in his reign, Fu Jiān made Yao Chang a general. The first campaign in which he was mentioned by name was in 366, when he assisted Wang Meng in an attack on Jin's Jing Province (荊州, modern Hunan and central and southern Hubei). In 367, he again assisted Wang Meng in attacking the rebels in modern eastern Gansu, who were led by the Qiang general Lian Qi (斂岐), whose subordinates were originally all Yao Yizhong's subordinates and therefore surrendered to him readily. Fu Jiān made him the governor of Longdong Commandery (隴東, roughly modern Baoji, Shaanxi). In 371, he was part of the campaign against Chouchi's ruler Yang Cuan (楊篡), and in 373, after Former Qin seized the modern Sichuan, Chongqing, and southern Shaanxi from Jin, Yao Chang was made the governor of Ning Province (寧州, modern southern Sichuan). In 376, Yao Chang also assisted Gou Chang (苟萇) in Former Qin's conquest of Former Liang, and in 378 involved in the siege against the Jin city Xiangyang (襄陽, in modern Xiangfan, Hubei). Sometime during Fu Jiān's reign, he created Yao Chang the Marquess of Yidu.

In 383, Fu Jiān prepared a major attack on Jin, intending to destroy it and unite China. Yao Chang was one of the few generals who was in favor of the plan, as the vast majority of Fu Jiān's subordinates opposed, including his brother and prime minister Fu Rong—who specifically was suspicious of Yao Chang and Murong Chui (a general with Former Yan imperial ancestry), neither of whom was of Di ancestry and both of whom favored the attack on Jin. Fu Jiān proceeded with the plan despite Fu Rong's opposition, making Fu Rong the commander of the main invasion force. Yao Chang was put in charge of the armies of the southwest (on a separate front away from the main front), and as Fu Jiān was handing out the command assignments, he gave Yao Chang the title General Longxiang (龍驤將軍), a title that he himself carried previously when he overthrew Fu Sheng, and he commented, apparently in a jocular tone:

Before, I established my rule as the General Longxiang. I do not easily confer this title on others. You should take good care of the title.

Another general, Dou Chong, immediately objected, stating that it is a bad omen for the emperor to joke, and Fu Jiān grew briefly silent.

Later that year, against the much weaker Jin troops, Fu Rong's forces were nevertheless defeated at the Battle of Fei River, a battle that Yao Chang was not involved in, and Fu Rong was killed. In early 384, Murong Chui rebelled in the eastern empire, hoping to reestablish Yan, and upon hearing Murong Chui's rebellion, Murong Chui's nephew Murong Hong rebelled as well, near the Former Qin capital Chang'an. Fu Jiān sent his brother Fu Rui (苻叡) against Murong Hong, assisted by Yao Chang. Yao Chang advocated letting Murong Hong, who was intent on leaving the Guanzhong region to return to his homeland, leave, but the brash Fu Rui insisted on intercepting Murong Hong, and was defeated and killed by Murong Hong. Yao Chang sent messengers Zhao Du (趙都) and Jiang Xie (姜協) to report the bad news to Fu Jiān and Fu Jiān, inexplicably, executed Zhao and Jiang in anger. Yao Chang became fearful and abandoned his troops, gathered the Qiang of the region, and rebelled himself, claiming the title of "King of Qin of 10,000 Years" (萬年秦王), thus establishing Later Qin.

== As king ==
Yao Chang initially opted to keep his troops mobile, as he anticipated Murong Hong's Western Yan forces to siege Chang'an and destroy Former Qin and then depart for their homeland, so that he could take Chang'an without major engagements. In doing this, he hoped to conserve and increase his strength while his rivals battled. He therefore temporarily placed his capital at Beidi (北地, in modern Tongchuan, Shaanxi), seizing the cities of the modern northern Shaanxi. Despite this, he had periodic battles with Former Qin and Western Yan forces, as Former Qin and Western Yan also battled each other.

In 385, an incident involving the city of Xinping (新平, in modern Xianyang, Shaanxi) helped to further establish Yao Chang's reputation as wily and treacherous. The people of Xinping had fought extremely hard to preserve their city for Former Qin when Yao Chang first started sieging the city in late 384. Eventually, when Xinping ran out of food supplies and military equipment, Yao Chang assured the governor of Xinping commandery, Gou Fu (苟輔), that if he yielded the city, he would be allowed to safely lead the people of Xinping to Chang'an. Gou believed him, but as soon as he exited the city with the 5,000 remaining people, Yao Chang surrounded them with his troops and slaughtered them all, with only a single person who escaped.

In fall 385, Fu Jiān abandoned Chang'an, long under siege by Western Yan, and he sought to try to find food supplies. When he arrived at Wujiang Mountain (五將山, in modern Baoji, Shaanxi), Yao Chang sent his general Wu Zhong (吳忠) to surround Fu Jiān, eventually capturing him and delivering him to Xinping to be imprisoned there. Yao Chang tried to persuade him to ceremonially pass the throne to him, but Fu Jiān, angry at Yao's betrayal, refused. Later in 385, Yao sent his soldiers to strangle Fu Jiān. Even Later Qin soldiers mourned Fu Jiān, however, and Yao, in order to pretend as if he did not put Fu Jiān to death, posthumously honored him as Heavenly King Zhuanglie (壯烈天王).

Western Yan forces, under its now-emperor Murong Chong, occupied Chang'an, and Western Yan and Later Qin battled on-and-off. However, the Western Yan people were unhappy that Murong Chong was not leading them back to their homeland in the east, and, in 386, Murong Chong was assassinated in a coup and replaced with Duan Sui, who was then assassinated and replaced with Murong Yi, under whom the Western Yan people abandoned Chang'an and headed east. Briefly, Chang'an was held by the Lushuihu chief Hao Nu (郝奴), but Yao Chang then advanced on Chang'an, and Hao surrendered. Yao Chang made Chang'an his capital and claimed the title of emperor. He created his wife Lady She as empress and his son Yao Xing as crown prince.

== As emperor ==
For the next few years, Yao Chang would not have complete control over the region, as many Di, Qiang, Xiongnu, and Han generals were still remaining semi-independent throughout the region. Further, in 386, a distant member of Former Qin's imperial Fu clan, Fu Deng, rose in modern eastern Gansu to oppose him, and after the death of Fu Jiān's son Fu Pi that year, claimed imperial title and became the main adversary for Yao Chang. Fu Deng used Yao Chang's killing of Fu Jiān to good propaganda effect, and for several years was quite successful in battles against Yao Chang, although the battles were generally inconclusive in their impact, with neither Fu Deng nor Yao Chang being able to decisively defeat the other. However, Yao Chang was able to gradually subdue the other Former Qin generals of the region, taking advantage of Fu Deng's cautiousness. In 387, for example, after the Former Qin general Fu Zuan (苻纂) was killed by his brother Fu Shinu (苻師奴), Yao Chang took the opportunity to quickly advance against Fu Shinu and defeat him, seizing his troops. He also, at the same time, seized the remaining cities held by Western Yan west of the Yellow River.

In 389, after losing several battles to Former Qin, Yao Chang desecrated Fu Jiān's tomb and whipped his body before reburying it. However, soon he became apprehensive and thought that Fu Jiān's spirit was aiding Former Qin, so he, following Fu Deng's lead, made an image of Fu Jiān and worshipped it, claiming to it that he had killed Fu Jiān only to avenge Yao Xiang and asking for forgiveness. The image did not help Yao Chang, and he eventually cut off its head and sent it to Fu Deng. Later that year, as Fu Deng was pressuring Yao Chang, however, Yao Chang made a surprise attack at night, around Fu Deng's army, against Fu Deng logistics base Dajie (大界, in modern Xianyang, Shaanxi), capturing it and Fu Deng's wife Empress Mao and killing his sons Fu Bian (苻弁) and Fu Shang (苻尚). He initially wanted to make Empress Mao his concubine, but after she cursed him, he executed her. While Former Qin and Later Qin would continue to stalemate for the next few years, Fu Deng was unable to again threaten Later Qin's existence from this point on.

In 392, Yao Chang grew ill, and Fu Deng, hearing this, made a major attack on the important Later Qin city Anding (安定, in modern Pingliang, Gansu), but Yao Chang, in his illness, nevertheless faced him in battle, forcing Fu Deng to withdraw—and then, in the engagement, made a clean evasive maneuver with his troops and disengaged, to Fu Deng's surprise, and Fu Deng commented:

What kind of a man is Yao Chang? I could not tell when he would go and when he would come. Everyone thought that he is near death, but he lives to fight. It is unfortunate that I live at the same time as this old Qiang.

Around the new year 394, Yao Chang died. It is recorded in the Book of Jin that he was haunted by Fu Jiān's spirit in his dreams and became insane. A guard attempted to help him but accidentally injured him in the groin, causing him to die from blood loss. He continued to beg Fu Jiān for forgiveness before he died. Yao Xing succeeded him.

== Personal information ==
- Father
  - Yao Yizhong (d. 351), posthumously honored as Emperor Jingyuan
- Wife
  - Empress She (created 386, d. 397)
- Major Concubines
  - Consort Sun, posthumously honored as empress dowager, might be Crown Prince Xing's birth mother
- Children
  - Yao Xing (姚興), the Crown Prince (created 386), later emperor
  - Yao Song (姚嵩), the Marquess of Ancheng and Sikong (killed in battle 416)
  - Yao Ping (姚平), the Duke of Yiyang (killed in battle 402)
  - Yao Chóng (姚崇) (note tone difference), the Duke of Qi (created 395)
  - Yao Xian (姚顯), the Duke of Changshan (created 395)
  - Yao Yong (姚邕), the Duke of Jinan
  - Yao Chōng (姚沖) (note tone difference) (forced to commit suicide 409)
  - Princess Nan'an

Emperor Wuzhao of (Later) Qin House of Yao Born: 331 Died: 394
Regnal titles
Preceded by Himself as King of Qin	Emperor of Later Qin; 386–394	Succeeded by Yao Xing
Chinese royalty
Recreated Title last held by Fú Jiàn	King of Qin; 384–386	Succeeded by Himself as Emperor of Later Qin
Titles in pretence
Preceded by Fu Jiān	— TITULAR — Emperor of China; 386–394; Reason for succession failure: Sixteen Kingdoms	Succeeded by Yao Xing
Preceded by Duan Sui	— TITULAR — Emperor of China; 386–394; Reason for succession failure: Sixteen Kingdoms	Succeeded by Yao Xing
