= Later Qin =

Qiang state (384–417) during the Sixteen Kingdoms period

Qin 秦
- 384–417 AD
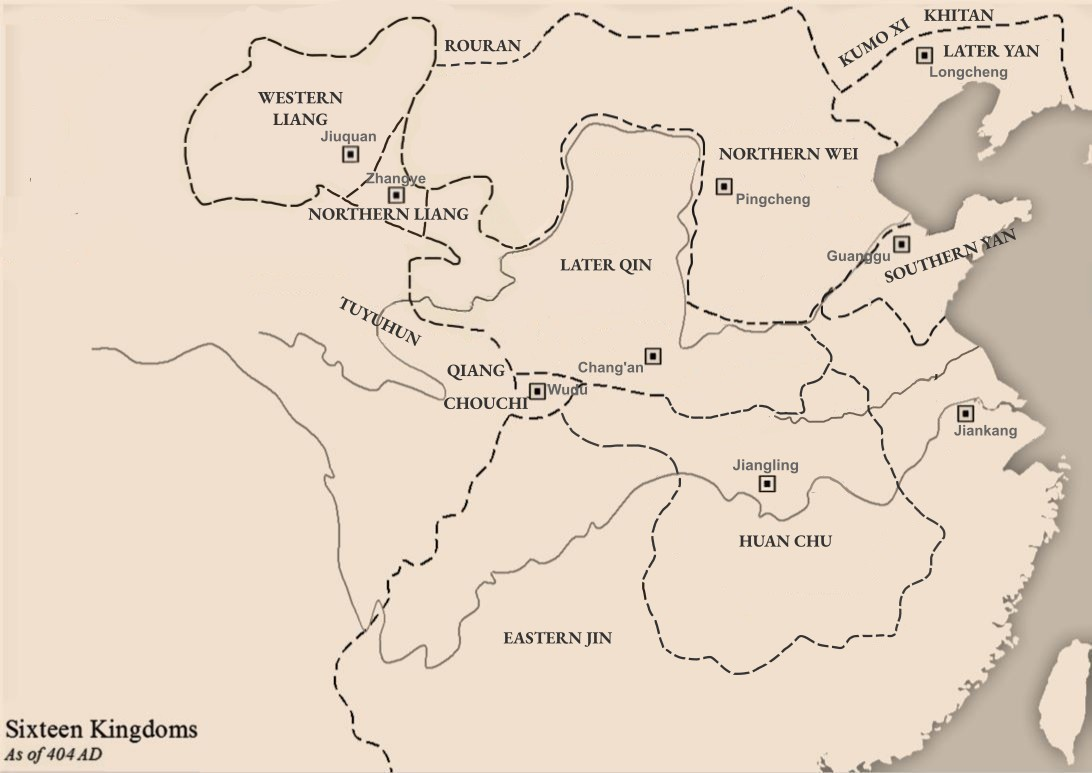
- Later Qin in 404 AD
- Capital: Chang'an
- Government: Monarchy
- Emperor
  - 384–393: Yao Chang
  - 394–416: Yao Xing
  - 416–417: Yao Hong
- History
  - Established: 384
  - Yao Chang's claim of imperial title: 386
  - Liu Bobo's rebellion: 407
  - Disestablished: 20 September 417 AD
Preceded by
Former Qin
Western Yan
Later Liang (Sixteen Kingdoms)
Succeeded by
Xia (Sixteen Kingdoms)
Jin Dynasty (266–420)
- Today part of: China

Qin, known in historiography as the Later Qin (simplified Chinese: 后秦; traditional Chinese: 後秦; pinyin: Hòuqín; 384–417 AD) or Yao Qin (姚秦), was a dynastic state of China ruled by the Yao clan of Qiang ethnicity during the Sixteen Kingdoms period in northern China. As the only Qiang-led state among the Sixteen Kingdoms, it was most known for its propagation of Buddhism under its second ruler, Yao Xing, who sponsored the Madhyamakin monk, Kumārajīva to translate Sanskrit Buddhist text into Chinese.

All rulers of the Later Qin declared themselves emperors, but for a substantial part of Yao Xing's reign, he used the title Heavenly King. Historiographers gave the state the prefix of "Later" to distinguish it with the Former Qin and Western Qin as it was founded during the Former Qin's collapse after the Battle of Fei River and went on to conquer the Former Qin's power base in the Guanzhong. With Chang'an as its capital, the Later Qin also controlled Henan and vassalised the Western Qin, the four Liangs (Later, Southern, Northern and Western), Southern Yan, Qiao Shu, Chouchi and various tribes of the Hetao region.

== History ==
=== Background ===
The Yao clan of Chiting County (赤亭), Nan'an Commandery (南安郡; southeast of present-day Longxi County, Gansu) were descendants of a powerful Qiang tribe called the Shaodang, who once terrorized the Han dynasty's western borders for centuries. By the 3rd century CE, however, the family had long settled down within the Chinese interior and underwent some degree of sinicization, as evident by their Chinese surname. Their chieftain, Yao Kehui, rendered military service to the Cao Wei dynasty, and was rewarded with official titles for his merits. When the Disaster of Yongjia befell the Western Jin dynasty in 311, his son, Yao Yizhong asserted autonomy over Yumei (榆眉; east of present-day Qianyang County, Shaanxi) and gathered a large group of refugees under his command. Yao Yizhong later submitted to the Xiongnu Han-Zhao dynasty, and afterwards to the Jie-led Later Zhao.

Under the Later Zhao, Yizhong became a close associate of the influential general, Shi Hu. When Shi Hu seized power of the Zhao government in 333, he had Yizhong and his followers relocated east near the capital region, where Yizhong was appointed as Grand Commander of the Western Qiang (西羌大都督) with his headquarters at Shetou (灄頭; northeast of present-day Zaoqiang County, Hebei). After Shi Hu's death in 349, Yizhong became deeply involved in the Zhao princes' fratricidal struggle for the throne. His attempt to return west was thwarted by the Di general, Fu Hong, whose family soon founded the Former Qin dynasty in the Guanzhong Basin. He thus decided to remain behind to aid the Zhao imperial family in their war against the usurper, Ran Min.

The Later Zhao was eventually destroyed in 351, and Yao Yizhong soon died of illness at Shetou. He was succeeded by his son Yao Xiang, who at the behest of his father's dying wishes, went south to serve under the Eastern Jin dynasty. After a few years, he eventually rebelled and once more attempted to return to his homeland in the northwest. In 357, he was killed in battle by the Former Qin, and his younger brother, Yao Chang brought his remaining followers to surrender. Yao Chang became a fairly successful general under Former Qin, and during the Qin collapse that followed the disastrous Battle of Fei River in 383, he initially supported his lord, Fu Jian in fighting against the uprisings near the capital at Chang'an. However, after suffering a rout to Western Yan forces, Fu Jian threatened Yao Chang with execution for his failures. Fearing for his life, Yao Chang abandoned his post and fled north of the Wei River.

=== Reign of Yao Chang ===
Painted Pottery Female Musician Figurine, estimated to be dated from the late Former Qin to early Later Qin periods.

At the time, many of the local Han Chinese gentry clans and Qiang tribes had also lost faith in the Former Qin. Seeing Yao Chang as a suitable replacement, they gathered their followers in the tens of thousands to his location and urged him to lead their coalition. After some hesitation, Yao Chang agreed, assuming the title of Everlasting King of Qin in 384. To distinguish between the two, historiography often refer to his state as the "Later Qin" in contrast with the Fu clan's "Former Qin".

Yao Chang initially avoided Chang'an, instead allowing the Western Yan to besiege Fu Jian while he took over the commanderies to the north of the city. Eventually, Fu Jian fled from his capital, but was soon surrounded and captured by a Later Qin army. Fu Jian was brought before Yao Chang, who tried to force his former lord into formally abdicating the throne to him. When Fu Jian stubornly refused, Yao Chang ordered him strangled to death. Meanwhile, the Western Yan captured Chang'an, and after a brief occupation, they decided to leave to return to their homeland in the east. In 386, Yao Chang entered the city, where he elevated himself as the new Emperor of Qin.

After Fu Jian's death, his family members and other semi-independent forces in the Guanzhong Basin continued to oppose Yao Chang. A distant cousin of Fu Jian, Fu Deng, challenged Yao Chang's claim by also proclaiming himself as the Emperor of Qin. For the remainder of Yao Chang's rule, he was locked in a brutal protracted war with Fu Deng for supremacy over the Guanzhong. Fu Deng enjoyed early success as he repeatedly bested Yao Chang in battle. However, in 389, the tide of war shifted in favour of Yao Chang when he inflicted Fu Deng a crippling defeat at Dajie (大界, in modern Xianyang, Shaanxi). After the battle, Fu Deng was unable to launch further major offensives, leaving Yao Chang free to consolidate his power by subjugating the local minor warlords.

=== Early reign of Yao Xing and zenith of Later Qin ===
In 394, Yao Chang died of illness and was succeeded by his son and heir, Yao Xing. News of his death reached Fu Deng, who immediately mustered a large force to invade Later Qin amidst the confusion. Yao Xing sent an army to repel Fu Deng, and at the Battle of Feiqiao, the Later Qin won a decisive victory by crushing the Former Qin military. Fu Deng was forced into hiding before he was captured and executed by Yao Xing. A son of Fu Deng fled to Western Qin territory and claimed his father's title, but was killed in battle by Western Qin forces that same year. With the final defeat of the Fu clan, Yao Xing became the undisputed ruler of the Guanzhong Basin, and he soon restored the region to its former wealth and power.

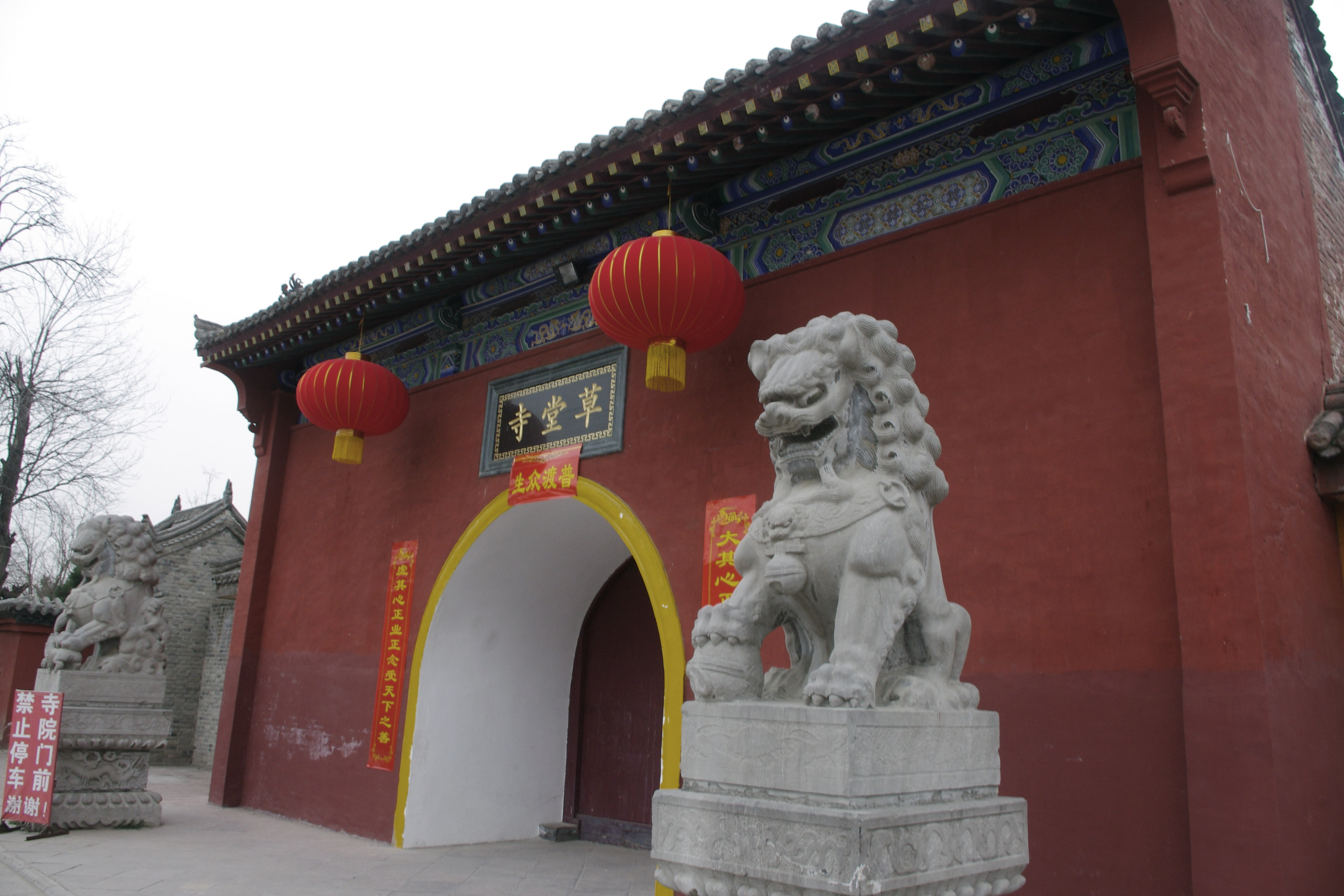
Caotang Temple in modern Xi'an, Shaanxi, first constructed by the Later Qin for Kumārajīva to carry out his translations and teachings. The temple underwent numerous renovations in the following centuries.

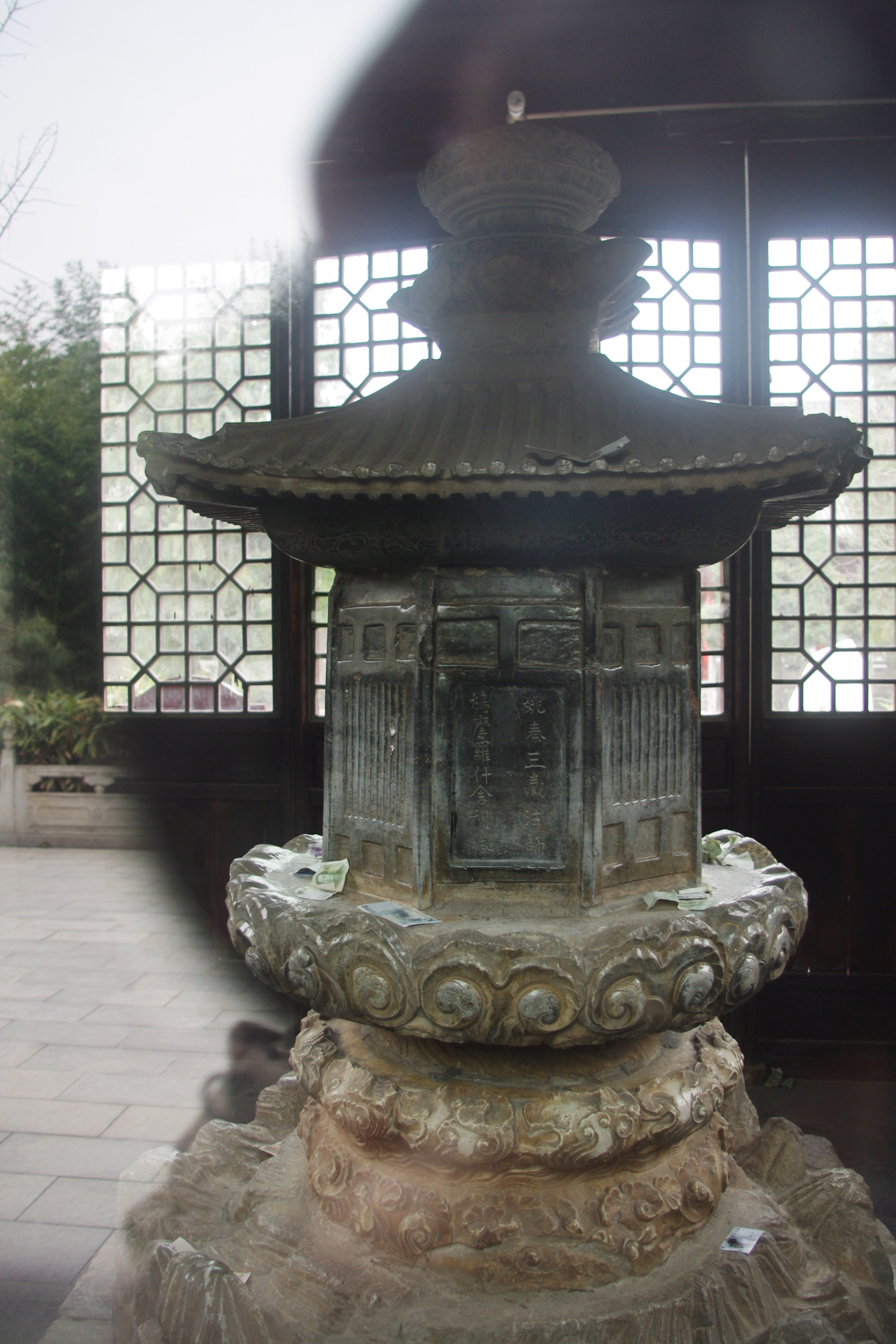
A stupa dedicated to Kumārajīva within the temple, built during the Tang dynasty.

Yao Xing inherited his father's title of Emperor, but in 399, he willingly demoted himself to the position of Heavenly King. Throughout his reign, Yao Xing strongly upheld Confucianism and emphasized education to the masses. Many famous scholars were invited by him to teach at Chang'an, and a Law Academy was even opened to train local officials in adjudication. Travelling students were also granted privileged freedom of movement within his territory, and it was reported that more than ten thousand people came from afar to study at Chang'an.

In external affairs, Yao Xing took a careful gradual approach to expanding his borders in the northwest. By 397, the Later Qin had brought the various nomadic Xiongnu and Xianbei tribes of the Hetao region under their sphere of influence. In 399, Yao Xing capitalized on the Eastern Jin civil war in southern China to annex the Henan, including the ancient Chinese capital of Luoyang. Meanwhile, his uncle, Yao Shuode, also led a series of military expeditions to the west, conquering the Western Qin in 400, and forcing the Later Liang into vassalage the following year. Fearing Later Qin's strength, the other states of the Hexi Corridor, Southern Liang, Northern Liang and Western Liang, also showed nominal deference to Yao Xing's sovereignty. In 403, the last Later Liang ruler abdicated his throne and handed his territory over to Later Qin. Finally, in 405, the Later Qin invaded Chouchi and received their submission, bringing the empire to its territorial peak.

Aside from Confucianism, Yao Xing was also an avid Buddhist and heavily promoted the religion in his domain. After subjugating the Later Liang in 401, Yao Xing ordered them to release Kumārajīva, a renowned Madhyamaka monk from Kucha who they had held captive. Yao Xing welcomed the monk to his court and appointed him to the venerated role of National Preceptor. Considered as one of the greatest translators of Chinese Buddhism, Kumārajīva led a large team of scholars in Chang'an to translate numerous Buddhist texts from Sanskrit to Chinese, including the Diamond Sutra and Lotus Sutra, which are still used commonly today. Many pagodas and temples were built throughout the empire, and it was claimed that around nine-tenths of the population had embraced Buddhism. Around this time, a Chinese monk named Faxian also began his journey from Chang'an to India in search for more Buddhist scriptures.

=== Decline and fall ===
In spite of success on the western frontier, the Later Qin's military weakness was exposed in 402. That year, the Xianbei-led Northern Wei, who controlled much of northeastern China, led an attack deep into the Hetao against one of Qin's vassal tribes. In retaliation, Yao Xing brought an army to invade Northern Wei, but suffered a humiliating defeat at the Battle of Chaibi. He was deterred from making further intrusions in the east and desperately sought a peaceful resolution with the Wei. When an agreement was finally reached by the two sides in 407, however, Helian Bobo, chieftain of the powerful Tiefu-Xiongnu vassal tribe in Hetao, responded by rebelling against Yao Xing and founding his own state of Helian Xia. Helian Bobo carried out a perpetual guerilla warfare against the Qin's northern borders, killing many of their generals and draining their economy. His rebellion encouraged the Southern Liang to seize Qin's holdings in the Hexi Corridor and renounce their vassalage that same year. In 410, the former rulers of the Western Qin also rebelled and restored their state in the Longxi Basin.

Meanwhile, in the south, the Eastern Jin was steadily recovering from their internal strife under the leadership of the paramount commander, Liu Yu. In 405, Liu Yu pressured the Later Qin into returning twelve commanderies in Henan back to Jin in exchange for peace, and in 407, Chouchi switched their allegiance to Jin. Yao Xing continued to receive submissions from the Southern Yan in Shandong and the Western Shu in Sichuan. However, in 410, he failed to provide reinforcements to the Southern Yan when Liu Yu invaded, resulting in Yan's demise. That same year, Yao Xing invaded Jin through Jing province in conjunction with Western Shu and the Jin rebel, Lu Xun, but was ultimately repelled. Both Western Shu and Lu Xun were later vanquished by Liu Yu's forces, and with mounting pressure from all sides, Yao Xing resorted to a marriage alliance with the Northern Wei.

Internally, the seeds for a succession crisis was also being laid by Yao Xing. He had appointed his eldest son, Yao Hong as Crown Prince, but only after some hesitation, as he showed more favour towards his younger son, Yao Bi. He entrusted Yao Hong with overseeing matters in Chang'an, while Yao Bi held military power along the northern frontier. Angered by his father's arrangements, Yao Bi plotted three coups to take the throne, all of which ended in failure. Yao Xing forgave his son for the first two attempts before finally forcing him to commit suicide after the third in 416. Despite his death, Yao Bi's other younger brothers and cousins were emboldened by his actions, and harboured their own ambitions to seize the throne from Yao Hong.

After Yao Xing died later in 416, Yao Hong's succession was immediately challenged by his brothers and cousins. The Xiongnu and Qiang tribes also staged their revolts, and the Xia, Chouchi and Western Qin took their chances to attack Later Qin. To deal with the threats, Yao Hong entrusted all military affairs over to his great-uncle, Yao Shao. Yao Shao had much initial success, but the chaos in Later Qin soon caught the attention of Liu Yu, who assembled a massive army to invade Qin. By late 417, Yao Shao had died of illness, and Jin forces under Wang Zhen'e had reached Chang'an. In the end, Yao Hong surrendered and was sent to the Jin capital, Jiankang, where he was executed. Members of the Yao clan who were imprisoned by Jin were exterminated, but few managed to survive by fleeing to the Northern Wei.

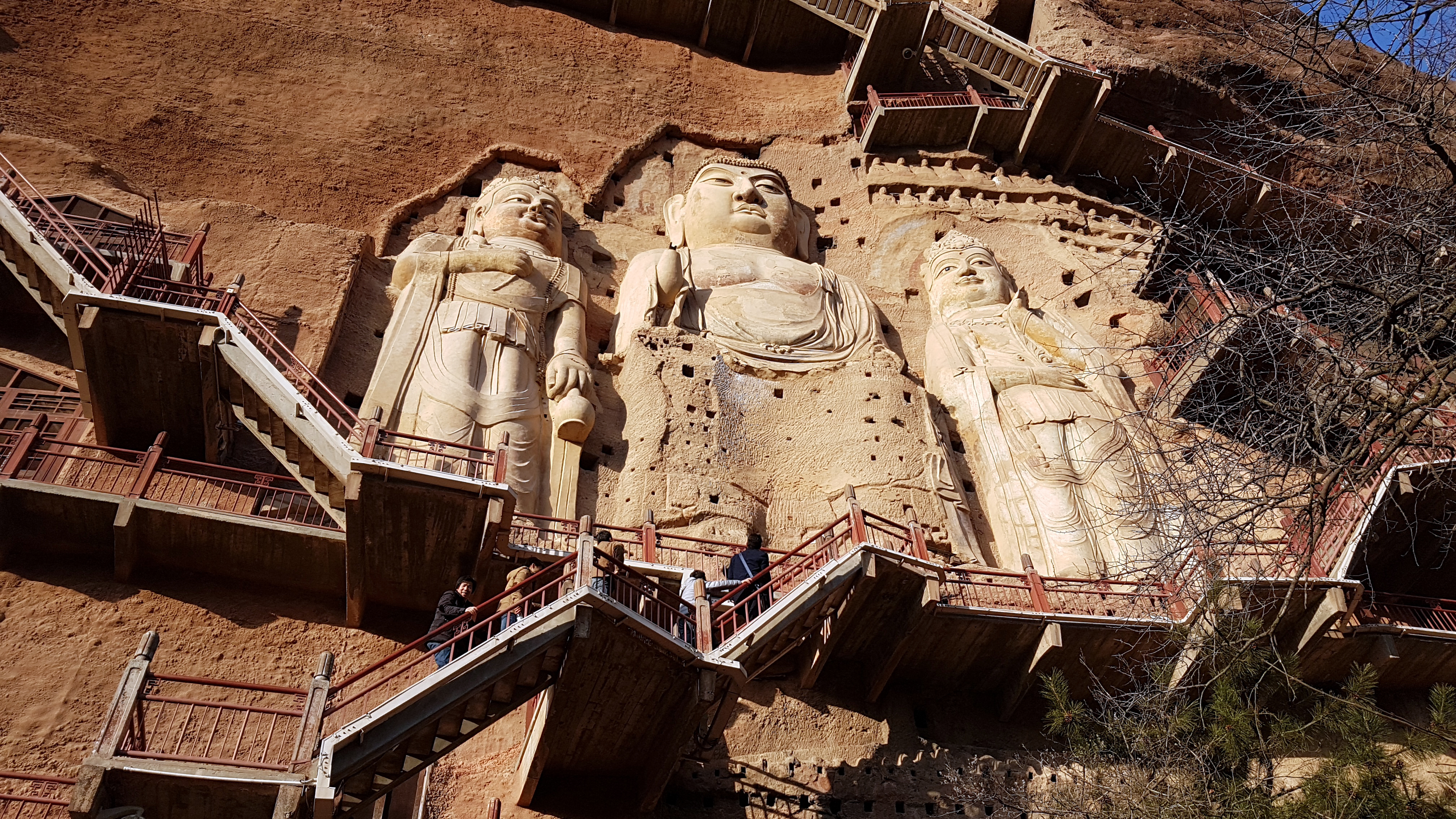
Maijishan Grottoes in modern-day Tianshui, Gansu. It a series of 194 rock-cut-caves that was first built during the Later Qin period. The grottoes were gradually expanded by later dynasties, all the way up to the Ming period.

== Rulers of the Later Qin ==
Temple name	Posthumous name	Personal name	Durations of reign	Era names
Taizu	Wuzhao	Yao Chang	384–393	Baique (白雀) 384–386; Jianchu (建初) 386–393
Gaozu	Wenhuan	Yao Xing	394–416	Huangchu (皇初) 394–399; Hongshi (弘始) 399–416
–	–	Yao Hong	416–417	Yonghe (永和) 416–417

== Rulers family tree ==
Later Qin rulers family tree

Yao Kehui 姚柯回
Yao Yizhong (280–352)
Yao Xiang 姚襄 (331–357)	Yao Chang 姚苌 (330–393); Wuzhao 武昭 (r. 384–(386–)394)
Yao Xing 姚兴 (366–416); Wenhuan 文桓 (r. 394–416)
Houzhu (Yao Hong) 侯主(姚泓); 388–417; r. 416–417

== See also ==
- Ethnic groups in Chinese history
- Five Barbarians
- Qiang (historical people)
- Chinese Buddhism
- Kumārajīva
- Maijishan Grottoes
