= Former Qin =

Di state (351–394) during the Sixteen Kingdoms period

Qin 秦
- 351–394 AD
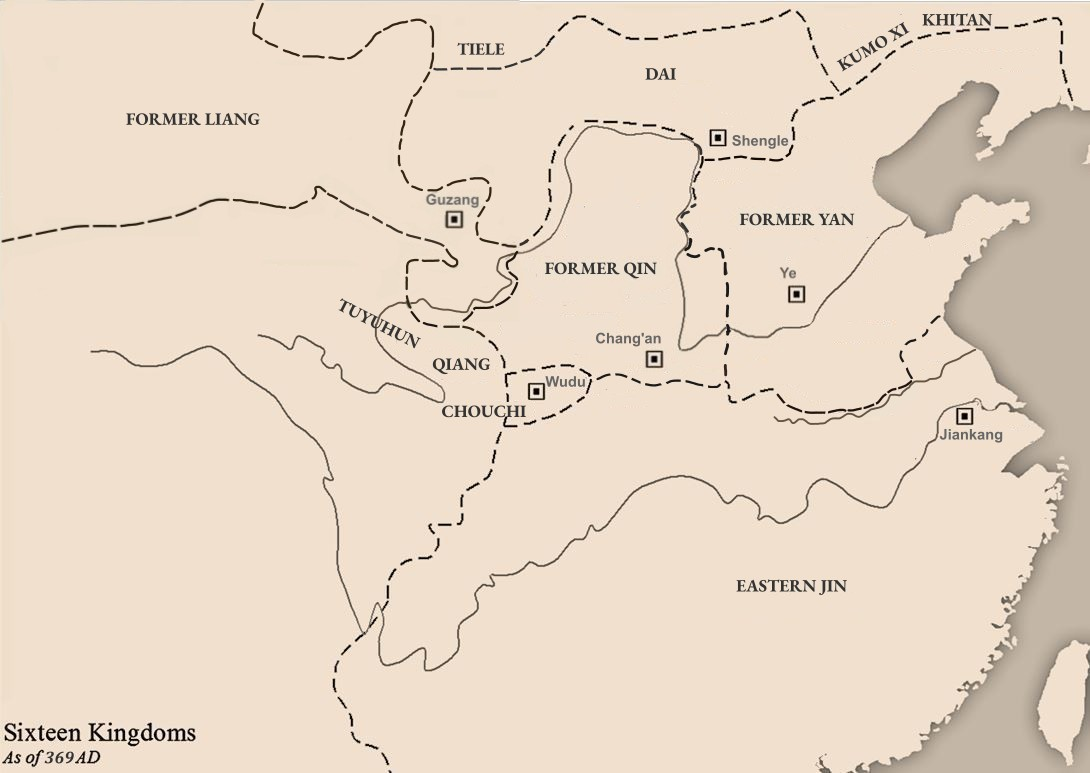
- Former Qin 369 CE

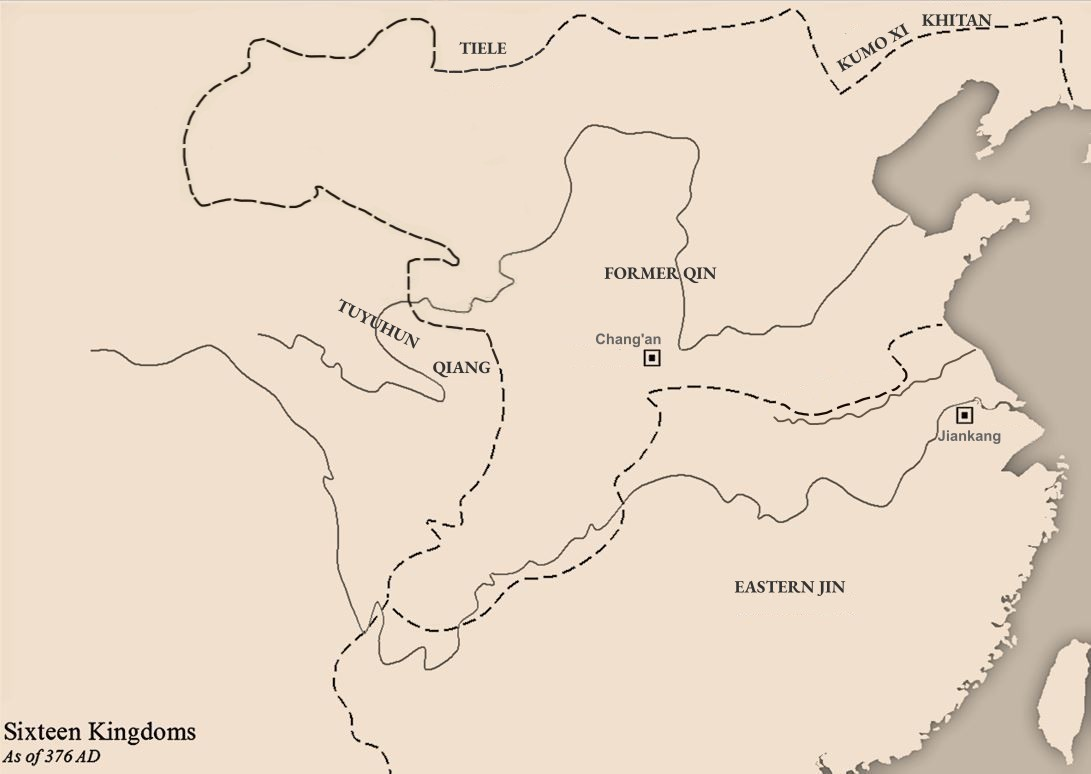
- Former Qin 376 CE
- Capital: Chang'an (351–385); Jinyang (385–386); Nan'an (386–387); Fort Hukong(387–394); Huangzhong (394)
- Government: Monarchy
- Emperor
  - 351–355: Fu Jiàn
  - 355–357: Fu Sheng
  - 357–385: Fu Jiān
  - 385–386: Fu Pi
  - 386–394: Fu Deng
  - 394: Fu Chong
- History
  - Fu Jiàn's entry into Chang'an: 350
  - Established: 4 March 351
  - Fu Jiàn's claim of imperial title: 352
  - Fu Jiān's destruction of Former Yan: 370
  - Battle of Fei River: 383
  - Fu Jiān's death: 16 October 385
  - Disestablished: 394 AD
  - Fu Hong's death: 405
Preceded by
Later Zhao
Former Yan
Former Liang
Dai (Sixteen Kingdoms)
Chouchi
Succeeded by
Later Yan
Later Qin
Later Liang (Sixteen Kingdoms)
Jin dynasty (266–420)
Northern Wei
Western Qin
Western Yan
Chouchi
- Today part of: China

Former Qin
- Chinese: 前秦
Transcriptions
Standard Mandarin
- Hanyu Pinyin: Qiánqín

Qin, known as the Former Qin and Fu Qin (苻秦) in historiography, was a dynastic state of China ruled by the Fu (Pu) clan of the Di peoples during the Sixteen Kingdoms period. Founded in the wake of the Later Zhao dynasty's collapse in 351 AD, it completed the unification of northern China in 376 AD during the reign of Fu Jiān (Emperor Xuanzhao), being the only state out of the Sixteen Kingdoms to achieve this. Its capital was Chang'an up to Fu Jiān's death in 385 AD. The prefix "Former" is used to distinguish it from the Later Qin and Western Qin dynasties that were founded later.

In 383 AD, the decisive defeat of the Former Qin by the Jin dynasty at the Battle of Fei River encouraged uprisings, splitting Former Qin territory into two noncontiguous pieces after the death of Fu Jiān. One remnant, at present-day Taiyuan, Shanxi was soon overwhelmed in 386 AD by the Xianbei under the Later Yan, Western Yan and the Dingling. The other struggled in greatly reduced territories around the border of present-day Shaanxi and Gansu until its final disintegration in 394 AD following years of invasions by Western Qin and Later Qin.

All rulers of Former Qin proclaimed themselves "Emperor", except for Fu Jiān who only claimed the title "Heavenly King" (Tian Wang). He was nonetheless posthumously considered an emperor by the Former Qin imperial court.

== History ==
=== Background ===
In the 4th century, Lüeyang Commandery (略陽郡; modern Tianshui, Gansu) was home to a large community of Di tribes, among who were the Fu clan of Linwei County (臨渭縣; in present-day Qin'an County, Gansu). It was recorded that the clan's original surname was Pu (蒲), and that they were descendants of the legendary Youhu tribe (有扈) who once dwelled around Chang'an during the ancient Xia period. During the fall of Western Jin, their chieftain, Pu Hong, gained renown among the Lüeyang Di, and he was soon elected as their leader to help them survive through the chaos.

Later on, Pu Hong became a vassal to the Xiongnu Han-Zhao dynasty, and then to the Jie-led Later Zhao. When Shi Hu seized control over the Zhao government in 333, Pu Hong rebelled, but soon surrendered and gained an audience with Shi Hu. Recognizing his vast influence among the Di, Shi Hu had Pu Hong and his family, as well as several Di and Qiang tribes from the Guanzhong and Longxi basins, resettled close to the capital region in the east. Pu Hong was appointed the Colonel Who Protects the Di (護氐校尉) with his headquarters at Fangtou (枋頭, in modern Hebi, Henan), and throughout Shi Hu's rule as sovereign, he was treated as a valuable general and advisor.

After Shi Hu's death in 349, Pu Hong was one of many involved in instigating the brutal power struggle for the throne among the Zhao princes. As the empire descended into civil war, he took the opportunity to lead his followers from Fangtou back to their homeland in Guanzhong, where he planned to establish his own independent state. Invoking a prophecy which stated, "He who is one with grass shall become king" (草付應王), he adopted the surname Fu (苻) by combining the first two characters of the prophecy. He then proclaimed himself as the King of the Three Qins, but his reign came to an abrupt end when he was assassinated by one of his own generals. His son and heir, Fu Jiàn quelled the rebellion and assumed leadership. Fu Jiàn disavowed his father's title and briefly submitted to the Eastern Jin dynasty in the south. However, after capturing Chang'an from local forces, he declared independence and claimed the title of Heavenly King of Qin in 351.

=== Reign of Fu Jiàn and Fu Sheng ===
Fu Jiàn further elevated himself to Emperor of Qin in 352. During his reign, he expanded his state by defeating remnants of the Later Zhao and wresting for control over the Longxi region with the Former Liang in the west. The most serious threat to his rule came in 354, when the Eastern Jin commander, Huan Wen launched his first northern expedition against the Qin. Fu Jiàn's forces were able to repel Huan Wen in the end, but mainly through the use of scorched earth strategy, and at the cost of Fu Jiàn's crown prince, who was killed in battle.

Not long after, Fu Jiàn died of illness in 355, and was succeeded by his son, Fu Sheng. Fu Sheng's reign was plagued by his conflict with his family members and high-ranking officials. Traditional histories depict him as a remarkably violent and erratic ruler with a penchant for murder. In external affairs, his armies forced the Former Liang into submission and later defeated the roving Qiang warlord, Yao Xiang, killing him and absorbing his remaining followers under his brother, Yao Chang. In 357, believing his cousins to be a danger to his rule, he plotted to have them executed, but one of them, Fu Jiān (note the different pinyin from his uncle and first ruler, Fu Jiàn) saw through his plans and overthrew him in a palace coup.

=== Rise of Fu Jiān and unification of northern China ===
Roof tile end from the Former Qin period with the inscription, "大秦龍興化牟古聖".

Upon ascending the throne, Fu Jiān reverted the imperial title back to the Heavenly King. Although his family and much of the Di elites were already relatively sincized, Fu Jiān styled himself as a model Confucian ruler and employed a Han Chinese named Wang Meng as his Prime Minister. With the help of Wang Meng, central authority was restored after a successful campaign to crack down on corruption and enforcing the law against the Di nobility. Agriculture and sericulture were heavily promoted to the masses, with irrigation projects being undertaken to develop farmlands. New schools were also founded while traditional Chinese rites and ceremonies were upheld. Roads and post stations were built to help facilitate trade, though commerce was restrained in favour of agriculture, a common policy among the pre-existing Chinese dynasties. Fu Jiān and Wang Meng's reforms allowed the Former Qin to recover from their early setbacks, and provided them with a base to carry out their military expansion.

In 365, Former Qin pacified the rebellious Tiefu-Xiongnu tribe and established control over the Ordos Plateau. Around this time, Fu Sheng's brothers, who Fu Jiān had spared and enfeoffed as dukes, also began a string of revolts against his rule, culminating in a large-scale rebellion in 368, but were all ultimately put down. The following year, the Former Qin received an urgent request for reinforcements by the Former Yan in the east, who was being invaded by Eastern Jin forces under Huan Wen. With Yan promising to cede the Luoyang region in return, Qin agreed, and together they succeeded in driving out Huan Wen from the north. However, Yan reneged on their promise, but Qin soon received the surrender of Yan's top general, Murong Chui. Emboldened by these turn of events, Fu Jiān ordered Wang Meng to lead his armies into conquering Yan. In 370, at the Battle of Luchuan, Wang Meng's outnumbered forces routed the main Yan army and subsequently entered their capital at Ye. The Emperor of Yan was captured and formally surrendered to Fu Jiān, thus ceding all of northeastern China to Qin.

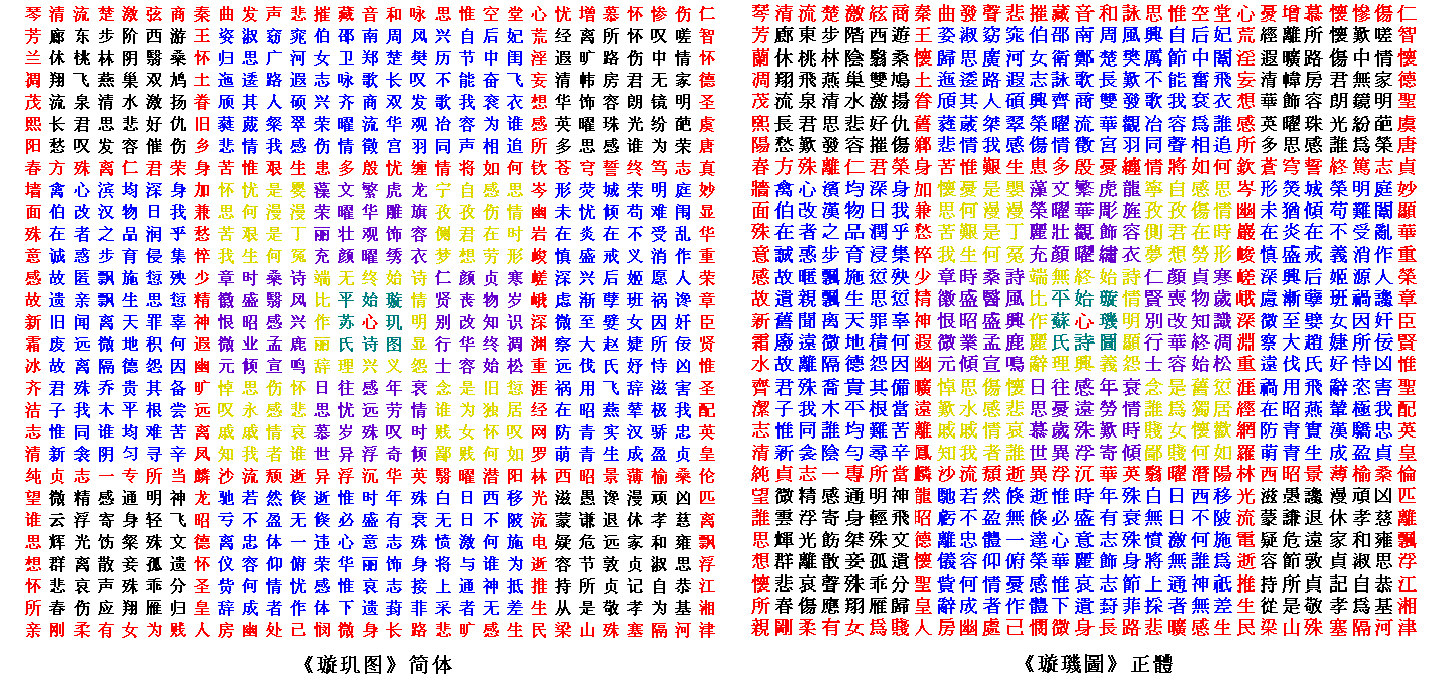
The Star Gauge (璇璣圖; Xuánjī Tú) palindrome, a famous poem written by Su Hui, a woman who lived under the Former Qin. Containing 841 characters, the palindrome can be read in different ways to generate over 3,000 shorter poems.

After the subjugation of Yan, Fu Jiān went on to unify the rest of northern China by conquering Chouchi in 371, and finally both of Former Liang and Dai in 376. His forces also captured the Sichuan Basin in southwestern China from the Eastern Jin in 373. Throughout his conquest, Fu Jiān was most known for his exceptional mercy towards his defeated enemies regardless of their ethnicity, even allowing them to serve as officials in his government and military. Former Qin's growing power soon attracted envoys from various foreign states, including from Silla and Goguryeo. Apart from his devotion to Confucianism, Fu Jiān also expressed interest in Buddhism. In 379, he welcomed the Buddhist monk, Dao'an into his court to serve as a political advisor. Later in 382, when he sent his Di general, Lü Guang on a military expedition to the Western Regions, he requested Lü Guang to retrieve the famed Mahayana monk, Kumārajīva from the state of Kucha.

=== Battle of Fei River ===
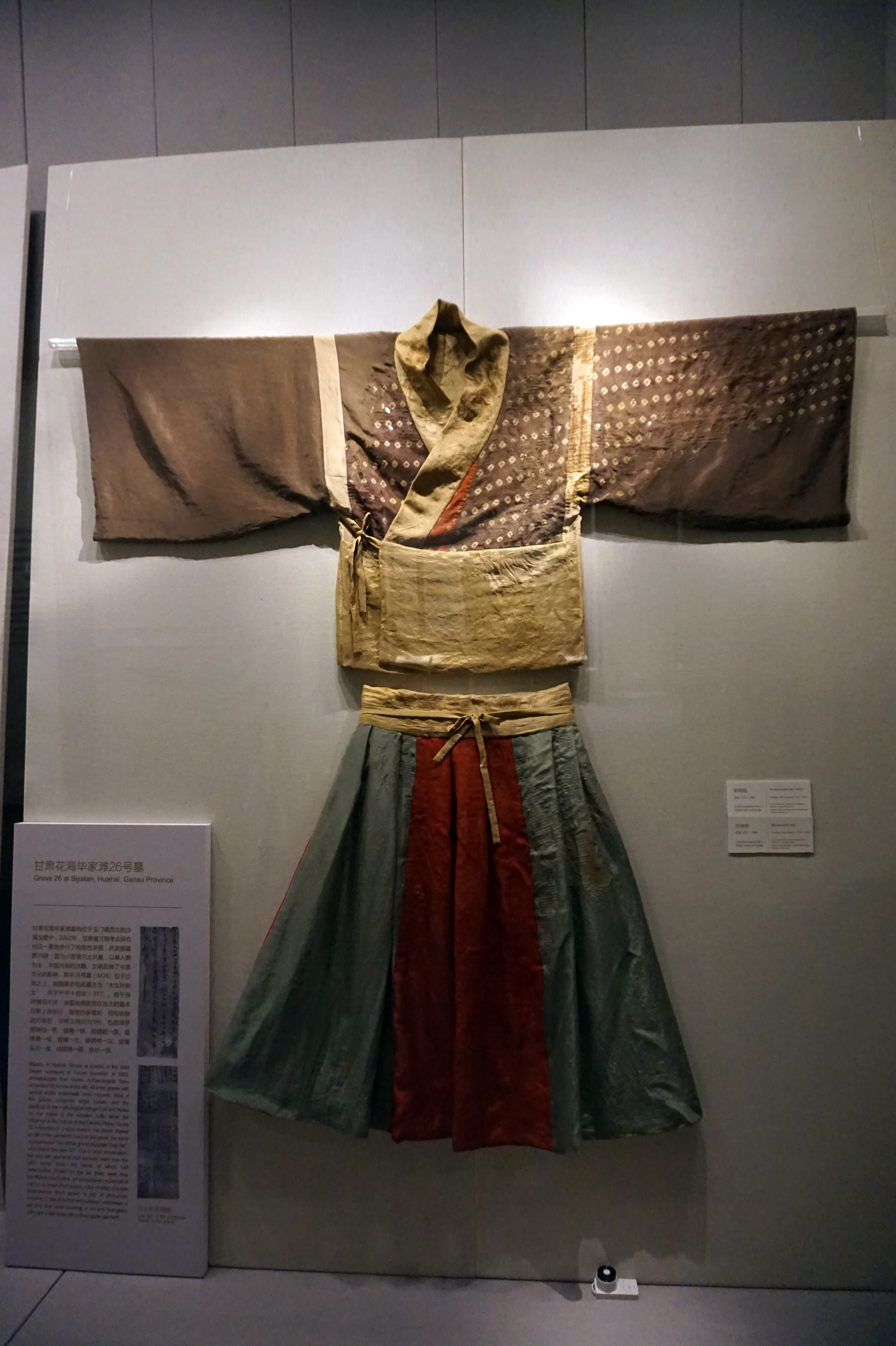
Skirt and jacket found in a tomb from the Former Qin era.

With only the Eastern Jin left standing, Fu Jiān set his sights on completing the full reunification of China. Wang Meng died of illness in 375, and before his death, he warned Fu Jiān against going to war with Jin, stating that the southlands were still politically stable to launch a united front. Furthermore, as Qin grew exponentially within the span of a few years, most of their new subjects were not properly integrated and only nominally loyal to the regime. Wang Meng thus advised his lord to focus internally on consolidating his rule, and to suppress the power of the Qiang and Xianbei people under him. However, Fu Jiān remained adamant on reunifying China. Addressing Wang Meng's latter concerns, large-scale resettlements were carried out to disperse the ethnic populations across the empire, such as the Xianbei to the Guanzhong Basin and the Di to the Hebei region. Fu Jiān also began pivoting towards the Di nobility by granting them important regional commands, but his attempts at consolidation only alienated him from his non-Di followers.

In 378, Former Qin forces besieged the Jin city of Xiangyang and attacked Pengcheng. Although Xiangyang fell to Qin the following year, the assault on Pengcheng was defeated by the Jin general, Xie Xuan. In 383, despite opposition from most of his ministers, Fu Jiān invaded Jin with a massive army, with records claiming their number to be at around 870,000 strong. The Former Qin captured Shouchun before facing the Jin army led by Xie An at the Battle of Fei River. Despite his numerical advantage, Fu Jiān hesitated to cross the river and agreed to a proposal by the enemy to slightly retreat so that they could cross to his side to fight. Just as they moved, however, a mole within the Qin army shouted that the battle was lost, causing widespread panic among their ranks. The Qin soldiers fled in disarray while the Jin army pursued and dealt them a disastrous defeat. Fu Jiān himself was injured in battle and barely escaped to the north.

=== Disintegration and fall ===
In 384, before Former Qin could recover from their recent losses, Murong Chui rebelled in Hebei and founded the Later Yan, intending to restore his family's fallen empire. Not long after, news of his rebellion prompted his nephew, Murong Hong to gather the resettled Xianbei in the Guanzhong and launch his own revolt by establishing the Western Yan. Fu Jiān attempted to fight back against the uprisings, but soon, his general Yao Chang also rebelled with the support of the Han gentry and Qiang tribes north of the Wei River, founding the Later Qin. Fu Jiān was placed under siege at Chang'an by the Western Yan and later fled the city in 385. However, he was then captured by Yao Chang, who had him strangled to death after he refused to formally pass the throne.

Warrior figurines unearthed from a tomb in Xi'an, estimated to be dated from the late Former Qin to early Later Qin periods.

More rebellions continued to break out in other parts of the empire. In 385, the Qifu-Xianbei tribe formed the Western Qin in the Longxi and the Chouchi state was restored in Longnan. In 386, Lü Guang, returning from the Western Regions, seized the Hexi Corridor and founded the Later Liang, while the Tuoba-Xianbei restored their state of Dai on the northern steppe, which later became known as the Northern Wei dynasty. Meanwhile, Xie Xuan led Eastern Jin forces to recover lost territory, pushing all the way to the Yellow River. Fu Jiān's son, Fu Pi, declared himself emperor in 385 and sought to restore Former Qin's authority from Jinyang in modern-day Shanxi, but was later driven out by the Western Yan. His brief reign came to an end when he was killed by Jin forces while trying to capture Luoyang in 386.

At Nan'an Commandery (南安郡; southeast of present-day Longxi County, Gansu) in the west, a distant cousin of Fu Jiān, Fu Deng was acclaimed the new emperor after receiving news of Fu Pi's death. For most his reign, Fu Deng waged war against Yao Chang for control over the Guanzhong Basin. He repeatedly defeated Yao Chang in battle early on, but after suffering a crippling loss in 389, Fu Deng was unable to launch any further substantive campaigns for the next few years. In 394, when Yao Chang died of illness, Fu Deng took advantage of the situation to muster one final assault on Later Qin. At the Battle of Feiqiao, the Former Qin army was cut off from their water supply, resulting in a total rout. Fu Deng was forced into hiding before he was captured and executed by the new Emperor of Later Qin, Yao Xing. His son, Fu Chong, fled to Huangzhong (湟中, in modern Xining, Qinghai) in Western Qin territory and assumed his throne. However, he was soon killed in battle by Western Qin forces, marking the final end of the Former Qin dynasty.

== Rulers of the Former Qin ==
Temple name	Posthumous name	Personal name	Durations of reigns	Era names
Gaozu	Jingming	Fu Jian (苻健)	351–355	Huangshi (皇始) 351–355
–	King Li¹	Fu Sheng	355–357	Shouguang (壽光) 355–357
Shizu	Xuanzhao	Fu Jian (苻堅)	357–385	Yongxing (永興) 357–359 Ganlu (甘露) 359–364; Jianyuan (建元) 365–385
–	Aiping	Fu Pi	385–386	Taian (太安) 385–386
Taizong	Gao	Fu Deng	386–394	Taichu (太初) 386–394
–	–	Fu Chong	several months in 394	Yanchu (延初) 394

¹ Fu Sheng was posthumously given the title "wang" even though he had reigned as emperor.

== Rulers family tree ==
Former Qin

Fu Huaigui 苻懷歸
Fu Hong (苻洪) 285–350; Huiwu
Fu Jian (苻健) 317–355; Jingming 景明 (r. 352–355)	Fu Xiong	Fu Chang
Fu Sheng (苻生) 335–357; Li 厲 (r. 355–357)	Fu Jian 苻堅 (337–385); Xuanzhao 宣昭 (r. 357–385)	Fu Deng 苻登 (343–394); Gao 高 (r. 386–394)
Fu Pi 苻丕 (d. 386); Aiping 哀平 (r. 385–386)	Fu Chong (苻崇) d. 394; r. 394

== See also ==
- Battle of Fei River
- Di (Five Barbarians)
- Five Barbarians
- Su Hui (poet)
- Wang Meng
