= Tufa (disambiguation) =

Tufa is a porous variety of limestock rock.

Tufa may also refer to:

== People ==
- Tufa (general), Germanic warrior active in 5th century Italy
- Tufa, the founding family of Southern Liang, a state during the Chinese Jin Dynasty
  - Tufa Wugu (died 399), founding prince of Southern Liang
  - Tufa Lilugu (died 402), second ruler of Southern Liang
  - Tufa Rutan (365–415), last ruling prince of Southern Liang
  - Queen Tufa (died 423), daughter of Tufa Rutan
- Tufa (Amharic: ቱፋ), a male given name
  - Firehiwot Tufa Dado (born 1984), Ethiopian marathon runner
  - Mestawet Tufa (born 1983), Ethiopian long-distance runner

== Other uses ==
- Tufa River, a tributary of the Prahova River in Romania
- Tufa, a fictional clan of fairies in Alex Bledsoe's fantasy novel, The Hum and the Shiver

== See also ==
- 2FA, or two-factor authentication
