= Yao Shuode's Western Expeditions =

5th-century military campaigns in China

Date	July or August 400 – September or October 401
Location	Gansu
Result	Later Qin victory; Annexation of Western Qin; Submission of Later, Southern, Northern and Western Liang

Belligerents
Later Qin	1st expedition: Western Qin 2nd expedition: Later Liang

Commanders and leaders
Yao Xing; Yao Shuode	Qifu Gangui (surrendered); Lü Long (surrendered)

Strength
50,000+ (1st expedition); 67,000+ (2nd expedition)	60,000+ (Western Qin)

Yao Shuode's Western Expeditions were a series of two successful campaigns by the Later Qin dynasty against the states of Western Qin and Later Liang from 400 to 401 during the Sixteen Kingdoms period. These expeditions, led by the general, Yao Shuode, ended in the submission of the Western Qin and the four Liangs (Later, Southern, Northern and Western), as well as the arrival of the Buddhist monk and translator, Kumārajīva at the Qin court in Chang'an.

== Background ==
After defeating the rival Former Qin in 394, the Later Qin, led by the Yao clan of Qiang ethnicity, asserted their hegemony over the Guanzhong region. The emperor, Yao Xing ruled diligently over his territory, allowing the region to recover after many years of war, and later expanded eastward by swiftly capturing Luoyang and its surrounding commanderies from the Eastern Jin dynasty in 399. All the while to the west of them, the Later Liang and Western Qin were waging a prolonged war against one another, draining both of their resources and manpower. After a failed invasion against Western Qin in 397, the states of Southern Liang and Northern Liang broke away from the Later Liang, reducing them to the areas around their capital, Guzang (姑臧, in modern Wuwei, Gansu).

== First expedition: Western Qin ==
=== Invasion of Longxi ===
In July or August 400, Yao Xing's uncle, the Duke of Longxi, Yao Shuode, led 50,000 soldiers through the Nan'an Gorge (南安峽; northeast present-day Qin'an County, Gansu) to invade the Western Qin. The ruler of Western Qin, Qifu Gangui brought his generals over to resist the Later Qin at the Longxi.

At Longxi, Gangui ordered Qifu Muwu (乞伏慕兀) and the others to set defensive camps. While Shuode's army were collecting firewood, the Western Qin forces cut him off from his supply and communication. Yao Xing secretly brought his forces over to reinforce them, but Gangui saw through him and garrisoned Muwu with the main army of 20,000 strong at Baiyang (柏楊; in present-day Tianshui, Gansu). He also sent another general, Luo Dun with the external army of 40,000 troops to camp at Houcheng Valley (侯辰谷), while he himself led several thousand light cavalry to scout the Qin army.

However, as Gangui was scouting, a strong wind blew and a great fog appeared. He was isolated from his main army, and Yao Xing sent his cavalry to chase after them. Gangui joined up with the external army, and when the sun came out, they engaged with the Later Qin forces but were greatly routed. Gangui fled to his capital, Yuanchuan (苑川, in modern Baiyin, Gansu) while 36,000 of his soldiers surrendered. Yao Xing then advanced to occupy Fuhan (枹罕, in modern Linxia, Gansu) .

=== Qifu Gangui surrenders ===
Gangui fell back to Jincheng (金城; in modern Yuzhong County, Gansu), where he instructed his generals to part ways and surrender to the Later Qin. He then fled to Yunwu (允吾; in present-day Gaolan County, Gansu) with only a few hundred cavalry, intending to hold out and submit to the Southern Liang. The ruler of Southern Liang, Tufa Lilugu accepted him, but then the Later Qin army withdrew from Gangui's territory. He was secretly invited by a chieftain of the Southern Qiang, Liang Ge (梁戈) to rebel, but a subordinate leaked the plot to Lilugu, who then ordered Tufa Tulei to camp at the Mentian Ranges (捫天嶺; west of present-day Yongjing County, Gansu) with 3,000 cavalry. Afraid that Lilugu was about to kill him, Gangui sent his son, Qifu Chipan and his family as hostages Lilugu's capital at Xiping before fleeing to Later Qin in late August or September.

When Gangui arrived at the Later Qin court in Chang'an, Yao Xing was overjoyed, appointing him as the Chief Controller of the south of the Yellow River and Inspector of He Province, as well as enfeoffing him as the Marquis of Guiyi. He sent Gangui back to guard Yuanchuan and allowed him to retain his old followers.Qifu Chipan was also able to escape from Southern Liang and reunite with his father.

== Second expedition: Later Liang ==
=== Siege of Guzang ===
In May or June 401, Yao Shuode received envoys from Jiao Lang (焦朗) of Later Liang, detailing the chaotic situation in his state and urging him to come. He was informed that the Later Liang ruler, Lü Long was fighting with his brothers and that many of the people had died of starvation. Shuode reported his findings to Yao Xing before assembling 60,000 soldiers to campaign against Later Liang. Qifu Gangui also followed him with 7,000 cavalry.

Yao Shuode set out from Jincheng and crossed to the Yellow River, making his way through Southern Liang territory in Guangwu (廣武郡; around present-day Yongdeng County, Gansu); Lilugu recalled his forces from Guangwu to avoid conflict with the Qin forces. The Qin then advanced towards Guzang. Lü Long dispatched Lü Chao and Lü Miao (呂邈) to repel them, but Yao Shuode greatly defeated them. He captured Lü Miao and captured or killed tens of thousands of Liang soldiers. Lü Long withdrew back into his capital to mount a defence while Lü Tuo (呂佗) brought 20,000 men to surrender from Eastern Yuancheng (東苑城; outside of Guzang).

A year prior, the Western Liang was established Dunhuang after breaking away from Northern Liang. When they heard that the Later Qin was besieging Guzang, the Western Liang, the Northern Liang and the Southern Liang all sent their envoys offering their submission to Yao Xing. In August or September, the Southern Liang general, Jiang Ji defected to Qin with several dozen followers. At his request, he was granted 2,000 infantry to join the siege and camped at Yanran (晏然; northwest of present-day Wuwei, Gansu).

After more than a month of siege, many easterners living in the city plotted to surrender the city to Qin. The Liang general, Wei Yiduo (魏益多) wanted to gather their support to assassinate Lü Long and his brother, Lü Chao, but their plot was uncovered, and more than 300 families were executed. Meanwhile, Shuode treated the surrounding Chinese and tribal people with care and received their submission. He divided up the territory and assigned the local officials to administer them. In preparation for a long siege, he also rationed and stockpiled his grain supplies.

Soon, the Later Liang court wanted Lü Long to surrender. He initially refused, but at the advice of Lü Chao, he finally agreed. In September or October, Lü Long sent his envoys to convey his surrender to Later Qin. He also sent more than 50 families to Chang'an as hostages, while Yao Shuode petitioned for him to be granted office and a dukely title. Shuode kept his men under strict discipline, forbidding them from harming the people, and paid respect to the local prominent figures, both dead and alive. The people of Later Liang commended his conduct, but as he had exhausted his grain supply, he decided to withdraw back to Qin.

== Aftermath ==
With the annexation of Western Qin and the submission of the four Liangs, the Later Qin reached the zenith of their power. Among the people sent from Later Liang was a Kuchean Buddhist monk named Kumārajīva. He had been living under the Lü clan as a hostage, and Yao Xing, who was infatuated by Buddhism, wanted to employ his talents in translating the Buddhist texts into Chinese. For the next decade in Chang'an, he was treated as a great teacher and translated many sutras and treatises, becoming known as one of the most important translators of Buddhist texts in Chinese history.

On the other hand, the control that Later Qin had over the Liang states was nominal at best as they continued to wage war against each other. By 403, Lü Long could no longer withstand the pressure from Northern Liang and Southern Liang and gave up his remaining territory to Qin. Unable to properly manage from afar, Yao Xing decided to grant the region to the Southern Liang to reward their loyalty, but in 407, the Southern Liang disavowed their vassalage and cut the Qin off from the Hexi Corridor. Qifu Gangui, who remained in the Longxi, would also rebel and restore his state of Western Qin in 409.

== Sources ==
- Xiong, Victor Cunrui (2017), Historical Dictionary of Medieval China, Rowman & Littlefield Publishers
- Felbur, Rafa (2018), "Essays of Sengzhao", Three Short Treatises: by Vasubandhu, Sengzhao, and Zongmi, BDK America, pp. 77 & 125
- Book of Jin
- Zizhi Tongjian
