= Qifu =

Qifu (Chinese: 乞伏) may refer to various royal family members of the Xianbei-led Chinese Western Qin dynasty.

- Qifu Guoren (Chinese: 乞伏國仁; died 388), founding monarch
- Qifu Gangui (Chinese: 乞伏乾歸; died 412), prince
- Qifu Chipan (Chinese: 乞伏熾磐; died 428), prince
- Qifu Mumo (Chinese: 乞伏暮末; died 431), last prince
