= Henan Wang =

Henan Wang (Chinese: 河南王, King/Prince of Henan) may refer to:

- Shen Yang (Eighteen Kingdoms) (fl. 206/205 BC), ruler of Henan during the Qin–Han transition
- Qifu Gangui (died 412), Western Qin ruler, reigned as King/Prince of Henan after 388
- Qifu Chipan (died 428), Western Qin ruler, reigned as King/Prince of Henan after 411
- Hou Jing (died 552), warlord during the Northern and Southern Dynasties period, briefly known as Prince of Henan in 547 during the Liang dynasty
- Yang Zhao (584–606), Sui dynasty imperial prince, known as Prince of Henan from 590 to 601
- Köke Temür (died 1375), late Yuan dynasty warlord, known as Prince of Henan from 1365 to 1368
