= Taichu =

Taichu may refer to:

- Taichung, Taiwan, known as Taichū in Japanese
- Taichū Prefecture, former name of Taichung

== Historical eras ==
- Taichu (104BC–101BC), an era name used by Emperor Wu of Han
- Taichu (386–394), an era name used by Fu Deng, emperor of Former Qin
- Taichu (388–400), an era name used by Qifu Gangui, ruler of Western Qin
- Taichu (397–399), an era name used by Tufa Wugu, ruler of Southern Liang
- Taichu (453), an era name used by Liu Shao (Liu Song), emperor of Liu Song
