= Juqu Mengxun =

Prince Wenxuan of Northern Liang 北涼武宣王
- Prince of Liang

Ruler of Northern Liang
- Reign: 401–433
- Predecessor: Duan Ye
- Successor: Juqu Mujian
- Born: 368
- Died: 433 (aged 64–65)
- Burial: Yuan Mausoleum (元陵)
Full name
- Family name: Jǔqú (沮渠); Given name: Méngxùn (蒙遜)
Era dates
- Yǒng'ān (永安): 401–412; Xuánshǐ (玄始): 412–428; Chéngxuán (承玄): 428–430; Yìhé (義和): 430–433
Regnal name
- 401–412: Grand Commander, Grand General, Governor of Liang Province, Duke of Zhangye (大都督 大將軍 涼州牧 張掖公); 412–431: Prince of Hexi (河西王) since 431: Prince of Liang (涼王)
Posthumous name
- Prince Wǔxuān (武宣王, lit. "martial and responsible")
Temple name
- Tàizǔ (太祖)
- House: Juqu
- Dynasty: Northern Liang

Juqu Mengxun (Chinese: 沮渠蒙遜; 368–433), also known by his posthumous name as the Prince Wuxuan of Northern Liang (北涼武宣王), was the second prince of the Lushuihu-led Chinese Northern Liang dynasty, and the first from the Juqu clan. His cousin Juqu Nancheng (沮渠男成) and he initially supported Duan Ye as prince of Northern Liang in 397 after rebelling against the Later Liang dynasty, but in 401, Juqu Mengxun tricked Duan Ye into wrongly executing Juqu Nancheng, and then used that as an excuse to attack and kill Duan Ye, taking over the throne himself. While he maintained his own state, he also nominally served as a vassal of the Later Qin, Eastern Jin, and Northern Wei dynasties. He was considered a capable ruler when he was young, but in his old age was considered cruel and arbitrary.

== Under Later Liang and Duan Ye ==
Juqu Mengxun was born in 368, while the area that would later be his domain was under the rule of Former Liang, but little is known about his early years. He was of Lushuihu ethnicity, and it was said that his ancestors served as the left Juqu (an office title of unclear responsibility) for the Xiongnu Chanyus, and so they started using Juqu as the family name. Later, during Former Qin and Later Liang rule, Juqu Mengxun became known for broad knowledge in history and military tactics and thought to be both humorous and full of strategies, and became feared by the Former Qin governor Liang Xi (梁熙) and the Later Liang emperor Lü Guang, and so he tried to divert attention from himself by drinking heavily and spending time on frivolous matters.

In 397, Lü Guang sent his brother Lü Yan (呂延) on an attack against Western Qin, but Lü Yan was killed in a trap set by the Western Qin prince Qifu Gangui. Juqu Mengxun's uncles Juqu Luochou (沮渠羅仇) and Juqu Quzhou (沮渠麴粥) were Lü Yan's assistants, and in light of Lü Yan's death, Lü Guang believed false accusations against them and executed them. Juqu Mengxun escorted their caskets back to their home territory of Zhangye (modern Zhangye, Gansu) and then persuaded the various Lushuihu tribes to rise against Later Liang. Initially, he was defeated by Lü Guang's son Lü Zuan and fled into the mountains, but he was soon joined in rebellion by his cousin Juqu Nancheng (沮渠男成), who sieged Jiankang (also in modern Zhangye) and persuaded Duan Ye the governor of Jiankang Commandery to accept leadership of the rebels, establishing Northern Liang. Soon, Lü Guang came under the greater threat of a rebellion by Guo Nen (郭黁) and recalled Lü Zuan to face that threat, and Duan Ye's nascent state survived. Juqu Mengxun joined Duan Ye, and was made a major general of the state. In 398, Duan Ye sent him on an expedition against Lü Guang's nephew Lü Chun (呂純), and Juqu Mengxun captured Lü Chun, causing all remaining Later Liang cities west of Zhangye to submit to Northern Liang, further enlarging Northern Liang territory. Duan Ye therefore created Juqu Mengxun the Marquess of Linchi. Lü Guang's son Lü Hong (呂弘) soon abandoned Zhangye, and Duan Ye moved his capital to Zhangye, and tried to further pursue Lü Hong against Juqu Mengxun's advice. Lü Hong defeated him and nearly killed him, but Juqu Mengxun saved Duan Ye. In 399, when Duan Ye claimed the title of Prince of Liang, he made Juqu Mengxun one of his two prime ministers, sharing responsibilities with Liang Zhongyong (梁中庸). Later that year, when Northern Liang was under attack by Lü Guang's crown prince Lü Shao and Lü Zuan, it was at Juqu Mengxun's suggestion that Duan Ye refused to engage, forcing Lü Shao and Lü Zuan to retreat when Southern Liang relief forces under Tufa Lilugu arrived. In 400, when the general Wang De (王德) rebelled, Duan Ye sent Juqu Mengxun to attack him, and Juqu Mengxun defeated him and, while he fled, captured his wife and children.

By 401, however, Duan Ye was heavily apprehensive of Juqu Mengxun's strategies and abilities, and he considered sending Juqu Mengxun far away. Juqu Mengxun, knowing Duan Ye's suspicions, tried to hide his ambitions. However, at the same time, because he was often insulted by another official that Duan Ye heavily relied on, Ma Quan (馬權), he falsely accused Ma of treason, and Duan Ye killed Ma. Juqu Mengxun then told Juqu Nancheng that he felt that Duan Ye lacked abilities and was an inappropriate ruler, trying to persuade Juqu Nancheng to rise against Duan Ye. When Juqu Nancheng refused, Juqu Mengxun requested to leave the capital to be the governor of Xi'an Commandery (also in modern Zhangye), and Duan Ye agreed. Juqu Mengxun then set a trap for both Juqu Nancheng and Duan Ye -- he made an appointment with Juqu Nancheng to offer sacrifices to the god of Lanmen Mountain (near Zhangye) on a vacation day, but submitting a false report through the official Xu Xian (許咸) that Juqu Nancheng was set to rebel and would start the rebellion on a day that he requested permission to sacrifice to the god of Lanmen Mountain. When Juqu Nancheng requested Duan Ye for such permission, Duan Ye arrested him and ordered him to commit suicide. Juqu Nancheng, who had realized Juqu Mengxun's plan by this point, told Duan Ye that this was a sign that Juqu Mengxun was about to rebel and that he should keep Juqu Nancheng alive, and then when Juqu Mengxun rebels he could counterattack. Duan Ye, not believing in Juqu Nancheng, executed him. Juqu Mengxun then cited Duan Ye's execution of Juqu Nancheng to ask his people to rise against Duan Ye, and the people indeed rose in rebellion, because of the high regard they had for Juqu Nancheng. The rebels quickly arrived at Zhangye, and it fell. Despite Duan Ye's pleas, Juqu Mengxun executed him. The Northern Liang officials all endorsed Juqu Mengxun to take over the throne, and he took throne with the title Duke of Zhangye.

== Early reign ==
Juqu Mengxun, having taken the ducal title, promoted a number of officials who were considered capable, and it was said that the people of his state were pleased. He also nominally submitted to the Later Qin emperor Yao Xing as a vassal, although remaining in reality independent. However, he immediately faced the crisis that his Jiuquan (酒泉) and Liangning (涼寧) Commanderies (roughly modern Jiuquan, Gansu) rebelled against him and joined Western Liang. He became fearful, and he sent his brother Juqu Ru (沮渠挐) the Marquess of Dugu and official Zhang Qian (張潜) to meet Yao Xing's uncle Yao Shuode (姚碩德), who had just recently sieged Later Liang's capital Guzang (姑臧, in modern Wuwei, Gansu) and forced the Later Liang emperor Lü Long to submit, offering to surrender his state to Later Qin. Yao Shuode was pleased, but upon return to Northern Liang, while Zhang recommended such surrender, Juqu Ru argued against it, and Juqu Mengxun, while remaining nominally a Later Qin vassal, executed Zhang and never actually surrendered his state. He also tried to make peace with Southern Liang's prince Tufa Lilugu, initially sending his son Juqu Xi'nian (沮渠奚念) as a hostage to Southern Liang, but Tufa Lilugu rejected Juqu Xi'nian, stating that he was too young to be a meaningful hostage and demanding Juqu Ru instead. After initially refusing, Juqu Mengxun gave in to Southern Liang demands after Tufa Lilugu defeated him in battle.

In 402, with Guzang under a severe famine, Juqu Mengxun attacked Later Liang, causing Lü Long to seek aid from Southern Liang, but before Southern Liang forces could arrive, Lü Long defeated Juqu Mengxun, and Juqu Mengxun made peace with Lü Long, offering him food for famine relief.

Around the new year 403, Liang Zhongyong, who continued to be a key official after Juqu Mengxun took over for Duan Ye, fled from his domain and joined Western Liang's prince Li Gao. Rather than killing Liang's wife and children as might be expected, Juqu Mengxun sent them to Liang, commenting, "I treated Liang like a brother, but he did not trust me. He did not betray me, but himself; I do not mind losing a man."

Later that year, because Juqu Mengxun and Tufa Lilugu were constantly attacking him and draining his state's resources, Lü Long felt he could not maintain his state any more, and he surrendered his state (now consisting of little more than Guzang) to Later Qin. He also persuaded the Later Qin general Qi Nan (齊難) to attack Juqu Mengxun, but Juqu Mengxun repelled Qi's attack and then made peace with Qi. Juqu Mengxun sent Juqu Ru (who must have somehow been returned from Southern Liang by this point) to the Later Qin capital Chang'an to declare his submission to Yao Xing. Later that year, having received reports that his two uncles and generals Juqu Qinxin (沮渠親信) and Juqu Kongdu (沮渠孔篤) were corrupt and harmful to the people, he forced to commit suicide. Meanwhile, he accepted the title that Yao Xing created him, the Marquess of Xihai, to show submission, despite his initial displeasure that Tufa Lilugu's brother and successor Tufa Rutan was created a duke while he was only created a marquess.

In 405, Li Gao moved his capital from Dunhuang (敦煌, in modern Dunhuang, Gansu) to Jiuquan, to be closer to Zhangye to exert pressure on Juqu Mengxun.

In spring 406, Tufa Rutan launched a major attack on Northern Liang, but Juqu Mengxun was able to hold Zhangye, forcing Tufa Rutan to withdraw. In fall 406, Juqu Mengxun made a surprise attack on Jiuquan, initially defeated Li Gao, but he could not successfully siege Jiuquan and was forced to withdraw.

In fall 407, Tufa Rutan made another attack on Northern Liang, but Juqu Mengxun was able to defeat him.

In 410, Tufa Rutan and his brother Tufa Juyan (禿髮俱延) launched successive attacks on Northern Liang, and Juqu Mengxun was not only able to repel them, but then proceeded to siege Guzang (where Tufa Rutan had moved his capital after receiving it as a bestowment from Yao Xing in 406). The people of Guzang, because Tufa Rutan had previously carried out massive executions after a failed rebellion, collapsed in fear, and more than 10,000 households surrendered to Northern Liang. Tufa Rutan, apprehensive of both Juqu Mengxun and a rebellion by Zhequ Qizhen (折屈奇鎮) in the south, made peace with Juqu Mengxun and moved his capital back south to Ledu (樂都, in modern Haidong Prefecture, Qinghai). As soon as he left Guzang, however, Hou Chen (侯諶) and Jiao Lang (焦朗) seized control of Guzang and nominally submitted to Juqu Mengxun, although they held Guzang themselves. In fall 410, Juqu Mengxun attacked Western Liang and defeated Li Gao's heir apparent Li Xin and captured the Western Liang general Zhu Yuanhu (朱元虎), and he subsequently made peace with Li Gao when Li Gao ransomed Zhu with silver and gold.

In spring 411, with Jiao Lang still holding Guzang, Juqu Mengxun sieged Guzang and captured him, but pardoned him. He left Juqu Ru in command at Guzang and then attacked Southern Liang, putting Ledu under siege, and only withdrew after Tufa Rutan sent his son Tufa Anzhou (禿髮安周) as a hostage. Tufa Rutan soon counterattacked, however, and initially was successful, but Juqu Mengxun trailed Tufa Rutan's forces and defeated him, again putting Ledu under siege and forcing Tufa Rutan to send another son, Tufa Ran'gan (禿髮染干) as a witness before withdrawing. In fall 411, Juqu Mengxun made a surprise attack on Western Liang, but was unsuccessful, and as he ran out of food supplies and withdrew, Li Gao sent Li Xin to attack him, defeating him.

In winter 412, Juqu Mengxun moved the capital from Zhangye to Guzang, and he claimed the greater title of Prince of Hexi.

== Middle reign ==
In 413, Juqu Mengxun created his son Juqu Zhengde (沮渠政德) heir apparent. In the summer of that year, he repelled another attack from Tufa Rutan, and then again put Ledu under siege for 20 days, but could not capture it. He renewed the attack when Tufa Rutan's general Tufa Wenzhi (禿髮文支) surrendered to him, forcing Tufa Rutan to send Tufa Juyan as a hostage to him.

Also in 413, while Juqu Mengxun was sleeping, his eunuch Wang Huaizu (王懷祖) tried to assassinate him, but only hurt his foot. Juqu Mengxun's wife Princess Meng arrested Wang and had him beheaded. Also in 413, Juqu Mengxun's mother Lady Che died.

With Western Qin having destroyed Southern Liang in 414, Northern Liang and Western Qin began to have a series of wars, with Juqu Mengxun largely winning these battles against Western Qin's prince Qifu Chipan. In 416, after an inconclusive battle, Northern Liang and Western Qin entered into peace.

In 417, Juqu Mengxun tried to lay a trap for Li Xin (who had succeeded Li Gao after Li Gao's death that year) by having his general Juqu Guangzong (沮渠廣宗) pretending to surrender to Western Liang, while Juqu Mengxun lay in wait. However, Li Xin realized the trap and withdrew, and as Juqu Mengxun gave chase, Li Xin defeated him.

That year, Juqu Mengxun became fearful and angry when he heard that the Jin general Liu Yu had destroyed Later Qin and seized its territory, probably in fear that Liu Yu would next advance against his state. When his official Liu Xiang (劉祥) was making a report to him with a smile, Juqu Mengxun angrily stated, "How do you dare to smile upon hearing that Liu Yu had entered Hangu Pass!" and beheaded Liu Xiang. (This is despite Juqu Mengxun having made an overture in 415 agreeing to submit to Jin as a vassal.) His fears appeared to subside after Liu Yu left former Later Qin territory late in 417, and dissipate completely when the Xia emperor Helian Bobo crushed troops under Liu Yu's son Liu Yizhen (劉義真) in 418.

In 418, Juqu Mengxun made an attack on Western Liang, but Li Xin refused to engage him, and he withdrew. Later that year, he submitted to Jin as a vassal.

In 420, Juqu Mengxun set another trap for Li Xin. He pretended to attack Western Qin's city Haomen (浩亹, in modern Haidong Prefecture, Qinghai), but once reaching Haomen, immediately withdrew and hid his army at Chuanyan (川巖, near Zhangye). Li Xin, believing wrongly that Juqu Mengxun's defenses were down, decided to attack Zhangye, against the advice of Song Yao and Zhang Tishun, as well as his mother Princess Dowager Yin. As he approached Zhangye, Juqu Mengxun intercepted him and defeated him. His generals then advised him to quickly withdraw to Jiuquan, but Li Xin, stating that he had disobeyed his mother and would only be able to see her again after a victory, engaged Juqu Mengxun again, suffering an even greater defeat, and he was killed in battle. Juqu Mengxun quickly captured Jiuquan and most of Western Liang territory. He largely maintained a policy of trying to pacify the Western Liang people and incorporating capable Western Liang officials into his administration, including Li Gao's half-brother Song Yao (宋繇). In winter 420, Li Xin's brother Li Xun seized Dunhuang and tried to reestablish Western Liang rule, and Juqu Mengxun initially sent Juqu Zhengde to siege Dunhuang. In spring 421, he attacked Dunhuang himself, and when Li Xun tried to surrender, he refused. Li Xun's official Song Cheng (宋承) rebelled and offered the city to him, and Li Xun committed suicide, ending Western Liang; contrary to the pacification policy he carried out at Jiuquan, Juqu Mengxun slaughtered the populace of Dunhuang.

With Western Liang destroyed, Juqu Mengxun renewed his attacks against Western Qin, and while his initial attacks were repelled, his attacks had a draining effect on Western Qin, whose strength began to be sapped. At some point, he also encouraged Tufa Rutan's crown prince Tufa Hutai (禿髮虎台) to rebel against Western Qin, promising to lend him two commanderies and troops, but after Tufa Hutai's plot, which also included his sister Princess Tufa (Qifu Chipan's wife), was discovered, Qifu Chipan had Tufa Hutai and Princess Tufa executed. Some members of the Tufa clan fled to Northern Liang.

In 421, the general Tang Qi (唐契), a former Western Liang general and brother-in-law to Li Xin, rebelled at his post of Jinchang (晉昌, in modern Jiuquan, Gansu), and not until 423 did Juqu Zhengde defeat Tang, but Tang and his brother Tang He (唐和) and nephew Li Bao (李寶, Li Xin's son) fled to Yiwu (伊吾, in modern Kumul Prefecture, Xinjiang) and held out there.

Also in 423, Juqu Mengxun sent tributes to Jin's successor state, Liu Song, which Liu Yu had established in 420. Liu Yu's son Emperor Shao of Liu Song affirmed Juqu Mengxun's title of Prince of Hexi. In fall of that year, when Rouran attacked Northern Liang, Juqu Mengxun sent Juqu Zhengde to fight Rouran, but Juqu Zhengde was defeated and killed. Juqu Mengxun then created his next son Juqu Xingguo (沮渠興國) as heir apparent.

In 426, a decisive battle would largely end Western Qin as a threat to Northern Liang. Qifu Chipan and his crown prince Qifu Mumo were launching a major attack on Northern Liang. Juqu Mengxun sent messengers to persuade the Xia emperor Helian Chang (Helian Bobo's son and successor) to make a surprise attack on the Western Qin capital Fuhan (枹罕, in modern Linxia, Gansu). Helian Chang, in response, sent his general Hulu Gu (呼盧古) to attack Wanchuan and Wei Fa (韋伐) to attack Nan'an (南安, in modern Dingxi, Gansu), and while Western Qin was able to hold Wanchuan, Nan'an fell, at great loss. In winter 426, Xia forces commanded by Hulu and Wei attack Fuhan, forcing Qifu Gangui to move the capital to Dinglian (定連, also in Linxia), and Hulu and Wei then captured another important Western Qin city, Xiping (西平, in modern Xining, Qinghai), and while they then withdrew, Western Qin had been dealt a major blow. Later that year, with Emperor Taiwu of Northern Wei having in turn defeated Helian Chang in battle, capturing Chang'an and nearly capturing the Xia capital Tongwan (統萬, in modern Yulin, Shaanxi) as well, Juqu Mengxun sent messengers to Northern Wei offering to submit as a vassal.

In 428, when Qifu Chipan died and was succeeded by Qifu Mumo, Juqu Mengxun made a major attack on Western Qin. Qifu Mumo sent back his general Juqu Chengdu (沮渠成都), whom Qifu Chipan captured in 422, to seek peace, and they entered into a peace agreement. However, just several months later, Juqu Mengxun renewed his attacks on Western Qin.

== Late reign ==
In 429, Juqu Mengxun launched another major attack on Western Qin, but during the campaign, Juqu Xingguo was captured, and Juqu Mengxun was forced to withdraw, after his forces, aligned also with Tuyuhun forces commanded by Murong Muliyan (慕容慕利延), the brother of the khan Murong Mugui (慕容慕璝). He soon sent a large amount of grain to Qifu Mumo, requesting to ransom Juqu Xingguo, but Qifu Mumo refused, so Juqu Mengxun created Juqu Xingguo's younger brother, by the same mother, Juqu Puti (沮渠菩提), to be heir apparent. Qifu Mumo kept Juqu Xingguo as an official and married a sister to him.

In 431, with Xia's emperor Helian Ding (Helian Chang's brother and successor after Helian Chang was captured by Northern Wei in 428) having first destroyed Western Qin and killed Qifu Mumo and then having been defeated and captured by Murong Mugui), Juqu Mengxun, now with his territory directly in contact with Northern Wei, sent his son Juqu Anzhou to Northern Wei as a hostage to show his loyalty. In response, Northern Wei's Emperor Taiwu sent his official Li Shun (李順) to Northern Liang to bestow a number of high titles, including the title of Prince of Liang.

By 432, Juqu Mengxun, in his old age, was said to be arbitrary and cruel, with his subjects suffering the pain henceforth. When Li Shun again arrived in his territory, he initially refused to bow down to receive the Northern Wei emperor's edict, but upon Li Shun's warning that such disrespect will be punished, did so. In 433, he grew ill, and his nobles and officials believed Juqu Puti to be too young to succeed him, and so deposed Juqu Puti and replaced him as heir apparent with his older brother Juqu Mujian. Juqu Mengxun soon died, and Juqu Mujian succeeded him.

== Family ==
Consorts and their respective issue(s):

- Empress Consort, of the Meng clan (皇后孟氏)
- Princess Xingping, of the Qifu clan (兴平公主), persinal name Yanji (燕姬), daughter of Qifu Chipan, King Wenzhao of Qin (秦文昭王(乞伏炽磐)
- Lady, of the Tufa clan (秃发氏)
- Unknown:
  - Juqu Zhengde, Crown Prince (沮渠政德, d.423), 1st son
  - Juqu Xingguo, Crown Prince (沮渠興國, d.431), 2nd son
  - Juqu Puti, Crown Prince (沮渠菩提), 3rd son
  - Juqu Mujian, Prince Ai (北涼哀王 沮渠牧犍, d. 447), 4th son
  - Juqu Wuhui, Prince of Hexi (河西王 沮渠無諱), 5th son
  - Juqu Anzhou, Prince of Hexi (河西王 沮渠安周, d.460), 6th son
  - Juqu Yide (沮渠儀德), 7th son
  - Juqu Bing (沮渠秉, d. 444), 8th son
  - Juqu Donglai (沮渠董來), 9th son
  - Princess Xingping (兴平公主)
    - Married Emperor Taiwu of Northern Wei
  - Another daughter, older than Juqu Mujian

Prince Wuxuan of (Northern) Liang House of Juqu Born: 368 Died: 433
Chinese royalty
New creation	Duke of Zhangye; 401–412	Succeeded by Himself as Prince of Hexi
Preceded by Himself as Duke of Zhangye	Prince of Hexi; 412–433	Succeeded by Juqu Mujian
Recreated Title last held by Duan Ye	Prince of Northern Liang; 431–433	Succeeded by Juqu Mujian
Titles in pretence
Preceded by Duan Ye	— TITULAR — Emperor of China; 401–433; Reason for succession failure: Sixteen Kingdoms	Succeeded by Juqu Mujian
Preceded by Tufa Rutan	— TITULAR — Emperor of China; 401–433; Reason for succession failure: Sixteen Kingdoms	Succeeded by Juqu Mujian
Preceded by Li Xin	— TITULAR — Emperor of China; 401–433; Reason for succession failure: Sixteen Kingdoms	Succeeded by Juqu Mujian
Preceded by Li Xun	— TITULAR — Emperor of China; 401–433; Reason for succession failure: Sixteen Kingdoms	Succeeded by Juqu Mujian
