= Yao Xing =

Emperor Wenhuan of Later Qin 後秦文桓帝
- Emperor of Later Qin
- Ming dynasty depiction of Yao Xing (seated) from the Yongle Encyclopedia

Emperor of Later Qin
- Reign: 394–416
- Predecessor: Yao Chang
- Successor: Yao Hong
- Born: 366
- Died: 416 (aged 49–50)
- Burial: Ou Mausoleum (偶陵)
- Spouse: Empress Zhang; Empress Qi
- Issue: Yao Hong; Consort Yao
Names
- Yao Xing (姚興)
Era dates
- Huáng chū (皇初): 394–399; Hóng shǐ (弘始): 399–416
Posthumous name
- Emperor Wenhuan (文桓皇帝, lit. "civil and diligent")
Temple name
- Gaozu (高祖)
- House: Yao
- Dynasty: Later Qin
- Father: Yao Chang

Yao Xing (Chinese: 姚興; 366–416), courtesy name Zilüe (子略), also known by his posthumous name as the Emperor Wenhuan of Later Qin (後秦文桓帝), was an emperor of the Qiang-led Chinese Later Qin dynasty. He was the son of the founding emperor Yao Chang (Emperor Wuzhao). For most of his reign, he did not use the title of emperor, but used the title Heavenly King (Tian Wang). During his reign, he destroyed the rival Former Qin and proceeded to expand his hegemony over nearly all of western China, as he temporarily seized all of Western Qin's territory and forced Southern Liang, Northern Liang, Western Liáng, and Qiao Zong's Western Shu (西蜀) all to at least nominally submit to him. However, late in his reign, defeats on the battlefield, particularly at the hands of the rebel general Helian Bobo (who founded the Helian Xia), and internecine struggles between his sons and nephews greatly damaged the Later Qin state, and it was destroyed soon after his death.

A passionate follower of Buddhism, Yao Xing heavily promoted the religion among his subjects. He was a prominent figure in the spread of the religion in China, as he sponsored the monk, Kumārajīva to translate many Buddhist texts from Sanskrit to Chinese.

== Before and during Yao Chang's reign ==
Yao Xing was born in 366, when his father Yao Chang was a general under the Former Qin emperor Fu Jiān. Who his mother was is open to interpretation; Yao Chang's wife, the later Empress She, was mentioned as his mother, but when Yao Xing later became emperor, he posthumously honored one of Yao Chang's concubines, Consort Sun, as empress dowager, which allows an inference that he could have been born of Consort Sun but raised by Empress She, but there is no conclusive evidence. Not much is known about his life under Former Qin rule, other than that when he grew older, he served as an assistant to Fu Jiān's crown prince Fu Hong (苻宏).

When Yao Chang declared a rebellion and established Later Qin in 384, Yao Xing was at the Former Qin capital Chang'an, and he immediately fled to his father. For the next several years, as Yao Chang fought with Former Qin and Western Yan, Yao Xing was often entrusted with guarding the base of operations (initially Beidi (北地, in modern Tongchuan, Shaanxi), later Chang'an after Western Yan captured and then abandoned it), while his father engaged in campaigns. In 386, after Yao Chang declared himself emperor, he created Yao Xing crown prince. He was considered to be firm and gracious, and he spent much time studying literature despite the work necessary in maintaining home base. In 392, while Yao Chang was away on a campaign, Yao Xing, at the suggestion of the general Yao Fangcheng (姚方成), executed a number of Former Qin generals whom Yao Chang had taken captive earlier. While Yao Chang was angry on the surface, he appeared to be secretly happy that Yao Xing realized the danger that these generals posed. In 393, when the Former Qin emperor Fu Deng attacked the Later Qin vassal Dou Chong, Yao Chang, at the suggestion of the prime minister Yin Wei, sent Yao Xing against Fu Deng, in order to establish Yao Xing's authority over the troops. Yao Xing was able to stop Fu Deng's attack on Dou fairly easily.

Around the new year 393, Yao Chang fell seriously ill. He told Yao Xing, on his death bed, to trust the several officials that he entrusted his administration with—Yin, Yao Huang (姚晃), Yao Damu (姚大目), and Di Bozhi (狄伯支). When Yao Huang asked Yao Chang for strategies to defeat Fu Deng, Yao Chang refused to answer, merely stating that he trusted that Yao Xing would be able to accomplish it. He soon died, and Yao Xing succeeded him, although initially not keeping Yao Chang's death a secret and entrusting the troops to his uncles Yao Xu (姚緒) and Yao Shuode (姚碩德) and his brother Yao Chóng (姚崇), while preparing a campaign against Former Qin.

== Early reign: establishment of Later Qin as regional power ==
Despite Yao Xing's hopes of keeping his father's death a secret, Fu Deng received news of it anyway—and immediately prepared a major attack against Later Qin. Fu Deng had his brother Fu Guang (苻廣) defend the base of Yongcheng (雍城, in modern Baoji, Shaanxi) and Fu Chong defend the base of Hu Kong Castle (胡空堡, in modern Xianyang, Shaanxi), and, in his anxiety, did not make sure that his army had sufficient water supply. Yao Xing set up his army at Mawei (馬嵬, in modern Xianyang, Shaanxi) to prevent Former Qin forces from reaching the river near Mawei, and Former Qin forces were stricken by thirst, but still fought harder. Yao Xing initially ordered Yin to be cautious, but Yin, realizing the trouble the Former Qin forces were already in and believing that morale would be destroyed if he undertook a cautious strategy, fought back fervently, and the Former Qin forces collapsed. Upon hearing the defeat, Fu Deng's brother Fu Guang (苻廣) and son Fu Chong abandoned the two bases that they were holding, and Fu Deng was unable to recapture them. He then sought help from the King of Western Qin, Qifu Gangui, who sent a relief force headed by Qifu Yizhou (乞伏益州). As Fu Deng sought to join up with Qifu Yizhou, Yao Xing ambushed and captured him, and then executed him. He disbanded Fu Deng's troops and gave Fu Deng's Empress Li to Yao Huang. Fu Deng's crown prince Fu Chong would assume imperial title and attempt to resist Later Qin a few months longer, but later in the year died in battle against Western Qin after Qifu Gangui turned against him, ending Former Qin. Later Qin assumed nearly all of Former Qin's remaining territory. Around the new year 395, Later Qin established peace with Later Yan, thus obviating likelihood of war on the eastern border—although later in 395, when Later Yan's crown prince Murong Bao carried out a disastrous campaign against Northern Wei's King Tuoba Gui, Later Qin sent a relief force to aid Northern Wei, although Later Qin forces did not actually engage Later Yan. Further, in 397, with Later Yan under heavy attack by Northern Wei after its founding emperor Murong Chui died and was replaced by Murong Bao, Later Qin refused to provide aid to Later Yan.

Later in 397, Empress Dowager She died. Yao Xing was described to be in such great mourning that he was unable to handle matters of state for some time. After that had passed, however, he continued to wear mourning clothes.

Overall, during this period, Yao Xing was described by historians as diligent and willing to listen to different opinions, ruling the empire efficiently. He engaged in a number of campaigns on the various borders, enlarging Later Qin's territories and influence.

In 399, Yao Xing sent his brother Yao Chóng the Duke of Qi and the general Yang Fosong (楊佛嵩) to attack the important Jin city of Luoyang, and in winter 399 captured Luoyang and the surrounding cities.

Also in 399, Yao Xing, in response to astrological signs that were considered signs of disaster, stopped claiming the title of emperor, instead using the title "Heavenly King" (Tian Wang), to show humility to the gods. He also accordingly demoted his officials and noble by one rank.

In 400, Yao Xing sent his uncle Yao Shuode the Duke of Longxi to launch a major attack against Western Qin. Despite Western Qin's initial success in cutting off Yao Shuode's supply line, Yao Xing himself led a force to aid Yao Shuode, defeating Western Qin's king Qifu Gangui in battle, nearly capturing Qifu Gangui's entire army and proceeding to take most of Western Qin's cities. Qifu Gangui himself surrendered to Southern Liang's king Tufa Lilugu, thus temporarily ending Western Qin's existence. In fall 400, believing that he was being suspected by Tufa Lilugu, Qifu Gangui fled from Southern Liang and surrendered to Later Qin. Yao Xing created him the Marquess of Guiyi and, in 401, took the unusual action of giving Qifu Gangui his army back and ordering him to defend his old capital Wanchuan (苑川, in modern Baiyin, Gansu), and while Qifu Gangui was in name a Later Qin general, he acted independently at times.

Later in 401, Yao Xing, under suggestion from Yao Shuode, launched a major attack against Later Liang. To avoid conflict, Tufa Lilugu ordered Southern Liang forces to yield a path for Later Qin forces, and Yao Shuode therefore easily reached the Later Liang capital Guzang (姑臧, in modern Wuwei, Gansu), putting the city under siege. Southern Liang, Northern Liang, and Western Liang all sent messengers submitting as vassals. After two months of siege, Later Liang's emperor Lü Long also submitted as a vassal, and was given the title Duke of Jiankang, although he remained in control of Guzang and continued to use the Heavenly King title internally as well. Northern Liang's duke Juqu Mengxun became so apprehensive that he offered to yield his territory and relocate his entire army into Later Qin proper, but later reneged on the promise, although he remained Later Qin vassal for years. (Despite their status as Later Qin vassals, however, the various Liang states continued to battle against each other.)

== Middle reign: entrenchment and stagnation ==
Around the new year 402, Northern Wei attacked the Later Qin vassal Moyigan, and this led to the breakdown of relations between Northern Wei and Later Qin. When Northern Wei's Emperor Daowu (Tuoba Gui) sought marriage with Later Qin, Yao Xing, because of this and because he heard that Emperor Daowu already had Empress Murong as his wife, refused. In summer 402, Yao Xing personally led a major attack against Northern Wei, which had by this point taken over nearly all of Later Yan's territory north of the Yellow River. In the fall of 402, Yao Xing's forward commander Yao Ping (姚平) the Duke of Yiyang was surrounded by Northern Wei's Emperor Daowu at Chaibi (柴壁, in modern Linfen, Shanxi), and despite counterattacks by both Yao Ping and Yao Xing, the Northern Wei siege became increasingly tighter, and in winter 402, Yao Ping and his army were captured following a failed attempt to break out, ending Yao Xing's campaign against Northern Wei.

Also in 402, Yao Xing created his concubine Consort Zhang empress. He also created his son Yao Hong as crown prince and other sons as dukes. Yao Xing had long wanted to create Yao Hong, described as kind, loving, and studious, as crown prince, but hesitated because Yao Hong was also regarded as having a weak personality and prone to illnesses.

Around this time, Yao Xing also appeared to have become a devout Buddhist, under the influence of the monk Kumarajiva. This appeared to have a major influence on his actions later on—as he appeared to avoid decisive actions that may lead to many deaths, while trying to act gently toward his enemies. This had an unfortunately deleterious effect on his empire, which, for the most part, stopped expanding. In 405, he gave Kumaraijiva an honorific title, treating him like a god, and often led his officials in listening to Kumaraijiva's sermons. At his request, Kumarajiva translated more than 300 sutras into Chinese. Yao Xing also built many towers and temples. Because of his influence, it was described that 90% of the population became Buddhists.

In 403, with his Later Liang state continuously under attack by Northern Liang and Southern Liang, Lü Long surrendered the Guzang region—the only territory still remaining under Later Liang control—to Later Qin, thus ending Later Liang. Yao Xing moved Lü Long and his clan to Chang'an and made him and his brother Lü Chao (呂超) officials. However, because Northern Liang and Southern Liang were only nominal vassals, Guzang was effectively a lone island of Later Qin control. In 404, Southern Liang's king Tufa Rutan (Tufa Lilugu's brother) stopped claiming kingly title and using his own era name, in a further showing of submission to Later Qin, although internally he remained effectively independent.

In 405, at the request of the Jin general Liu Yu, Yao Xing returned 12 commanderies that had switched their allegiance from Jin to Later Qin during the Jin civil war from 398 to 405, despite his officials' opposition. (This gesture, however, would not be reciprocated by Liu, who would destroy Later Qin after Yao Xing's death.)

In 406, in response to Tufa Rutan's tribute of 3,000 horses and 30,000 sheep, Yao Xing became so touched that he yielded Guzang to Tufa Rutan, thus ending Later Qin's actual control of the Guzang region.

In 407, believing that Qifu Gangui was becoming difficult to control, when Qifu Gangui arrived in Chang'an for an official visit, he detained Qifu Gangui to be a civilian official, while giving command of Qifu Gangui's army to Qifu Gangui's heir apparent, Qifu Chipan.

Later in 407, Later Qin and Northern Wei agreed to peace—returning previously captured generals to each other. The Later Qin general Liu Bobo (who would later change his name to Helian Bobo), who was then in charge of Shuofang (朔方, in modern Ordos, Inner Mongolia), because his father Liu Weichen had been killed by Northern Wei forces in 391, became angry and declared a rebellion, establishing Xia. Liu Bobo used guerrilla tactics against Later Qin, wearing Later Qin's armies and cities down. From this point on, Later Qin began to decline.

== Late reign: gradual weakening of Later Qin ==
In 407, Murong Chao, the emperor of Southern Yan, whose mother and wife were then in Later Qin, requested to have them delivered to Southern Yan. Yao Xing agreed to do so if Murong Chao would agree to be a vassal and either deliver Former Qin palatial musicians (who were taken by Western Yan and eventually passed through Later Yan and then Southern Yan) or 1,000 Jin citizens to Later Qin, before his request would be agreed. Murong Chao agreed to yield as vassal, and delivered the musicians to Later Qin. Yao Xing then delivered his mother and wife to him, along with gifts.

Also in 407, Qiao Zong, who had taken control of Jin's Yi Province (modern Chongqing and Sichuan) and declared himself the King of Chengdu, became a Later Qin vassal.

In 408, noticing that Southern Liang was under severe attack by its neighbors (including having suffered a terrible defeat to Xia in 407), Yao Xing launched a campaign to try to destroy Southern Liang, despite opposition by his official Wei Zong (韋宗), who felt that Tufa Rutan would not be defeated easily. He commissioned his son Yao Bi (姚弼) the Duke of Guangping along with Qifu Gangui and Lian Cheng (斂成) to attack Southern Liang, while simultaneously commission Qi Nan (齊難) to attack Xia. Both ventures ended badly. Yao Bi and later Yao Xian (姚顯) the Duke of Changshan were defeated by Tufa Rutan, and Yao Xing was forced to agree to a new peace with Southern Liang while having lost prestige based on the defeat. Even more disastrous was the Qi's mission, however, as Qi fell into a trap laid by Liu Bobo and was captured with his entire army, causing all of modern northern Shaanxi to fall into Xia hands. Later in 408, Tufa Rutan effectively repudiated his vassal status by again claiming the title King of Liang (instead of the Later Qin-created title of Duke of Guangwu) and changing era name.

Around this time, there also began to be increasing tendencies by Yao Xing's brothers and sons to plot to take over power. For example, in 409, his brother Yao Chōng (姚沖, note different tone than another brother) tried to force Di Bozhi to join him in a plot to attack Chang'an, and when Di refused, poisoned Di to death, but was discovered later and forced to commit suicide.

Also in 409, Qifu Gangui escaped and returned to Wanchuan to join his son Qifu Chipan. He soon redeclared independence and reestablished Western Qin as its king. He soon launched several campaigns against Later Qin and inflicted substantial damage, although he would apologize in 411 and again declared himself a Later Qin vassal. Later that year, however, he resumed his attacks.

Later in 409, the Jin general Liu Yu launched a major attack on Southern Yan, which sought aid from Later Qin. Initially, Yao Xing sent messengers to try to persuade Liu Yu to withdraw, and also sent a relief force commanded by Yao Qiang (姚強), but was forced to withdraw Yao Qiang's force when he suffered a major loss at Liu Bobo's hands and was nearly captured. Without aid from Later Qin, Southern Yan fell to Jin in early 410.

Later in 410, at Qiao Zong's request, Yao Xing sent an army commanded by Gou Lin (苟林) to join Qiao Zong's army, commanded by Huan Qian (桓謙) and Qiao Daofu (譙道福) to attack Jin's Jing Province (荊州, modern Hunan and central Hubei). However, Liu Yu's brother Liu Daogui (劉道規) defeated both armies, killing Huan Qian and forcing Gou to flee.

As of 411, Yao Bi, who was greatly favored by Yao Xing, was deep into a conspiracy to try to undermine the crown prince Yao Hong.

In 412, Qifu Gangui was assassinated by his nephew Qifu Gongfu (乞伏公府), the son of the founding king Qifu Guoren. Many Later Qin officials try to persuade Yao Xing to take the opportunity, as Qifu Gongfu and Qifu Chipan battled for control of the state, to attack Western Qin. Yao Xing refused, believing it improper to attack a state that was still mourning.

Also in 412, Yao Xing created his concubine Consort Qi empress. (No historical record gave the date when Yao Xing's first empress Empress Zhang died, but presumably she had by this point.)

In 413, Liu Yu's general Zhu Lingshi attacked Qiao Zong's Western Shu state and destroyed it, reannexing it to Jin. Yao Xing, although Western Shu's suzerain, was unable to aid it.

In 414, Yao Bi made several attempts to be made crown prince by having officials close to him suggesting Yao Xing to replace Yao Hong with him. Yao Xing refused, but did not rebuke Yao Bi. Yao Xing grew seriously ill that year, and Yao Bi planned a coup to take over. His brother Yao Yu revealed his plot to the other brothers Yao Yi, Yao Huang, Yao Chen, and Yao Xuan, who mobilized their own forces to be ready to attack Yao Bi if necessary. Yao Xing was forced to relieve Yao Bi of his posts, and the other sons demobilized and arrived at Chang'an for an official visit. The sons accused Yao Bi of many crimes, but Yao Xing took no further action. Indeed, in 415, Yao Bi retaliated by falsely accusing Yao Xuan of crimes, and Yao Xing arrested Yao Xuan.

In summer 415, the Jin general Sima Xiuzhi (司馬休之), having been forced to escape after Liu Yu attacked him, fled to Later Qin. Yao Xing commissioned Sima Xiuzhi with an army to let him harass Jin borders, despite warnings by his officials of a prophecy that the Simas would regain Guanzhong and the Luoyang region.

In fall 415, Yao Xing fell ill again, and Yao Bi secretly gathered forces again to plan a coup. Yao Xing found out and arrested Yao Bi, but at Yao Hong's urging did not execute him but instead released him.

In winter 415, Yao Xing sent his daughter, the Princess Xiping, to Northern Wei to be married to Emperor Daowu's son Emperor Mingyuan, in order to affirm the alliance between the two states. Emperor Mingyuan welcomed her with the ceremony due an empress. However, Princess Xiping was unable to forge a golden statue, as required by Tuoba Tribe traditions to be a sign of divine favor, to become an empress, so she was only created an imperial consort, but she was treated with the honors due an empress.

In 416, Yao Xing went on a trip to Huayin (華陰), near Chang'an, and fell ill on the trip and headed back to Chang'an. His attendant Yin Chong (尹沖) -- one of Yao Bi's supporters—planned to then assassinate Yao Hong as Yao Hong would come out of the city to welcome Yao Xing. Yao Hong's supporters received news of this and persuaded Yao Hong not to come out to welcome Yao Xing. Yin's assistant Yao Shami (姚沙彌) then tried to persuade Yin to take Yao Xing and join with Yao Bi to seize power, but Yin hesitated and did not do so. Once Yao Xing returned to the Chang'an palace, he transferred power to Yao Hong and ordered Yao Bi arrested. Meanwhile, Yao Xing's son Yao Geng'er (姚耕兒), believing that Yao Xing had died, persuaded his brother Yao Yin (姚愔) the Duke of Nanyang to start a coup, and Yao Yin joined with Yin Chong (perhaps in anticipatory support of Yao Bi's claims) to attack the palace, battling with Yao Hong's troops. Yao Xing, despite his illness, made an appearance and announced an edict ordering Yao Bi to commit suicide. As soon as Yao Yin's troops saw Yao Xing, they abandoned Yao Yin. That night, Yao Xing entrusted Yao Hong's administration to his brother Yao Shao (姚紹) the Duke of Dongping, Liang Xi (梁喜), Yin Zhao (尹昭), and Lian Manwei (斂曼嵬), and he died the next day. Yao Hong succeeded him, but he soon had to face even more challenges from his brothers and cousins as well as attacks by Xia and Jin, and by 417 Later Qin had fallen to Jin.

== Personal information ==
- Father
  - Yao Chang (Emperor Wucheng)
- Mother
  - Empress She (but might be Consort Sun)
- Wives
  - Empress Zhang (created 402)
  - Empress Qi (created 412)
- Children
  - Yao Hong (姚泓), the Crown Prince (created 402), later emperor
  - Yao Yi (姚懿), the Duke of Taiyuan (created 402)
  - Yao Bi (姚弼), the Duke of Guangping (created 402, forced to commit suicide 416)
  - Yao Huang (姚洸), the Duke of Chenliu (created 402)
  - Yao Xuan (姚宣), Duke (created 402, executed by Yao Shao 416)
  - Yao Chen (姚諶), Duke (created 402)
  - Yao Yin (姚愔), the Duke of Nanyang (created 402, executed by Yao Hong 416)
  - Yao Pu (姚璞), the Duke of Pingyuan (created 402, executed by Liu Yu 417)
  - Yao Zhi (姚質), Duke (created 402)
  - Yao Kui (姚逵), Duke (created 402)
  - Yao Yu (姚裕), Duke (created 402)
  - Yao Guoer (姚國兒), Duke (created 402)
  - Yao Geng'er (姚耕兒)
  - Yao Huangmei (姚黃眉), Duke of Longxi of Northern Wei
  - Princess Xiping, concubine of Emperor Mingyuan of Northern Wei

Emperor Wenhuan of (Later) Qin House of Yao Born: 366 Died: 416
Regnal titles
Preceded by Yao Chang	Emperor of Later Qin; 394–416	Succeeded by Yao Hong
Titles in pretence
Preceded by Yao Chang	— TITULAR — Emperor of China; 394–416; Reason for succession failure: Sixteen Kingdoms	Succeeded by Yao Hong
Preceded by Fu Deng	— TITULAR — Emperor of China; 394–416; Reason for succession failure: Sixteen Kingdoms	Succeeded by Yao Hong
Preceded by Emperor An of Jin	— TITULAR — Emperor of China; 394–416; Reason for succession failure: Sixteen Kingdoms	Succeeded by Helian Bobo
Preceded by Lü Long	— TITULAR — Emperor of China; 394–416; Reason for succession failure: Sixteen Kingdoms	Succeeded by Tufa Rutan
Preceded by Qifu Gangui	— TITULAR — Emperor of China; 394–416; Reason for succession failure: Sixteen Kingdoms	Succeeded by Qifu Gangui
