= Jiaping =

Jiaping (嘉平) may refer to:

- Jiaping Town, a town in Jiangjin District, Chongqing, China

== Historical eras ==
- Jiaping (249–254), era name used by Cao Fang, emperor of Cao Wei
- Jiaping (311–315), era name used by Liu Cong (Han-Zhao), emperor of Han-Zhao
- Jiaping (408–414), era name used by Tufa Rutan, ruler of Southern Liang
