= Queen Zhejue =

Chinese queen (fifth century AD)

Queen Zhejue (Chinese: 折掘王后; personal name unknown) was the only historically known queen of the Xianbei-led Chinese Southern Liang dynasty. Her husband was the state's final ruler, Tufa Rutan (Prince Jing).

Very little is known about Queen Zhejue, who was likely from the nearby Zhejue tribe, also of Xianbei extraction. She bore Tufa Rutan at least one son, the crown prince Tufa Hutai (禿髮虎台). It is unclear when she died, and it remains uncertain whether she survived the state's destruction in 414, as well as the death of her husband and son in 415 and 423, respectively, at the hands of Western Qin's king Qifu Chipan.

Chinese royalty
Preceded by Princess Shi of Later Liang	Queen of China (Southern Gansu/Eastern Qinghai); 408–414?	Succeeded by Queen Tufa of Western Qin
Preceded by Empress Zhang of Later Qin	Queen of China (Central Gansu); 408–410?	Succeeded by Princess Meng of Northern Liang
