= Princess Meng =

Chinese princess

Princess Meng (Chinese: 孟王后) was a princess of the Lushuihu-led Chinese Northern Liang dynasty. Her husband was Juqu Mengxun (Prince Wuxuan).

Very little is known about Princess Meng. She was mentioned as Juqu Mengxun's wife in 413, when she thwarted an assassination attempt against him by the eunuch Wang Huaizu (王懷祖) and captured Wang. She was probably the mother of his first two heirs apparent Juqu Xingguo (沮渠興國) and Juqu Puti (沮渠菩提), although this is not completely clear. It appears unlikely that she was the mother of his actual successor Juqu Mujian.

During Juqu Mujian's reign, a princess dowager was mentioned, without any names, and it could have been Princess Meng or Juqu Mujian's birth mother. If it was Princess Meng, then she died in the Northern Wei capital Pingcheng (平城, in modern Datong, Shanxi) after Juqu Mujian's capital Guzang (姑臧, in modern Wuwei, Gansu) had fallen to Northern Wei forces and he had been taken captive, but she was still buried with honors due a princess.

Chinese royalty
| Preceded by None (dynasty founded) | Princess of Northern Liang; 401–433 | Succeeded by Princess Li Jingshou |
| Preceded by Princess Shi of Later Liang | Princess of China (Northern Gansu); 401–433 | Succeeded by Princess Li Jingshou |
| Preceded by Princess Shi of Later Liang | Princess of China (Western Gansu/Eastern Xinjiang); 421–433 | Succeeded by Princess Li Jingshou |
| Preceded by Princess Zhejue of Southern Liang | Princess of China (Central Gansu); 411–433 | Succeeded by Princess Li Jingshou |
