= Wugu =

Wugu may refer to

- Wugu District, a district of New Taipei, Republic of China (Taiwan)
- Five Cereals (China), a set phrase meant to indicate important farmed crops in China since the beginning of its agricultural history, though particular categories and species within this group vary
- Tufa Wugu, founding prince of the Chinese/Xianbei state Southern Liang
- Wugu, an ancient tribal people in Inner Asia whose descendants were the Khongirads
