= Empress Zhang (Later Qin) =

Empress of the Qin dynasty

Empress Zhang (張皇后, personal name unknown) was an empress of the Qiang-led Later Qin dynasty of China. Her husband was Yao Xing (Emperor Wenhuan).

There is a scroll in the San Diego Museum of Art's collection, named "Ordination Scroll of Empress Zhang" which narrates the imperial ordination of Empress Zhang.

Very little is known about Empress Zhang. She was promoted to empress from the imperial consort title Zhaoyi (昭儀) in 402. No further reference was made to her in history, including when she died or whether she had any children.

Chinese royalty
| Preceded by Empress She | Empress of Later Qin; 402–? | Succeeded by Empress Qi |
| Preceded by Empress She | Empress of China (Northern Shaanxi); 402–? | Succeeded by Empress Qi |
| Preceded by Empress She | Empress of China (Central Shaanxi); 402–? | Succeeded by Empress Qi |
| Preceded by Empress Li of Former Qin | Empress of China (Eastern Gansu); 402–? | Succeeded by Empress Qi |
| Preceded by Empress Wang Shen'ai of Jin | Empress of China (Henan); 402–? | Succeeded by Empress Qi |
| Preceded by Queen Bian of Western Qin | Empress of China (Southwestern Gansu/Southeastern Qinghai); 402–? | Succeeded by Queen Bian of Western Qin |
| Preceded by Empress Yang of Later Liang | Empress of China (Central Gansu); 403–? | Succeeded by Princess Zhejue of Southern Liang |
