= Duan Ye =

Duan Ye 段業
- Prince of Liang

Ruler of Northern Liang
- Reign: 397–401
- Successor: Juqu Mengxun
- Died: 401
Full name
- Family name: Duàn (段); Given name: Yè (業)
Era dates
- Shénxǐ (神璽): 397–399; Tiānxǐ (天璽): 399–401
Regnal name
- 397–399: Grand Commander, Grand General of Prancing Dragon, Governor of Liang Province, Duke of Jiankang (大都督 龍驤大將軍 涼州牧 建康公) since 399: Prince of Liang (涼王)
- House: Duan
- Dynasty: Northern Liang

Duan Ye (simplified Chinese: 段业; traditional Chinese: 段業; pinyin: Duàn Yè; died 401) was the founding prince of China's Northern Liang dynasty. He was of Han ethnicity. After establishing the Northern Liang in 397, he was overthrown by Juqu Mengxun in 401.

Originally a commandery governor of the Later Liang dynasty, Duan Ye was persuaded by Juqu Nancheng (沮渠男成) to accept the leadership role of the Lushuihu generals who had rebelled against the Later Liang. During his reign, the Juqus were powerful, and in 401, Duan Ye was tricked by Juqu Mengxun into executing Juqu Nancheng. Juqu Mengxun then used this as the excuse to start a coup against Duan Ye, killing him and replacing him as king. Duan Ye was described as a kind but weak ruler who was unable to keep his subjects in check, and who overly trusted witchcraft and magic.

== Before reign ==
Not much is known about Duan Ye's life before 397. He was from Jingzhao Commandery (京兆, roughly modern Xi'an, Shaanxi), and was probably a low-level official that Former Qin sent to Liang Province (涼州, modern central and western Gansu) after conquering Former Liang in 376. His wife and children remained in Jingzhao.

The first historical reference to Duan Ye was in 388, when he was one of the officials under the ruler of Later Liang, Lü Guang, then carrying the title the Duke of Jiuquan. At a feast, Lü Guang and his officials were discussing his administration, when Duan Ye told Lü Guang that he was being overly harsh in his application of laws. Lü Guang, citing the examples of the legalists Wu Qi and Shang Yang, defended his harsh applications. Instead of backing down, Duan Ye pointed out that Wu and Shang both died as a result of their use of laws, and that what Lü Guang was doing was not in accordance of the wishes of the people. Lü Guang solemnly apologized. (However, what this conversation revealed about Duan Ye's own personal philosophy on governance may demonstrate the reasons why he was later ineffective as a ruler.)

In 396, when Lü Guang claimed the greater title of Prince of Sanhe, he made Duan Ye one of his ministers.

In 397, by which time Lü Guang, then with imperial title, was facing a rebellion from Juqu Mengxun and Juqu Nancheng after listening to false accusations and executing their uncles Juqu Luochou (沮渠羅仇) and Juqu Quzhou (沮渠麴粥), Duan Ye was the governor of Jiankang Commandery (建康, in modern Zhangye, Gansu). Juqu Nancheng put Jiankang under siege, but sent messengers to try to persuade Duan Ye that the Later Liang regime was becoming so corrupt as to be nearing destruction, and that with Duan's talents, he should be a leader. Duan Ye initially refused, but after 20 days of siege, no aid came from the Later Liang capital Guzang (姑臧, in modern Wuwei, Gansu). Duan Ye's advisors suggested that he accept Juqu Nancheng's proposal, and Duan Ye, who was also apprehensive of Lü Guang's officials Fang Gui (房晷) and Wang Xiang (王詳), with whom he had inimical relationships, agreed. He took the title the Duke of Jiankang and changed era name, signifying a declaration of independence from Later Liang and the establishment of Northern Liang. He entrusted most important affairs of state to Juqu Nancheng.

== Reign ==
Lü Guang's son Lü Zuan soon arrived and attacked Jiankang, but could not capture it. Soon thereafter, with the sorcerer Guo Nen (郭黁) having rebelled at Guzang, Lü Zuan withdrew from Jiankang, allowing Duan Ye's nascent state to stand.

In 398, Duan Ye sent Juqu Mengxun to attack Xi Commandery (西郡), in modern Zhangye, Gansu), and Juqu Mengxun captured it and its governor, Lü Guang's nephew Lü Chun (呂純). Soon thereafter, Jiuquan (酒泉, roughly modern Jiuquan, Gansu) and Dunhuang (敦煌, roughly modern Dunhuang, Gansu) Commanderies submitted as well, allowing Northern Liang to take over a large portion of formerly Later Liang territory. Lü Guang's son Lü Hong (呂弘) then also withdrew from Zhangye (張掖, in modern Zhangye), and Duan Ye moved his capital from Jiankang to Zhangye to further pressure Later Liang. He trailed Lü Hong to try to attack him, against Juqu Mengxun's advice not to cut off Lü Hong's escape, and was defeated by Lü Hong, saved from destruction only by Juqu Mengxun.

In 399, Duan Ye claimed the title of Prince of Liang. He made Juqu Mengxun and Liang Zhongyong (梁中庸) key ministers.

In summer 399, Lü Zuan and Lü Guang's heir apparent Lü Shao jointly attacked Northern Liang. Duan Ye sought aid from Southern Liang's prince Tufa Wugu, and Tufa Wugu sent his brother Tufa Lilugu and the general Yang Gui (楊軌) to assist him. Duan Ye, because of the Southern Liang aid, was set to make a counterattack against Later Liang forces, but Juqu Mengxun persuaded him that doing so would give Southern Liang an opening to make a surprise attack, and so Duan Ye merely defended, and Lü Shao and Lü Zuan were forced to withdraw.

In summer 400, Lü Zuan, who had by that point become Later Liang's emperor, made a major attack against Northern Liang, putting Zhangye under siege. However, Southern Liang's general Tufa Rutan then made a major attack on Guzang, forcing Lü Zuan to withdraw.

Also in 400, Duan would lose a major part of his territory. When his governor of Dunhuang Commandery, Meng Min (孟敏) died that year, the officials in Dunhuang Commandery supported Li Gao, a county magistrate, as his successor. Duan Ye initially agreed, but was then warned by his general Suo Si (索嗣) that Li Gao had greater ambitions and should not be permitted to stay at Dunhuang. Duan Ye therefore sent Suo to be the governor of Dunhuang. Li Gao made a surprise attack against Suo and defeated him, and then demanded that Suo be executed. At the advice of Juqu Nancheng (who also disliked Suo), Duan Ye executed Suo and apologized to Li Gao, who briefly remained submissive. However, late in 400, Li Gao, along with Tang Yao (唐瑤), seceded with six commanderies, establishing Western Liáng, and Li Gao soon took over modern western Gansu and eastern Xinjiang.

In 401, Duan Ye, apprehensive of Juqu Mengxun's military abilities, demoted him and replaced him with Ma Quan (馬權), but soon believed Juqu Mengxun's false accusations against Ma and executed him. Juqu Mengxun then proposed to Juqu Nancheng that Duan Ye be killed and replaced with Juqu Nancheng—citing Duan Ye's lack of judgment and ability to govern and that with Suo and Ma dead, there would be no one to oppose them if they made a move against Duan Ye. Juqu Nancheng refused, stating that such an action would be unjust.

Juqu Mengxun then set a trap for both Juqu Nancheng and Duan Ye. He set a date with Juqu Nancheng to offer sacrifices to the god of Lanmen Mountain (蘭門山, near Zhangye) on a vacation day, but submitting a false report through the official Xu Xian (許咸) that Juqu Nancheng was set to rebel and would start the rebellion on a day that he requested permission to sacrifice to the god of Lanmen Mountain. When Juqu Nancheng requested Duan Ye for such permission, Duan Ye arrested him and ordered him to commit suicide. Juqu Nancheng, who had realized Juqu Mengxun's plan by this point, told Duan Ye that this was a sign that Juqu Mengxun was about to rebel and that he should keep Juqu Nancheng alive, and then when Juqu Mengxun rebels he could counterattack. Duan Ye, not believing in Juqu Nancheng, executed him. Juqu Mengxun then cited Duan Ye's execution of Juqu Nancheng to ask his people to rise against Duan Ye, and the people indeed rose in rebellion, because of the high regard they had for Juqu Nancheng.

In a last-ditch effort, Duan Ye released the general Tian Ang (田昻), whom he had suspected of treachery earlier and imprisoned, and put Tian in charge of an army against Juqu Mengxun, along with Liang Zhongyong. Tian, however, quickly surrendered to Juqu Mengxun, and Duan Ye's remaining troops collapsed. Zhangye fell, and despite Duan Ye's pleas, Juqu Mengxun executed him and took over the throne.

Prince of (Northern) Liang House of Duan Died: 401
Chinese royalty
Recreated Last known title holder: Zhang Tingjian	Duke of Jiankang; 397–399	Succeeded by Himself as Prince of Northern Liang
Preceded by Himself as Duke of Jiankang	Prince of Northern Liang; 399–401	Suspended Title next held by Juqu Mengxun
Titles in pretence
Preceded by Lü Guang	— TITULAR — Emperor of China; 397–401; Reason for succession failure: Sixteen Kingdoms	Succeeded by Juqu Mengxun
Preceded by Lü Guang	— TITULAR — Emperor of China; 397–401; Reason for succession failure: Sixteen Kingdoms	Succeeded by Li Gao
