= Queen Tufa =

Western Qin princess

Queen Tufa (Chinese: 禿髮王后; personal name unknown) (died 423) was a queen of the Xianbei-led Chinese Western Qin dynasty. Her husband was Qifu Chipan (Prince Wenzhao).

She was the daughter of Tufa Rutan (Prince Jing), the last ruling prince of the Southern Liang dynasty. It is not completely clear when she married Qifu Chipan—it could have been around 400, when Qifu Chipan's father Qifu Qiangui (Prince Wuyuan) briefly surrendered to her uncle Tufa Lilugu (Prince Kang), then ruler of Southern Liang and, after leaving Qifu Chipan and his brothers as hostages, fled to the Later Qin dynasty. This could have been hinted at when, later that year, when Qifu Chipan tried to flee to Later Qin to join his father but was recaptured by Tufa Lilugu, Tufa Rutan spoke against his execution. Further, when Qifu Chipan was finally successful in fleeing to Later Qin in 402, Tufa Rutan delivered his wife and children to him. However, it is also possible that she married Qifu Chipan only after Qifu Chipan finally destroyed the Southern Liang in 414 and forced Tufa Rutan to surrender to him. In either case, in late 414, Qifu Chipan created her queen.

Qifu Chipan initially treated Tufa Rutan as an honored guest, but had him secretly poisoned in 415. Tufa Rutan, realizing what was happening, refused medical treatment to try to save his children. However, both Queen Tufa and her brother Tufa Hutai (禿髮虎台), Tufa Rutan's crown prince, found out what happened, and they secretly planned to kill Qifu Chipan to avenge their father. In 423, however, their sister, who was Qifu Chipan's left consort, betrayed their plans to Qifu Chipan, and Qifu Chipan had her and Tufa Hutai executed.

Chinese royalty
Preceded by Queen Bian	Queen of Western Qin; 414–423	Succeeded by Queen Liang
Preceded by Queen Bian	Queen of China (Southwestern Gansu/Southeastern Qinghai); 414–423	Succeeded by Queen Liang
Preceded by Queen Zhejue of Southern Liang	Queen of China (Southern Gansu/Eastern Qinghai); 414–423	Succeeded by Queen Liang
