= Queen Bian =

Queen Bian (Chinese: 邊王后; personal name unknown) was an empress of the Xianbei-led Chinese Western Qin dynasty. Her husband was Qifu Gangui (King Wuyuan).

Shortly after Qifu Gangui became king in 388, after the death of his brother, the founding king Qifu Guoren (King Xuanlie), he created her empress. Qifu Guoren was not mentioned as having created an empress, but could have. At that point, she was already described of as his wife. However, nothing more is known about her, including whether she was the mother of his eventual successor, his son Qifu Chipan (King Wenzhao). In 394, Qifu Gangui, in a political marriage, married the sister of the Former Qin emperor Fu Deng, the Empress Dongping, as queen, although presumably Empress Fu was deposed and Empress Bian restored after Former Qin's destruction by Later Qin later in 394, for after Qifu Gangui lost his state but restored it in 409, he again created Empress Bian empress. (The succession table below assumes as such.)

== See also ==
- Western Qin
- Qifu Gangui
- Qifu Guoren
- Qifu Chipan
- List of Chinese empresses

Chinese royalty
New dynasty	Empress of Western Qin; 388–394	Succeeded by Queen Fu
Preceded by Empress Yang of Former Qin	Queen of China (Southwestern Gansu/Southeastern Qinghai); 388–394	Succeeded by Queen Fu
Preceded by Empress Fu	Empress of Western Qin; 394–400	Dynasty interrupted
Preceded by Empress Fu	Empress of China (Southwestern Gansu/Southeastern Qinghai); 394–400	Succeeded by Empress Zhang of Later Qin
Dynasty resumed	Empress of Western Qin; 409–412	Succeeded by Empress Tufa
Preceded by Empress Zhang of Later Qin	Empress of China (Southwestern Gansu/Southeastern Qinghai); 409–412	Succeeded by Empress Tufa
