= Tufa Rutan =

Tufa Rutan 禿髮傉檀
- Prince of Liang

Ruler of Southern Liang
- Reign: 402–414
- Predecessor: Tufa Lilugu
- Born: 365
- Died: 415 (aged 49–50)
Full name
- Family name: Tūfǎ (禿髮); Given name: Rǔtán (傉檀, also read: Nùtán)
Era dates
- Hóng chāng (弘昌): 402–404; Jiā píng (嘉平): 408–414
Regnal name
- 402–404: Prince of Liang (涼王); 404–408: Ordered to hold tally, Commander in charge of military affairs in Heyou, Grand General of Chariots and Cavalry, Palace Guard General to Guard Xiongnu, Inspector of Liang Province (使持節、都督河右諸軍事、車騎大將軍、領護匈奴中郎將、涼州刺史); 408–414: Prince of Liang (涼王)
Posthumous name
- Prince Jǐng (景王, lit. "decisive")
- Dynasty: Southern Liang

Tufa Rutan or Tufa Nutan (Chinese: 禿髮傉檀; 365–415), formally Prince Jing of (Southern) Liang) ((南)涼景王), was the last prince of the Xianbei-led Chinese Southern Liang dynasty. As he was the son that his father, the Xianbei chief Tufa Sifujian (禿髮思復犍), considered most talented, his older brothers, the founding prince Tufa Wugu (Prince Wu) and Tufa Lilugu (Prince Kang) both decided to pass the throne to a brother, intending that he receive the throne. However, Tufa Rutan, while obviously talented as a general, is viewed by historians as being overly aggressive in waging military campaigns, and he greatly drained the resources of the Southern Liang while doing so. Southern Liang's strength particularly waned after a major 407 defeat at the hand of the Hu Xia emperor Helian Bobo, and it drew attacks from its neighbors Northern Liang and Western Qin. Eventually, Tufa Rutan was forced to surrender to Western Qin in 414 after Western Qin captured his capital Ledu (樂都, in modern Haidong Prefecture, Qinghai), and he was poisoned to death a year later.

== During the reigns of Tufa Wugu and Tufa Lilugu ==
After Tufa Wugu founded Southern Liang in 397 by breaking away from Later Liang, Tufa Rutan immediately began to play a major role in the military and governmental affairs of the state. In 398, Tufa Wugu sent him to assist the Later Liang rebels Yang Gui (楊軌) and Guo Nen (郭黁). In spring 399, after Tufa Wugu moved the capital from Lianchuan (廉川, in modern Haidong Prefecture, Qinghai) to Ledu (樂都, also in Haidong Prefecture) in a major realignment of his military strengths, Tufa Rutan was put in charge of the important city of Xiping (西平, in modern Xining, Qinghai), and by this time, he was referred to by the title of Duke of Guangwu, a title that Tufa Wugu himself had carried earlier. In summer 399, Tufa Wugu recalled him to Ledu to head his government, while replacing him at Xiping with Tufa Lilugu.

Later in 399, Tufa Wugu suffered a serious injury while horseriding when drunk, and, because his last words were that the state should be entrusted to someone old, was succeeded by Tufa Lilugu. Tufa Lilugu entrusted all important governmental matters to him and effectively designated him as the next prince.

In 400, when the Later Liang emperor Lü Zuan attacked Northern Liang, Tufa Rutan launched a raid at the Later Liang capital Guzang (姑臧, in modern Wuwei, Gansu), entering the city and, while not staying permanently in the city, held a feast in the city and forced 8,000 households to relocate back to Southern Liang with him.

Later in 400, when, in light of defeats by Later Qin, the Western Qin prince Qifu Qiangui surrendered to Tufa Lilugu, Tufa Lilugu sent Tufa Rutan to welcome him. It might have been at this time that Tufa Rutan gave a daughter in marriage to Qifu Qiangui's son Qifu Chipan, but it is not completely clear. What is clear is that later in the year, Qifu Qiangui took flight again and surrendered to Later Qin, and when Qifu Chipan tried to join Qifu Qiangui but was detained, it was at Tufa Rutan's suggestion that killing Qifu Chipan for wanting to join his father would appear narrow-minded that Tufa Lilugu did not execute Qifu Chipan.

It was around this time when Later Liang's general Jiang Ji (姜紀) surrendered to Southern Liang. Tufa Rutan, impressed by Jiang's talent, befriended him and spent much time with him, despite Tufa Lilugu's distrust of Jiang. Jiang, however, soon turned against Southern Liang and fled to Later Qin, offering its emperor Yao Xing strategies on conquering Later Liang and resisting Southern Liang.

Around the new year 402, the Later Liang rebel Jiao Lang (焦朗) sought aid from Southern Liang, and Tufa Lilugu sent Tufa Rutan to aid him, but when Tufa Rutan arrived, Jiao would not receive him. Tufa Rutan initially was angry and wanted to attack Jiao instead, but at the suggestion of his brother Tufa Juyan (禿髮俱延) reconciled with Jiao and jointly attacked Guzang and, while not capturing the city at the time, dealt the Later Liang general Lü Chao (呂超) a major defeat. Later that year, however, when Later Liang was attacked by Northern Liang's prince Juqu Mengxun, Tufa Rutan came to Later Liang's aid. He soon arrested Jiao and delivered him to Tufa Lilugu as well.

Later in 402, Tufa Lilugu died from illness, and he left instructions that the throne be passed to Tufa Rutan. Tufa Rutan accepted, and moved the capital from Xiping (where Tufa Lilugu had moved it) back to Ledu.

== Early reign ==
Tufa Rutan did not relent in his military pressure against Later Liang, and his attacks against Later Liang continued to have a destabilizing effect on Later Liang. He nominally agreed to be a Later Qin vassal, and was created the Duke of Guangwu, although he continued to internally use the title Prince of Hexi, which Tufa Lilugu used.

In summer 402, Qifu Chipan escaped and joined his father Qifu Gangui. Tufa Rutan delivered Qifu Chipan's wife (possibly Tufa Rutan's daughter) and children to him.

In 403, in light of pressure from Tufa Rutan and Juqu Mengxun, Lü Long decided to end his state, surrendering Guzang to Later Qin. Tufa Rutan, apprehensive of Later Qin's power, withdrew his troops to allow Later Qin forces through to Guzang to receive Lü Long and the city. In 404, he further ended his nominal independence (but not actual independence) by ending the use of his own era name and instead using Later Qin's to show allegiance to Later Qin. He stopped using his own princely title, and used only the Later Qin-created title of Duke of Guangwu. He also made a request to Yao Xing that he be allowed to have Guzang, but Yao Xing refused.

== Middle reign ==
While Southern Liang and Northern Liang had both become Later Qin vassals, they started sporadic but incessant warring with each other after their joint enemy, Later Liang, ceased existence. In 406, Tufa Rutan attacked Northern Liang but after Juqu Mengxun refused to engage him, withdrew, and he made a tribute of 3,000 horses and 30,000 cattle to Yao Xing, greatly touching Yao Xing and making him believing in Tufa Rutan's loyalty, and so he commissioned Tufa Rutan with governorship of Liang Province (涼州, at that time only Guzang and its surroundings), giving him Guzang. Later that year, Tufa Rutan moved his capital from Ledu to Guzang. He also entered into an alliance with Western Liáng's duke Li Gao, aimed against Northern Liang.

While Tufa Rutan was nominally a Later Qin vassal, he did not actually wish to serve Yao Xing long, and in 407 he proposed to Qifu Chipan (who had then temporarily taken over his father Qifu Gangui's troops, since Qifu Gangui was detained at the Later Qin capital Chang'an) an alliance, but Qifu Chipan executed his messengers and delivered their heads to Yao Xing. Still, at this time, Southern Liang's power was at its apex.

At this time, though, a major defeat would cause Southern Liang's strength to begin to wane. In winter 407, the Later Qin rebel Liu Bobo, who had earlier that year broken from Later Qin and established Xia, requested to marry Tufa Rutan's daughter. Tufa Rutan refused, and in anger Liu Bobo launched a punitive raid against Southern Liang but then retreated. Tufa Rutan gave chase and, believing that he greatly outpowered Liu Bobo, was careless in his military actions. Liu Bobo led him into a canyon and then blocked the exit with ice and wagons, and then ambushed him—and the defeat was such that it was said that 60% to 70% of Southern Liang's famed officials and generals died in the battle. Tufa Rutan barely escaped capture. In fear, Tufa Rutan ordered that all of the people within 150 kilometers of Guzang be moved into the capital, which immediately led to mass panic and a rebellion by the Chuge chief Cheng Qi'er (成七兒). While Cheng's rebellion was defeated, Tufa Rutan's domain had been greatly wounded.

In light of Tufa Rutan's defeat, Yao Xing plotted his destruction, despite the advice of Wei Zong (韋宗), an official of his who had personal knowledge of Tufa Rutan's ability, against such action. In 408, he commissioned his son Yao Bi (姚弼) the Duke of Guangping to lead a large force with generals Lian Cheng (斂成) and Qifu Gangui to make a surprise attack on Southern Liang—tricking Tufa Rutan into initially not resisting by informing him that the army was intended to be part of a pincer movement against Xia. Only when the Later Qin forces reached Guzang's vicinity did Tufa Rutan realize what the purpose of the campaign was, and he defended the city against Yao Bi. When a rebellion inside the city itself, led by Wang Zhong (王鍾), threatened to cause the city to fall, Tufa Rutan buried some 5,000 people alive, and he then defeated Yao Bi. When Yao Xing sent Yao Xian (姚顯) the Duke of Changshan to aid Yao Bi, Tufa Rutan defeated him as well, and Yao Xian, in fear, blamed Lian for the entire campaign and apologized to Tufa Rutan, and then withdrew with Yao Bi. Tufa Rutan also sent a messenger to Chang'an to request forgiveness.

In winter 408, Tufa Rutan again declared independence, and claimed the title of Prince of Liang, in light of Later Qin's defeats at his own hands and at the hands of Liu Bobo. He created his wife Lady Zhejue princess, and his son Tufa Hutai (禿髮虎台) crown prince.

== Late reign ==
The redeclaration of independence might have been intended to show strength, but by this point Southern Liang was in definite trouble, being in constant draining warfare with Northern Liang and (after Qifu Gangui also redeclared independence from Later Qin in 409) Qifu Gangui's Western Qin, and historians generally view Tufa Rutan as responsible for the continued deterioration of Southern Liang's strength by continuing to initiate wars as well despite the obvious fatigue his state was suffering.

In 410, one of Tufa Rutan's campaigns would hurt him greatly. He attacked Northern Liang and forced 1,000 households to move to his state. In retaliation, Juqu Mengxun pillaged a larger number of households from his state, and when Tufa Rutan's brother Tufa Juyan responded, Juqu Mengxun defeated him. When Tufa Rutan himself followed with a larger force, Juqu Mengxun defeated him as well, and then advanced on Guzang and put it under siege. The residents of Guzang, remembering the massacre that Tufa Rutan carried out during Wang Zhong's rebellion, panicked, and a large number surrendered to Juqu Mengxun. With his general Zhequ Qizhen (折屈奇鎮) also rebelling to the south, Tufa Rutan became apprehensive, and moved the capital from Guzang back to Ledu. The general Jiao Lang quickly rebelled and held Guzang, although Juqu Mengxun conquered it in 411, and then advanced on Ledu, sieging it for more than a month before Tufa Rutan submitted by sending his son Tufa Anzhou (禿髮安周) to Juqu Mengxun as a hostage.

However, Tufa Rutan soon again planned revenge, and later that year he launched another attack on Northern Liang, which was initially successful, but his army withdrew at an overly leisurely pace, and when the weather turned against him, Juqu Mengxun caught him and defeated him, again sieging Ledu, forcing him to then send his son Tufa Rangan (禿髮染干) as a hostage so that Juqu Mengxun would withdraw.

In 413, Tufa Rutan launched yet another campaign against Northern Liang, and was again defeated. Juqu Mengxun again put Ledu under siege but could not capture it. However, Tufa Rutan's general Tufa Wenzhi (禿髮文支) then rebelled, encouraging Juqu Mengxun to launch a new attack. Tufa Rutan was forced to send his brother Tufa Juyan to Northern Liang as a hostage.

In 414, the Tuoqihan (唾契汗) and Yifu (乙弗) tribes rebelled, and despite the state of desperation Southern Liang was in, Tufa Rutan, leaving his crown prince Tufa Hutai in command at Ledu, launched an attack against Yifu—which was quite successful. However, Qifu Chipan, who had by this point succeeded Qifu Gangui as Western Qin's prince, launched an attack on Ledu, sieging it. Tufa Hutai panicked, and forced the Han in the city into the inner citadel because he distrusted them, greatly weakening his own defense force, and Ledu fell. Tufa Hutai was captured.

Tufa Rutan's nephew Tufa Fani (禿髮樊尼, Tufa Wugu's son) escaped and informed Tufa Rutan what had happened. Tufa Rutan informed his troops that his plans were then to attack the Tuoqihan tribe, and then use the proceeds from the pillaging to ransom the people of Ledu from Western Qin. However, the troops, upon hearing the news, collapsed and deserted him. Tufa Rutan was forced to surrender to Western Qin as well.

== After end of Southern Liang ==
Qifu Chipan initially treated Tufa Rutan as an honored guest. He created Tufa Rutan the Duke of Zuonan and Tufa Rutan's daughter (whom he might have married far earlier, but could have also married at this time) his princess. However, in 415, he secretly had Tufa Rutan poisoned. After he was poisoned, Tufa Rutan realized what was happening, and refused all treatment. He died soon thereafter. In 423, Tufa Hutai and Princess Tufa, who plotted to try to avenge him, were discovered and executed by Qifu Chipan as well.

== Personal information ==
- Father
  - Tufa Sifujian (禿髮思復犍), Xianbei tribal chief
- Wife
  - Princess Zhejue (created 408)
- Children
  - Tufa Hutai (禿髮虎台), the Crown Prince (killed by Qifu Chipan 423)
  - Tufa Mingdegui (禿髮明德歸)
  - Tufa Anzhou (禿髮安周)
  - Tufa Rangan (禿髮染干)
  - Tufa Baozhou (禿髮保周)
  - Tufa He (禿髮賀), later changed name to Yuan He (源賀)
  - A daughter, later Princess Tufa of Western Qin (killed by Qifu Chipan 423)
  - A daughter, later Qifu Chipan's Left Consort

Prince Jing of (Southern) Liang House of Tufa Born: 365 Died: 415
Chinese royalty
Preceded by Tufa Lilugu	Prince of Southern Liang; 402–414	Extinct
Chinese nobility
New creation	Duke of Zuonan; 414–415	Extinct
Titles in pretence
Preceded by Tufa Lilugu	— TITULAR — Emperor of China; 402–414; Reason for succession failure: Annexed by Western Qin	Succeeded by Qifu Chipan
Preceded by Tufa Lilugu	— TITULAR — Emperor of China; 402–414; Reason for succession failure: Annexed by Western Qin	Succeeded by Juqu Mengxun
