= Tufa Wugu =

Xianbei chieftain, founder of Southern Liang (r. 397-399)

Tufa Wugu 禿髮烏孤
- Prince of Wuwei

Ruler of Southern Liang
- Reign: 397–399
- Successor: Tufa Lilugu
- Died: 399
Full name
- Family name: Tūfǎ (禿髮); Given name: Wūgū (烏孤)
Era name and dates
- Tài chū (太初): 397–399
Regnal name
- 397–398: Grand Commander, Grand General, Grand Chanyu, Prince of Xiping (大都督 大將軍 大單于 西平王) since 398: Grand Commander, Grand General, Grand Chanyu, Prince of Wuwei (大都督 大將軍 大單于 武威王)
Posthumous name
- Prince Wǔ (武王, lit. "martial")
Temple name
- Lièzǔ (烈祖)
- Dynasty: Southern Liang

Tufa Wugu (Chinese: 禿髮烏孤; died 399), formally Prince Wu of Wuwei (武威武王), was the founding prince of the Xianbei-led Southern Liang dynasty of China. He was initially a vassal of Later Liang's emperor Lü Guang, but seeing how Lü Guang was misruling his people, declared independence in 397. He ruled for only two years before he died from injuries suffered in a horse-riding accident.

== Prior to independence ==
Tufa Wugu's father Tufa Sifujian (禿髮思復鞬) was a great-grandnephew of the early Jin Dynasty (266–420) Xianbei general Tufa Shujineng, who had been a menace to Jin forces during the reign of Emperor Wu. Tufa Sifujian became tribal chief in 356 and was a Former Qin vassal, but it was not known when he died and was succeeded by Tufa Wugu.

Tufa Wugu himself was described as brave and ambitious, and he considered ways to take over Liang Province (涼州, modern central and western Gansu). His general Fen Tuo (紛陁) advised him that he had to be diligent, encourage agriculture, and rule efficiently and fairly. He strived to follow Fen's suggestions, and soon became known for his abilities. In 394, Lü Guang, the prince of Later Liang, sent messengers to commission Tufa Wugu as a general, and Tufa Wugu considered whether to accept it. Most of his advisors wanted to reject the commission, since they felt it humiliating to be Later Liang's vassal, but the strategist Shizhen Ruoliu (石真若留) pointed out that Tufa Wugu was not yet in shape to oppose Lü Guang, and that he should submit to make Lü Guang arrogant. Tufa Wugu agreed, and accepted the Later Liang posts.

In 395, Tufa Wugu attacked a number of unsubmissive tribes around his, including Yifu (乙弗) and Zhejue (折掘), forcing them to submit. He built Lianchuan Castle (廉川堡, in modern Haidong Prefecture, Qinghai) to serve as headquarters. Also in 395, Lü Guang created him the Duke of Guangwu.

In 396, when Lü Guang claimed the imperial title of "Heavenly King" (Tian Wang), he tried to confer some more honorific titles on Tufa Wugu, but this time Tufa Wugu refused, stating to Lü Guang's ambassador:

Heavenly King Lü's sons are all corrupt and immoral. His nephews are particularly violent and cruel. People both near and far are angry and ready to rebel. How can I go against the people and accept these unjust titles? I am about to claim a regal title myself.

Tufa Wugu therefore rejected the titles, although he kept the musicians and artisans that Lü Guang sent to him as part of the title bestowment.

In 397, after Lü Guang had suffered a loss on the battlefield against Western Qin's prince Qifu Gangui, Tufa Wugu declared himself the Prince of Xiping and changed era name, signifying a declaration of independence for Southern Liang. He then captured Later Liang's city Jincheng (金城, in modern Lanzhou, Gansu), which Later Liang had only captured from Western Qin earlier that year. Lü Guang sent his general Dou Gou (竇苟) to attack Southern Liang, but was defeated by Tufa Wugu.

== Reign ==
The major aim for Tufa Wugu was to weaken Later Liang and eventually capture its capital Guzang (姑臧, in modern Wuwei, Gansu), and later in 397, when Later Liang's rebel general, the prophet Guo Nen (郭黁), under attack by Lü Guang's son Lü Zuan, sought help from him, he sent his brother Tufa Lilugu to relieve Guo, although Guo later submitted to Western Qin. In 398, two other Later Liang rebel generals Yang Gui (楊軌) and Wang Qiji (王乞基) submitted to Tufa Wugu, and later that year Tufa Wugu defeated the powerful Qiang chief Liang Ji (梁饑), and after his victory, the Qiang and Xiongnu tribes south of the Hongchi Mountain (洪池嶺, in modern Wuwei as well) all submitted to him. Late in the year, he changed his title from Prince of Xiping to Prince of Wuwei, perhaps signifying his eventual design on Guzang.

In spring 399, Tufa Wugu moved his capital to Ledu (樂都, in modern Haidong Prefecture, Qinghai). It was described that, around this time, he was very effective at judging talent, and regardless of whether his subordinates were Han or of other ethnicities, he put them all in the right positions in accordance with their talent. He also sought advice on whom to attack first, among Western Qin, Later Liang, or Northern Liang. Pursuant to suggestions by Yang Tong (楊統), who pointed out that Lü Guang was incompetent and that his sons were distrusting of each other, and that Tufa Wugu should let his troops harass Later Liang's borders and eventually conquer it. When Lü Guang's sons Lü Shao and Lü Zuan attacked Northern Liang later that year, Tufa Wugu went to the Northern Liang prince Duan Ye's aid, helping to stave off the Later Liang attack.

Later that year, Tufa Wugu fell off his horse while drunk, and he suffered a severe chest injury. He remarked, while grinning, "I am making Lü Guang and his sons happy!" As his conditions worsened, he ordered that someone who is old should succeed him, and so his nobles supported his brother Tufa Lilugu as the new prince (as Prince Kang).

== Personal information ==
- Father
  - Tufa Sifujian (禿髮思復犍), Xianbei tribal chief
- Children
  - Tufa Fudan (禿髮赴單)
  - Tufa Fanni (禿髮樊泥)

Prince Wu of Wuwei House of Tufa Died: 399
Chinese royalty
New creation	Prince of Southern Liang; 397–399	Succeeded by Tufa Lilugu
Titles in pretence
Preceded by Lü Guang	— TITULAR — Emperor of China; 397–399; Reason for succession failure: Sixteen Kingdoms	Succeeded by Tufa Lilugu
