= Qifu Chipan =

Prince Wenzhao of Western Qin 西秦文昭王
- Prince of Western Qin

Ruler of Western Qin
- Reign: 412–428
- Predecessor: Qifu Gangui
- Successor: Qifu Mumo
- Died: 428
- Burial: Wuping Mausoleum (武平陵)
Full name
- Family name: Qǐfú (乞伏); Given name: Chìpán (熾磐)
Era dates
- Yǒngkāng (永康): 412–419; Jiànhóng (建弘): 419–428
Regnal name
- Grand General, Prince of Henan (大將軍 河南王, 412–414); Prince of Qin (秦王, 414–428)
Posthumous name
- Prince Wénzhāo (文昭王, lit. "civil and accomplished")
Temple name
- Tàizǔ (太祖)
- House: Qifu
- Dynasty: Western Qin

Qifu Chipan (Chinese: 乞伏熾磐; died 428), also known by his posthumous name as the Prince Wenzhao of Western Qin (西秦文昭王), was a prince of the Xianbei-led Chinese Western Qin dynasty. During his reign, the Western Qin reached its prime after he destroyed and seized the territory of the rival Southern Liang dynasty in 414, but it then began a gradual decline under attacks by the Hu Xia dynasty and Northern Liang dynasty. When he died in 428, he left his state in a troubled position, and by 431, the state was destroyed, and his son Qifu Mumo captured and then killed by the Hu Xia emperor Helian Ding.

== During Qifu Gangui's first reign ==
It is not known when Qifu Chipan was born to his father Qifu Gangui, nor is it known for certain who his mother was. However, it appears likely that he was born prior to Western Qin's establishment by his uncle Qifu Guoren (in 383), because he was Qifu Gangui's oldest son, and it also appears likely that his mother was Qifu Gangui's wife Queen Bian. In 388, after Qifu Guoren died, Qifu Gangui became prince.

The first historical reference to Qifu Chipan was in 393, when Qifu Gangui created Qifu Chipan crown prince. By this point, he was already described as brave and intelligent, and more capable than his father. He quickly became a key official in his father's administration.

== As Southern Liang and Later Qin subject ==
In 400, Qifu Gangui suffered a major defeat at the hands of the Later Qin emperor Yao Xing, and most of his state was seized by Later Qin. Qifu Gangui concluded that he could not sustain a state any more, and instructed his officials to surrender to Later Qin, while he himself surrendered to Southern Liang's prince Tufa Lilugu, who welcomed him as an honored guest. Tufa Lilugu's brother Tufa Juyan (禿髮俱延) suspected Qifu Gangui's intentions, and suggested that Tufa Lilugu exile him to the Yifu (乙弗) tribe (probably west of the Qinghai Lake), a suggestion that Tufa Lilugu rejected. However, worried that Qifu Gangui would try to reestablish his state, he sent an army to watch over him. Qifu Gangui, fearing that he would be executed, then regained trust from Tufa Lilugu by sending Qifu Chipan, his brothers, and their mother to the Southern Liang capital Xiping as hostages. He himself, however, as soon as the Southern Liang guard was down, fled to Fuhan (枹罕, in modern Linxia Hui Autonomous Prefecture, Gansu) and surrendered to Later Qin.

It might have been around this time that Qifu Chipan married the daughter of Tufa Lilugu's brother Tufa Rutan, and later, when Qifu Chipan tried to flee to Later Qin to join his father but was captured on the way, Tufa Rutan urged for his life against Tufa Lilugu's initial desire to execute him, and Tufa Lilugu agreed with Tufa Rutan. After Tufa Lilugu died in 402 and was succeeded by Tufa Rutan, Qifu Chipan successfully escaped and fled to his father, who by then had been made a key Later Qin general. Tufa Rutan sent Qifu Chipan's wife and children to him. Qifu Gangui, who was then in control of his old capital Yuanchuan (苑川, in modern Baiyin, Gansu), sent Qifu Chipan to the Later Qin capital Chang'an to visit the emperor Yao Xing, and Yao Xing made him a commandery governor.

In 407, concerned that Qifu Gangui was becoming stronger and more difficult to control, Yao Xing detained him while he was visiting Chang'an, and had Qifu Chipan take over his post. Later that year, when Tufa Rutan, who had nominally been a Later Qin vassal, considered renouncing that status, he sent messengers to Qifu Chipan urging him to join the rebellion. Qifu Chipan beheaded Tufa Rutan's messengers and sent their heads to Chang'an.

In 408, believing that Later Qin was growing weaker, he built a castle at Kanglang Mountain (嵻崀山, in modern Lanzhou, Gansu) to both prepare to defend himself against Later Qin's enemies and against a potential Later Qin campaign against him. In 409, he captured Fuhan from the Later Qin rebel Peng Xi'nian (彭奚念) and secretly sent messengers to inform Qifu Gangui of this. Qifu Gangui, who was then attending Yao Xing at Pingliang (平涼, in modern Pingliang, Gansu), then escaped and fled back to Yuanchuan to join him. Soon, Qifu Gangui moved his home base to Dujianshan (度堅山, in modern Baiyin, Gansu) but left Qifu Chipan in command of Fuhan. Late that year, Qifu Gangui redeclared independence with the title Prince of Qin, and he created Qifu Chipan crown prince again.

== During Qifu Gangui's second reign ==
Qifu Chipan became the person that his father relied on the most on military matters. He made the scholar Jiao Yi (焦遺) Qifu Chipan's teacher, and told Qifu Chipan to serve Jiao like a father, and Qifu Chipan did so.

In 411, Qifu Gangui, after some campaigns against Later Qin, agreed to nominally resubmit as a vassal, and Yao Xing created him the Prince of Henan and Qifu Chipan the Duke of Pingchang. Later that year, Qifu Gangui sent Qifu Chipan and his brother Qifu Shenqian (乞伏審虔) on a campaign against Southern Liang, and they had a major victory over Tufa Rutan's crown prince Tufa Hutai (禿髮虎台), capturing more than 100,000 animals.

In spring 412, Qifu Gangui moved the capital to Tanjiao (譚郊, in modern Linxia Hui Autonomous Prefecture, Gansu), leaving Qifu Chipan in command of Yuanchuan. In summer 412, while at Tanjiao, Qifu Gangui was assassinated by Qifu Guoren's son Qifu Gongfu (乞伏公府), who also killed more than 10 brothers of Qifu Chipan. Qifu Gongfu then took up a defense position at Daxia (大夏, in modern Linxia as well). Qifu Chipan sent his brothers Qifu Zhida (乞伏智達) and Qifu Muyigan (乞伏木奕干) to attack Qifu Gongfu, while moving the capital to Fuhan. Qifu Zhida, meanwhile, defeated Qifu Gongfu and executed him, his sons, and his brother Qifu Achai (乞伏阿柴). Qifu Chipan was now the undisputed heir, and he claimed the title Prince of Henan.

== Early reign ==
Early in his reign, Qifu Chipan continued his state's expansion at the expense of Tuyuhun, Southern Liang and Later Qin, and he further forced local tribes which were not under his father's rule into submission.

In 414, upon receiving news that Tufa Rutan was attacking rebellious Tuoqihan (唾契汗) and Yifu (乙弗) tribes, leaving Tufa Hutai in command of the Southern Liang capital Ledu (樂都, in modern Haidong Prefecture, Qinghai), Qiifu Chipan decided to make a surprise attack on Ledu. He quickly arrived at Ledu and put it under siege. Soon, Ledu fell, and he relocated Tufa Hutai and his subordinates to Fuhan, while sending his army further to face Tufa Rutan. Tufa Rutan's troops, hearing that Ledu had fallen, collapsed, and Tufa Rutan surrendered, ending Southern Liang and allowing Qifu Chipan to seize the remaining Southern Liang territory. Qifu Chipan welcomed him as an honored guest, creating him the Duke of Zuonan, and created Tufa Rutan's daughter his princess. However, in 415 he poisoned Tufa Rutan to death.

Having annexed Southern Liang into his state, in 414 Qifu Chipan claimed the greater title of Prince of Qin. He also resumed his attacks on Later Qin. However, now that there was no longer Southern Liang serving as a buffer between them, he soon got into constant warfare with Northern Liang's prince Juqu Mengxun, often at Western Qin's expense. In 416, he made peace with Juqu Mengxun. Meanwhile, in 416, with Later Qin under major attack from the Jin general Liu Yu, he sent messengers to Liu Yu offering to be a vassal, and Liu Yu gave him the title Duke of Henan. By 417, Liu Yu had destroyed Later Qin, but he did not further head west to attack Western Qin, which seized a number of Later Qin cities on the borders. By 418, however, Jin had again lost the Guanzhong region to Xia's emperor Helian Bobo, and Xia, strengthened by its victories over Jin, now posed a major threat against Western Qin.

== Late reign ==
In 420, Qifu Chipan created his son Qifu Mumo crown prince. That year, Qifu Chipan also received a nominal commission as a major general from Liu Yu, who had by now seized the Jin throne and established Liu Song.

In 421, the peace with Northern Liang ended, perhaps because Northern Liang had destroyed Western Liang in 420 and now could concentrate on warfare with its southern neighbor Western Qin. The battles were often inconclusive, but the war continued to wear Western Qin down.

In 423, Qifu Chipan made the declaration to his officials that he now believed that Northern Wei was the state favored by the gods, and that its emperors were capable, and so he would offer to be a Northern Wei vassal. He then sent messengers to Northern Wei, offering suggestions on how to conquer Xia. In 426, he again requested that Northern Wei attack Xia. (There were little records of conflicts between Western Qin and Xia at this stage, but the repeated pleas Qifu Chipan made to Northern Wei may suggest that he was suffering losses to Xia.)

Later in 426, Qifu Chipan would suffer a major defeat that would debilitate his state. He was attacking Northern Liang when Northern Liang's prince Juqu Mengxun persuaded the Xia emperor Helian Chang (Helian Bobo's son and successor) to attack Fuhan. Helian Chang, in response, sent his general Hulu Gu (呼盧古) to attack Yuanchuan and Wei Fa (韋伐) to attack Nan'an (南安, in modern Dingxi, Gansu), and while Western Qin was able to hold Yuanchuan, Nan'an fell, at great loss. In winter 426, Xia forces commanded by Hulu and Wei attacked Fuhan, forcing Qifu Chipan to move the capital to Dinglian (定連, also in Linxia), and Hulu and Wei then captured another important Western Qin city, Xiping (西平, in modern Xining, Qinghai), and while they then withdrew, Western Qin had been dealt a major blow.

In 427, Qifu Chipan moved his capital back to Fuhan, and hearing that Northern Wei had captured the Xia capital Tongwan (統萬, in modern Yulin, Shaanxi) and forced Helian Chang to flee to Shanggui (上邽, in modern Tianshui, Gansu), he sent his uncle Qifu Wotou (乞伏握頭) to offer tributes to Northern Wei. By this point, however, Western Qin was also still under constant attack by Northern Liang and Chouchi.

In summer 428, Qifu Chipan, after telling Qifu Mumo to try to make peace with Northern Liang by returning Juqu Mengxun's advisor Juqu Chengdu (沮渠成都), whom he had captured in 422), died, and Qifu Mumo succeeded him.

== Personal information ==
- Father
  - Qifu Gangui (Prince Wuyuan)
- Wife
  - Princess Tufa (created 414, executed 423), daughter of Tufa Rutan, prince of Southern Liang
- Major Concubines
  - Left Consort Tufa, daughter of Tufa Rutan
- Children
  - Qifu Mumo (乞伏暮末), the Crown Prince (created 420), later prince
  - Qifu Yuanji (乞伏元基)
  - Qifu Keshuluo (乞伏軻殊羅)
  - Qifu Chenglong (乞伏成龍)

Prince Wenzhao of (Western) Qin House of Qifu Died: 428
Chinese royalty
Preceded by Qifu Gangui	Prince of Western Qin; 412–428	Succeeded by Qifu Mumo
Titles in pretence
Preceded by Qifu Gangui	— TITULAR — Emperor of China; 412–428; Reason for succession failure: Sixteen Kingdoms	Succeeded by Qifu Mumo
Preceded by Tufa Rutan	— TITULAR — Emperor of China; 412–428; Reason for succession failure: Sixteen Kingdoms	Succeeded by Qifu Mumo
