= Tufa Lilugu =

Tufa Lilugu 禿髮利鹿孤
- Prince of Hexi

Ruler of Southern Liang
- Reign: 399–402
- Predecessor: Tufa Wugu
- Successor: Tufa Rutan
- Died: 402
Full name
- Family name: Tūfǎ (禿髮); Given name: Lìlùgū (利鹿孤)
Era name and dates
- Jiàn hé (建和): 400–402
Regnal name
- 399–401: Grand Commander, Grand General, Grand Chanyu, Prince of Wuwei (大都督 大將軍 大單于 西平王) since 401: Grand Commander, Grand General, Grand Chanyu, Prince of Hexi (大都督 大將軍 大單于 河西王)
Posthumous name
- Prince Kāng (康王, lit. "joyful")
- Dynasty: Southern Liang

Tufa Lilugu (Chinese: 禿髮利鹿孤; died April or May 402), formally Prince Kang of Hexi (河西康王), was a prince of the Xianbei-led Southern Liang dynasty of China. He was a younger brother of the founder Tufa Wugu (Prince Wu). He was described as a capable ruler open to different opinions. He was also, somewhat contradictorily, described as having entrusted most important affairs of state to his talented brother Tufa Rutan (Prince Jing) who later succeeded him.

== Before reign ==
The first historical reference to Tufa Lilugu was in 397, shortly after Tufa Wugu had declared independence from Later Liang and established Southern Liang. The fall of that year, Tufa Wugu sent him to assist the Later Liang rebel Guo Nen (郭黁). In summer 398, he, along with another Later Liang rebel, Yang Gui (楊軌), jointly battled Lü Zuan, the son of the Later Liang emperor Lü Guang, but was defeated by Lü Zuan, leading Yang Gui to eventually give up his rebellion and flee to Southern Liang. In 399, as part of Tufa Wugu's realignment of the state's defenses when moving the capital from Jincheng (金城, in modern Lanzhou, Gansu) to Ledu (樂都, in modern Haidong Prefecture, Qinghai), he was put in charge of Anyi (安夷, also in modern Haidong Prefecture). He was also described with the title Duke of Xiping at this point, although it was probably that Tufa Wugu created him with this title in 397, even though that was not mentioned. In summer 399, Tufa Wugu sent him to assist Northern Liang's prince Duan Ye when Northern Liang was under attack by Lü Zuan and Lü Guang's crown prince Lü Shao, forcing Lü Zuan and Lü Shao to withdraw. Soon thereafter, he was put in charge of the city of Xiping (西平, in modern Xining, Qinghai).

Later that year, Tufa Wugu suffered a serious horse-riding accident when drunk, and in his last words ordered that an older person be selected to succeed him. The Southern Liang nobles therefore selected Tufa Lilugu to succeed him.

== Reign ==
After succeeding Tufa Wugu, Tufa Lilugu moved the capital from Ledu to Xiping. In early 400, Lü Zuan, who had by that point become the emperor of Later Liang, planned to attack him—and Lü Zuan's official Yang Ying (楊穎), in trying to persuade Lü Zuan not to attack, described Tufa Lilugu's regime as one "with a united heart, with subordinates who faithfully carried out his instructions, with no opportunity to take advantage of," a description, if accurate, speaks well of Tufa Lilugu. Indeed, when Lü Zuan attacked anyway notwithstanding Yang's words, Tufa Wugu sent Tufa Rutan against him and defeated him.

In summer 400, when Lü Zuan made a major attack on Northern Liang, Tufa Rutan, probably at Tufa Lilugu's instruction, made a surprise attack on the Later Liang capital Guzang (姑臧, in modern Wuwei, Gansu), entering Guzang's eastern half and then retreating after successfully pillaging the city, forcing Lü Zuan to abandon his Northern Liang campaign.

Later that year, after Western Qin's prince Qifu Gangui was defeated by Later Qin, Qifu Gangui surrendered to Tufa Lilugu. Initially, Tufa Lilugu's brother Tufa Juyan (禿髮俱延) suspected Qifu Gangui's sincerity and requested that Qifu Gangui be exiled to west of the Qinghai Lake—a suggestion that Tufa Lilugu rejected on the grounds that if he did so, no one else would surrender to him. However, when Qifu Gangui subsequently redefected to Later Qin, Tufa Lilugu much regretted the decision not to exile or kill him. Later, when Qifu Gangui's son Qifu Chipan tried to defect as well to join his father, Tufa Lilugu was prepared to execute him, but at Tufa Rutan's urging (that killing a son for wanting to join his father would be seen as narrow-minded), did not do so.

In spring 401, at the urging of many of his officials, Tufa Lilugu considered declaring himself emperor. However, he accepted the advice from the general Tou Wulun (鍮勿崙) that such a declaration would make him a target for others, and did not do so; rather, he only changed his title from Prince of Wuwei (the title that Tufa Wugu also used) to Prince of Hexi, signifying a claim over the region west of the Yellow River. Later that year, he personally made a successful attack against Later Liang's emperor Lü Long (Lü Zuan's cousin).

Later in 401, there was an exchange between Tufa Lilugu and his official Shi Gao (史暠) that might have demonstrated both Tufa Lilugu's strengths and weaknesses as a ruler. This was at an occasion when Tufa Lilugu ordered his officials to offer frank criticism of his rule. Shi Gao, in response, said:

Each time, when your majesty sent generals on military campaigns, no one could oppose them. However, they do not treat pacifying the populace as the priority, but rather concentrated on relocating them. The people like stability in life and fear unfamiliar locales. That is why many people rebel or escape. This is why we continuously kill enemy generals and capture enemy cities, but our lands do not increase.

Tufa Lilugu agreed with Shi. However, there was no record of Tufa Lilugu changing his policies due to Shi's suggestions. Indeed, for the rest of Tufa Lilugu's reigns, there were continued references to forcible movements of people by Southern Liang troops.

Despite this, by this point, Tufa Lilugu's power appeared evident, so much so that in fall 401, the new prince of Northern Liang, Juqu Mengxun, was forced to send his son Juqu Xinian (沮渠奚念) as a hostage to Tufa Lilugu to show his submission. Tufa Lilugu, however, rejected Juqu Xinian as a hostage, stating that Juqu Xinian was too young and he wanted Juqu Mengxun to send his brother Juqu Ru (沮渠挐) -- a major strategist and general for Juqu Mengxun. Juqu Mengxun initially refused—stating that he needed Juqu Ru to assist him—which drew anger from Tufa Lilugu, who sent Tufa Juyan the Marquess of Zhangsong and another brother, Tufa Wenzhi (禿髮文支) the Marquess of Xingcheng against Northern Liang and captured Juqu Mengxun's cousin Juqu Shanshan'gouzi (沮渠鄯善苟子). Juqu Mengxun made a humbler submission after that point and sent his uncle Juqu Kongzhe (沮渠孔遮) to promise to send Juqu Ru as a hostage, before Tufa Lilugu would withdraw his troops and return the people they captured. However, Tufa Lilugu himself was aware of his own power's limitations, and he also nominally submitted to Yao Xing, the emperor of Later Qin, sending tributes to Yao Xing, and in 401, when Later Qin attacked Later Liang, he ordered his troops to withdraw to yield a path for Later Qin troops.

Around the new year 402, in response to a request for assistance from the Later Liang rebel Jiao Lang (焦朗), Tufa Lilugu sent Tufa Rutan to assist Jiao, and Tufa Rutan and Jiao then attacked Guzang, dealing Later Liang a major defeat. Oddly enough, however, when Northern Liang attacked Later Liang in spring 402, Tufa Lilugu sent Tufa Rutan to aid Later Liang, although by the time Tufa Rutan arrived, Northern Liang had already retreated.

Later in spring 402, Tufa Lilugu grew ill, and he instructed that the state be entrusted to Tufa Rutan. (Tufa Lilugu's father Tufa Sifujian had treasured Tufa Rutan's talents greatly—and stated to all of his sons that none was more talented than Tufa Rutan, an evaluation that Tufa Wugu and Tufa Lilugu agreed with, and therefore both decided to pass the throne to a younger brother rather than a son.) After Tufa Lilugu died, Tufa Rutan succeeded him as Prince Jing.

== Personal information ==
- Father
  - Tufa Sifujian (禿髮思復犍), Xianbei tribal chief

Prince Kang of Hexi House of Tufa Died: 402
Chinese royalty
Preceded by Tufa Wugu	Prince of Southern Liang; 399–402	Succeeded by Tufa Rutan
Titles in pretence
Preceded by Tufa Wugu	— TITULAR — Emperor of China; 399–402; Reason for succession failure: Sixteen Kingdoms	Succeeded by Tufa Rutan
