= Qifu Gangui =

Prince Wuyuan of Western Qin 西秦武元王
- Prince of Western Qin

Ruler of Western Qin
- Reign: 388–400
- Predecessor: Qifu Guoren
- Successor: In abeyance
- Reign: 409–412
- Predecessor: Recreated
- Successor: Qifu Chipan
- Died: 412
- Burial: Yuanping Mausoleum (元平陵)
Full name
- Family name: Qǐfú (乞伏); Given name: Qiánguī (乾歸, also read: Gānguī)
Era dates
- Tàichū (太初): 388–400; Gēngshǐ (更始): 409–412
Regnal name
- Grand Commander, Grand General, Grand Chanyu, Prince of Henan (大都督 大將軍 大單于 河南王, 388–389); Prince of Jincheng (金城王, 389–394); Prince of Henan (河南王, 394); Prince of Liang (梁王, 394); Prince of Qin (秦王, 394–400; 409–412)
Posthumous name
- Prince Wǔyuán (武元王, lit. "martial and discerning")
Temple name
- Gāozǔ (高祖)
- House: Qifu
- Dynasty: Western Qin

Qifu Gangui or Qifu Qiangui (Chinese: 乞伏乾歸; died 412), also known by his posthumous name as the Prince Wuyuan of Western Qin (西秦武元王), was a prince of the Xianbei-led Chinese Western Qin dynasty. He was a brother of the founding prince, Qifu Guoren (Prince Xuanlie), who became prince after Qifu Guoren's death in 388 because Qifu Guoren's son Qifu Gongfu (乞伏公府) was considered too young for leadership. He subsequently expanded the state's power and influence, but only to an extent, and in 400 after military losses to the Later Qin dynasty, his state was annexed by the Later Qin and he himself became a Later Qin general. However, after the Later Qin was weakened by defeats at the hands of its rebel general Helian Bobo's Hu Xia dynasty, Qifu Gangui redeclared independence in 409, but ruled only three more years before he was killed by Qifu Gongfu in a coup. His son Qifu Chipan (Prince Wenzhao) defeated Qifu Gongfu and succeeded him as the ruling prince.

Qifu Gangui was known for using military strategies designed to expose weaknesses and to mislead enemies into acting in an overly dangerous manner, and then strike when the enemy became overconfident.

== Early life ==
The first reference to Qifu Gangui in history was in 385, when his brother Qifu Guoren declared himself Chanyu and changed era name, thus signifying independence from Former Qin. At that time, Qifu Guoren named Qifu Gangui a major general. Nothing else is known about his life before or during Qifu Guoren's reign, other than an implied reference that he defeated the Former Qin general Wang Guang (王廣) in battle.

In 388, Qifu Guoren died. His son Qifu Gongfu was considered too young to take over the leadership, and the officials and generals supported Qifu Gangui to succeed Qifu Guoren, with the titles Grand Chanyu and Prince of Henan. (This title does not imply dominion over modern Henan; rather, it signified dominion over the portions of modern Gansu and Qinghai that are south of the Yellow River.)

== First reign ==
Qifu Gangui created his wife Lady Bian princess, and he also established a governmental structure designed similarly to a Han Chinese governmental structure. Over the next several years, Qifu Gangui used a variety of military and diplomatic pressure to get the various people around his—including people of Xianbei, Qiang, and Han ethnicities, to submit to him. Later in the year, he moved the capital from Yongshi (勇士城, in modern Lanzhou, Gansu) to Jincheng (also in Lanzhou).

In 389, the Former Qin emperor Fu Deng, to whom Qifu Guoren had nominally submitted as a vassal, created Qifu Gangui the Prince of Jincheng—a title that signified less dominion than his original title of Prince of Henan, because Jincheng Commandery only roughly corresponded to modern Lanzhou—but Qifu Gangui accepted the title.

In 390, the khan of Tuyuhun, Murong Shilian (慕容視連), submitted to Western Qin as a vassal, and Qifu Gangui created him the Prince of Bailan. However, after Murong Shilian died later that year and was succeeded by his more ambitious son Murong Shipi (慕容視羆), Murong Shipi rejected that title.

In 391, Qifu Gangui's general Yuezhi Jiegui (越質詰歸) rebelled, but after Qifu Gangui personally led an army against him, Yuezhi surrendered—and Qifu Gangui married the daughter of a clansman to Yuezhi, showing Qifu Gangui's tendency to try to personally connect with tribal chiefs to get them to submit to him. However, later 391, the strategy could have said to have backfired as the chieftain of the Poduoluo (破多羅) tribe, Moyigan initially submitted and sent two sons as hostages to him, seeking his aid in a campaign against another tribal chief, Da Dou (大兜). Qifu Gangui aided him and defeated Da in battle, and then sent Moyigan sons back to him, to try to get Moyigan to be more grateful of him. However, Moyigan instead turned against Qifu Gangui and aligned himself with the Tiefu chief Liu Weichen, and Qifu Gangui, in anger, attacked Moyigan and, in battle, fired an arrow that struck Moyigan's eye. During the campaign against Moyigan, however, Lü Guang the prince of Later Liang took this opportunity to attack Western Qin, forcing Qifu Gangui to withdraw to face him. This incident appeared to start several years of intermittent battles between Western Qin and Later Liang.

In 393, Qifu Gangui created his son Qifu Chipan as crown prince.

In 394, after the death of the Later Qin emperor Yao Chang, Fu Deng prepared a major offensive against Yao Chang's son and successor Yao Xing, and as part of the preparation he requested aid from Qifu Gangui and created Qifu Gangui the Prince of Henan and bestowed on him the nine bestowments. However, Fu Deng's campaign ended in failure, as his forces were defeated by Yao Xing's, and his brother Fu Guang (苻廣) and son Fu Chong abandoned his bases, forcing him to flee into the mountains. He then married his sister the Princess Dongping to Qifu Gangui as his princess and created him the Prince of Liang. Qifu Gangui sent his brother Qifu Yizhou (乞伏益州) to aid Fu Deng, but as Fu Deng came out of the mountains to join Qifu Yizhou's forces, Yao Xing ambushed and captured him, and then executed him. Qifu Yizhou then withdrew.

Fu Deng's son Fu Chong fled to Huangzhong (湟中, in modern Xining, Qinghai), then under Qifu Gangui's control, and claimed imperial title. However, in winter 394, Qifu Gangui expelled him, and he fled to one of his father's last remaining generals, Yang Ding the Prince of Longxi. Yang led his forces to join Fu Chong's to attack Qifu Gangui. Qifu Gangui sent Qifu Yizhou and two other generals, Qifu Ketan (乞伏軻彈) and Yuezhi Jiegui against Yang and Fu Chong, and Yang was initially successful against Qifu Yizhou. However, the three Western Qin generals then counterattacked and killed Yang and Fu Chong in battle.

Around the new year 395, Qifu Gangui claimed the title Prince of Qin—a greater title that implicitly made himself a rival of Later Qin, and the state thus became known in history as Western Qin. In the summer, he sent Qifu Yizhou to attack the unsubmitting Di chief Jiang Ru (姜乳), despite warnings that Qifu Yizhou had become arrogant from his victories. Qifu Yizhou indeed became unattentive and was defeated by Jiang. Later in the year, Qifu Gangui moved his capital from Jincheng to Xicheng (西城, in modern Baiyin, Gansu).

In fall 395, Lü Guang made a major attack on Western Qin. Under the advice of his officials Mi Guizhou (密貴周) and Mozhe Gudi (莫者羖羝), Qifu Gangui submitted to Lü Guang as a vassal and sent his son Qifu Chibo (乞伏敕勃) as a hostage to Lü Guang, and Lü Guang withdrew. However, Qifu Gangui soon regretted this arrangement and executed Mi and Mozhe.

In 397, determined to punish Qifu Gangui, Lü Guang launched a major attack against Xicheng . This frightened Qifu Gangui's officials enough that they recommended a retreat to Chengji (成紀, in modern Tianshui, Gansu) to the east, but Qifu Gangui, seeing weaknesses in Later Liang's forces despite their numbers, stood his ground. Later Liang forces were initially successful, capturing several major Western Qin cities, but Qifu Gangui tricked Lü Guang's brother and major general Lü Yan (呂延) the Duke of Tianshui into believing that he was retreating, and Lü Yan fell into a trap Qifu Gangui set and was killed. Lü Guang, in fear, withdrew to his capital Guzang (姑臧, in modern Wuwei, Gansu). In 398, Qifu Gangui sent Qifu Yizhou to attack Later Liang, and he recovered some of the territory previously lost.

Later in 398, Qifu Yizhou battled Murong Shipi and defeated him. Murong Shipi, in fear, sent his son Murong Dangqi (慕容宕豈) as a hostage and sought peace. Qifu Gangui married the daughter of a clansman to Qifu Dangqi.

In 400, Qifu Gangui moved his capital from Xicheng to Wanchuan (苑川, also in Baiyin).

In summer 400, Later Qin's general, Yao Xing's uncle Yao Shuode (姚碩德) launched a major attack against Western Qin. Initially, Qifu Gangui was successful in cutting off Yao Shuode's supply line, but Yao Xing then personally came to Yao Shuode's aid. Qifu Gangui divided his army to try to ascertain Later Qin's intentions, but the armies lost communication in the fog, and Later Qin attacked them and greatly defeated them, taking nearly the entire Western Qin army captive. Yao Xing advanced to Fuhan (枹罕, in modern Linxia Hui Autonomous Prefecture, Gansu), forcing Qifu Gangui to flee back to Jincheng. With his army lost, however, Qifu Gangui concluded that he could not sustain a state any more, and instructed his officials to surrender to Later Qin, while he himself surrendered to Southern Liang's prince Tufa Lilugu, who welcomed him as an honored guest. Tufa Lilugu's brother Tufa Juyan (禿髮俱延) suspected Qifu Gangui's intentions, and suggested that Tufa Lilugu exile him to the Yifu (乙弗) tribe (probably west of the Qinghai Lake), a suggestion that Tufa Lilugu rejected. However, worried that Qifu Gangui would try to reestablish his state, he sent an army to watch over him. Qifu Gangui, fearing that he would be executed, then regained trust from Tufa Lilugu by sending Qifu Chipan, his brothers, and their mother to the Southern Liang capital Xiping as hostages. He himself, however, as soon as the Southern Liang guard was down, fled to Fuhan and surrendered to Later Qin.

== As Later Qin general ==
Upon Qifu Gangui's arrival in the Later Qin capital Chang'an, Yao Xing created him the Marquess of Guiyi. In 401, Yao Xing inexplicably gave Qifu Gangui his entire captured army back to him and had him defend his old capital Wanchuan, effectively putting him back in the position he had before, but now as a Later Qin vassal. He quickly put his governmental structure back in place, but now with inferior titles to show submission to Later Qin. Later in 401, Yao Xing sent Qifu Gangui to serve as Yao Shuode's assistant in a major campaign against Later Liang's emperor Lü Long (Lü Guang's nephew), forcing Lü Long's submission.

In 402, Qifu Chipan, who had previously made an unsuccessful attempt to escape from Southern Liang to join his father, succeeded in fleeing to Wanchuan. The Southern Liang prince Tufa Rutan sent Qifu Chipan's wife (who might be Tufa Rutan's daughter) and children to join him.

In 403, Lü Long decided to give up his state (now consisting of little more than the capital city of Guzang) to Later Qin, ending Later Liang, and Qifu Gangui was one of the generals whom Yao Xing sent to escort Lü Long to Chang'an and to escort his replacement, the Later Qin general Wang Shang (王尚) to Guzang, which was at the point effectively surrounded by Southern Liang and Northern Liang forces.

For the next few years, Qifu Gangui appeared to begin to act more independently again. For example, in 405, apparently without Later Qin sanction, he attacked Murong Dahai (慕容大孩), the khan of Tuyuhun, and later in the year he battled fellow Later Qin vassal Yang Sheng (楊盛), the ruler of Chouchi.

Around the new year 407, Qifu Gangui went on an official visit to Chang'an. Yao Xing, apprehensive about Qifu Gangui's strength and independence, detained him and made him a minister, giving his command to Qifu Chipan.

In 408, with Tufa Rutan, who had previously submitted as a Later Qin vassal, acting independently but yet suffering many internal problems, Yao Xing became resolved to destroy Southern Liang, and Qifu Gangui was one of the generals he sent under the command of his son Yao Bi (姚弼) to try to destroy Southern Liang. However, Yao Bi's campaign resulted in failure, and while Tufa Rutan nominally continued to submit for a time, he soon declared full independence. In 409, Qifu Gangui himself escaped and returned to Wanchuan. Later in the year, he redeclared the Western Qin state with the title Prince of Qin and changed his era name.

== Second reign ==
After his restoration, Qifu Gangui again created his wife Princess Bian as princess and Qifu Chipan as crown prince, and he temporarily set his capital at Dujianshan (度堅山, in modern Baiyin, Gansu). In 410, he attacked Later Qin's Jincheng Commandery and captured it, and later in 410 moved the capital back to Wanchuan. He then captured several more Later Qin commanderies. However, in spring 411, he returned the captured officials to Later Qin and sought peace, offering to again submit as a vassal. Yao Xing created him the Prince of Henan. However, in winter 411 he again captured several Later Qin commanderies. In spring 412, he moved the capital to Tanjiao (譚郊, in modern Linxia Hui Autonomous Prefecture, Gansu), and left Qifu Chipan in charge of Wanchuan.

In summer 412, Qifu Guoren's son Qifu Gongfu killed Qifu Gangui in a coup and also killed more than 10 of Qifu Gangui's sons. After a short campaign between Qifu Gongfu and Qifu Chipan, Qifu Chipan succeeded and killed Qifu Gongfu. He took the throne as Prince Wenzhao.

== Notes ==
- It is unclear whether the character 乾 in his name should be pronounced "Gan" or "Qian" (both of which are common pronunciations for the character in modern Mandarin, depending on context). Since, prior to this article's creation, there were already a number of anticipatory Wikipedia links to "Qifu Gangui", "Gan" is used in this article.

== Personal information ==
- Father
  - Qifu Sifan (乞伏司繁), Xianbei tribal chief
- Wives
  - Queen Bian (created 388 and again in 409)
  - Queen Fu (created 394)
- Children
  - Qifu Chipan (乞伏熾磐), the Crown Prince and the Duke of Pingchang, later Prince Wenzhao
  - Qifu Chibo (乞伏敕勃)
  - Qifu Muyigan (乞伏木奕干)
  - Qifu Shenqian (乞伏審虔)
  - Qifu Zhida (乞伏智達)
  - Qifu Tanda (乞伏曇達)
  - Qifu Louji (乞伏婁機)
  - Qifu Qiannian (乞伏千年)
  - Qifu Woling (乞伏沃陵)
  - Qifu Shiyin (乞伏什寅) (executed by Qifu Mumo 429)
  - Qifu Baiyang (乞伏白養) (executed by Qifu Mumo 430)
  - Qifu Qulie (乞伏去列) (executed by Qifu Mumo 430)
  - Princess Pingchang, wife of Juqu Xingguo (沮渠興國), the heir apparent of Juqu Mengxun, the prince of Northern Liang

Prince Wuyuan of Henan House of Qifu Died: 412
Chinese royalty
Preceded by Qifu Guoren	Prince of Western Qin; 388–400	In abeyance Title next held by Himself
Recreated Title last held by Himself	Prince of Western Qin; 409–412	Succeeded by Qifu Chipan
Chinese nobility
Vacant Title last held by Zhang Tianxi	Marquess of Guiyi; 400–409	Unknown
Titles in pretence
Preceded by Qifu Guoren	— TITULAR — Emperor of China; 388–400; Reason for succession failure: Annexed by Later Qin	Succeeded by Yao Xing
Preceded by Fu Chong	— TITULAR — Emperor of China; 388–400; Reason for succession failure: Annexed by Later Qin	Succeeded by Yao Xing
Preceded by Yao Xing	— TITULAR — Emperor of China; 409–412; Reason for succession failure: Sixteen Kingdoms	Succeeded by Qifu Chipan
