= Qifu Guoren =

Prince Xuanlie of Western Qin 西秦宣烈王
- Prince of Yuanchuan (苑川王); Prince of Western Qin (posthumously)

Ruler of Western Qin
- Reign: 385–388
- Successor: Qifu Gangui
- Died: 388
Full name
- Family name: Qǐfú (乞伏); Given name: Guórén (國仁)
Era name and dates
- Jiànyì (建義): 385–388
Regnal name
- Grand Commander, Grand General, Grand Chanyu, Governor of Qinzhou & Hezhou (大都督 大將軍 大單于 領秦河二州牧, 385–387); Grand Commander, Commander in charge of barbarian military affairs, Grand General, Grand Chanyu, Prince of Yuanchuan (大都督 都督雜夷諸軍事 大將軍 大單于 苑川王, 387–388)
Posthumous name
- Prince Xuānliè (宣烈王, lit. "responsible and achieving")
Temple name
- Lièzǔ (烈祖)
- House: Qifu
- Dynasty: Western Qin

Qifu Guoren (Chinese: 乞伏國仁; died 388), also known by his posthumous name as the Prince Xuanlie of Western Qin (西秦宣烈王), was the founding monarch of the Xianbei-led Western Qin dynasty of China.

Qifu Guoren's father Qifu Sifan (乞伏司繁) was a Xianbei tribal chief in the modern southern/southwestern Gansu region who, after being defeated by the Former Qin general Wang Tong (王統), surrendered in 371 and was allowed to keep his tribe together as a Former Qin vassal. In 376, Qifu Sifan died, and Qifu Guoren succeeded him. When the Former Qin emperor Fu Jiān sought to conquer Jin Dynasty (266–420) to unite China in 383, Qifu Guoren was initially going to serve as a general in his advance troops, but at that time, Qifu Guoren's uncle Qifu Butui (乞伏步頹) rebelled, and Fu Jiān sent Qifu Guoren to put down his uncle's rebellion. Instead, Qifu Guoren and Qifu Butui joined forces, and Qifu Guoren declared that Former Qin had worn out its people and that he was establishing an independent state—although at that time he did not take any regal title or declare a new era name.

In 385, after hearing about Fu Jiān's death at the hands of another rebel general, Yao Chang (the founder of Later Qin), Qifu Guoren did declare himself chanyu and changed the era name, thus effectively declaring a break from Former Qin, and thus this date was typically considered the founding date of Western Qin. He divided his domain into 12 commanderies, and he established his capital at Yongshicheng (勇士城, in modern Lanzhou, Gansu). Over the next two years, he gradually drew the Xianbei and other ethnicities into his state.

In 387, however, contrary to his prior stance against Former Qin, Qifu Guoren accepted the title of Prince of Yuanchuan bestowed on him by the Former Qin emperor Fu Deng and nominally became a Former Qin vassal again, although he did not use the Former Qin era name.

In summer 388, Qifu Guoren died. His son Qifu Gongfu (乞伏公府) was still young, and his subordinates supported his brother Qifu Gangui to succeed him.

== Personal information ==
- Father
  - Qifu Sifan (乞伏司繁), Xianbei tribal chief
- Children
  - Qifu Gongfu (乞伏公府) (executed 412)
  - Qifu Achai (乞伏阿柴) (executed 412)

Prince Xuanlie of Wanchuan House of Qifu Died: 388
Chinese royalty
New creation	Prince of Western Qin; 385–388	Succeeded by Qifu Gangui
Titles in pretence
Preceded by Fu Pi	— TITULAR — Emperor of China; 385–388; Reason for succession failure: Sixteen Kingdoms	Succeeded by Qifu Gangui
