= Southern Liang (Sixteen Kingdoms) =

Xianbei dynasty, one of the Sixteen Kingdoms (397–404; 408–414)

Southern Liang (南涼) 西平 (397), 武威 (397–401), 河西 (401–402), 涼 (402–404; 408–414)
- 397–404, 408–414
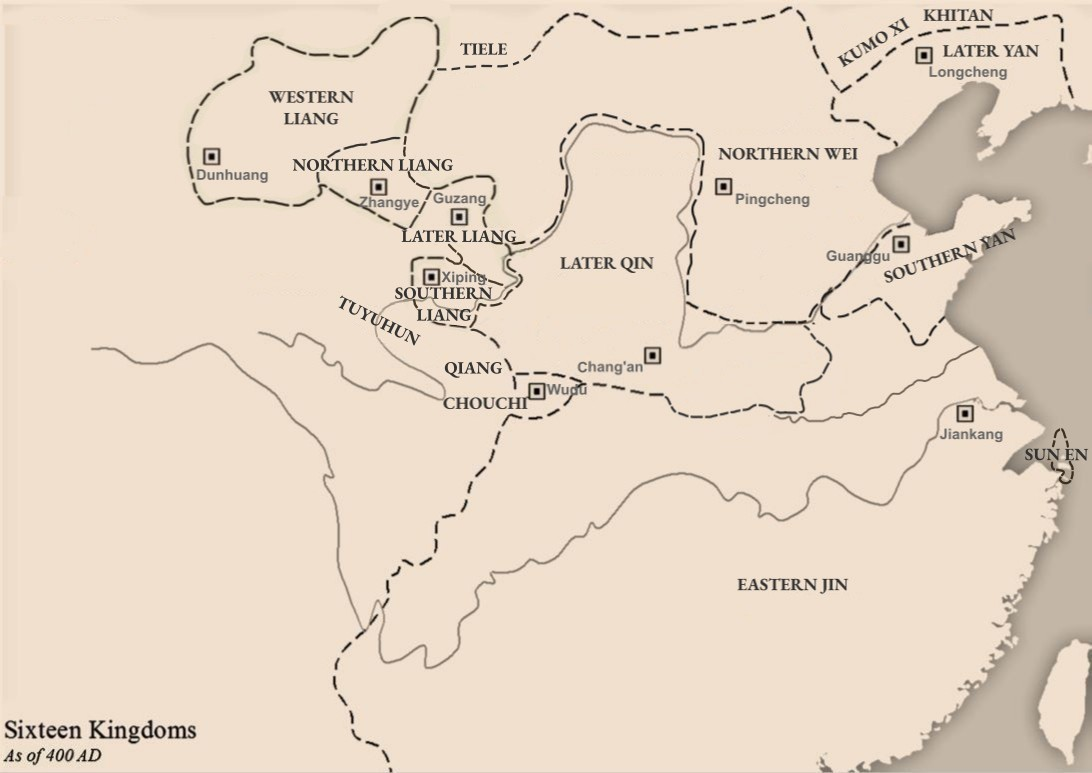

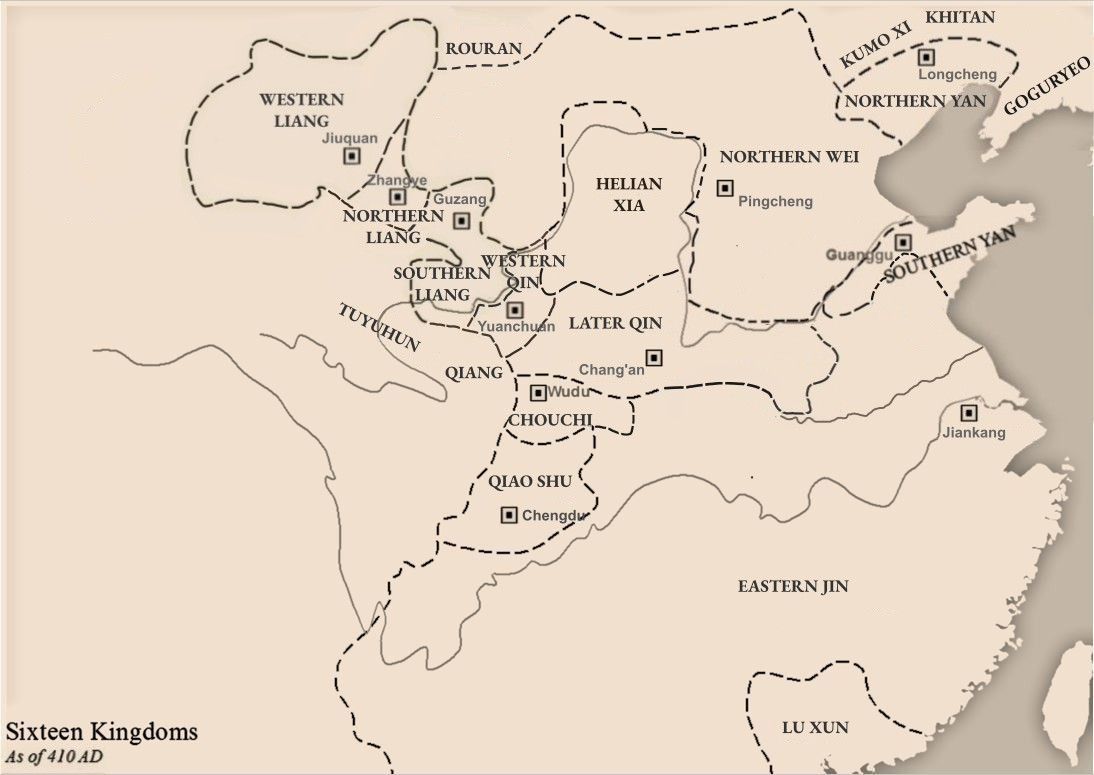
- Status: Vassal of Later Qin
- Capital: Lianchuan (397–399); Ledu (399, 402–406, 410–414); Xiping (399–402); Guzang (406–410)
- Government: Monarchy
- Prince
  - 397–399: Tufa Wugu
  - 399–402: Tufa Lilugu
  - 402–414: Tufa Nutan
Preceded by	Succeeded by
Later Liang (Sixteen Kingdoms)	Western Qin; Northern Liang
- Today part of: China

The Southern Liang (Chinese: 南涼; pinyin: Nán Liáng; 397–404, 408–414) was a dynastic state of China listed as one of the Sixteen Kingdoms in Chinese historiography. Members of the ruling Tufa clan were of Xianbei ethnicity and distant relatives of the Tuoba imperial house of the Northern Wei dynasty. According to the Book of Jin, the surname of the ruling house was changed from Tuoba to Tufa because one of the Tufa ancestors was born on a blanket, and in the Xianbei language, "Tufa" meant "blanket."

All rulers of the Southern Liang proclaimed themselves wang (king). The state was briefly discontinued in 404 after Tufa Rutan surrendered to the Later Qin, but restored in 408. As the state grew in power, the Tufa rulers also elevated their peerages before claiming the title of King of Liang in 402. It was hence only known as "Liang" (涼) from 402 to 404 and 408 to 414. They are given the prefix of "Southern" in historiography as they were based south of the other Liang states in northeastern Qinghai, although after occupying central Gansu, they briefly shifted the capital to the major city of Guzang (姑臧, in modern Wuwei, Gansu).

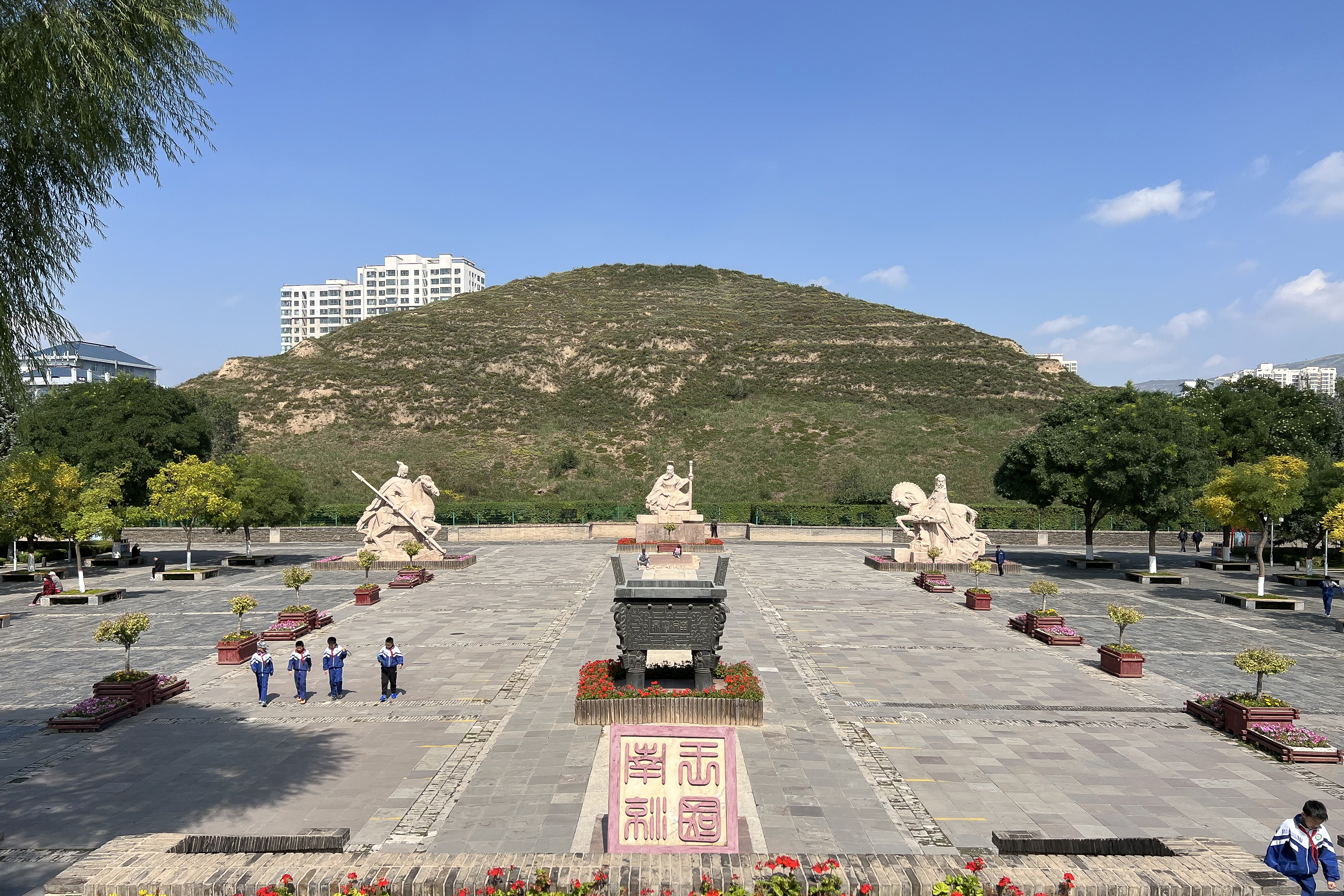
The Hutai Ruins (虎台遗址) in present-day Xining, Qinghai, one of the few remains of the Southern Liang.

== History ==
=== Background ===
The Xianbei Tufa tribe was an offshoot of the Tuoba. In the early 4th-century, their chieftain, Pigu (匹孤), led his followers west to the Hexi Corridor from the Yin mountains after his brother, Tuoba Liwei, succeeded their father. They lived among the Han Chinese and Qiang people, and adopted the Tufa family name. During the Cao Wei period, they surrendered to the general, Deng Ai and were relocated to what later became known as Qin province. In 270, their chieftain Tufa Shujineng led a massive tribal rebellion against the Western Jin dynasty. Although he captured Liang province in 279, the rebellion ended after he was killed that same year.

The Tufa returned to prominence during the Former Qin collapse that followed the Battle of Fei River. In 386, their chieftain, Tufa Sifujian (禿髮思復鞬) allied with Zhang Dayu, who sought to restore the Former Liang, but Dayu was defeated and executed by the Later Liang. At the time, the Tufa were living around Guangwu Commandery (廣武郡; around present-day Yongdeng County, Gansu) in Liang province.

After Sifujian died, his son, Tufa Wugu succeeded him. Wugu expanded his influence by encouraging agriculture among his followers and drilling them for war while recruiting new talents to join him. He caught the attention of the Later Liang ruler, Lü Guang who granted him offices and the title of Duke of Guangwu. In 394, he subjugated the Yifu (乙弗), Zhejue (折掘) and other tribes in Qinghai, where he built a fort in Lianchuan (廉川堡, in modern Haidong Prefecture, Qinghai) and made it his capital. Wugu refused to acknowledge Lü Guang's claim as Heavenly King in 396, although did not outwardly rebel just yet.

=== Founding ===
After Later Liang suffered a heavy defeat to Western Qin in 397, Tufa Wugu proclaimed himself the Prince of Xiping and changed the era name, signifying a breakaway. Soon, the Northern Liang was also established by Duan Ye at Jiankang (建康, in modern Zhangye, Gansu), while a revolt broke out at the Later Liang capital, Guzang (姑臧, in modern Wuwei, Gansu) led by Guo Nun, throwing Later Liang into a state of civil war. In 398, after defeating the powerful Qiang leader, Liang Ji (梁飢), many governors and tribes around Later Liang began submitting to him. Wugu changed his title to Prince of Wuwei and moved the capital to Ledu (樂都, in modern Haidong Prefecture, Qinghai) before dying of illness resulting from a horse riding accident.

After Tufa Lilugu succeeded his brother, he shifted the capital to Xiping (西平郡; around present-day Xining, Qinghai) and claimed the title of Prince of Hexi. During his reign, the situation in Later Liang had worsened after Lü Guang's death due to infighting among the ruling family. Lilugu concentrated military efforts against Later Liang, defeating them twice and entering an alliance with Northern Liang. As the Later Qin in Guanzhong encroached on Hexi, he avoided conflict and submitted to them as a vassal.

Lilugu died in 402 and was succeeded by his brother Tufa Rutan, who took the title of King of Liang. Rutan moved the capital back to Ledu and intensified attacks on the Later Liang. Eventually, Later Liang surrendered over their territory to Later Qin in 403. Rutan assured his vassalage to Qin by adopting their era name within his territory in 404. Still, he remained largely independent and continued attacking Northern Liang despite also being a Qin vassal. In 406, Qin rewarded Rutan's loyalty by handing him control over Guzang, which he later made his capital. He also entered an alliance with the Western Liang to counter Northern Liang.

=== Decline and fall ===
In 407, Tufa Rutan decided to break off relations with Later Qin, but his rule would enter a gradual decline from this point on. That year, he invaded the Northern Liang but was badly routed, and afterwards, he was heavily defeated by the Helian Xia in the Ordos where many of his key officials died in battle. Confidence in the state began to wane as rebellions soon broke out, although they were quickly put down. In 408, capitalizing on Southern Liang's troubles, Later Qin attacked them and laid siege on Guzang, during which there was a revolt attempt within the city. Rutan repelled the attack and made peace with Later Qin, later re-declaring himself the King of Liang, but his state had been greatly weakened by these series of crises.

In the next few years, Rutan launched several campaigns on Northern Liang but was repeatedly defeated. The defeat in 410 saw more rebellions breaking out in his territory, leading to the capital being shifted back south to Ledu while Guzang fell to Northern Liang. He also faced attacks from the Tuyuhun and Western Qin. By 413, Southern Liang had been reduced to only a few commanderies along the Huangshui River.

In 414, the Yifu, Tuoqihan (唾契汗) and other tribes in Qinghai rebelled. At the same time, the Southern Liang had also been suffering from poor harvest and famines for many years. Desperate to escape his situation, Rutan campaigned against the tribes, but while he was away, the Western Qin attacked and captured Ledu, prompting the rest of Southern Liang's territory to surrender. Rutan was forced to surrender, thus ending the Southern Liang.

Tufa Rutan was initially treated with honor in Western Qin, but by the end of 414, he was poisoned to death by their ruler, Qifu Chipan. In 423, Rutan's children, Princess Tufa and Tufa Hutai (禿髮虎台) attempted to assassinate Chipan but were caught and executed. The Tufa fled to Northern Liang and then to the Northern Wei, where the ruling Tuoba clan recognized them as family due to their lineage from Tuoba Jiefen. In particular, Rutan's son, Tufa Poqiang, became a powerful official in Wei and was given the name Yuan He by the Wei emperors, his new family name "Yuan" (源) in reference to them having a common ancestor. Tufa Wugu's son, Tufa Fanni (禿髮樊泥), is alleged by the Old Book of Tang to be the ancestor of the Tibetan Empire's imperial family.

== Rulers of the Southern Liang ==
Temple name	Posthumous name	Personal name	Durations of reign	Era names
Liezu	Wu	Tufa Wugu	397–399	Taichu (太初) 397–399
–	Kang	Tufa Lilugu	399–402	Jianhe (建和) 399–402
–	Jing	Tufa Nutan	402–414	Hongchang (弘昌) 402–404; Jiaping (嘉平) 409–414

== The family tree of Southern Liang rulers ==
Southern Liang

Tufa Sifujian
Tufa Wugu 禿髮烏孤 d. 399; Wu 武 r. 397–399	Tufa Lilugu 禿髮利鹿孤 d. 402; Kang 康 r. 399–402	Tufa Rutan 禿髮傉檀 365–415; Jing 景 r. 402–414	Princess Zhejue
Qifu Chipan; Wenzhao of (Western) Qin r. 412–428	Princess Tufa d. 423	Yuan He 源賀 b. 403–d. 479

== See also ==
- Wu Hu
- List of past Chinese ethnic groups
- Qinghai
- Sixteen Kingdoms
- Tuoba
- Xianbei
