= Helian Chang's empress =

Very little is known about Helian Chang's empress, the wife of Helian Chang.

When the Xia capital Tongwan (in modern Yulin, Shaanxi) fell to Northern Wei forces in 427, she was captured, along with her mother-in-law, even though her husband fled to Shanggui (in modern Tianshui, Gansu). Nothing is known about her fate after she was captured. After Helian Chang was captured by Northern Wei in 428, Emperor Taiwu of Northern Wei married one of his sisters, the Princess Shipping, to him.

Chinese royalty
Preceded by Empress Liang	Empress of Xia ?–427	Succeeded by Helian Ding's empress
Preceded by Empress Liang	Empress of China (Central Shaanxi/Eastern Gansu) ?–427	Succeeded by Helian Ding's empress
Preceded by Empress Liang	Empress of China (Northern Shaanxi) ?–427	Succeeded by Empress Helian of Northern Wei
