= Empress Liang (Xia) =

Empress Liang (梁皇后, personal name unknown) was an empress of the Xiongnu-led Chinese Hu Xia dynasty. Her husband was the founding emperor, Helian Bobo (Emperor Wulie).

Very little is known about Empress Liang. She was not Helian Bobo's first wife, as prior to his becoming emperor he had married Lady Poduoluo, the daughter of the Xianbei chief Moyigan. However, when he rebelled against Later Qin in 407 and established Xia, he made a surprise attack on Moyigan, who was then a Later Qin general, and killed him, and presumably Lady Poduoluo was either killed or divorced. In 414 (though other sources say 413), he made Lady Liang, who was by then described as his wife, empress. There are no later direct reference to Empress Liang.

In 427, when Emperor Taiwu of Northern Wei entered the Xia capital Tongwan (in modern Yulin, Shaanxi) after forcing Helian Bobo's successor Helian Chang to flee, he was mentioned as having captured Helian Bobo's and Helian Chang's empresses, and presumably the person referred to as Helian Bobo's empress was Empress Liang. The succession table below assumes that she survived her husband.

Chinese royalty
Preceded by None (dynasty founded)	Empress of Xia; 407–425	Succeeded by Helian Chang's empress
Preceded by Empress Qi of Later Qin	Empress of China (Northern Shaanxi); 407–425	Succeeded by Helian Chang's empress
Preceded by Yao Hong's empress of Later Qin	Empress of China (Eastern Gansu); 416–425	Succeeded by Helian Chang's empress
Preceded by Yao Hong's empress of Later Qin	Emperor of China (Central Shaanxi); 418–425	Succeeded by Helian Chang's empress
