= Emperor Mingyuan of Northern Wei =

Emperor Mingyuan of Northern Wei 北魏明元帝
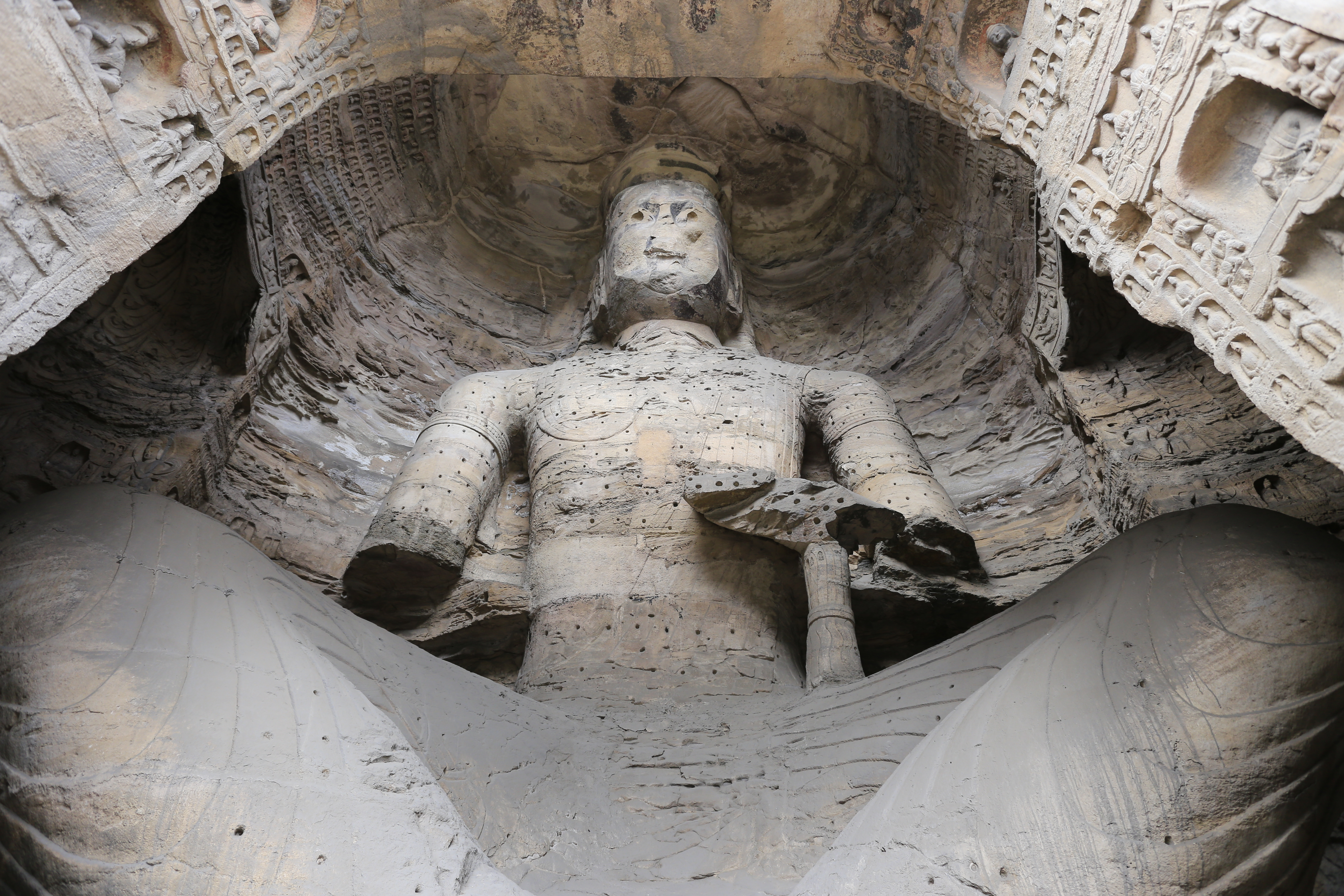
- Statue of Emperor Mingyuan at Yungang Grottoes

Emperor of Northern Wei
- Reign: November 10, 409 – December 23, 423
- Predecessor: Emperor Daowu
- Successor: Emperor Taiwu
- Born: 392
- Died: December 24, 423
- Burial: Jin Mausoleum of Yunzhong (雲中金陵)
- Consorts: Empress Zhao'ai; Empress Mi
- Issue: Emperor Taiwu; Tuoba Pi; Tuoba Mi; Tuoba Fan; Tuoba Jian; Tuoba Chong; Tuoba Jun; Princess Wuwei; Princess Shiping; Princess Longxi
Full name
- Family name: Tuòbá (拓跋); Given name: Sì (嗣)
Era dates
- Yǒngxīng (永興) 409–413; Shénruì (神瑞) 414–416; Tàicháng (泰常) 416–423
Posthumous name
- Emperor Mingyuan (明元皇帝) ("understanding and discerning")
Temple name
- Tàizōng (太宗)
- House: Tuoba
- Dynasty: Northern Wei
- Father: Emperor Daowu
- Mother: Empress Xuanmu

Emperor Mingyuan of Northern Wei ((北)魏明元帝) (392 – 24 December 423), Chinese name Tuoba Si (拓跋嗣), Xianbei name Mumo (木末), was an emperor of the Xianbei-led Northern Wei dynasty of China. He was the oldest son of the founding emperor Emperor Daowu. During his reign, Northern Wei's territory did not expand as much as it did under either his father's reign or the reign of his son Emperor Taiwu, but he helped the state stabilize over northern China, and started the tradition of meeting with important imperial officials to listen to their advice and make final decisions. He is generally regarded by historians to be an intelligent and rational ruler.

== Early life ==
Tuoba Si was born in 392 after his father Tuoba Gui had founded Northern Wei in 386 but before he had conquered most of rival Later Yan's territory and claimed imperial title in 399. His mother was Tuoba Gui's favorite consort, Consort Liu, the daughter of the Tiefu chief Liu Toujuan (劉頭眷). He was born at the capital Yunzhong (雲中, in modern Hohhot, Inner Mongolia.) He was Tuoba Gui's oldest son, and his father was said to be so pleased by this late arrival of a son that he declared a general pardon. (Based on Northern Wei's official history, Tuoba Gui would only be 21 at this point; this might be further evidence corroborating the alternative version of his life history.) (The Book of Song, compiled by the rival Southern Qi dynasty, would state that Tuoba Si was Tuoba Gui's second son. However, since there are no clear inconsistencies with Tuoba Si being Tuoba Gui's eldest son as presented in the Book of Wei, the Book of Wei's account is generally considered to be the correct one.)

As Tuoba Si grew, he was said to be a wise and kind young man, whose actions were all in accordance with proper protocol. In contrast, his oldest younger brother Tuoba Shao (拓跋紹) was described as being a violent young man, and he would often go out on the streets to rob people and violently attack animals. Tuoba Si tried to correct his brother's behaviour with rebukes, but Tuoba Shao did not change, so Tuoba Si lived in fear of his brother. In 403, Tuoba Gui, by this point emperor (as Emperor Daowu), created him the Prince of Qi. In 409, Emperor Daowu was intent on creating Tuoba Si crown prince, but based on the Tuoba tradition that when an heir is decided upon, his mother must be put to death, Emperor Daowu forced Consort Liu to commit suicide. Either before or after he did so, he summoned Tuoba Si to explain to him that this tradition was also in accordance with Emperor Wu of Han's rationale to put his favorite concubine, Consort Zhao (Emperor Zhao of Han's mother) to death, to avoid overly great maternal influence on a young emperor. After Tuoba Si left his father's presence, because of the affection that he had for his mother, he mourned greatly. Hearing this, Emperor Daowu summoned him back to the palace—and, because Emperor Daowu, in his late reign, often displayed great paranoid and violent tendencies, the new crown prince's attendants suggested that he not go to the palace but hide in the country. Tuoba Si agreed and did so, fleeing the capital Pingcheng, where Emperor Daowu had moved the capital in 398.

Meanwhile, Emperor Daowu had, because of Tuoba Shao's crimes, imprisoned Tuoba Shao's mother Consort Helan and planned to execute her. Consort Helan sent her son a message, asking him to save her. In response, Tuoba Shao assassinated Emperor Daowu and then tried to take over as emperor, and he tried to seize the troops. Tuoba Si, upon hearing this news, returned to Pingcheng but hid himself, while trying to gather supporters gradually. Tuoba Shao tried to seek him out to kill him, but the imperial guards gradually shifted to Tuoba Si's side, and the imperial guards arrested Tuoba Shao and presented him to Tuoba Si. Tuoba Si executed Tuoba Shao, Consort Helan, and Tuoba Shao's associates. He then took the throne as Emperor Mingyuan.

== Early reign ==
Emperor Mingyuan, contrary to his father's dictatorial style, instituted a council of eight officials to advise him on all important decisions, with the intent to hear different opinions and then take informed actions. The council mostly constituted of ethnic Xianbei from his tribe, but also included Han and other ethnicities. This became a tradition that was followed by his descendants as well.

At the time of Emperor Mingyuan's ascension to power, the paranoia and violence of Tuoba Gui's late reign had caused many problems within Northern Wei, with the officials described as idle and arrogant, the law as not properly enforced, crime so common that criminals would act in public without fear of repercussions, and many people too afraid to go outside in alleyways. Emperor Mingyuan established officials to hear the people's lawsuits and ensure that legal cases were judged fairly, restored officials who had earlier been removed from office, and issued government relief for the people's hardships. Due to this, many of the problems of Tuoba Gui's later years were eliminated.

Emperor Mingyuan himself was known for his competence in handling state affairs, and his reputation for this was such that the officials in charge of enforcing justice would be stern in their enforcement of the law in order to avoid making mistakes. However, Emperor Mingyuan did have the capacity for forgiveness and leniency in his decisions. As an example, when the minister An Tong (安同) conscripted people for labour without permission, the other ministers suggested that he be punished harshly, yet Emperor Mingyuan believed that An Tong's motives were in the interests of the common people, so he pardoned An Tong. Despite this, Emperor Mingyuan was also known for being perceptive in his investigations, and his standards were so exacting that his officials would often receive punishment. For example, in 413, one of his key advisors, Tuoba Qu (拓跋屈) the Marquess of Yuancheng, suffered a major defeat at the hands of rebel forces backed by Xia, and then, once demoted to governorship of Bing Province (并州, modern central and southern Shanxi), indulged in alcohol while neglecting affairs of state, and Emperor Mingyuan executed him (Because Tuoba Qu's son Tuoba Mohun (拓跋磨渾) had major contributions in helping Emperor Mingyuan defeat Tuoba Shao, the later historian Hu Sanxing, in his annotations to the Zizhi Tongjian, criticised Emperor Mingyuan's execution of Tuoba Qu as ungrateful for Tuoba Mohun's contributions).

In 410, Emperor Mingyuan sent one of his advisors, Baba Song (拔拔嵩) the Duke of Nanping to attack the Rouran, and when Baba was surrounded by Rouran troops, Emperor Mingyuan personally led an army to relieve Baba. For the next years, he often left the capital Pingcheng to examine the defenses on the northern and eastern fronts (with Rouran and Northern Yan), to make sure that his state would be properly defended against enemies. Another feature of his early reign was that he would frequently have to raise armies to put down rebellions.

In 411, due to frequent floods and droughts in Northern Wei, Emperor Mingyuan reduced palace expenses by releasing excess palace women, and he ordered that they marry unmarried men to increase labour and population. Like his father, a feature of Emperor Mingyuan's reign was the commissioning of construction projects to expand Pingcheng as a capital and general state infrastructure.

== Middle reign ==
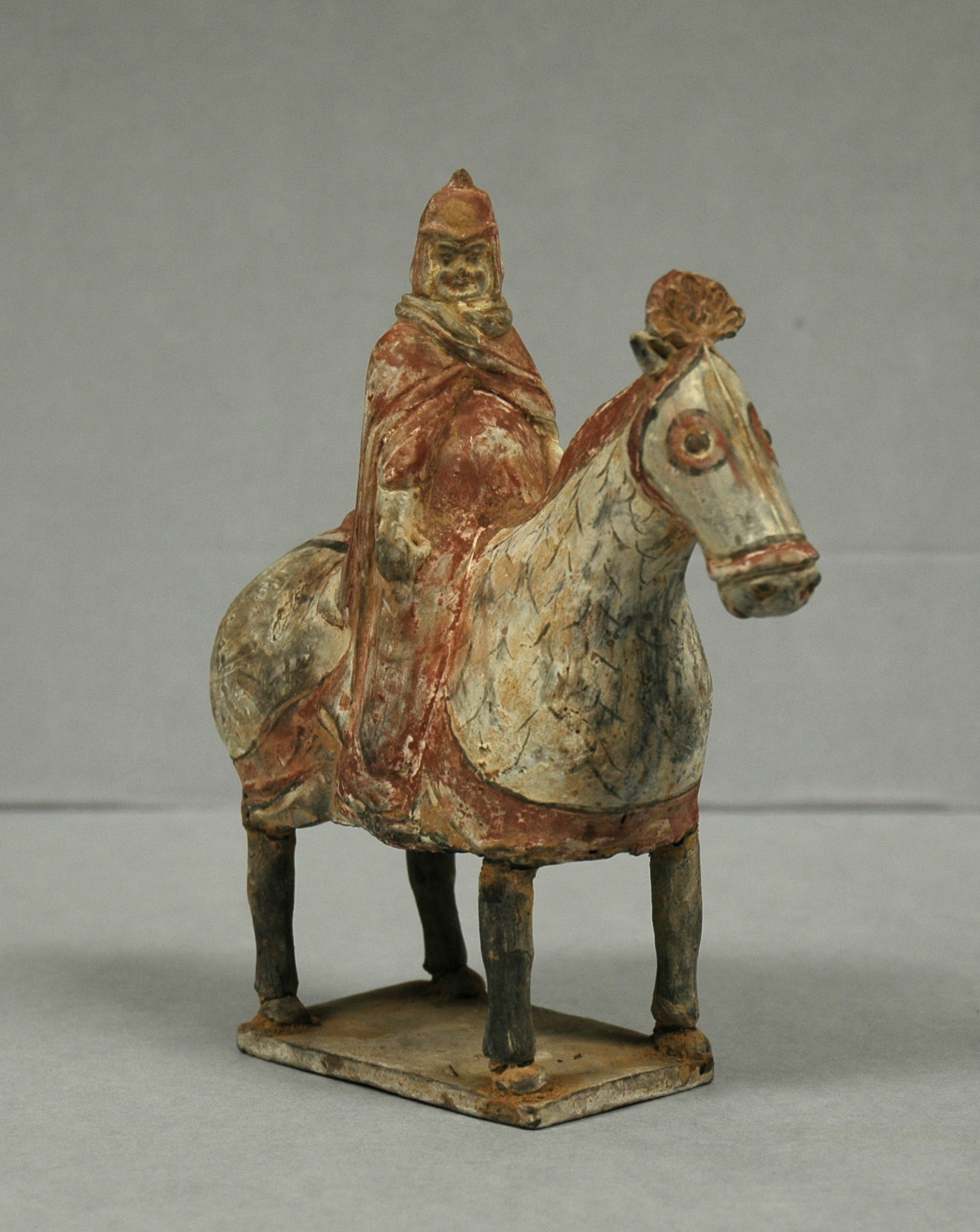
Northern Wei armoured horseman tomb figurine

In 414, Emperor Mingyuan sent ambassadors to Later Qin, Northern Yan, Jin, and Rouran, to try to establish peaceful relationships. The Later Qin and Jin missions were apparently largely successful, but his ambassador Huniuyu Shimen (忽忸于什門) had a conflict with the Northern Yan emperor Feng Ba over Feng Ba's insistence that Huniuyu kneel to him, and Feng Ba detained Huniuyu and refused to establish relations with Northern Wei. How successful the Rouran mission was is harder to gauge, for although initially it appeared to be successful, by new year 415 the Rouran Khan Yujiulü Datan (郁久閭大檀) invaded, and Emperor Mingyuan was forced to respond, chasing Yujiulü Datan back to his territory, but when Emperor Mingyuan sent his advisor Daxi Jin to pursue Yujiulü Datan, the Northern Wei forces ran into severe weather and suffered many casualties based on frostbite. This would start a theme that would last for centuries—often, Rouran would attack, and Northern Wei would counter-attack successfully, but then become unable to have decisive victories over Rouran.

Late in 414, Emperor Mingyuan began to have his official Cui Hao (the son of his key advisor Cui Hong) teach him the ancient texts of I Ching and Hong Fan (洪範) – both mystical texts. Emperor Mingyuan had always been fond of mysticism and divination, and also often asked Cui Hao to make predictions based on those texts, which often came true. Cui Hao therefore became increasingly trusted and consulted by Emperor Mingyuan for important decisions.

In 414-5, Emperor Mingyuan became frustrated with the rampant corruption that officials were engaging in - a problem common in Northern Wei, because officials had no proper salary. In 414, he ordered that people be allowed to go to the palace to make direct reports to him on the illegal actions of officials, and when sending officials to check the wealth of the officials, he ordered that everything that was not used to sustain their family be confiscated as illegally obtained goods. In 415, believing the local officials to be idle in their jobs, he issued a fine on those who did not properly raise tax from those under them. Whether these policies had any effect on official corruption is unknown, but official corruption was still a major problem in the reign of his successor Emperor Taiwu.

In 415, the northern regions of Northern Wei suffered a major famine, causing Emperor Mingyuan to consider moving the capital southward to Yecheng (鄴城, in modern Handan, Hebei), but at the advice of Cui Hao and the official Zhou Dan (周澹), who believed that such a move would quickly expose the actual numerical inferiority of the Xianbei to the Han, he kept the capital at Pingcheng, but also pursuant to Cui and Zhou's suggestion, moved a number of impoverished Xianbei to the modern Hebei region. After the famine, Emperor Mingyuan issued an edict to encourage land cultivation. From then, the agricultural situation greatly improved, leading to a thriving livestock economy.

In winter 415, pursuant to a peace agreement they had reached earlier, Later Qin's emperor Yao Xing sent his daughter the Princess Xiping to Northern Wei to be married to Emperor Mingyuan. He welcomed her with ceremony fitting an empress. However, Tuoba customs dictated that only a consort who was able to craft a gold statue by her hands could be empress, and Princess Xiping was unable to, so Emperor Mingyuan only created her an imperial consort, but within the palace honored her as wife and empress.

In 415-6, Emperor Mingyuan would have to deal with a major rebellion - that of the Xiongnu of Shangdang and Henei commanderies. Initial efforts to defeat the rebellion were unsuccessful, but in 416, on the advice of Cui Hong, Emperor Mingyuan sent the general Yizhan Jian to supervise the army he had sent to quell the rebellion. The rebellion was crushed, and Yizhan Jian captured a large amount of the rebel force.

In 416, the Jin general Liu Yu launched a major attack on Later Qin, intending to destroy it. As part of Liu Yu's force, a fleet commanded by the general Wang Zhongde (王仲德), approached Northern Wei's only main outpost south of the Yellow River, Huatai (滑台, in modern Anyang, Henan), the Northern Wei general Yuchi Jian (尉遲建), apprehensive of the Jin forces, abandoned Huatai and fled back north of the Yellow River. Emperor Mingyuan executed Yuchi and then sent messengers to rebuke Liu Yu and Wang Zhongde, both of whom restated that the target was Later Qin, not Northern Wei, and that the city would be returned as soon as the campaign was over. (However, Jin did not actually return Huatai, and Northern Wei would not have a major presence south of the Yellow River again until 422.)

Also in 416, because the general Kunuguan Bin (庫傉官斌) had earlier defected from Northern Yan to Northern Wei but then back to Northern Yan, Emperor Mingyuan used this as a pretext to launch an attack on Northern Yan, and his forces not only killed Kunuguan Bin but his relatives Kunuguan Chang (庫傉官昌) and Kunuguan Ti (庫傉官提), both of whom held important posts in Northern Yan.

Jin forces quickly captured Later Qin's major city Luoyang and then headed toward the Later Qin capital Chang'an. In spring 417, The Later Qin emperor Yao Hong (Yao Xing's son) requested emergency assistance. Emperor Mingyuan summoned his council to consider whether to launch armies to try to stop Jin advances to try to save Later Qin. Most of his advisors, apprehensive at whether Liu Yu actually intended to attack Northern Wei as well, suggested that Emperor Mingyuan try to intercept Liu Yu's forces. However, Cui Hao opined that this would precisely make Northern Wei the target of Jin attacks, and Emperor Mingyuan partially agreed, but still sent some 100,000 men, commanded by Baba Song, to guard the northern bank of the Yellow River to prepare for battle. If a Jin ship were blown by the wind to the northern bank, Northern Wei forces would seize the ship and kill or capture its crew, and when Jin forces then landed on the northern banks, Northern Wei forces would temporarily retreat, and then re-establish the northern bank defensive posture as soon as Jin forces reboarded their ships. Angry at this harassment, Liu Yu sent his general Ding Wu (丁旿) to land on the northern bank and deal Northern Wei forces a major defeat. This ended Emperor Mingyuan's attempts to save Later Qin, and there were no further Jin/Northern Wei battles throughout the campaign, as while Emperor Mingyuan still planned to cut off Liu Yu's path if he were stopped by Later Qin forces, Liu Yu was able to capture Chang'an and destroy Later Qin by fall 417, and Emperor Mingyuan's planned attacks never materialized. Many former Jin officials who opposed Liu Yu who had taken refuge with Later Qin fled to Northern Wei, and Emperor Mingyuan further ordered that anyone who could save and deliver members of the Yao imperial clan to Pingcheng would be greatly rewarded. (How effectively this order was is not known, and most members of the Yao clan were captured and killed by Liu Yu.)

== Late reign ==
In 418, Emperor Mingyuan launched a major attack on Northern Yan and put the Northern Yan capital Helong (和龍, in modern Jinzhou, Liaoning) under siege, but was unable to capture Helong and forced to retreat.

During Emperor Mingyuan's late reign, he requisitioned additional resources from the people in addition to regular taxes several times, however, Emperor Mingyuan also gave out several tax exemptions to reduce the burden on populations affected by flooding, and he would reduce or exempt the taxes of people who lived near places where he had been on tour. The state saw plentiful harvests during this period, and experienced relative stability, and after 417 there were no popular uprisings for the rest of his reign.

Throughout Emperor Mingyuan's reign, due to the relative stability of Northern Wei compared to other states that were experiencing turmoil, many people submitted or migrated to Northern Wei, which received an influx of these migrants. As an example of this, a group of families had declared allegiance to Northern Wei upon Later Qin's destruction, and Emperor Mingyuan established the official Kou Zan (寇讚) in position to manage these people. They eventually grew to number tens of thousands of households, and so Emperor Mingyuan created a new province of Southern Yong to govern them, and it is described that the number of refugees entering the southern border of Northern Wei tripled after this.

In 420, Emperor Mingyuan's wife Consort Yao died, and regretting that he could never give her the title in life, he posthumously honored her as an empress.

In 422, Emperor Mingyuan suffered a major illness, which is attributed to his taking of the popular alchemical drug Cold Food Powder for many years. He consulted Cui Hao on what he should do to prepare for events after his death. Cui Hao predicted that he would recover, but advised him to create his oldest son, 14-year-old Tuoba Tao the Prince of Taiping, crown prince, and then transfer some of the authorities to the crown prince so that his own burdens could be lessened. Baba Song also agreed, and Emperor Mingyuan created Tuoba Tao crown prince, and further had Crown Prince Tao take the throne to serve as the secondary emperor. He commissioned his key advisors Baba, Cui, Daxi Jin, An Tong (安同), Qiumuling Guan (丘穆陵觀), and Qiudun Dui (丘敦堆) to serve as the Crown Prince's advisor. From this point on, most matters, particularly domestic matters, were ruled on by Crown Prince Tao, while Emperor Mingyuan himself only ruled on important matters.

Later in 422, after hearing about the death of Liu Yu (who had seized the Jin throne in 420 and established Liu Song), Emperor Mingyuan broke off relations with Liu Song and called his council, informing the advisors that he planned to attack and seize three major cities south of the Yellow River from Liu Song—Luoyang, Hulao, and Huatai, despite Cui's opposition. He commissioned Daxi as the commander of the forced to attack Liu Song.

Daxi first put Huatai under siege, but after he was unable to capture it quickly, Emperor Mingyuan personally led an army south to aid Daxi. He also had Crown Prince Tao lead an army to the northern border, to guard against a Rouran attack. Huatai then fell, and Daxi then approached Hulao and Luoyang. Meanwhile, Emperor Mingyuan also sent Yizhan Jian and the generals E Qing (娥清), Lü Dafei (閭大肥) and Pu Ji (普幾) east, capturing several commanderies in modern western Shandong. However, while other cities in Song's Qing Province (青州, modern central and eastern Shandong) fell as well, the Northern Wei forces were unable to capture the capital of Qing Province, Dongyang (東陽, in modern Qingzhou, Shandong), and were eventually forced to withdraw after food supplies ran out and a large number of soldiers grew ill. Northern Wei forces also stalled in their siege of Hulao, defended by the capable Liu Song general Mao Dezu (毛德祖), but in the meantime, Daxi Jin took Xuchang (許昌, in modern Xuchang, Henan), while another general, Wuniuyu Lidi captured Luoyang in spring 423, cutting off the path of any Liu Song relief force for Hulao. In summer 423, Hulao fell. The campaign then ceased, with Northern Wei now in control of much of modern Henan and western Shandong. Despite his fierce resistance to Northern Wei, Emperor Mingyuan respected Mao Dezu's loyalty to his state in defending Hulao, and so in an action that appeared typical for him, he spared the lives of the defenders of Hulao.

In 423, Emperor Mingyuan also started a major building project—the building of a wall on the northern borders to defend against Rouran attacks.

In winter 423, Emperor Mingyuan died from Chinese alchemical elixir poisoning. Crown Prince Tao took the throne as Emperor Taiwu.

The Book of Wei would later emphasise Emperor Mingyuan's interest in Chinese scholarship and history. He compiled 30 chapters of literary works throughout his life.

== Family ==
=== Consorts and issue ===
- Empress Zhao'ai, of the Yao clan (昭哀皇后 姚氏; d. 420)
- Empress Mi, of the Du clan (密皇后 杜氏; d. 420)
  - Tuoba Dao, Emperor Taiwu (太武皇帝 拓跋燾; 408–452), 1st son
- Furen, of the Murong clan (夫人 慕容氏)
  - Tuoba Pi, Prince Li of Leping (樂平戾王 拓跋丕; d. 444), 2nd son
- Furen, of the Murong clan (夫人 慕容氏)
  - Tuoba Fan, Prince Xuan of Le'an (樂安宣王 拓跋範; d. 444), 4th son
- Furen, of the Yin clan (夫人 尹氏)
  - Tuoba Jian, Prince Zhuang of Yongchang (永昌莊王 拓跋健; d. 441), 5th son
- Unknown
  - Tuoba Mi, Prince Shang of Anding (安定殤王 拓跋彌; d. 424), 3rd son
  - Tuoba Chong, Prince Jing of Jianning (建寧景王 拓跋崇; d. 453), 6th son
  - Tuoba Jun, Duke Xinxing (新興公 拓跋俊; d. 441), 7th son
  - Princess Yangdi (阳翟公主)
    - Married Yao Huangmei, Duke of Longxi Commandery (陇西郡公姚黄眉)
  - Princess Wuwei (武威公主)
    - Married Juqu Mujian, Prince Hexi (d. 447) in 437, and had issue (two daughters)
    - Married Li Gai, Duke Nan (李蓋) in 447
  - Princess Shiping (始平公主)
    - Married Helian Chang, Prince Qin (d. 434) in 428
  - Princess Longxi (隴西公主)
    - Married Yao Hedou (姚和都)

Regnal titles
Preceded by Emperor Daowu of Northern Wei	Emperor of Northern Wei; 409–423	Succeeded by Emperor Taiwu of Northern Wei
Preceded by Emperor Daowu of Northern Wei	Emperor of China (Northern); 409–423	Succeeded by Emperor Taiwu of Northern Wei
Preceded by Emperor Shao of Liu Song	Emperor of China (Henan); 423	Succeeded by Emperor Taiwu of Northern Wei
