= Empress Helian =

Empress consort of Northern Wei
- Tenure: 432–452

Empress dowager of Northern Wei
- Tenure: 452

Grand empress dowager of Northern Wei
- Tenure: 452–453
- Spouse: Emperor Taiwu of Northern Wei
Posthumous name
- Empress Taiwu
- Father: Helian Bobo

Empress Helian (赫連皇后; died 453), formally Empress Taiwu (太武皇后), was an empress of the Xianbei-led Chinese Northern Wei dynasty. Her husband was Emperor Taiwu.

She was a daughter of the Hu Xia's founding emperor Helian Bobo (Emperor Wulie). In 428, during the reign of her brother Helian Chang, Emperor Taiwu led his Northern Wei forces to capture the Xia capital Tongwan (統萬, in modern Yulin, Shaanxi), and while Helian Chang fled, she was captured along with most nobles and officials of Xia. She and her two sisters were all taken as Emperor Taiwu's imperial consorts. In 432, she was created empress, presumably after being able to pass the traditional Tuoba tribe test by being able to forge a gold statue.

Little is known about Empress Helian's life during her husband's reign. She did not bear him any sons. In 452, he was assassinated by his eunuch, Zong Ai, who claimed that by her orders Emperor Taiwu's son, Tuoba Yu the Prince of Nan'an should be made emperor, bypassing Emperor Taiwu's apparent intended heir, Tuoba Jun, the son of Tuoba Huang the Crown Prince, who had died in 451.

Tuoba Yu honored her as empress dowager, but there is no particular evidence to suggest that Empress Helian was actually involved in Zong's conspiracy. Later that year, Zong assassinated Tuoba Yu as well, but the officials then overthrew Zong and put Tuoba Jun on the throne as Emperor Wencheng, and he honored her as grand empress dowager. She died in 453.

== In popular culture ==
- Portrayed by Wan Meixi in the 2016 Chinese TV series The Princess Weiyoung.

Chinese royalty
Preceded by Empress Murong	Empress of Northern Wei; 432–452	Succeeded by Empress Feng
Preceded by Empress Murong	Empress of China (Northern); 432–452	Succeeded by Empress Feng
Preceded by Empress Sima Maoying of Liu Song	Empress of China (Henan); 432–452	Succeeded by Empress Feng
Preceded by Helian Chang's empress of Xia	Empress of China (Northern Shaanxi); 432–452	Succeeded by Empress Feng
Preceded by Helian Ding's empress of Xia	Empress of China (Central Shaanxi/Eastern Gansu); 432–452	Succeeded by Empress Feng
Preceded by Princess Murong of Northern Yan	Empress of China (Liaoning); 436–452	Succeeded by Empress Feng
Preceded by Princess Tuoba of Northern Liang	Empress of China (Central/Western Gansu); 439–452	Succeeded by Empress Feng
