= Daxi Jin =

- 達奚斤

Senior General of Ten Thousand Cavalry (萬騎大將軍)
- In office ?–448
- Monarch: Emperor Taiwu of Northern Wei

Personal details
- Born: 369 Yu County, Hebei
- Died: 448
- Children: Daxi Taguan; Daxi Heguan; Daxi Ba; More than twenty unnamed sons
- Parent: Daxi Dan (father)
- Han name: Xi Jin (奚斤)
- Peerage: Prince of Hongnong (弘農王)
- Posthumous name: Zhao (昭)

Daxi Jin (369–448), Han name Xi Jin, was a Xianbei military general of the Northern Wei during the Northern and Southern dynasties period. In his early career, he aided in suppressing rebellions and in expeditions against the Rouran and other northern steppe tribes. Later on, he was a commander in Emperor Mingyuan's southern expedition against the Liu Song dynasty, seizing the key cities of Huatai (滑台, in modern Anyang, Henan), Hulao and Xuchang. During Emperor Taiwu's war against the Helian Xia, his forces captured Chang'an and the Xia emperor, Helian Chang. However, in a rash attempt to claim credit for conquering the Xia, he led a failed assault on their capital at Pingliang, in which he and his subordinates were taken prisoners. Upon his rescue and return to Wei, he was humiliated by Taiwu, but was allowed to continue serving in the government, eventually dying as an honoured minister at an old age.

== Background and early life ==
Daxi Jin was born the son of Daxi Dan (達奚簞), a horse breeder who worked under the Tuoba-Xianbei state of Dai. His father had a grudge against the Dugu chieftain, Liu Kuren, who once stole a fine horse from his stable named "Gualiu" (騧騮). In 376, the Dai was conquered by the Former Qin dynasty, and the Dai tribes were divided between Liu Kuren and the Tiefu chieftain, Liu Weichen. Daxi Dan refused to live under Liu Kuren, so he instead went to join the Tiefu. Even as the Tuoba revived their state as the Northern Wei, it would not be until 391, when the Wei destroyed the Tiefu, that Daxi Dan returned to the Tuoba along with Daxi Jin.

== Service under Emperor Daowu ==
Daxi Jin was described as intelligent and competent, so Emperor Daowu of Northern Wei assigned him and Baba Fei to command the imperial guards. Later, Daowu appointed Daxi Jin as a Palace Attendant, making him one of his closest confidants. In 396, Daxi Jin, serving as a Chief Clerk and Colonel of Striding Cavalry, brought the imperial guards to accompany Emperor Daowu in his campaign against the Later Yan. When the emperor returned north after occupying the Central Plains in 398, revolts broke out in the commanderies of Boling (博陵; in modern Hengshui, Hebei), Bohai and Zhangwu (章武; in modern-day Pingshu, Hebei). Daxi Jin and Tuoba Zun led their troops to suppress the upheaval.

In 399, Emperor Daowu led a northern expedition against the Tiele people. Daxi Jin was ordered to attack the Kudi and Youlian tribes, and he decisively defeated them at Taihunchuan (太渾川; southwest of present-day Datong, Shanxi). Subsequently, he attaked the Houmochen tribe, seizing over 100,000 livestock and pursuing the tribe all the way to Da'e Valley (大峨谷; location unknown), where he established garrisons before withdrawing. He was later transferred to Commissioner of Waterways before becoming General of the Jin Army and Inspector of You province. He was also granted the fiefly title of Marquis of Shanyang.

== Service under Emperor Mingyuan ==
In 409, after Emperor Mingyuan took the throne, he formed a council of eight officials, including Daxi Jin, Baba Song and Cui Hong, to sit at the Zhiche Gate (止車門) to discuss court affairs, and they were later dubbed by the people as the "Eight Sages" (八公). Afterwards, Daxi Jin was appointed as General of the Zheng Army and had him travel to the various provinces and commanderies to survey the issues of the locals.

In 410, a native of Zhangwu, Liu Ya (劉牙) led an uprising in his hometown, but Daxi Jin led his troops to quell them. The next year, while Emperor Mingyuan was visiting the old capital at Shengle, Daxi Jin was ordered to guard the contemporary capital, Pingcheng. Around this time, the Prince of Changli, Murong Bo'er (慕容伯兒) was plotting to rebel in the emperor's absence. Daxi Jin knew of his intentions, so he summoned Murong, interrogated him before forcing him to confess to his crimes. He then had Murong arrested and executed along with all his followers.

In 412, Daxi Jin was made Prime Minister of the Left. The following year, Emperor Mingyuan embarked on a western expedition, and Daxi Jin led the vanguard to attack the Yuezhen tribe at Mount Bana (跋那山; northeast of present-day Yulin, Shaanxi). Daxi Jin obtained around 50,000 horses and 200,000 cattles while also relocating more than 20,000 families from the Yuezhen to Daning (大寧; in present-day Zhangjiakou, Hebei). In 414, when the Rouran invaded Wei, Emperor Mingyuan counterattacked and defeated them. He instructed Daxi Jin to pursue the Rouran khan, Yujiulü Datan, but due to the extreme cold weather, a number of Daxi Jin's soldiers suffered from frostbite, with some losing their fingers and others freezing to death. Later, Daxi was appointed Daren of the Heavenly Division and granted the title of Duke of Shanyang.

=== Henan Campaign ===
In 422, when Emperor Mingyuan established Tuoba Tao as his Crown Prince, Daxi Jin, Baba Song and An Tong were all appointed as Assistants of the Left. That same year, Emperor Wu of the Liu Song dynasty died, so Emperor Mingyuan took the opportunity to launch a southern expedition. Daxi Jin was appointed as Minister of Works and given authority over the vanguard army, with Gongsun Biao and Pu Ji serving under his command. He was also appointed Senior General of the Jin Army and acting Inspector of Yang province.

Both Daxi Jin and Gongsun Biao proposed attacking the major Song cities head-on, while the minister, Cui Hao argued that they should be seizing the surrounding territory first to isolate these cities. Emperor Mingyuan sided with Daxi and Gongsun, and sent them to attack Huatai. However, Daxi failed to capture the city and had to request reinforcements. The emperor severely reprimanded him, but nonetheless led his troops to provide support from Zhongshan. Huatai eventually fell, and Daxishifted his focus to Hulao and Luoyang. Along the way, the Song commander at Hulao, Mao Dezu sent Zhai Guang (翟廣) and others to attack the Wei army, but Daxi Jin greatly routed them at Tuluo (土樓; northwest of present-day Yuanyang County, Henan) before laying siege to Hulao.

As Mao Dezu held firmly to Hulao for days, Daxi Jin decided to leave Gongsun Biao behind to guard their supply train while Daxi led a small force to pacify Yan and Yu provinces. The following year, Daxi Jin and the others rejoined Gongsun to besiege Hulao again. Though Mao continued to fiercely resist, Daxi Jin and his allies were able to regroup and intensify their assault. Daxi left Gongsun again, this time to lead a detachment in capturing Xuchang. When Gongsun was attacked by Mao Dezu, he rushed back from Xuchang to Hulao and inflicted a major defeat to the Song defenders. Mao was forced to retreat back into his city, and Daxi Jin soon received reinforcements from Yizhan Jian and Yilou Ba (伊樓拔). The reinforcements suffered heavy losses in the subsequent fighting, but finally, after eight months of siege, the Wei army captured Hulao. Not long after, Emperor Mingyuan died of illness, and Daxi Jin ordered his forces to withdraw.

== Service under Emperor Taiwu ==
When Tuoba Tao, posthumously known as Emperor Taiwu, ascended the throne, Daxi Jin's fiefly title was promoted to the Prince of Yicheng. In 425, Taiwu led a successul major offensive against the Rouran through three routes, with Daxi Jin leading the western route army out of Erhan Mountain (爾寒山; northwest of present-day Baotou, Inner Mongolia).

=== Campaign against Helian Xia and capture ===
In 426, Emperor Taiwu invaded the Helian Xia and sent Daxi Jin with 45,000 troops to attack Puban (蒲阪; in modern Yuncheng, Shanxi). The Xia commander at Puban, Helian Yidou (赫連乙斗) as well as the garrison commander at Chang'an, Helian Zhuxing (赫連助興) both abandoned their cities and fled, allowing Daxi Jin to easily occupy them. Daxi Jin then received the submission of all the Qiang and Di tribes in Qin and Yong provinces.

The following year, the Xia general, Helian Ding led his troops to recapture Chang'an. Daxi Jin was able to fight Helian to a stalemate, giving Emperor Taiwu the opportunity to carry out an attack on the Xia capital at Tongwan. The Xia emperor, Helian Chang, was defeated and fled to Shanggui. When news of the emperor's flight reached him, Helian Ding decided to withdraw and join him at Shanggui. Daxi Jin pursued Helian Ding all the way to Yongcheng (雍城; in present-day Fengxiang District, Baoji), but was unable to catch up, so he retreated back to Chang'an.

Not long after, Emperor Taiwu ordered his generals to withdraw their armies. However, Daxi Jin, believing that the Guanzhong region was still not secured with Helian Chang at Shanggui, refused and instead requested for reinforcements to destroy the Xia once and for all. Emperor Taiwu was compelled to grant his request, adding 10,000 soldiers and 3,000 horses to Daxi Jin's army while ordering E Qing, Qiudun Dui and others to remain in the Guanzhong to assist him. Daxi Jin sent Yuchi Juan to attack Shanggui, prompting Helian Chang to retreat to Pingliang.

Daxi Jin then advanced to Anding to link up with E Qing and the others. However, many of his horses suddenly fell ill and died, and his army also suffered from food shortage. Daxi decided to fortify his position and sent Qiu Dui to plunder military supplies from the local populace. Helian Chang capitalized on the situation by attacking Qiu Dui, greatly routing his army. Helian then led incessant attacks on the Wei forces, preventing their herders from leaving the city. With their forces in peril, Daxi Jin's subordinate, An Jie volunteered to fight the Xia army to the death. Daxi, fearing that the Xia cavalry will overrun their infantry, refused and insisted on waiting for cavalry reinforcements. In the end, An Jie secretly conspired Yu Juan to carry out their own attack, finally capturing Helian Chang in battle.

Despite this victory, Daxi Jin, embarrassed and wanting to claim credit of his own, ordered his troops to bring three days' worth of food to launch an assault on Pingliang, which was still defended by Helian Ding. He ignored E Qing's advice to advance along the water source and instead went ahead to cut off Helian Ding's escape route along the northern roads. Helian Ding knew that Daxi Jin's army had little food and water, so he sent his soldiers to intercept them from the front and rear. Daxi Jin's army suffered a total defeat; he along with E Qing, Liu Ba and others were captured, while around six or seven thousand Wei soldiers were killed.

=== Return to Northern Wei and later life ===
Daxi Jin remained in Xia captivity until 430, when the Wei amy recaptured Anding Commandery. Emperor Taiwu, angered by his failure, ordered Daxi Jin to kneel and offer wine to the general that found him, Dou Daitian (豆代田). To further humiliate him, Daxi was also demoted to a steward and was forced to serve food and wine on his way back to Pingcheng.

After his return, Daxi Jin was reintegrated as General Who Stabilises the East, though his peerage was reduced to Duke of Yicheng. In 432, when the Northern Wei launched an attack on Northern Yan, Daxi gathered the commoners of You province and the Dingling people of Miyun to transport siege weapons. In 435, he was appointed Minister of the Guards and Senior General Who Attacks the South and enfeoffed as the Prince of Hongnong. He was later transferred to Senior General of Ten Thousand Cavalry. In 439, he and more than thirty other ministers opposed Emperor Taiwu's plans to invade the Northern Liang. With support from Cui Hao, Emperor Taiwu went ahead with his plans and conquered Northern Liang that same year.

Even at his advanced age, Daxi Jin continued to manage criminal cases and political affairs, with Emperor Taiwu gifting him a carriage to accommodate him in his work. Daxi died at the age of 80 in 448. Taiwu personally attended his funeral and granted him the posthumous name of "Zhao". During the reign of Emperor Xiaowen (471–499), Daxi Jin's name was enshrined in the imperial ancestral temple.
