= Emperor Wulie =

Emperor Wulie may refer to:

- Sun Jian (155–191), warlord whose son Sun Quan founded the Eastern Wu dynasty
- Helian Bobo (381–425), founding emperor of the Hu Xia dynasty
- Li Yuanhao (1003–1048), founding emperor of the Western Xia dynasty
