= Princess Shiping =

Chinese princess

Princess Shiping 始平公主
- Died: After 428 CE
- Spouse: Helian Chang of Xia
- Father: Emperor Mingyuan of Northern Wei

Princess Shiping (Chinese: 始平公主; pinyin: Shǐ píng gōngzhǔ, fl. 428 CE) was a Chinese princess from the house of Northern Wei. She married Helian Chang, emperor of the Xia dynasty during the Sixteen Kingdoms period in northern China.

She was the daughter of Emperor Mingyuan of Northern Wei. After the latter captured the state of Xia, instead of killing its emperor, Helian Chang, he gave him his daughter to marry in 428 CE, along with the western palace as his residence, with supplies fitting an emperor, and the title of Duke of Kuaiji.
