= Consort Yao =

- Princess Xiping of Qin
- Died: 420
- Spouse: Emperor Mingyuan of Northern Wei (m. 415)
Posthumous name
- Empress Zhaoai 昭哀皇后 "the accomplished and lamentable empress"
- Father: Emperor Wenhuan of Qin

Consort Yao (姚夫人, personal name unknown) (died 420), who was initially Princess Xiping (西平公主) of the Qiang-led Later Qin dynasty, posthumously honored as Empress Zhaoai (昭哀皇后, literally "the accomplished and lamentable empress"), was the wife of Emperor Mingyuan of the Xianbei-led Northern Wei dynasty (Tuoba Si).

== Biography ==
Princess Xiping was the daughter of Yao Xing (Emperor Wenhuan of Later Qin). It is not known when exactly her marriage to the emperor of Northern Wei was negotiated, but they married in 415. When she arrived at the Northern Wei capital of Pingcheng (平城, in modern Datong, Shanxi), Emperor Mingyuan welcomed her with a great ceremony due an empress. However, Northern Wei customs dictated that only a candidate who was able to complete a golden statue with her own hands could become an empress, and Princess Xiping was unable to do so. She was therefore only made an imperial consort, not an empress, although within the palace she was treated as Emperor Mingyuan's wife and an empress. Later, Emperor Mingyuan offered to make her an empress, but she declined.

In 416, as Later Qin came under attack by the Jin general, Liu Yu, Emperor Mingyuan considered dispatching troops to attack Liu Yu's flank, in order to save Later Qin (then ruled by Consort Yao's brother, Yao Hong), an idea that many of his officials supported based on the marital relationships and their nagging suspicions that Liu Yu intended to attack Northern Wei as well. But after advice from the official, Cui Hao, whose opinions Emperor Mingyuan respected, he called off the campaign, and except for minor skirmishes near the Yellow River, Liu Yu's campaign against Later Qin went unimpeded by Northern Wei forces, and Later Qin fell in 417. Emperor Mingyuan did then issue a decree that anyone who was able to rescue members of the Later Qin's imperial household and deliver them to Pingcheng would be greatly rewarded, and a number of Later Qin officials also surrendered their domains to Northern Wei.

In 420, Consort Yao died. Regretting that he had never made her empress, Emperor Mingyuan buried her with honors due an empress, including a burial with an empress' seal, and posthumously honored her as Empress Zhaoai.
