= Emperor Taiwu of Northern Wei =

Emperor Taiwu of Northern Wei 北魏太武帝

Emperor of Northern Wei
- Reign: December 27, 423 – March 11, 452
- Predecessor: Emperor Mingyuan
- Successor: Tuoba Yu
- Born: 408
- Died: March 11, 452
- Burial: Jin Mausoleum of Yunzhong (雲中金陵)
- Consorts: Empress Taiwu; Empress Jing'ai; Lu Zuo Zhaoyi
- Issue: Tuoba Huang; Tuoba Fuluo; Tuoba Han; Tuoba Tan; Tuoba Jian; Tuoba Yu; Princess Shanggu
Full name
- Family name: Tuòbá (拓跋); Given name: Tāo (燾)
Era dates
- Shǐguāng (始光) 424–428; Shénjiā (神䴥) 428–431; Yánhé (延和) 432–434; Tàiyán (太延) 435–440; Tàipíngzhēnjūn (太平真君) 440–451; Zhèngpíng (正平) 451–452
Posthumous name
- Emperor Tàiwǔ (太武皇帝) ("grand and martial emperor")
Temple name
- Shìzǔ (世祖)
- House: Tuoba
- Dynasty: Northern Wei
- Father: Emperor Mingyuan
- Mother: Empress Mi
- Religion: Taoism

Emperor Taiwu of Northern Wei ((北)魏太武帝, 408 – 11 March 452), personal name Tuoba Tao (拓跋燾), Xianbei name Büri (佛貍), was the third emperor of China's Northern Wei dynasty. He was generally regarded as a capable ruler, and during his reign, the Northern Wei roughly doubled in size and unified all of northern China, thus ending the Sixteen Kingdoms period and, together with the southern dynasty Liu Song, starting the Southern and Northern Dynasties period of Chinese history. He was a devout Taoist, under the influence of his prime minister Cui Hao, and in 444, at Cui Hao's suggestion and believing that Buddhists had supported the rebellion of Gai Wu (蓋吳), he ordered the abolition of Buddhism, at the penalty of death. This was the first of the Three Disasters of Wu for Chinese Buddhism. Late in his reign, his reign began to be cruel, and his people were also worn out by his incessant wars against the Liu Song dynasty. In 452, he was assassinated by his eunuch Zong Ai, who put his son Tuoba Yu on the throne but then assassinated Tuoba Yu as well. The other officials overthrew Zong and put Emperor Taiwu's grandson Tuoba Jun (son of Tuoba Huang the Crown Prince, who predeceased him).

== Early life ==
Tuoba Tao was born in 408, while his father Tuoba Si was still the Prince of Qi under his grandfather, Emperor Daowu, without having officially been made crown prince but was the heir presumptive, as the oldest and most favored son of Emperor Daowu. (Tuoba Tao's mother was later referred to in history as Consort Du (杜貴嬪), but was likely actually named Duguhun, as by the time that Wei Shu (the official history of Northern Wei) was written, the Duguhuns had their name changed to Du by Emperor Xiaowen.) He was Tuoba Si's oldest son. After Tuoba Si became emperor in 409 (as Emperor Mingyuan) following Emperor Daowu's assassination by his son Tuoba Shao (拓跋紹) the Prince of Qinghe, Tuoba Tao was assumed to be the eventual heir, but not given that title for a while. In Tuoba Tao's childhood, he was given the nickname Foli. Tuoba Tao appears to have been separated from his mother Consort Du from a young age for an unknown reason, and was raised by his wet nurse Lady Dou instead. When Tuoba Tao knew about the situation regarding his mother, he became very mournful, which earned him the praise of his father Emperor Mingyuan. In 420, Consort Du died. (The Book of Southern Qi, compiled by the later Liang dynasty, recorded that Consort Du was killed due to the Northern Wei custom of killing the mother of the crown prince. However, this appears unlikely, as Consort Du died two years before Tuoba Tao became crown prince, and the Book of Wei and Book of Song do not record her cause of death).

In 422, Emperor Mingyuan created Tuoba Tao the Prince of Taiping. Later that year, when he suffered a major illness, at Cui Hao's suggestion, he not only created Tuoba Tao crown prince, but further had Crown Prince Tao take the throne to serve as the secondary emperor. He commissioned his key advisors Baba Song (拔拔嵩), Cui, Daxi Jin, An Tong (安同), Qiumuling Guan (丘穆陵觀), and Qiudun Dui (丘敦堆) to serve as the Crown Prince's advisor. From this point on, most matters, particularly domestic matters, were ruled on by Crown Prince Tao, while Emperor Mingyuan himself only ruled on important matters. Later that year, when Emperor Mingyuan led a major attack on rival Liu Song, Tuoba Tao headed north to guard against a possible Rouran attack.

In 423, soon after capturing most of modern Henan from Liu Song, Emperor Mingyuan died. Tuoba Tao succeeded to the throne as Emperor Taiwu.

== Early reign ==
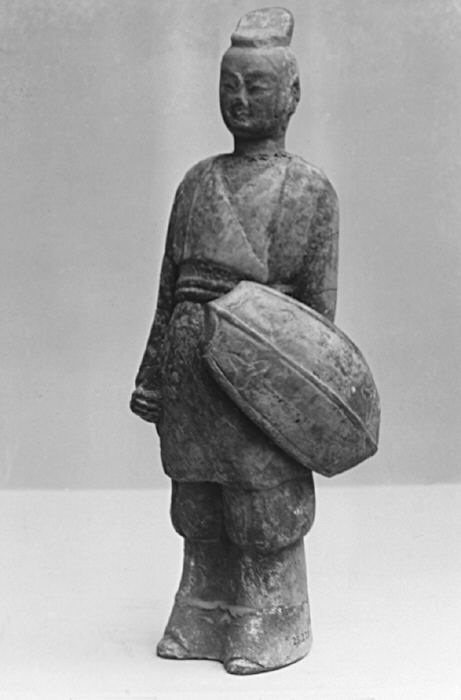
Northern Wei soldier figurine holding a shield

Almost immediately after Emperor Taiwu took the throne, Rouran attacked after its Mouhanheshenggai Khan, Yujiulü Datan heard about Emperor Mingyuan's death. Emperor Taiwu engaged Rouran troops, and on the very first engagement became surrounded by Rouran troops, but he fought his way out of danger, and subsequently, he made nearly yearly attacks against Rouran, and each year, Rouran forces would elude him by retreating north, only to return south after he withdrew. Meanwhile, in 425, he reestablished peaceful relations with Liu Song. He also, in an action that later became a Northern Wei tradition, honored his wet nurse Lady Dou as "nurse empress dowager".

Also, soon after he took the throne, Emperor Taiwu became a devout Taoist. It was around this time that the Taoist Kou Qianzhi became famed, and Cui Hao became Kou's follower and often praised Kou before Emperor Taiwu. Emperor Taiwu was pleased by prophecies that Kou was making, which implied that he was divine in origin, and he officially endorsed Kou's proselytization of his state.

In 426, after receiving a memorial from the eunuch Chou Luoqi (仇洛齊), Emperor Taiwu carried out a reform of the household registration, as previously, Emperor Daowu had sought out unregistered households by shipping silk to them, and although these households responded to the call, they were not properly assigned to the registers of local tax-collecting officials. As a result, Northern Wei lacked a sufficient taxpaying population, leading to greater demand on those who did pay tax and provide labour. Emperor Taiwu properly assigned the unregistered households to local tax registers, solving the issue.

Also in 426, Emperor Taiwu began to look for a target to make a concentrated attack—asking his officials for their opinions on whom to attack between Xia and Rouran, and his officials were divided in their opinions, and some proposed yet another third target, Northern Yan, although after the death of the Xia emperor Helian Bobo later that year, he settled on making Xia his target. When Baba Song opposed this, Emperor Taiwu showed his fierce temper by having his guards pound Baba's head on the floor, but he also showed how quickly that temper went away by not demoting Baba. He then sent Daxi Jin to attack Puban (蒲阪, in modern Yuncheng, Shanxi) and Pu Ji (普幾) to attack Shancheng (陝城, in modern Sanmenxia, Henan), while himself making a fast, cavalry-based attack on the Xia's heavily fortified capital Tongwan (統萬, in modern Yulin, Shaanxi). Catching the Xia emperor Helian Chang by surprise, the Northern Wei troops intruded into Tongwan before withdrawing with much loot, while in the south, Helian Chang's generals Helian Yidou (赫連乙斗) and Helian Zhuxing (赫連助興) abandoned not only Puban, but also Chang'an, allowing Daxi to occupy the Guanzhong region. In spring 427, Helian Chang sent his brother Helian Ding south to try to recapture Chang'an, but Helian Ding's forces became stalemated with Daxi's. In response, Emperor Taiwu made another attack on Tongwan. Helian Chang initially took Helian Ding's suggestion to try to defend Tongwan until he could defeat Daxi, but misinformation that Helian Chang received then induced him to come out of Tongwan to engage Northern Wei forces. Emperor Taiwu defeated him in battle, causing him to be unable to return to Tongwan and forcing him to flee to Shanggui (上邽, in modern Tianshui, Gansu), allowing Emperor Taiwu to capture Tongwan. In the start of what would be a string of marriages that could be characterized as either politically- or trophy-taking-related, he took three of Helian Bobo's daughters as his concubines. Upon hearing of Tongwan's fall, Helian Ding disengaged from Daxi and joined Helian Chang at Shanggui as well.

In 428, Daxi and Qiudun Dui, trying to capture Helian Chang, instead became trapped by Helian Chang in the city of Anding (安定, in modern Pingliang, Gansu). However, Daxi's subordinates Yuchi Juan (尉遲眷) and Anchi Jia (安遲頡) made a surprise attack and captured Helian Chang. Helian Ding took over as the emperor of Xia. Meanwhile, Emperor Taiwu treated Helian Chang as an honored guest, supplying Helian Chang with the same supplies that he himself used, and he married his sister Princess Shiping to Helian Chang and created him the Duke of Kuaiji; he also rewarded Yuchi and Anchi greatly and created them dukes. Subsequently, Daxi, humiliated that his subordinates captured Helian Chang and he himself appeared helpless, aggressively pursued Helian Ding, but instead was defeated and captured by Helian Ding. In fear, Qiudun and Tuoba Li (拓跋禮) the Prince of Gaoliang abandoned Chang'an as well and fled to Puban, allowing Xia to recapture Chang'an. In anger, although Qiudun had been a high-level official for him since the days that he was crown prince, he had Anchi execute Qiudun and take over his position. For the time being, Emperor Taiwu left Helian Ding alone, while preparing an assault on Rouran instead, since Rouran had been harassing the northern border region.

In light of the Xia campaign, the historian Sima Guang wrote this commentary about Emperor Taiwu, in his Zizhi Tongjian:

The emperor of Wei was strong and brave, and calm and settled. Regardless of whether it came to defending a city or fighting on the battlefield, he was always at the frontline. His guards might suffer casualties, but his expressions would be the same, and therefore his generals and soldiers were all fearful of and impressed by him, and willing to fight hard to their death. He was also frugal, and he was satisfied with his clothing and food as long as they were sufficient. When his officials requested to strengthen the defenses of the capital and remodel the palace, arguing that I Ching said, "Princes and dukes establish defenses to secure their home and states," and that Xiao He said, "An emperor may be at home throughout his empire, but if his home were not sufficiently grand and luxurious, he could not show his strength," he responded, "The ancient also said, 'What counts is grace, not secure defenses.' Helian Bobo used boiled earth to build his city, and I destroyed his state; it was not because it was not secure enough. Right now, the land is not in peace, and we need human power, and I loathe construction projects. What Xiao He said was incorrect." He also felt that money was the capital for affairs of the military and the state, and should not be easily wasted. He issued monetary awards only to the families of those who had died for the state or who had contributed greatly, never to his own relatives. When he sent generals out, he always personally advised them, and those who disobeyed his advice usually ended in failure. He was also a good judge of character, and was able to select generals from among soldiers, and he only commissioned officials who were capable, not those who were well-connected. He was sharp in his observations and could see hidden things, and his subjects could not deceive him. He awarded those of humble ranks if they deserved them, and he punished those of high ranks if they deserved them. He also did not protect those whom he usually favored, and often said, "I, along with the people, obey the laws, and how do I dare to view them lightly?" However, he was cruel and often punished by execution, and he often regretted executions deeply.

In 429, with only Cui Hao in support and most other officials opposing, Emperor Taiwu launched a major attack on Rouran. (The officials who opposed largely worried that Emperor Wen of Liu Song, who had for years wanted to regain the provinces south of the Yellow River that Emperor Mingyuan captured in 422 and 423, would attack.) Emperor Taiwu pointed out that even if Liu Song could attack, it became even more crucial to defeat Rouran first, lest that Rouran attacked at the same time that Liu Song did. He surprised Yujiulü Datan, whose people scattered, forcing him to flee. However, as he chased Yujiulü Datan, he himself became hesitant to advance further, and he withdrew. Only later did he hear that he was in fact very close to Yujiulü Datan's position and could have captured the Rouran khan had he chased further, and he regretted his withdrawal. On the way back, he also attacked Gaoche tribes, and along with the Rouran tribes that he captured, he resettled them south of the Gobi Desert and had them exercise agriculture. Due to this, livestock and leather became so abundant that they could be bought cheaply by Northern Wei's populace. He greatly rewarded Cui, and from this point Cui's advice became what he accepted at all times.

In spring 430, Liu Song launched a major attack, and Emperor Taiwu, judging his own defenses south of the Yellow River to be unable to withstand a Liu Song attack, withdrew them north, judging correctly that Liu Song forces would stop at the Yellow River, planning to counterattack in the winter after the river froze. Meanwhile, hearing that Liu Song and Xia had subsequently entered into a treaty to attack him and divide Northern Wei lands, he judged correctly that despite the treaty Liu Song had no intention to cross the Yellow River north, and he decided to destroy Xia once and for all. In fall 430, he made a surprise attack on the new Xia capital Pingliang (平涼, also in modern Pingliang), while Helian Ding was engaging Western Qin's prince Qifu Mumo, putting Pingliang under siege, but although he then sent Helian Chang to Pingliang to try to persuade its defender, Helian Shegan (赫連社干, younger brother to both Helian Chang and Helian Ding), to surrender, Pingliang would not fall quickly. However, the Northern Wei general Tuxi Bi (吐奚弼) engaged Helian Ding as Helian Ding was trying to relieve Pingliang, defeating him and surrounding him at the Chungu Plains (鶉觚原, in modern Pingliang). Northern Wei forces surrounded him, and his army became hungry and thirsty. After several days, he forcibly fought his way out of the siege, but his forces mostly collapsed, and he himself was badly injured. He gathered the remaining forces and fled to Shanggui. Around the new year 431, Helian Shegan surrendered. Nearly all former Xia territory was now in Northern Wei hands. (Upon recovering Daxi Jin from Xia captivity, Emperor Taiwu punished him for his failures by temporarily making him the imperial porter in charge of serving meals, but soon pardoned him and restored him to his princely title.) (By 432, Helian Ding was no longer able to hold Shanggui, and he, after destroying Qifu Mumo's Western Qin, tried to head west to attack Northern Liang, but was intercepted by the khan of Tuyuhun, Murong Mugui (慕容慕璝), defeated, and captured. In 433, Murong Mugui, with promises of rewards, turned Helian Ding over to Emperor Taiwu, and he had Helian Ding executed.)

While Emperor Taiwu was on his Xia campaign, he ordered his generals, Yizhan Jian and Zhangsun Daosheng to cross the Yellow River when it froze in winter 430. They quickly recaptured Luoyang and Hulao, soon forcing the retreat of the main Liu Song force, under the command of the Liu Song general Dao Yanzhi, and trapped the remaining Liu Song troops at Huatai (滑台, in modern Anyang, Henan). A relief mission by the Liu Song general Tan Daoji could not reach Huatai after Yizhan managed to cut off his supply routes, and by spring 431, Huatai fell. All the lands lost to Liu Song a year earlier had been regained. (Emperor Taiwu, in another action typical of him, rewarded the Liu Song general Zhu Xiuzhi (朱脩之), who had held Huatai for months faithfully, by giving him a daughter of an imperial clan member in marriage.)

Emperor Taiwu granted the soldiers who partook in these campaigns a ten-year exemption from taxes and government service. He also granted the conquered people of Xia a seven-year exemption from taxes and government service in order to appease them. These were part of a larger series of amnesties and tax exemptions Emperor Taiwu gave in order to try to relieve the burden of frequent warfare, however by the end of his reign these exemptions appear to have only had limited effect in doing so.

In summer 431, Emperor Taiwu made his first proposal of a marriage between the two imperial families to Liu Song. (Based on subsequent events, it appeared to be a proposal of marriage between a son of his and a daughter of Emperor Wen's, but by this point it was not completely clear.) Emperor Wen responded to it ambiguously. From this point on, Emperor Taiwu would repropose the marriage on a nearly yearly basis, with the same kind of response from Emperor Wen. At the same time, however, he did enter into peaceful relations with Rouran, by returning a number of captured Rouran generals.

Late in 431, Emperor Taiwu commissioned Cui Hao to revise the Northern Wei legal code, which had not had a major revision since 398-9 during Emperor Daowu's reign. The new legal code appeared to be more lenient than the older one, with four-year and five-year imprisonment terms replaced with one-year terms, and allowed officials to be punished by being demoted in rank instead of the prescribed punishment. However, it was also from this point that officials became known for their rampant corruption in seeking wealth.

== Middle reign ==
In spring 432, Emperor Taiwu honored his wet nurse, Nurse Empress Dowager Dou, empress dowager. He also created one of Helian Bobo's daughters as his empress, and his oldest son Tuoba Huang, by his deceased concubine Consort Helan, crown prince.

In summer 432, Emperor Taiwu, with Xia destroyed, began to attack Northern Yan in earnest. By fall 432, he had put Northern Yan's capital Helong (和龍, in modern Jinzhou, Liaoning) under siege. While he had several victories over Northern Yan forces, he chose to withdraw at the start of winter, after seizing a large number of Northern Yan's people and forcibly resettling them in his own state. For the next few years, he would launch yearly attacks against Northern Yan with the same pattern—seeking to weaken Northern Yan gradually. While Emperor Taiwu was concentrating on Northern Yan, he also had Northern Liang on his mind, but at the advice of his minister Li Shun (李順), he decided to wait until Northern Liang's long-time prince, Juqu Mengxun, died.

In winter 432, the Northern Yan emperor Feng Hong's son Feng Chong (馮崇), who had feared that his father would put him to death because of false accusations by his stepmother Princess Murong, surrendered the important Northern Yan city of Liaoxi (遼西, in modern Tangshan, Hebei) to Northern Wei. To reward Feng Chong, Emperor Taiwu not only sent his brother Tuoba Jian (拓跋健) the Prince of Yongchang to save Feng Chong from his father's siege, but created him the Prince of Liaoxi with 10 commanderies as his fief.

In 433, Juqu Mengxun died, and Emperor Taiwu began to consider conquering Northern Liang. Still, initially, he continued to accept Juqu Mengxun's son Juqu Mujian as a vassal, and he took Juqu Mujian's sister as an imperial consort.

In spring 434, Helian Chang, for reasons lost to history, fled out of Pingcheng and apparently tried to start a rebellion. He was killed in battle, and Emperor Taiwu had Helian Chang's brothers put to death.

Also in spring 434, after initially refusing a peace offer from Northern Yan, Emperor Taiwu accepted after Feng Hong made an offer to give his daughter to Emperor Taiwu as a consort and returned the detained Northern Wei ambassador Huniuyu Shimen (忽忸于什門), who had been imprisoned by Feng Hong's brother and predecessor Feng Ba in 414 after being commissioned by Emperor Mingyuan. Emperor Taiwu, however, ordered Feng Hong to also send his crown prince Feng Wangren (馮王仁) to Pingcheng to meet him, and Feng Hong refused, ending the brief peace, and by summer 434, Northern Wei resumed its periodic attacks on Northern Yan. Meanwhile, around this time, he also took the sister of Rouran Chilian Khan Yujiulü Wuti, Lu Zuo Zhaoyi, as an imperial consort and married his sister or cousin Princess Xihai to Yujiulü Wuti, to further cement the peaceful relations.

In fall 434, while attacking the Xiongnu rebel Bai Long (白龍), Emperor Taiwu took Bai's forces lightly, and was nearly captured in an ambush, saved only by the efforts of his guard Houmochen Jian (侯莫陳建). He subsequently defeated Bai and slaughtered Bai's tribe.

In 436, Feng Hong sent another embassy, offering to send Feng Wangren as a hostage. Emperor Taiwu, not believing in Feng Hong's offer, refused, and prepared a final assault. When he arrived at Helong, however, Feng Hong had already requested assistance from Goguryeo, which sent troops to assist Feng Hong's plans of relocating his people to Goguryeo soil, and because Emperor Taiwu's general Tuxi Bi was drunk, the Northern Wei forces could not give chase, and in anger, Emperor Taiwu imprisoned and then demoted both Tuxi and his deputy, the general E Qing (娥清) to being common soldiers, although he subsequently made them generals again. He then sent messengers to Goguryeo, demanding that Goguryeo turn Feng Hong over. Goguryeo's King Jangsu refused, albeit humbly requesting to serve Emperor Taiwu together with Feng Hong. Emperor Taiwu, at the suggestion of his brother Tuoba Pi (拓跋丕) the Prince of Leping, did not immediately carry out a campaign against Goguryeo. (By 438, however, Feng Hong and Goguryeo would have a fall out, and King Jangsu would have Feng Hong executed.)

In late 436, the peaceful relations that Northern Wei had with Rouran since 431 ended, for reasons no longer known. Rouran continued its harassment of Northern Wei's northern border regions.

In 437, the marriage negotiations that Emperor Taiwu had with Liu Song's Emperor Wen appeared to reach some fruition, as Emperor Wen sent his official Liu Xibo (劉熙伯) to Northern Wei to discuss details of how one of his daughters would be married into the Northern Wei imperial household, but at this time, Emperor Wen's daughter died, and the negotiations ended.

Also in 437, exasperated by the rampant corruption that his local officials were engaging in (which was somewhat necessary for them because at this point, no Northern Wei officials received a salary), he issued an edict creating incentives for low-level officials and commoners to report officials for corruption. However, the edict did not have its calculated effect, as the people who had evidence of the officials' corruption instead used the knowledge to blackmail the officials, and the officials continued to be corrupt.

Later in 437, Emperor Taiwu married his sister Princess Wuwei to Juqu Mujian, and Juqu Mujian sent his heir apparent Juqu Fengtan (沮渠封壇) to Pingcheng to be a hostage. Despite this, he continued to consider conquering Northern Liang, but at Li Shun's urging, delayed it.

In 438, Emperor Taiwu launched a major attack on Rouran, but Rouran forces largely eluded his, and he made little gain.

In 439, aggravated that Juqu Mujian's sister and sister-in-law Lady Li (with whom Juqu Mujian was having an affair) had tried to poison Princess Wuwei, and also unhappy that Juqu Mujian had friendly relations with Rouran, decided to launch a major attack on Northern Liang. Li Shun, who had previously advised him to attack Northern Liang, by this point had somehow switched positions and, along with Tuxi Bi, opposed such military actions, stating falsely that there was so little water and grass for grazing in Northern Liang that Northern Wei troops would suffer from thirst and hunger. At Cui Hao's insistence, however, Emperor Taiwu believed that he could conquer Northern Liang, and he launched the campaign. He quickly reached the Northern Liang capital Guzang (姑臧, in modern Wuwei, Gansu) in the fall, capturing it after a short siege. Meanwhile, Yujiulü Wuti had launched a surprise attack on Pingcheng to try to save Northern Liang, but was repelled. (Cui Hao, who was a political enemy of Li Shun's, would attribute Li's switch in position to bribes by Juqu Mujian, and later Emperor Taiwu would force Li to commit suicide.) Northern Liang territory was largely in Northern Wei's control, and although both Juqu Mujian's brother Juqu Wuhui and Tufa Baozhou (禿髮保周), a son of Southern Liang's last prince Tufa Rutan, would try to hold various parts of Northern Liang territory, by 440 Tufa Baozhou would be dead by suicide after failures, and by 441 Juqu Wuhui had fled to Gaochang. Northern China was now united under Emperor Taiwu's reign, ending the Sixteen Kingdoms era and starting the Southern and Northern Dynasties era. He continued to treat Juqu Mujian as a brother-in-law, and Juqu Mujian was allowed to continue carry the title of Prince of Hexi.

Previously in Northern Wei, because the state frequently entered wars, military prowess was the prevailing value in Northern Wei society, and most aristocrats did not care for scholarly pursuits. After the conquest of Northern Liang, the scholar Chang Shuang (常爽) established an academy and attracted students. Only after this did scholarship start to become popular in Northern Wei. Also at this time, on the advice of the official Gao Yun, Emperor Taiwu removed all seals on fertile land and granted the land to use for agriculture, as by 439, much of this land had been sealed off, making it difficult for people in the capital region to find land to work.

== Late reign ==
In 442, at Kou Qianzhi's urging, Emperor Taiwu ascended a platform and formally received Taoist amulets from Kou, and changed the color of his flags to blue, to show his Taoist beliefs and to officially approve Taoism as the state religion. From that point on, it became a tradition for Northern Wei emperors, when they took the throne, to receive Taoist amulets. Also at Kou and Cui Hao's urging, he started building Jinglun Palace (靜輪宮), intended to be so high that it would be quiet and close to the gods. (Crown Prince Huang, a Buddhist, opposed the construction project on the basis of cost - and the project did appear to be a major drain on the treasury, but Emperor Taiwu disagreed with him.)

An anti Buddhist plan was concocted by the Celestial Masters under Kou Qianzhi along with Cui Hao under the Taiwu Emperor. The Celestial Masters of the north urged the persecution of Buddhists under the Taiwu Emperor in the Northern Wei, attacking Buddhism and the Buddha as wicked and as anti stability and anti family. Anti Buddhism was the position of Kou Qianzhi. There was no ban on the Celestial Masters despite the nofullfilment of Cui Hao and Kou Qianzhi's agenda in their anti Buddhist campaign.

In fall 443, while attacking Rouran, Emperor Taiwu suddenly encountered Yujiulü Wuti, and Crown Prince Huang, who was with him, advised an immediate attack, but Emperor Taiwu hesitated, allowing Yujiulü Wuti to escape. From that point on, Emperor Taiwu began to listen to Crown Prince Huang's advice in earnest, and in winter 443, he authorized Crown Prince Huang to carry out all imperial duties except the most important ones, under assistance from Qiumuling Shou (丘穆陵壽), Cui, Zhang Li (張黎), and Tuxi Bi. Crown Prince Huang soon instituted a policy to encourage farming—by mandatorily requiring those who had extra cattle to loan them to those without, to be animals of burden, with the lease being paid for by those without cattle by tilling the grounds of the cattle owners, increasing the efficiency of the farmlands greatly.

In 444, the first major incident of much political infighting during Emperor Taiwu's late reign occurred. Dugu Jie (獨孤絜), a high-level official, who had opposed attacking Rouran, was accused by Cui Hao of being so jealous of Cui, whose suggestions of attacking Rouran were accepted by Emperor Taiwu, that he sabotaged Emperor Taiwu's war efforts by giving the generals the wrong times for rendezvous, and then further planning to have Emperor Taiwu captured by Rouran and then making Emperor Taiwu's brother Tuoba Pi emperor. Emperor Taiwu put Dugu to death, and Tuoba Pi died from anxiety. Further, because Dugu implicated them while being interrogated, fellow officials Zhang Song (張嵩) and Kudi Lin (庫狄鄰) were also put to death.

In summer 444, eight nephews of the Tuyuhun khan Murong Muliyan (慕容慕利延), after their brother Murong Weishi (慕容緯世) had been put to death by their uncle, surrendered to Northern Wei and suggested that he attack Tuyuhun. In response, Emperor Taiwu sent his son Tuoba Fuluo (拓跋伏羅) the Prince of Jin to attack Tuyuhun and defeated Tuyuhun forces, forcing Murong Muliyan to flee into the Bailan Mountains (白蘭山, in modern southwestern Qinghai). In 445, with Emperor Taiwu's distant cousin Tuoba Na (拓跋那) the Prince of Gaoliang in pursuit, Murong Muliyan fled west and occupied Yutian (Khotan). (However, after a few years, Tuyuhun would return to its original position.)

In 445, angry that Zhenda (真達), the king of Shanshan had refused Emperor Taiwu's messengers passage through Shanshan to other Xiyu kingdoms, Emperor Taiwu sent his general Tuwan Dugui (吐萬度歸) to attack Shanshan, and by fall 445 Zhenda had surrendered. Northern Wei occupied Shanshan.

In fall 445, responding to prophecies that "Wu" would destroy Wei, a Lushuihu man, Gai Wu, started an uprising against Northern Wei at Xingcheng (杏城, in modern Yan'an, Shaanxi), and he was quickly joined by a large number of other "Hu" and Han people. Gai also submitted as a vassal to Liu Song, seeking Liu Song aid. Initial attempts by local officials to stamp out Gai's rebellion failed, and Gai became stronger and stronger, claiming the title of Prince of Tiantai. In spring 446, Emperor Taiwu personally attacked and defeated Gai's ally, the Han rebel Xue Yongzong (薛永宗), before facing Gai. Gai fled into the mountains, and Emperor Taiwu carried out harsh reprisals against those who had supported Gai, slaughtering them without mercy. After Emperor Taiwu reached Chang'an, he found a number of Buddhist temples with weapons in them, and he believed that the monks must be working with Gai, so he slaughtered the monks in Chang'an. Cui used this opportunity to encourage Emperor Taiwu to slaughter all monks throughout the empire and destroy the temples, statues, and sutras, and notwithstanding Kou's opposition, Emperor Taiwu proceeded to slaughter the monks in Chang'an, destroy the statues, and burn the sutras. He then issued an empire-wide prohibition of Buddhism. Crown Prince Huang, however, used delaying tactics in promulgating the edict, allowing Buddhists to flee or hide, but it was said that not a single Buddhist temple remained standing in Northern Wei. This was the first of the Three Disasters of Wu.

In spring 446, believing incorrectly that the Liu Song governor of Qing Province (青州, modern central and eastern Shandong), Du Ji (杜驥), was about to defect to him, Emperor Taiwu sent Tuoba Na and Tuoba Ren (拓跋仁, Tuoba Jian's son) the Prince of Yongchang to try to escort Du, and to attack Liu Song's Qing, Yan (兗州, modern western Shandong) and Ji (冀州, modern northwestern Shandong) Provinces, and while Northern Wei forces did not capture or hold those provinces, those provinces were greatly disturbed by the attack.

In summer 446, Gai returned to Xingcheng and restrengthened himself quickly. Emperor Taiwu sent Tuoba Na and Tuoba Ren to attack him, and Tuoba Na captured Gai's two uncles. Initially, Gai's uncles were to be delivered to Pingcheng, but the general Buliugu Qi (步六孤俟) suggested instead to make an oath with Gai's uncles and have them assassinate Gai. Tuoba Na agreed, and Gai's uncles assassinated him, ending Gai's rebellion.

Also in 446, Emperor Taiwu began a major construction project, conscripting 100,000 labourers from four provinces to build a large enclosing wall around the capital of Pingcheng to fortify it against Rouran attacks. However, Emperor Taiwu would end the project in 448 after a major famine in several provinces.

In 447, believing that Juqu Mujian had secretly hidden Northern Liang treasures that he had claimed to be lost to pillaging troops, Emperor Taiwu first slaughtered nearly the entire Juqu clan, and then forced Juqu Mujian and Consort Juqu to commit suicide.

In 448, Emperor Taiwu created his general Chudahan Ba (出大汗拔) the Prince of Shanshan, effectively making Shanshan a part of his empire. He also had Tuwan Dugui attack a number of other Xiyu kingdoms, forcing their submission.

In autumn 448, Emperor Taiwu ordered that all central and regional armies enforce martial law. In winter of that year, because Emperor Taiwu considered the wedding and funerals of the time to be overly extravagant, he ordered that officials establish limits on the rites of these events.

In winter 448 and spring 449, Emperor Taiwu and Crown Prince Huang attacked Rouran together, but Rouran's Chuluo Khan, Yujiulü Tuhezhen eluded them and did not engage them. In fall 449, however, Tuoba Na was able to inflict heavy losses on Rouran, and for several years Rouran did not attack.

In 450, Emperor Taiwu, accusing Liu Song's Emperor Wen of having fostered Gai's rebellion, attacked Liu Song, putting Xuanhu (懸瓠, in modern Zhumadian, Henan) under siege for 42 days but could not capture it, and he withdrew.

Later in 450, a major political mystery occurred in Northern Wei—for reasons not completely clear now, Emperor Taiwu had Cui Hao put to death, along with his particular cadet branch of his clan and any other person named Cui from Cui's home commandery of Qinghe (清河, roughly modern Xingtai, Hebei), as well as the cadet branches of several other clans with marital relations to Cui's. The publicly announced reason was that Cui had unduly revealed imperial infamy, when he wrote and published an official history, but what Cui did was never fully stated. The modern historian Bo Yang speculated that Cui had revealed that Emperor Taiwu's grandfather Emperor Daowu had been a traitor, and also that Cui was then in a major political confrontation with Crown Prince Huang, who manufactured part of the charges against Cui. (See here for details.) However, Bo's speculation, while having some evidentiary support, is not close to being conclusively shown, and why Emperor Taiwu suddenly so rashly and so severely punished the man that he had trusted for decades is fairly unclear. (It should be further noted that during the entire incident, Cui was described as being so fearful that he could not speak a single word, which appeared highly inconsistent with Cui's personality and character, suggesting that Cui had himself been poisoned; it should be further noted that immediately after executing Cui, Emperor Taiwu expressed regret of having done so.)

In fall 450, Liu Song's Emperor Wen launched a major attack on Northern Wei, again hoping to regain the provinces south of the Yellow River, making a two-pronged attack—with the eastern prong attacking Qiaoao (碻磝, in modern Liaocheng, Shandong) and Huatai, and the western prong attacking Shancheng and Tong Pass. Under Emperor Taiwu's orders, Northern Wei forces abandoned Qiaoao while defending Huatai, and he himself headed south to relieve Qiaoao while having Crown Prince Huang head north to defend against a potential Rouran attack. The Liu Song general Wang Xuanmo (王玄謨), whose army was strong, initially received popular support among the people near Huatai, but lost that popularity when he demanded that those who joined his forces to provide a large supply of pears—800 per household. With the popular support lost, he was unable to capture Huatai quickly, and as Emperor Taiwu arrived, the Liu Song forces collapsed. Upon hearing this, although the western Liu Song forces, under command of the general Liu Wenjing (柳文景), were successful in capturing Shancheng and Tong Pass and preparing to descend into the Guanzhong region, Emperor Wen withdrew them.

In retaliation for the Liu Song attack, Emperor Taiwu launched an all-out attack against Liu Song's northern provinces. Tuoba Ren quickly captured Xuanhu and Xiangcheng (項城, in modern Zhoukou, Henan) and pillaging his way to Shouyang. Emperor Taiwu himself advanced on Pengcheng, but did not put that heavily fortified city under siege; rather, he advanced south, claiming that he would cross the Yangtze River and destroy the Liu Song capital Jiankang. Both his main army and the other branch armies that he sent out carried out heavy slaughters and arsons, laying Liu Song's Huai River region to waste. Around the new year 451, Emperor Taiwu had reached Guabu (瓜步, in modern Nanjing, Jiangsu), across the river from Jiankang, but at this point he reproposed the marriage-peace proposal he made earlier—that if Emperor Wen married a daughter to one of his grandsons, he would be willing to marry a daughter to Emperor Wen's son, Liu Jun (who was then defending Pengcheng), to establish long-term peace. Emperor Wen's crown prince Liu Shao favored the proposal, but Jiang Dan (江湛) opposed, and the marital proposal was not accepted. In spring 451, worried that his forces were being overstretched and would be attacked in the rear by the Liu Song forces garrisoned at Pengcheng and Shouyang, Emperor Taiwu began a withdraw, and on the way, insulted by the Liu Song general Zang Zhi (臧質), he put Xuyi (盱眙, in modern Huai'an, Jiangsu) under siege, and, after both sides suffered heavy losses but with the defense holding, quickly withdrew. This campaign appeared to heavily wear out both empires and demonstrated the cruel parts of Emperor Taiwu's personality well, as Sima Guang described it in this manner:

The Wei forces laid South Yan, Xu, North Yan, Yu, Qing, and Ji Provinces to waste. The Song deaths and injuries were innumerable. When Wei forces encountered Song young men, the forces quickly beheaded them or cut them in half. The infants were pierced through with spears, and the spears were then shaken so that the infants would scream as they were spun, for entertainment. The commanderies and counties that Wei forces went through were burned and slaughtered, and not even grass was left. When sparrows returned in the spring, they could not find houses to build nest on, so they had to do so in forests. Wei soldiers and horses also suffered casualties of more than half, and the Xianbei people were all complaining.

Another part of Emperor Taiwu's personality that was revealed as how, even as the states were engaging wars, he was maintaining formal protocols of détente. For example, when he was outside of Pengcheng, he requested Liu Jun supply him with wine and sugarcanes, while offering Liu Jun a gift of camels, mules, and coats. Later, he requested oranges and gambling supplies from Liu Jun, while offering Liu Jun blankets, salts, and pickled beans. Similar things happened as he was at Guabu, as he requested and sent gifts to and from Emperor Wen. (How Zang aggravated him was by sending him urine when he requested wine, thus breaking the pattern of formal exchanges of gifts.)

In 451, Emperor Taiwu considered the earlier legal code to be difficult to follow, and considered this to be the reason why there were many criminals. Therefore, he ordered the officials You Ya (游雅) and Hu Fanghui (胡方回) to revise the legal code. Their legal code had 391 provisions, with four crimes warranting the execution of the offender's clan, 145 crimes warranting the execution of just the offender, and 221 warranting lesser punishments. This legal code was said to be more comprehensive than previous legal codes, and added laws including laws regarding aiding criminals, relations, and housing. However, despite the changes in the legal code, the officials were unable to clarify the new laws, and internal issues persisted.

In 451, there would be further political turmoil, with Crown Prince Huang and his associates being the victims. Crown Prince Huang had been considered able and all-seeing, but overly trusting of his associates, while privately managing farms and orchards and receiving profits from them. Crown Prince Huang greatly disliked the eunuch Zong Ai, and Zong decided to act first, accusing Crown Prince Huang's associates Chou'ni Daosheng (仇泥道盛) and Ren Pingcheng (任平城) of crimes, and Chou'ni and Ren were executed. Further, many other associates of Crown Prince Huang were dragged into the incident and executed. Crown Prince Huang himself grew ill in anxiety, and died in summer 451. Soon, however, Emperor Taiwu found out that Crown Prince Huang was not guilty, and became heavily regretful of his actions in pursuing the crown prince's associates. He did not create a new crown prince, although he briefly created Crown Prince Huang's son Tuoba Jun the Prince of Gaoyang—but then cancelled that creation, figuring that the heir of the crown prince should not be created a mere imperial prince, suggesting that he intended for Tuoba Jun to inherit the throne.

Because of how much Emperor Taiwu missed Crown Prince Huang, Zong Ai became anxious, and in spring 452 he assassinated Emperor Taiwu. Initially, a number of officials were going to make Emperor Taiwu's son Tuoba Han (拓跋翰) the Prince of Dongping emperor, but Zong also had bad relations with Tuoba Han, and so falsely issued orders in the name of Empress Helian to make another son of Emperor Taiwu's, Tuoba Yu the Prince of Nan'an, emperor, while putting Tuoba Han to death.

== Family ==
=== Consorts and issue ===
- Empress Taiwu, of the Helian clan (太武皇后 赫連氏; d. 453)
- Empress Jing'ai, of the He clan (敬哀皇后 賀氏; d. 428)
  - Tuoba Huang, Emperor Jingmu (景穆皇帝 拓跋晃; 428–451), first son
- Zhaoyi, of the Yujiulü clan (左昭儀 鬱久閭氏)
  - Tuoba Yu, Prince Yin of Nan'an (南安隱王 拓跋餘; d. 452)
- Jiaofang, of the Yue clan (椒房 越氏)
  - Tuoba Fuluo, Prince Jin (晉王 拓跋伏羅; d. 447), second son
- Jiaofang, of the Shu clan (椒房 舒氏)
  - Tuoba Han, Prince Dongping (東平王 拓跋翰; d. 452), third son
- Jiaofang, of the Fu clan (椒房 弗氏)
  - Tuoba Tan, Prince Xuan of Linhuai (臨淮宣王 拓跋譚; d. 452), fourth son
- Jiaofang, of the Fu clan (椒房 伏氏)
  - Tuoba Jian, Prince Jian of Guangyang (廣陽簡王 拓跋建; d. 452), fifth son
- Unknown
  - Tuoba Xiao'er (拓跋小兒)
  - Tuoba Mao'er (拓跋貓兒)
  - Tuoba Zhen (拓跋真)
  - Tuoba Hutou (拓跋虎頭)
  - Tuoba Longtou (拓跋龍頭)
  - Princess Shanggu (上谷公主)
    - Married Yi Gui of Henan, Prince Xiping (河南 乙瑰), and had issue (one son)

== In popular culture ==
- Portrayed by Canti Lau in the 2016 Chinese TV series The Princess Weiyoung.

Regnal titles
Preceded by Emperor Mingyuan of Northern Wei	Emperor of Northern Wei; 424–452	Succeeded by Tuoba Yu
Preceded by Emperor Mingyuan of Northern Wei	Emperor of China (Northern); 424–452	Succeeded by Tuoba Yu
Preceded by Helian Chang of Xia	Emperor of China (Northern Shaanxi); 427–452	Succeeded by Tuoba Yu
Preceded by Helian Ding of Xia	Emperor of China (Central Shaanxi/Eastern Gansu); 430–452	Succeeded by Tuoba Yu
Preceded by Feng Hong of Northern Yan	Emperor of China (Liaoning); 436–452	Succeeded by Tuoba Yu
Preceded by Juqu Mujian of Northern Liang	Emperor of China (Central/Western Gansu); 439–452	Succeeded by Tuoba Yu
Preceded by Murong Muliyan of Tuyuhun	Emperor of China (Southern Gansu/Eastern Qinghai); 444–452	Succeeded by Tuoba Yu
