= Helian Bobo =

Hu Xia Emperor from 407 to 425

Emperor Wulie of Xia 夏武烈帝
- Emperor of Hu Xia

Emperor of Hu Xia
- Reign: 407–425
- Successor: Helian Chang
- Born: 381
- Died: 425 (aged 43–44)
Full name
- Family name: Originally Liú (劉), later changed to Hèlián (赫連) in 413; Given name: Bóbó (勃勃)
Era dates
- Lóngshēng (龍升): 407–413; Fèngxiáng (鳳翔): 413–418; Chāngwǔ (昌武): 418–419; Zhēnxīng (真興): 419–425
Regnal name
- Grand Chanyu, Heavenly King of Great Xia (大單于 大夏天王, 407–417); Emperor (since 417)
Posthumous name
- Emperor Wǔliè (武烈皇帝, lit. "martial and achieving")
Temple name
- Shìzǔ (世祖)
- House: Helian
- Dynasty: Hu Xia
- Father: Liu Weichen

Helian Bobo (Chinese: 赫連勃勃; Middle Chinese Guangyun: [xɐk-li̯ɛn˩ bʰuət-bʰuət]; 381 – c. September 425), né Liu Bobo (劉勃勃), epithet Qujie (屈孑), posthumous name Emperor Wulie of Hu Xia, was the founder of the Hu Xia dynasty, one of the Sixteen Kingdoms of China. He belonged to the Tiefu (鐵弗) branch of the Xiongnu, was a descendant of the southern chanyu Liu Qubei, and the son of Liu Weichen, its chieftain. After his father was killed by Northern Wei and the tribe collapsed, Liu Bobo sought refuge with Moyigan, a Xianbei chieftain of Later Qin, and married Moyigan's daughter. As an adult, noted for his imposing stature, eloquence, and intelligence, he won the favor of Emperor Yao Xing of Later Qin, who appointed him a general and placed more than thirty thousand men from the Tiefu and other tribes under his command.

In 407, after Later Qin made peace with Northern Wei, Liu Bobo rebelled. Claiming descent from the Xia dynasty royal line, he styled himself Heavenly King of Great Xia and Grand Chanyu and adopted the era name Longsheng (龍昇), marking the establishment of the Xia state. He spent the following years roaming the northern steppe, deploying cavalry offensives against Later Qin and Southern Liang in the Shuofang region.

In 413, after a series of successful campaigns against Later Qin and Southern Liang, he considered his position secure. He mobilized one hundred thousand people to build a new capital at Tongwan on the steppe along the Wuding River, took the surname Helian, and adopted the era name Fengxiang (鳳翔).

In 417, after the Jin dynasty chancellor Liu Yu led the imperial forces of Jin north, they captured Chang'an (長安), the capital of Later Qin, seized its last ruler Yao Hong, and brought the state to an end. Liu Yu then withdrew south, leaving his generals to hold the capital. Helian Bobo took the opportunity, struck the garrison amid infighting among the Jin commanders, drove out the Jin forces, occupied Chang'an, enthroned himself as emperor of Great Xia, and adopted the era name Changwu (昌武). He designated Chang'an the southern capital and Tongwan the northern capital, then returned to Tongwan. The following year, upon completion of the palaces at Tongwan, he introduced a new era name, Zhenxing (真興). Contemporary sources portray his rule as severe and often cruel.

In 425, Helian Bobo died in the Yong'an Hall (永安殿) at Tongwan at the age of forty five. He was posthumously honored as Emperor Wulie of Xia (夏武烈帝).

== Early life ==
Liu Bobo was born in 381, when his father Liu Weichen was a chief of the Tiefu tribe and a vassal of the Former Qin. It is not known whether his mother Lady Fu was Liu Weichen's wife or concubine. He was one of Liu Weichen's younger sons. After the Former Qin collapsed in light of various rebellions after its emperor Fu Jiān's defeat at the Battle of Fei River in 383, Liu Weichen took control of what is now part of Inner Mongolia south of the Yellow River and extreme northern Shaanxi, and while he nominally submitted to both the Later Qin and Western Yan as a vassal, he was actually a powerful independent ruler. However, in 391, he sent his son Liu Zhilidi to attack the Northern Wei's prince Tuoba Gui, and Tuoba Gui not only defeated Liu Zhilidi, but crossed the Yellow River to attack Liu Weichen's capital Yueba (in modern Ordos, Inner Mongolia), capturing it and forcing Liu Weichen and Liu Zhilidi to flee. The next day, Liu Weichen was killed by his subordinates, and Liu Zhilidi was captured. Tuoba Gui seized Liu Weichen's territory and people and slaughtered his clan.

However, Liu Bobo survived the disaster and fled to the Xuegan tribe (薛干; also known as Chigan (叱干)), which had once been under his father's authority. Its chief, Taixifu, fearing reprisals after receiving Tuoba Gui's demand for Bobo, had him bound and sent under guard. On the way, however, Taixifu's nephew Chigan Ali (叱干阿利) secretly dispatched men to intercept the escort, free Bobo, and deliver him to the Moyigan of the Poduoluo tribe (破多羅), the Duke of Gaoping, a Later Qin vassal and a former ally of Liu Bobo's father Liu Weichen. Moyigan not only gave Liu Bobo refuge but also married one of his daughters to Liu Bobo. Liu Bobo, from that point on, became highly dependent on his father-in-law. (Meanwhile, in 393, Tuoba Gui, because of Taixifu's refusal to deliver Liu Bobo to him, attacked Tai and slaughtered his people, although Tai himself escaped and fled to Later Qin.) Little is known about Liu Bobo's life during the following years. In 402, Tuoba Gui's brother Tuoba Zun, the Prince of Changshan attacked Moyiyu's homebase of Gaoping (in modern Guyuan, Ningxia), and Moyigan was forced to flee to Later Qin, abandoning his own people, who were scattered about, although later the Later Qin recaptured Gaoping and gave it back to Moyigan.

Sometime before 407, because Liu Bobo was the son in law of the Xianbei leader Moyigan, he was presented at the court of Later Qin's Emperor Yao Xing. At that time, Liu Bobo stood nearly two meters tall, with broad shoulders and an imposing build, quick witted and eloquent, and the son of a Xiongnu chieftain. Yao Xing was struck by him at first sight and soon considered appointing him a general, entrusting him with troops to guard against Northern Wei. Yao Xing's brother Yao Yong, however, spoke against it, believing Liu Bobo to be untrustworthy, stating:

Liu Bobo is arrogant toward his superiors and elders. He is cruel to his subordinates and associates. He is also greedy, treacherous, lacking in love, and inattentive to friendships. He changes his attitude quickly and abandons things quickly. If you overly trust and favor this type of person, he will surely create a disaster.

Yao Xing initially, at Yao Yong's counsel, did not give Liu Bobo a commission, but eventually was so seduced by his talent that he made him a general and the Duke of Wuyuan, entrusting him with some thirty thousand Xiongnu, Xianbei, and other tribesmen under arms and giving him the responsibility of defending Shuofang (in modern Ordos).

In 407, after suffering a number of losses against Northern Wei, Yao Xing decided to make peace with Northern Wei. Upon hearing this, Liu Bobo became angry, because his father had been killed by Northern Wei, and he planned rebellion. He therefore forcibly seized the horses that Yujiulü Shelun, the khan of Rouran, had recently offered to Yao Xing as a tribute, and then made a surprise attack against Moyigan, capturing Gaoping and killing Moyigan, seizing his troops. He then declared himself a descendant of Yu the Great, the founder of the Xia dynasty, and proclaimed the state as Great Xia (大夏). He claimed the title "Heavenly King" (Tian Wang).

== Early reign ==
Despite Liu Bobo's stated hatred for Northern Wei, he concentrated his efforts on undermining Later Qin, continually harassing Later Qin's northern territories and draining Later Qin's resources. He therefore did not settle in a capital city; rather, he roved about with his mobile cavalry, constantly looking for Later Qin cities to pillage.

His advisers urged Helian Bobo to build a fortress in difficult terrain, saying it would be easier to defend and would reassure the people. Bobo refused. He argued that his army was still small, while Yao Xing controlled Guanzhong with many cities and strong defenses. If he stayed in one place, Yao could simply bring a large force to surround him. Instead, Bobo relied on the mobility of his cavalry. By moving quickly and keeping his position uncertain, he could always attack where Yao was weak. If Yao sent troops to the front, Bobo would strike at the rear; if Yao shifted troops back, Bobo would attack the front. Raiding the countryside also allowed his men to live off the land while weakening the enemy's economy and keeping Yao's army constantly on the move. He declared with confidence that within ten years Yao's dominion would be his. To support his claim, he invoked his own ancestry, saying that the Yellow Emperor (Huangdi), from whom he traced his line, had lived for more than twenty years without building walls or fixed settlements, relying instead on a nomadic way of life before at last securing rule over all under Heaven. Helian Bobo proclaimed that he would follow the same example in his own time.

Also in 407, Liu Bobo sought marriage with a daughter of the Southern Liang prince Tufa Rutan, but Tufa Rutan refused. In anger, Liu Bobo launched a punitive raid against Southern Liang but then retreated. Tufa Rutan gave chase and —believing that he greatly outpowered Liu Bobo— was careless in his military actions. Liu Bobo led him into a canyon and then blocked the exit with ice and wagons, and then ambushed him—and the defeat was such that it was said that 60% to 70% of Southern Liang's famed officials and generals died in the battle. Tufa Rutan barely escaped capture.

In 408, Yao Xing sent his general Qi Nan to launch a major attack on Liu Bobo. Liu Bobo initially withdraw to let Qi believe that he feared Qi, and Liu Bobo made a surprise counter-attack and captured Qi. Subsequently, much of Later Qin's northern territories fell into Xia hands.

In 409, Yao Xing himself launched an attack on Liu Bobo, but when he reached Ercheng (in modern Yan'an, Shaanxi), he was nearly trapped by Liu Bobo, and escaped only after major casualties. This defeat forced Yao Xing to cancel a mission, commanded by his general Yao Qiang, to try to save Southern Yan from being destroyed by the Jin's northern expedition. For the next several years, Xia and Later Qin forces battled constantly, often inconclusively, but with the wars becoming much more costly to Later Qin than Xia, with Southern Liang and Western Qin no longer being willing to be Later Qin vassals as a result. In 412, when Western Qin's prince Qifu Gangui was assassinated by his nephew Qifu Gongfu, Liu Bobo considered attacking Western Qin despite its status as an ally, but at the counsel of his advisor Wang Maide did not do so.

By 413, Liu Bobo resolved to build a capital, which he wanted to make absolutely impenetrable. He commissioned his general Chigan Ali as the chief architect of the capital, which he named Tongwan — because, as he stated, he wanted to unite China and be the lord of 10,000 states. ("Tong" means "unite," while "wan" means 10,000.) Chigan ordered that the soil used in constructing the wall be steamed, so that it would be hardened and difficult to attack, and he often tested the walls during its construction; if an iron wedge were able to insert even one inch deep into the wall, the workmen in charge of that section of wall would be executed. Further, Liu Bobo himself ordered that when weapons and armor were made, that some of the metalsmiths would be executed—because his orders were, for example, that arrows should be shot at armors; if the arrows could penetrate the armor, the smiths who forged the armor would be executed, and if the arrows could not penetrate the armor, then the smiths who made the arrows would be executed. As a result, Tongwan became a highly defensible city, and the weapons and armors that he had were all of exceedingly high quality.

Also in 413, Liu Bobo believed that his family name should be changed—since his ancestors took on the Liu family name from the Han dynasty imperial house, believing that one of their female ancestors was a Han princess, but Liu Bobo believed this was improper. He therefore changed his family name to Helian—intending it to mean that his might was so great that it would, alas (赫 hè) be connected (連 lián) to the heavens. He also ordered the nobles to change their family name to Tiefa (鐵伐), intending it to mean that they were as strong as iron (鐵 tiě) and be able to attack (伐 fá) others. However, according to Chen Sanping, both surnames were of Xiongnu origin, with Helian being an alternate transcription of qílián (祁連), the Xiongnu word for sky. Thus, Helian was simply a Chinese folk etymology propagated by Helian himself as an explanation for his Xiongnu surname.

In 414, Helian Bobo made his wife Lady Liang "Heavenly Princess." (There is no further reference to the fate of his wife, Lady Mo, after he killed her father.) He made his son Helian Gui crown prince, and made his other sons dukes.

In 415, Helian Bobo entered into an alliance with Juqu Mengxun, the prince of Northern Liang.

In 416, with Later Qin, now under the rule of Yao Xing's son Yao Hong, under a major attack by the Jin general Liu Yu, Helian Bobo believed that Later Qin would fall to Jin, but that Jin would not be easily able to hold Later Qin's capital region — Guanzhong. He therefore intensified his own attacks on Later Qin as well, and preparing to use the opportunity of Later Qin's destruction to seize more territory. As Later Qin neared destruction, Helian Bobo seized its western territory, centering Anding (in modern Pingliang, Gansu), and then prepared for an eventual confrontation with Jin forces, which destroyed Later Qin in 417 and captured its capital Chang'an.

The news of Later Qin's collapse reached Helian Bobo, who at once sent envoys to congratulate Liu Yu.

Liu Yu, already aware of his reputation, soon dispatched an envoy in return.

On learning that the envoy was coming, Helian Bobo resolved to put on a display. He ordered his officials to draft an ornate reply and then drilled himself on it until he could recite it from memory. When the envoy arrived, Bobo delivered the letter as if improvised, while scribes at his side wrote it down.

The envoy brought the reply back, reporting that it had been dictated on the spot. Liu Yu, impressed, praised Bobo as a man accomplished in both letters and arms.

In winter 417, Liu Yu, intent on wanting to seize the Jin throne, left Chang'an under the command of his 11-year-old son Liu Yizhen, and while he left several able generals to assist Liu Yizhen, those generals soon conflicted with and began killing each other—and eventually, Liu Yizhen, believing that the main assistant whom Liu Yu had left him, Wang Xiu, was about to rebel, had Wang executed. Meanwhile, Helian Bobo sent his crown prince Helian Gui, another son Helian Chang, and Wang Maide to command armies south, not initially engaging Jin forces but isolating Chang'an from the rest of Jin territory—a task made easier when Liu Yizhen recalled Jin forces near Chang'an all to Chang'an. Upon hearing this, Liu Yu, sent his general Zhu Lingshi to replace Liu Yizhen and recalled Liu Yizhen, but as soon as Liu Yizhen and his troops left Chang'an, they were intercepted and crushed by Xia forces under Helian Gui. Liu Yizhen barely escaped, but the vast majority of the army was captured. Helian Bobo stacked the skulls of the Jin dead into a hill-like structure. Meanwhile, the people of Chang'an, who were angry that Liu Yizhen's forces pillaged the city before leaving, expelled Zhu, allowing Helian Bobo to enter Chang'an easily. Helian Bobo then claimed the title of emperor.

In Chang'an, Helian Bobo invited the scholar Wei Zusi (韋祖思) of Chang'an to an audience. Frightened, Wei conducted himself with excessive caution and deference, which only angered Helian Bobo. Helian rebuked him: “In the past, when Yao Xing summoned you with the courtesies due a man of talent, you still dared to refuse to come. Now that I have brought you to my side, you cower as if before a demon. Do you truly take me for a demon? I am alive, and already you treat me this way. After I am dead, who knows what you will put to paper about me. I will kill you today and see how you malign me thereafter.” He then ordered Wei Zusi executed on the spot.

== Late reign ==
Most of Helian Bobo's officials suggested that he move the capital to Chang'an, but he, believing that Tongwan was in a better position to defend against Northern Wei, refused and kept his capital at Tongwan, leaving Helian Gui in charge of Chang'an as viceroy.

The campaign against Jin showcased Helian Bobo's abilities, but at this time, he also grew increasingly cruel. He was described by traditional historians in this way:

He was arrogant and cruel, treating the people like wild plants and mustard greens. He often climbed up towers with bows and arrows, and whenever he had a sudden thought of distrust, dislike, or anger at a person, he would kill that person personally. If any of his officials looked at him in a gazing manner, he would gouge out their eyes. Anyone who laughed frivolously would have their lips sliced open with knives. Anyone who dared to offer a contrary opinion would first have his tongue cut out and then head cut off.

In 424, Helian Bobo decided to depose Crown Prince Gui and appoint another son, Helian Lun, the Duke of Jiuquan, as crown prince. Upon hearing this news, Helian Gui commanded his troops north from Chang'an and attacked Helian Lun. Their forces met at Gaoping, and Helian Gui defeated and killed Helian Lun. However, Helian Lun's brother Helian Chang then made a surprise attack on Helian Gui, killing him and seizing his troops, leading them back to Tongwan. Helian Bobo was pleased and made Helian Chang crown prince.

In late 425, Helian Bobo fell gravely ill. At the Yong'an Hall (永安殿) in Tongwan, he summoned his ministers and gave his final instructions. Soon afterward, he died there at the age of forty-five.

After Helian Bobo's death, his crown prince, Helian Chang ascended to the throne at the Yong'an Hall. He buried his father on the outskirts of Tongwan, as when Helian Bobo first chose the grasslands along the Wuding River to build the city, he had said, "This is truly a blessed place. Here I wish to spend the rest of my life."

Helian Chang then conscripted twenty-five thousand laborers to construct his father's tomb, which was named the Jiaping Mausoleum. Above the burial chamber, they erected grand halls modeled after the palaces of Tongwan, lavishly adorned with jewels and jade. Once these were completed, Helian Chang ordered them set aflame, so that they might burn to ashes and accompany his father's spirit into the afterlife. He also offered several thousand fine horses as a sacrifice.

== Personal information ==
- Father
  - Liu Weichen (劉衛辰), Tiefu chief, posthumously honored as Emperor Huan
- Mother
  - Lady Fu, posthumously honored as Empress Huanwen
- Wives
  - Lady Poduoluo (破多罗夫人), daughter of Xianbei chief Moyigan (沒奕干)
  - Empress Liang (created 414)
- Children
  - Helian Gui (赫連璝), the Crown Prince (appointed 414, killed in battle by Helian Chang 424)
  - Helian Yan (赫連延), the Duke of Yangping (appointed 414)
  - Helian Chang (赫連昌), initially the Duke of Taiyuan (appointed 414), later Crown Prince (appointed 424), later emperor
  - Helian Lun (赫連倫), the Duke of Jiuquan (appointed 414, killed in battle by Helian Gui 424)
  - Helian Ding (赫連定), initially the Duke of Pingyuan (appointed 414), later the Prince of Pingyuan, later emperor
  - Helian Man (赫連滿), the Duke of Henan (appointed 414, killed by Northern Wei forces 427)
  - Helian An (赫連安), the Duke of Zhongshan (appointed 414)
  - Helian Zhuxing (赫連助興)
  - Helian Weiyidai (赫連謂以代)
  - Helian Shegan (赫連社干), the Duke of Shanggu
  - Helian Duluogu (赫連度洛孤), the Duke of Guangyang
  - Helian Wushiba (赫連烏視拔), the Duke of Danyang
  - Helian Tugu (赫連禿骨), the Duke of Wuling
  - Princess, later Empress Helian of Emperor Taiwu of Northern Wei
  - Princess, later consort of Emperor Taiwu of Northern Wei
  - Princess, later consort of Emperor Taiwu of Northern Wei

== Notes ==
Emperor Wulie of Xia House of Helian Born: 381 Died: 425
Regnal titles
New creation	Emperor of Xia; 407–425	Succeeded by Helian Chang
Titles in pretence
Preceded by Yao Xing	— TITULAR — Emperor of China; 407–425; Reason for succession failure: Sixteen Kingdoms	Succeeded by Helian Chang
Preceded by Yao Hong	— TITULAR — Emperor of China; 407–425; Reason for succession failure: Sixteen Kingdoms	Succeeded by Helian Chang
Preceded by Emperor An of Jin	— TITULAR — Emperor of China; 407–425; Reason for succession failure: Sixteen Kingdoms	Succeeded by Helian Chang
