= Helian Ding =

Helian Ding 赫連定

Emperor of Hu Xia
- Reign: 428–431
- Predecessor: Helian Chang
- Born: Unknown
- Died: 432
Full name
- Family name: Hèlián (赫連); Given name: Dìng (定)
Era name and dates
- Shèngguāng (勝光): 428–431
- House: Helian
- Dynasty: Hu Xia

Helian Ding (Chinese: 赫連定; died 432), nickname Zhifen (直獖), was the third and last emperor of the Xiongnu-led Chinese Hu Xia dynasty. He was a son of the founding emperor Helian Bobo (Emperor Wulie) and a younger brother of his predecessor Helian Chang. After Helian Chang was captured by Northern Wei's army in 428, Helian Ding took the throne himself and for several years tried to resist Northern Wei attacks, but by 430 he had lost nearly his entire territory. In 431, he attempted to head west to try to attack Northern Liang and seize its territory, but on the way, he was intercepted by Tuyuhun's khan Murong Mugui and captured, ending Hu Xia. In 432, Murong Mugui turned him over to the Emperor Taiwu of Northern Wei, who had him executed.

== During Helian Bobo's reign ==
It is not known when Helian Ding was born, or who his mother was. In 414, when Helian Bobo made his son Helian Gui crown prince and the other sons dukes, Helian Chang was made the Duke of Pingyuan. Helian Ding was said to have been a delinquent and frivolous youth, and Helian Bobo had a low opinion of him and gave him little authority.

== During Helian Chang's reign ==
After Helian Bobo's death in 425, Helian Ding's older brother Helian Chang (who had replaced Helian Gui as crown prince in 424) succeeded him. Helian Chang gave Helian Ding more authorities than before, and Helian Ding quickly became one of the major generals that his brother relied on. After rival Northern Wei's general Daxi Jin captured the important city of Chang'an in 426, Helian Chang sent Helian Ding south in early 427 from the capital Tongwan (in modern Yulin, Shaanxi) to try to capture Chang'an. He became stalemated with Daxi at Chang'an.

Meanwhile, knowing that Helian Ding was occupied, Emperor Taiwu of Northern Wei made an attack on Tongwan, and Helian Chang initially wanted to recall Helian Ding from Chang'an; instead, Helian Ding advised him to defend Tongwan securely to wear out Northern Wei's forces, and then he, after capturing Chang'an, could then return and attack Northern Wei's forces on two sides. Helian Chang agreed and did not engage Northern Wei's forces. However, subsequently, receiving false information that Northern Wei forces had run out of food, he attacked Northern Wei's forces and was soundly defeated, and he fled to Shanggui (in modern Tianshui, Gansu). Northern Wei captured Tongwan. Upon hearing the news of Tongwayn's fall, Helian Ding abandoned his campaign against Daxi and joined Helian Chang at Shanggui. Daxi gave chase, intending to destroy Xia. It might have been at this time that Helian Chang promoted Helian Ding to the title of Prince of Pingyuan.

In early 428, after initially withdrawing further from Shanggui to Pingliang (in modern Pingliang, Gansu), Helian Chang went back on the offensive and besieged Daxi's army, which was then afflicted by illnesses, at Anding (in modern Pingliang). However, during the siege, the Northern Wei officers Anchi Jia and Yuchi Juan made a surprise attack on him, and he fell off his horse and was captured. Helian Ding gathered the remaining troops and withdrew to Pingliang. He took the throne himself.

== Reign ==
Meanwhile, Daxi, ashamed that he was nearly destroyed by Hellian Chang at Anding and was only saved by Anchi and Yuchi's ingenuity, proceeded further, without adequate food and water, to try to attack Helian Ding at Pingliang, taking up a dangerous position. A low-level Northern Wei officer who had been charged with crime then fled to the Xia camp and revealed the lack of food and water that Daxi's forces were having. Helian Ding then attacked and captured Daxi. Upon hearing this, the Northern Wei general Qiudun Dui, who was defending Anding, panicked and fled to Chang'an, and then further fled Chang'an with Chang'an's commanding general Tuoba Li to Puban (in modern Yuncheng, Shanxi), allowing Xia forces to recover Chang'an and the surrounding Guanzhong region.

In mid 428, Helian Ding sent an embassy to Northern Wei requesting peace. Instead, Northern Wei's Emperor Taiwu issued an edict ordering him to surrender, which he did not do. On a hunt at which he could see the old capital Tongwan from a distance, Helian Ding lamented that if Helian Bobo had made him crown prince, Tongwan would not have fallen. However, he himself did not try to recapture Tongwan.

In early 430, Liu Song launched a major attack against Northern Wei, and Northern Wei in response temporarily abandoned its territory south of the Yellow River. Helian Ding then entered into an alliance with Emperor Wen of Liu Song against Northern Wei, agreeing to destroy Northern Wei and divide its territory north of the Yellow River—with provinces east of the Taihang Mountains going to Liu Song and west of Taihang going to Xia. However, neither party actually intended to attack Northern Wei's territory north of the Yellow River first, waiting for the other to act, and Northern Wei's Emperor Taiwu took advantage of this and decided to try to destroy Helian Ding first. In late 430, he personally launched a direct assault on Pingliang.

Meanwhile, Western Qin's prince Qifu Mumo, unable to stand pressures from Northern Liang and Tuyuhun, sought to surrender to Northern Wei, and with Northern Wei promising to give Xia's Pingliang and Anding Commanderies to him as his domain, he abandoned his capital Fuhan (in modern Linxia Hui Autonomous Prefecture, Gansu) and headed east, intending to join Northern Wei forces at Shanggui. Upon hearing this, Helian Ding personally tried to intercept Qifu Mumo, who was forced to stop at Nan'an (in modern Longxi, Gansu), with his territory having otherwise all fallen to Tuyuhun.

By this time, though, Northern Wei's emperor had arrived at Pingliang, and, with Helian Chang (whom he had made Prince of Qin) with him, he had Helian Chang to try to persuade the defender of Pingliang, Helian Ding's younger brother Helian Shegan, the Duke of Shanggu to surrender. Helian Shegan initially refused. Helian Ding, hearing that Pingliang was under attack, tried to return to Pingliang to relieve it, but on the way he encountered the Northern Wei general Tuxi Bi, who tricked him by pretending to be a weak force, drawing an attack from him. Tuxi then defeated Helian Ding, who was then forced to withdraw to Chungu Plains (in modern Pingliang). Northern Wei forces surrounded him, and his army became hungry and thirsty. After several days, he forcibly fought his way out of the siege, but his forces mostly collapsed, and he himself was badly injured. He gathered the remaining forces and fled to Shanggui.

Around the new year of 431, Helian Shegan and another brother, Helian Duluogu, the Duke of Guangyang, surrendered Pignliang to Northern Wei, and Anding fell as well. Northern Wei's emperor seized Helian Ding's empress and gave her to his general Doudai Tian as a concubine. The other Xia cities' defenders also fled or were captured, allowing Northern Wei to take those cities. Helian Ding himself felt he could not hold Shanggui much further, sent his uncle Helian Weifa, the Duke of Beiping to attack Western Qin's only remaining city, Nan'an. The people of Nan'an were starving and engaged in cannibalism. Qifu Mumo, unable to do anything else, surrendered. Helian Weifa delivered Qifu Mumo to Shanggui, and Helian Ding executed Qifu Mumo and his clan.

Helian Ding then headed west and crossed the Yellow River at Zhicheng (in modern Linxia), intending to attack Northern Liang and seize its territory. However, the khan of Tuyuhun, Murong Mugui, had anticipated this and sent his brothers Murong Muliyan and Murong Shiqian to intercept Helian Ding, and as the Xia army was crossing the river, Tuyuhun forces attacked and captured Helian Ding, ending Xia.

== After capture by Murong Mugui ==
Murong Mugui did not kill Helian Ding initially. In late 431, however, he sent messengers to Northern Wei to declare his loyalty and to indicate that he was willing to deliver Helian Ding to Northern Wei. In response, Northern Wei's Emperor Taiwu made Murong Mugui the Prince of Xiqin and gave him rewards, and in early 432 Murong Mugui delivered Helian Ding to Northern Wei. Northern Wei's emperor executed Helian Ding.

== Empress ==
Very little is known about the wife of Helian Ding. Helian Ding took the throne in 428 after his brother Helian Chang was captured by rival Northern Wei's forces, and it was sometime after that he made his wife empress. When his brothers Helian Shegan, the Duke of Shanggu and Helian Duluogu, the Duke of Guangyang surrendered his capital Pingliang (in modern Pingliang, Gansu) to Emperor Taiwu of Northern Wei in 430, she was captured. Emperor Taiwu gave her to his general Doudai Tian as a concubine. Nothing further is known about her.

== Personal information ==
- Father
  - Helian Bobo (Emperor Wulie)
- Wife
  - (name unknown)

Prince of Pingyuan House of Helian Died: 432
Regnal titles
Preceded by Helian Chang	Emperor of Xia; 428–431	Extinct
Chinese royalty
Preceded by Himself as Duke of Pingyuan	Prince of Pingyuan; 427–428	Merge into the Crown
Chinese nobility
Recreated Last known title holder: Murong Yuan	Duke of Pingyuan; 414–427	Succeeded by Himself as Prince of Pingyuan
Titles in pretence
Preceded by Helian Chang	— TITULAR — Emperor of China; 428–431; Reason for succession failure: Annexed by Northern Wei	Succeeded by Emperor Taiwu of Northern Wei
