= Helian Chang =

Helian Chang 赫連昌

Emperor of Hu Xia
- Reign: 425–428
- Predecessor: Helian Bobo
- Successor: Helian Ding
- Born: Unknown
- Died: May 7, 434
Full name
- Family name: Hèlián (赫連); Given name: Chāng (昌)
Era name and dates
- Chéngguāng (承光): 425–428
- House: Helian
- Dynasty: Hu Xia

Helian Chang (Chinese: 赫連昌; died 434), courtesy name Huanguo (還國), nickname Zhe (折), was the second and penultimate emperor of the Hu Xia dynasty of China. He was the successor and a son of the founding emperor Helian Bobo (Emperor Wulie). After his father's death in 425, he tried to expand Hu Xia's territory further, but soon his state began to collapse in light of pressure from the rival Northern Wei dynasty. In 427, his capital Tongwan (in modern Yulin, Shaanxi) fell to Northern Wei forces, and in 428 he himself was captured. The Emperor Taiwu of Northern Wei did not kill him but instead treated him as an honored companion, marrying a sister to him and making high titles for him—initially the Duke of Kuaiji and later the Prince of Qin—but in 434 (after his brother and successor Helian Ding had been captured and executed, ending the Hu Xia), he tried to escape and was killed.

== During Helian Bobo's reign ==
It is not known when Helian Chang was born, or who his mother was. The first historical reference to him was in 414, when Helian Bobo, then carrying the title "Heavenly King" (Tian Wang), made his brother Helian Gui crown prince and made him and his other brothers dukes—in Helian Chang's case, Duke of Taiyuan. (The order in which the brothers were created appears to imply that Helian Chang was the third son.)

In 416, after Helian Bobo had captured the Later Qin city Yinmi (in modern Pingliang, Gansu), he commissioned Helian Chang as the governor of Yong Province (roughly modern central and northern Shaanxi, but at that point still mostly in Later Qin hands) to defend Yinmi.

In 417, after the Jin general Liu Yu had captured the Later Qin capital Chang'an and destroyed Later Qin, but had then left the Chang'an region (modern Guanzhong) in the hands of his 10-year-old son Liu Yizhen and several of his generals, Helian Bobo decided to try to conquer Chang'an. He had Helian Chang, Helian Gui, and his key advisor Wang Maide command the troops. Helian Chang's responsibility was to cut off Tong Gate (in modern Tongguan County, Weinan, Shaanxi), so that Jin forces could not escape. In 418, Xia forces crushed Liu Yizhen's forces as he tried to withdraw from Chang'an, capturing or killing most of Liu Yizhen's army. Liu Yizhen's successor, the Jin general Zhu Lingshi was expelled by the people of Chang'an and fled to Caogong Castle (also in Weinan), where Helian Chang besieged him and his brother Zhu Chaoshi by cutting off the water supply, and then attacking the castle, capturing and killing the Zhu brothers.

In 424, Helian Bobo decided to depose Crown Prince Gui and make another son, Helian Lun, the Duke of Jiuquan crown prince. Upon hearing this news, Helian Gui commanded his troops north from Chang'an and attacked Helian Lun. Their forces met at Gaoping (in modern Guyuan, Ningxia), and Helian Gui defeated and killed Helian Lun. However, Helian Chang then made a surprise attack on Helian Gui, killing him and seizing his troops, leading them back to the capital Tongwan. Helian Bobo was pleased and made Helian Chang crown prince.

In 425, Helian Bobo died, and Helian Chang succeeded him as emperor.

== Reign ==
Helian Chang was a fierce soldier, and while his abilities in governing the state were not known, he tried to expand his state's borders.

In 426, with Western Qin's prince Qifu Chipan attacking Northern Liang, Northern Liang's prince Juqu Mengxun sent messengers to persuade Helian Chang to attack the Western Qin capital Fuhan (in modern Linxia Hui Autonomous Prefecture, Gansu). Helian Chang, in response, sent his general Hulu Gu to attack Wanchuan (in modern Baiyin, Gansu) and Wei Fa to attack Nan'an (in modern Dingxi, Gansu), and while Western Qin was able to hold Wanchuan, Nan'an fell, at great loss. In late 426, Xia forces commanded by Hulu and Wei attack Fuhan, forcing Qifu Gangui to move the capital to Dinglian (also in Linxia), and Hulu and Wei then captured another important Western Qin city, Xiping (in modern Xining, Qinghai), and while they then withdrew, Western Qin had been dealt a major blow.

However, Helian Chang himself now had a threat on his hands. In late 426, Emperor Taiwu of Northern Wei crossed the frozen Yellow River and made a surprise attack at Tongwan. On the December solstice, Helian Chang was holding a feast for his officials to celebrate, and suddenly, with Northern Wei forces on the horizon, the entire Xia regime was shaken. Helian Chang himself engaged the Northern Wei forces but was defeated, and as he retreated into the city, the city gates could not close quickly, and the Northern Wei officer Doudai Tian entered the city and set the palace on fire, before withdrawing. The Northern Wei forces pillaged the area around Tongwan, and then withdrew.

Meanwhile, two other Northern Wei forces attacked two other key Xia cities—the general Daxi Jin attacked Puban (in modern Yuncheng, Shanxi), and the general Pu Ji attacked Shancheng (in modern Sanmenxia, Henan). Pu quickly captured Shancheng and then advanced into the Chang'an region, but died of an illness on the way, and so his army withdrew. Meanwhile, when Daxi approached Puban, the Xia general defending Puban, Helian Yidou sent a messenger to Tongwan requesting help—but when the messenger arrived at Tongwan, he saw Northern Wei forces attacking it, and he ran back to Puban, informing Helian Yidou incorrectly that Tongwan had fallen. Helian Yidou therefore abandoned Puban and fled to Chang'an, and after he arrived there, he and Helian Chang's brother Helian Zhuxing, who was defending Chang'an, abandoned it and fled to Anding (in modern Pingliang, Gansu), and Northern Wei thus captured the southern half of Xia.

In early 427, Helian Chang sent his brother Helian Ding, the Duke of Pingyuan south, hoping to recapture Chang'an. Helian Ding became stalemated with Daxi Jin at Chang'an. Meanwhile, knowing that Helian Ding was occupied, Northern Wei's Emperor Taiwu made another attack on Tongwan, and this time, Helian Chang initially wanted to recall Helian Ding from Chang'an; instead, Helian Ding advised him to defend Tongwan securely to wear out the Northern Wei forces, and then he, after capturing Chang'an, could then return and attack Northern Wei forces on two sides. Helian Chang agreed and did not engage Northern Wei's forces.

However, Helian Chang then received misinformation that Northern Wei's forces were out of food supplies and vulnerable. Helian Chang led his army out of the city and attacked the Northern Wei forces. Initially, he was winning the battle, and he almost captured the Northern Wei emperor. However, the Northern Wei forces then fought back and defeated the Xia forces, killing Helian Chang's brother Helian Man and nephew Helian Mengxun. Helian Chang was so panicked by the loss that he did not retreat back to Tongwan, but fled to Shanggui (in modern Tianshui, Gansu). Northern Wei forces entered Tongwan and captured the nobles and imperial clan members, including Helian Bobo's and Helian Chang's empresses, as well as Helian Chang's sisters. The Northern Wei emperor took three of Helian Chang's sisters as concubines. Upon hearing the news of Tongwayn's fall, Helian Ding abandoned his campaign against Daxi and joined Helian Chang at Shanggui. Daxi gave chase, intending to destroy Xia.

In early 428, with Daxi's subordinate Yuchi Juan sieging Shanggui, Helian Chang withdrew to Pingliang. Meanwhile, Daxi's forces arrived, but were being afflicted with diseases. Helian Chang took the opportunity to counterattack, forcing Northern Wei forces to take refuge in Anding. Helian Chang attacked on a daily basis, and it appeared that Anding would fall to him. However, Daxi's subordinate Anchi Jia and Yuchi then, without Daxi's approval, undertook a daring plan—as Northern Wei soldiers were by now familiar with Helian Chang's appearance, one day, when Helian Chang was again attacking Anding, Anchi and Yuchi led soldiers to make a strike intending to capture him. Helian Chang fell off his horse, and Anchi took him captive. Helian Ding withdrew to Pingliang and took the throne himself.

== After capture by Northern Wei ==
Helian Chang was delivered to the Northern Wei capital Pingcheng (in modern Datong, Shanxi). Instead of killing him, Emperor Taiwu gave him the western palace as his residence, with supplies fitting an emperor. He also made Helian Chang the Duke of Kuaiji and gave Helian Chang his sister Princess Shiping in marriage. He often had Helian Chang attend him on hunts. Because Helian Chang was respected as a mighty soldier, the Northern Wei officials often feared that Helian Chang might assassinate the emperor, but the emperor trusted Helian Chang and continued to treat him well.

In 429, Helian Chang was effectively used as a witness at the imperial advisory council, for the prime minister Cui Hao as he confronted astrologers Zhang Yuan and Xu Bian, who were advising against a campaign against Rouran, which Cui advocated. The astrologers, who were previously Xia court astrologers, argued that the stars were favoring Rouran and that a campaign would be fruitless. Cui, himself an astrologer, pointed out that if Zhang and Xu could predict the future, then they should have warned Helian Chang, who was present at the council as well, before Tongwan fell—that if they knew what would happen and did not warn Helian Chang, then they were unfaithful; if they did not know what would happen, then they had no prophetic abilities. With Helian Chang present, Zhang and Xu knew that he would confirm that they never informed him of impending doom, and so they withdrew their opposition.

In 430, Emperor Taiwu promoted Helian Chang's title to Prince of Qin. The reason is unclear, but perhaps he was considering using Helian Chang to counter his brother Helian Ding, against whom Emperor Taiwu was waging a campaign against—and in late 430, he had Helian Chang try to persuade Helian Shegan into surrendering Pingliang to him; Helian Shegan initially refused, but surrendered after less than two months. In 431, pressured by Northern Wei forces, Helian Ding, after first destroying Western Qin and its prince Qifu Mumo, intended to head west to attack Northern Liang and capture its territory, but on the way was intercepted, defeated, and captured by the Tuyuhun khan Murong Mugui, ending Xia.

In 434, Helian Chang turned against Wei and fled west from Pingcheng. He was intercepted by the Wei generals west of the Yellow River and killed. Northern Wei then executed his surviving brothers.

== Era name ==
- Chengguang (承光 chéng guāng) 425–428

== Personal information ==
- Father
  - Helian Bobo (Emperor Wulie)
- Wives
  - Empress (name unknown)
  - Princess Shiping of Northern Wei (married 428)

Prince of Qin House of Helian Died: 434
Regnal titles
Preceded by Helian Bobo	Emperor of Xia; 425–428	Succeeded by Helian Ding
Chinese royalty
Preceded by Himself as Duke of Kuaiji	Prince of Qin; 430–434	Unknown Next known title holder: Yang Jun
Chinese nobility
Recreated Title last held by Lü Zuan	Duke of Taiyuan; 414–425	Merge into the Crown
Recreated Last known title holder: Emperor Huai of Jin	Duke of Kuaiji; 428–430	Succeeded by Himself as Prince of Qin
Titles in pretence
Preceded by Helian Bobo	— TITULAR — Emperor of China; 425–428; Reason for succession failure: Sixteen Kingdoms	Succeeded by Helian Ding
Preceded by Helian Bobo	— TITULAR — Emperor of China; 425–428; Reason for succession failure: Sixteen Kingdoms	Succeeded by Emperor Taiwu of Northern Wei
