= Xia (Sixteen Kingdoms) =

Chinese Sixteen Kingdoms state (407–431)

Xia 夏
- 407–431
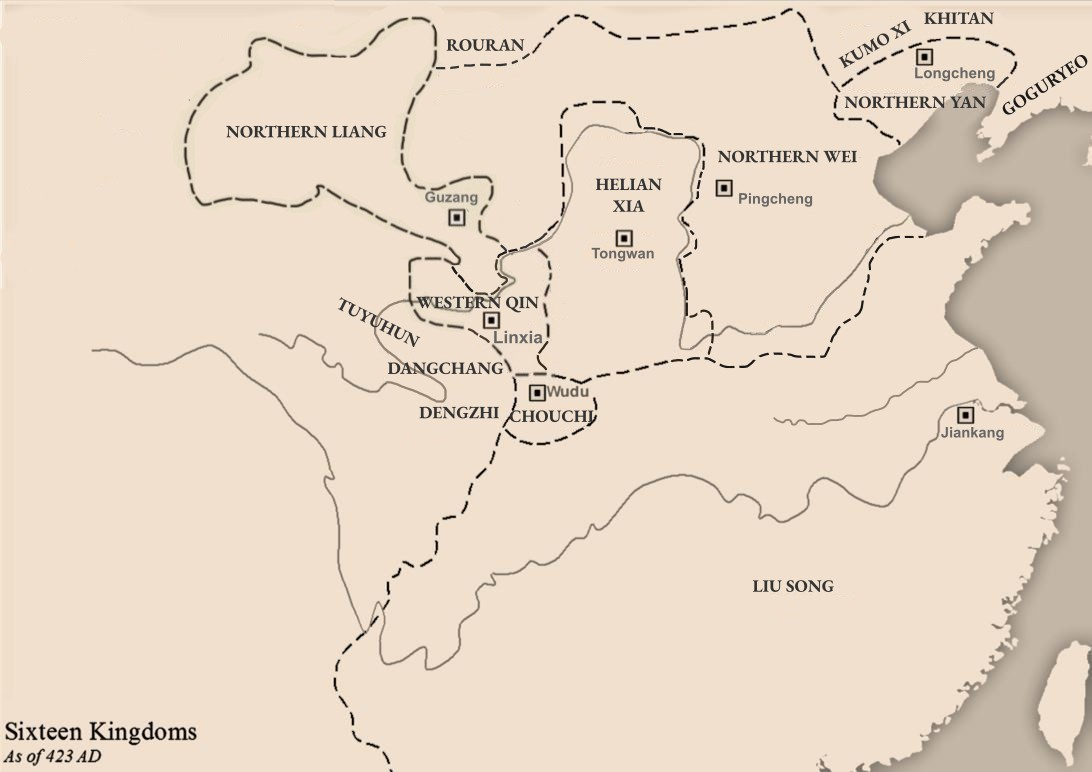
- Helian Xia in 423
- Capital: Tongwan (418–427); Shanggui (427–428); Pingliang (428–430)
- Government: Monarchy
- Emperor
  - 407–425: Helian Bobo
  - 425–428: Helian Chang
  - 428–431: Helian Ding
- History
  - Established: 407
  - Helian Bobo's claim of imperial title: 418
  - Fall of Tongwan: 11 July 427
  - Disestablished: 431
  - Helian Ding's death: 13 May 432
Preceded by
Later Qin
Western Qin
Succeeded by
Northern Wei
Tuyuhun
Liu Song dynasty
- Today part of: China

Xia (Chinese: 夏; pinyin: Xià), known in historiography as Hu Xia (胡夏), Xiongnu Xia (匈奴夏), Helian Xia (赫連夏) or the Great Xia (大夏), was a dynastic state of China ruled by the Helian clan of Tiefu-Xiongnu ethnicity during the Sixteen Kingdoms period. Prior to establishing the Xia, the imperial clan existed as a tribal entity known as the Tiefu (simplified Chinese: 铁弗; traditional Chinese: 鐵弗; pinyin: Tiěfú).

All rulers of the Xia declared themselves "emperors". Both the Tiefu and Xia were based in the Ordos Desert, and during the reign of Helian Bobo, they constructed their capital of Tongwan, a heavily fortified and state-of-the-art city that served as a frontier garrison until the Song dynasty. Its ruins were discovered during the Qing dynasty and can still be seen in present-day Northern Shaanxi. At the height of their power, the Xia also controlled the Guanzhong region in modern-day central Shaanxi. Due to being a mix of the Xiongnu and Xianbei ethnicities, the Tiefu were initially classed as a group of Wuhuan, which had become a broad ethnic label in the 4th century. It was not until Helian Bobo came to power that they fully affirm their Xiongnu lineage in a bid for legitimacy by claiming descent from the ancient Xia dynasty.

== History ==
=== Tiefu tribe ===
The rulers of Xia came from the Tiefu tribe, who descended from the Southern Xiongnu Wise Prince of the Left, Qubei. Qubei was a member of the imperial Luandi clan as the uncle of the last chanyu, Huchuquan, although a later and more dubious account alleged that he was the descendant of a Han dynasty prince-turned-Xiongnu noble, Liu Jinbo instead. In 196, Qubei assisted the warlord, Cao Cao in escorting Emperor Xian of Han to Xuchang, and in 216, Cao Cao appointed him to supervise the Five Divisions of the Southern Xiongnu in modern-day Shanxi. As the Xiongnu imperial family claimed descent from the Han dynasty through their heqin marriages with Han princesses, Qubei's family adopted "Liu" (劉) as their surname.

Qubei's family entered a decline following his death. His son, Liu Meng rebelled against the Western Jin but received little support and was ultimately killed. His brother, Liu Gaoshengyuan inherited his followers, and Gaoshengyuan's son, Liu Hu later succeeded him to the chieftaincy. Liu Hu further adopted the clan name of "Tiefu", meaning a person with a Xiongnu father and Xianbei mother, which suggests that his tribe had intermingled with the Xianbei. Additionally, the Tiefu were also referred to as Wuhuan, which by Liu Hu's time, had become a broad label for Xiongnu tribes that mixed with the Donghu people (Wuhuan and Xianbei).

In 310, Liu Hu led his people to another revolt, but the Jin, with aid from the Tuoba-Xianbei tribe, drove him west to Shuofang Commandery in the Ordos Plateau. His distant cousin, the Emperor of Han (Zhao), Liu Cong, acknowledged him as kin and gave him the title of Duke of Loufan. At the time, the Ordos had largely been abandoned by the Chinese dynasties since the fall of Han and became a dwelling space for a myriad of nomadic tribes. The Tiefu settled in their new home and grew into an influential clan in the region. However, they were constantly threatened by the Tuoba in the east, who were rewarded the princely fied of Dai by the Jin for their effort in quelling Liu Hu's rebellion. The Tiefu were often defeated in battle, which forced them to vacillate between submitting to the Dai and becoming vassals to the dynasties of the Central and Guanzhong Plains (Han-Zhao, Later Zhao and Former Qin).

The Tiefu and Tuoba conflict was particularly intense during the chieftaincy of Liu Weichen. In 376, he finally convinced his overlord, the Former Qin, to carry out a major campaign on the Dai. With Liu Weichen acting as their guide, the Qin conquered Dai, thereby unifying all of northern China, and rewarded him with the western half of the former Tuoba territory. During the collapse of Former Qin after the Battle of Fei River in 383, Liu Weichen re-asserted his autonomy over the Ordos from Shuofang and assembled a powerful force under him. In 391–392, he set his sights on subjugating the Tuoba tribe, who had reestablished their state as the Northern Wei. However, the campaign ended in disaster, and Liu Weichen was killed along with most of his tribe.

Liu Weichen's son, Liu Bobo, survived the fall of his tribe. He initially fled south to the Xuegan tribe, who then sent him to the Poduoluo. The chieftain of the Poduoluo, Moyigan, took Liu under his wing and gave him a daughter to marry. As the Qiang-led Later Qin dynasty closed in on unifying the Guanzhong region, the Qin began accepting submissions from tribes in the Ordos to form a buffer zone along their northern frontier. The Poduoluo was one these tribes, and in the early reign of Yao Xing, Liu Bobo was introduced to Yao, who sent him back to Shuofang and entrusted him as a major border commander.

During this period, the Northern Wei was rapidly rising in power and continued to ravage the Ordos tribes with their raids, leading to general unrest on the frontier. In retaliation, Yao Xing led an eastern expedition against the Wei, but suffered a decisive defeat at the Battle of Chaibi in 402. From then on, the Qin avoided further military engagements with the Wei and sought to mend their relationship through appeasements. In 407, Liu Bobo, angered by peace talks between Yao Xing and the Tuoba, raised an army in rebellion against the Qin, killing his father-in-law, Moyigan in an ambush and absorbing his tribe.

=== Reign of Helian Bobo ===
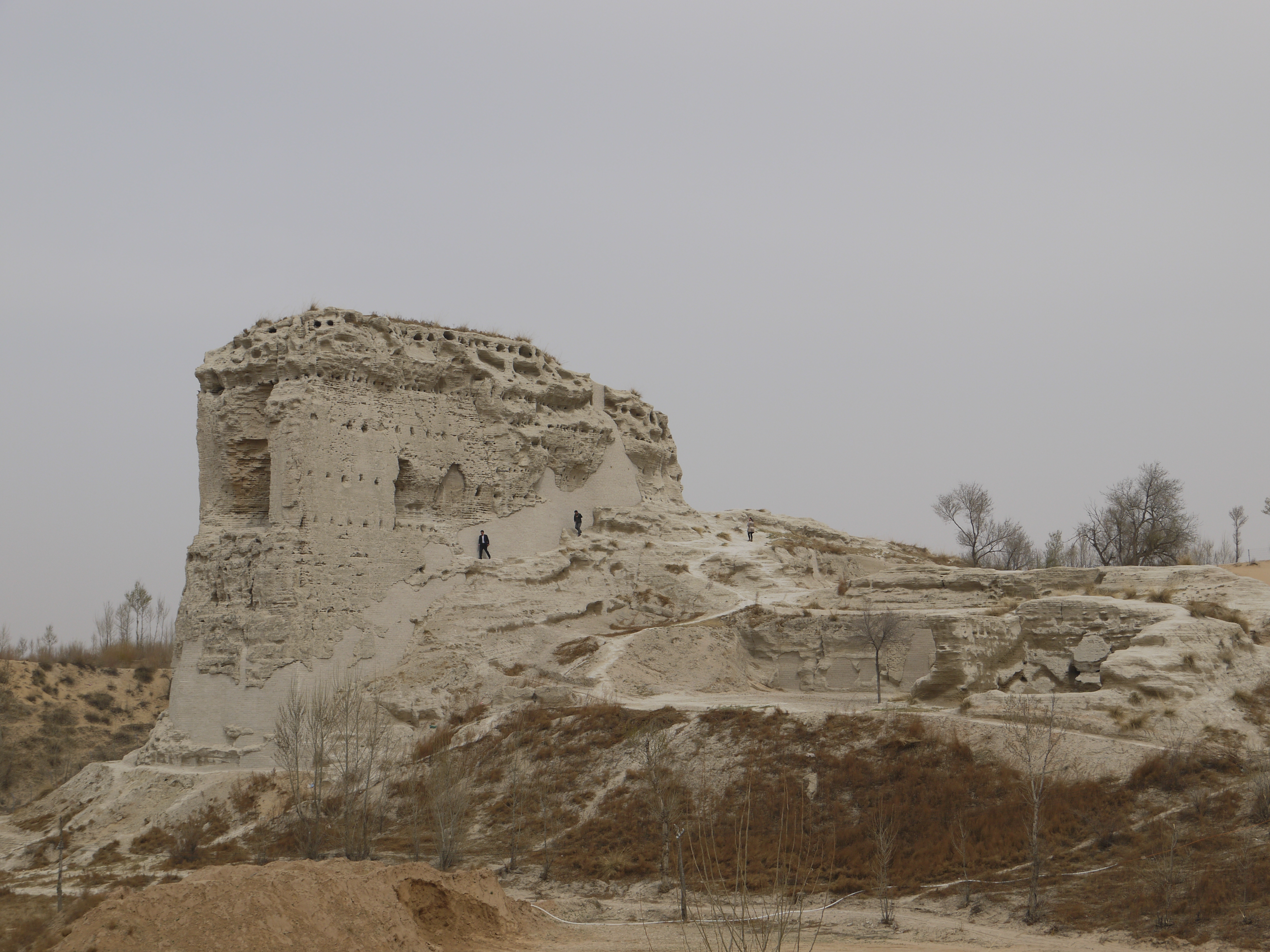
Remains of Tongwancheng

As the Xiongnu alleged that they descended from Yu the Great, Liu Bobo claimed descent from the Xia dynasty and founded his own state of Great Xia, claiming the titles of Heavenly King and Grand Chanyu. The same year, he led his army to subjugate and forcibly unite the tribes of Ordos, including the Xuegan. He also briefly fought with the Southern Liang after they rejected his offer for a marriage alliance, dealing them a debilitating defeat. Despite his grudge against the Northern Wei, Bobo mainly concentrated his military efforts on the Later Qin. He refused to establish a capital in his early reign, instead choosing to lead a roving army and attacking Qin's northern borders when they least expected.

In 413, Bobo, believing that it was inappropriate to claim lineage from the Han dynasty through his maternal line, changed his family name from Liu to the prestigious-sounding and Xiongnu-like family name of Helian. He also built his capital city of Tongwancheng at the southern edge of the Mu Us Desert. Construction of the city was reportedly brutal, with around 100,000 Han Chinese and tribal people being drafted to build the city. Remains of the city can still be seen today at Jingbian County, Shaanxi. In 414, Helian Bobo entered into an alliance with the Northern Yan in Liaoning, and in 415, with the Northern Liang in Gansu.

The war with Xia greatly drained the Qin economy and military, with many of their key generals being killed in battle. In 417, the Eastern Jin commander, Liu Yu, conquered Qin, but the situation back at the Jin capital forced him to return and leave behind his generals to defend the Guanzhong region. In 418, Bobo invaded the Guanzhong, and due to violent infighting among the Jin generals, he inflicted them a catastrophic defeat and captured the region.

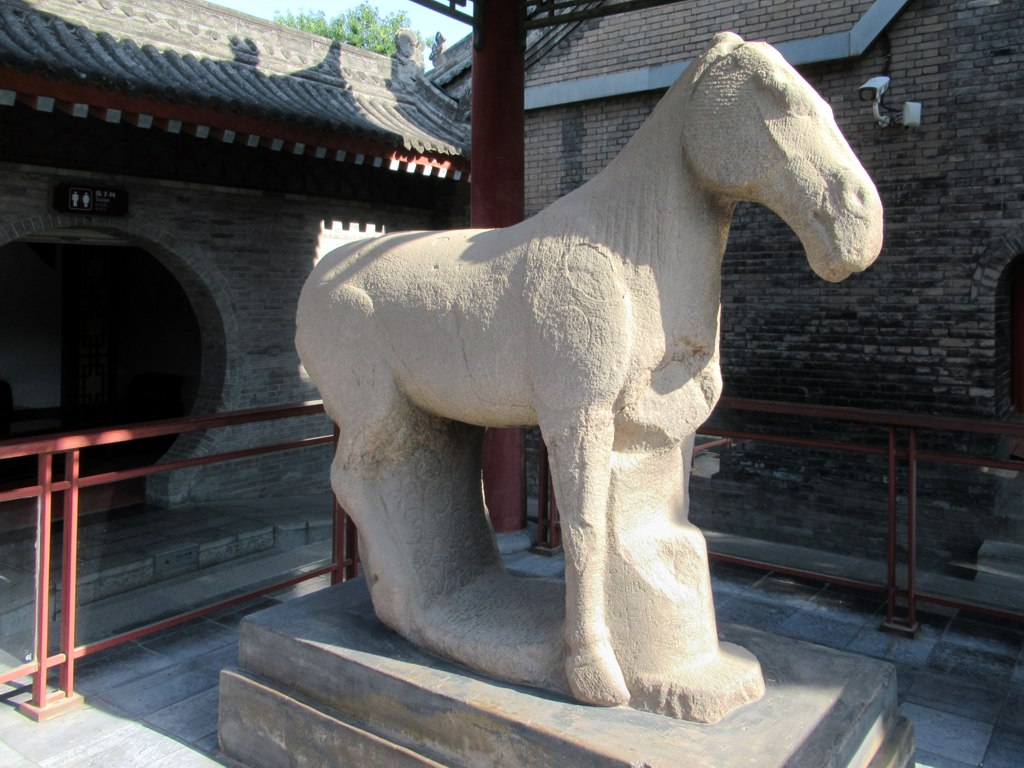
A stone horse in Xi'an, Shaanxi (modern Chang'an) carved during Helian Bobo's reign in 424.

In 419, Helian Bobo elevated himself to Emperor of Xia. Although the ancient capital, Chang’an, was under his control, he set up a Southern Administration there and kept Tongwancheng as his capital out of concern that the Northern Wei would invade the Ordos in his absence. Throughout his reign, Bobo is described in records as an extremely cruel ruler who often killed his subjects on impulse. In 424, a civil war broke out among his sons, which ended in him appointing Helian Chang as his new Crown Prince.

=== Decline and fall ===
After Helian Bobo's death in 425, the Northern Wei intensified their pressure on the Xia. While Helian Chang was away campaigning against the Western Qin, Wei carried out a surprise attack on Xia, capturing many cities in Guanzhong including Chang’an. In 427, as Xia attempted to recapture Chang’an, Wei launched a second attack and captured their capital at the Battle of Tongwancheng. Chang relocated to Shanggui, but after several more defeats, he was finally captured in battle in 428.

Helian Chang's brother, Helian Ding, declared himself the new emperor at Pingliang. In 431, as Wei continued their encroachment, he made a last-ditch effort to expand westwards. He conquered the weakened Western Qin, but on his way to invade Northern Liang, he was ambushed and captured by the Tuyuhun. Helian Ding's capture marked the end of the Xia, and in 432, he was turned over to Wei and executed. In 434, Helian Chang tried to escape west from Pingcheng but was intercepted and killed.

== Relations with the Dugu ==
Liu Hu's uncle was Liu Meng, who in 272 was killed by the Jin dynasty after he rebelled the previous year. While Hu's father Liu Gaoshengyuan took over their people, Meng's son, Liu Fulun fled to the Tuoba tribe. In 318, Fulun's son, Liu Lugu also surrendered to the Tuoba and was given a daughter by Tuoba Yulü to marry. Fulun's branch became known as the Dugu tribe (獨孤), and like the Tiefu, they were known as Wuhuan people due to their mixed ethnicity.

Yao Weiyuan suggested in the past that 'Dugu' was an alternate form of 'Tuge' (屠各), the Xiongnu aristocratic clan that had adopted the Han Chinese surname of Liu (劉), members of which also ruled the Former Zhao state. This writer further suggests that 'Tuge' is an alternate form of 'Tuhe' (徒河), which is the branch of the Xianbei from which the Murong were descended.

== Chieftains of the Tiefu and rulers of the Xia ==
Temple name	Posthumous names	Personal name	Durations of reign	Era names
Tiefu Tribe (309–407)
–		Liu Hu 劉虎	309–341	–
–		Liu Wuheng 劉務恆	341–356	–
–		Liu Eloutou 劉閼陋頭	356–358	–
–		Liu Xiwuqi 劉悉勿祈	358–359	–
–		Liu Weichen 劉衞辰	359–391	–
–		Liu Bobo	391–407	–
Xia (407–431)
Shizu	Wulie	Helian Bobo (same person as Liu Bobo)	407–425	Longsheng (龍升) 407–413; Fengxiang (鳳翔) 413–418; Changwu (昌武) 418–419; Zhenxing (眞興) 419–425
–		Helian Chang	425–428	Chengguang (承光) 425–428
–		Helian Ding	428–431	Shengguang (勝光) 428–431

== Rulers family tree ==
Xia

Qubei 去卑 d. ?; r. 216–?
Liu Meng 刘猛 d. 272	Liu; Gaoshengyuan 劉誥升爰 d. 309; r. ?–309
Liu Fulun 劉副崙	Liu Hu 劉虎 d. 341; r. 309–341
Liu Wuheng 劉務恒 d. 356; r. 341–356	Liu Eloutou 劉閼陋頭 r. 356–358
Liu Xiwuqi 劉悉勿祈 r. 358–359	Liu Weichen 劉衛辰 d. 391; r. 359–391
You Dedai 右地代	□	Li Qiti 力俟提	Ali Luoyin 阿利罗引	Zhi Lidi 直力鞮	Wei Fa 韦伐	Helian Bobo 赫連勃勃 b. 381– d. 425; Wulie 武烈 r. 407–425	Ruo Men 若门	Chi Yijian 叱以鞬	Yi Dou 乙斗	Wen Chen 文陈	□
Luo Tí 罗提	Helian; Zhuxing 赫連助興	Helian; Weiyidai 赫連謂以代	Helian; Duluogu 赫連度洛孤	Helian; Shegan 赫連社干	Helian; Wushiba 赫連烏視拔	Helian; Tugu 赫連禿骨	Helian; An 赫連安	Suruo; Dougen 宿若豆根	Yi Sheng 乙升
Helian; Gui 赫連璝 d. 424	Helian; Yan 赫連延	Helian Chang 赫連昌 d. 434; r. 425–428	Helian Lun 赫连伦 d. 424	Helian Ding 赫連定 d. 432; r. 428–431	Helian; Man 赫連滿	Empress Helian d. 453; Empress Taiwu 太武皇后 (432–452)	Su Dagan 宿沓干
daughter wife of Luo Ti 罗提	Helian; Douwuyu 赫连豆勿于	Su Shí 宿石
□	Su Ni 宿倪
Helian; Ziyue 赫连子悦
Helian; Zhungzhang 赫连仲章

== See also ==
- Xiongnu
- Wu Hu
- List of past Chinese ethnic groups
- Tongwan
- Xia dynasty
- Western Xia
- Monarchy of China
