= Guandi (disambiguation) =

Guandi may refer to:

- Guan Yu (died 220), general under Liu Bei in the late Han dynasty, later deified as a god known as Guandi
- Guandi, Inner Mongolia (官地), a town in Linxi County, Inner Mongolia, China
- Guandi, Jilin (官地), a town in Dunhua, Jilin, China
- Guandi Township (关堤乡), a township in Xinxiang, Henan, China
- Guandi Dam, a gravity dam on the Yalong River in Sichuan, China

== See also ==
- Guandimiao (关帝庙), a Shang dynasty archaeological site in Xingyang, Henan, China
