= Yulong =

Yulong may refer to:

- Yulong Naxi Autonomous County (Chinese: 玉龙纳西族自治县), of Lijiang, Yunnan
- Yulong Snow Mountain (Chinese: 玉龙雪山), or Jade Dragon Snow Mountain
- Yulong River (Chinese: 遇龙河), in Guangxi
- Yulongsi Formation, in Yunnan
- Yulong, Xingyang (Chinese: 豫龙镇), town in Xingyang City, Henan
- Yulong (dinosaur), a genus of oviraptorid dinosaur
- Yulong (Chinese: 宇龙), a Chinese mobile phone maker, a subsidiary of Coolpad Group.
- Yulong Copper Mine (Chinese: 玉龙铜矿), a mine of Western Mining Co., Ltd.
- An Yulong (born 1978), Chinese short-track speed skater

== See also ==
- Yu Long (Chinese: 余隆; pinyin: Yú Lóng; born 1964) Chinese music conductor
- Longyu (1868-1913) Dowager Empress of China
