= Deng Qiang =

4th century Former Qin general

- 鄧羌

General Who Guards the Army (鎮軍將軍)
- In office 371 – ?
- Monarch: Fu Jian

Personal details
- Born: Unknown Pingliang, Gansu
- Died: c. 379
- Relations: Deng Yu (ancestor)
- Children: Deng Jing; Deng Yi
- Peerage: Marquis of Zhending Commandery(真定郡侯)

Deng Qiang (died c.early 379) was a Chinese military general of the Former Qin dynasty during the Sixteen Kingdoms period. He came to prominence during the reign of Fu Sheng when he helped defeat and kill the Qiang warlord Yao Xiang, but for most of his career he would serve Sheng's successor, Fu Jian. He was a leading figure in the rise of Former Qin, along with Wang Meng, as he led Fu Jian's army to victory against Zhang Ping and Former Yan. He stamped out corruption in the government and put down the rebellions of Fu Jian's relatives and Zhang Yu (張育). He and his peer Zhang Ci were known as the "Enemies of Ten Thousands (萬人敵)", a title previously held by the generals Guan Yu and Zhang Fei during the end of the Han dynasty.

== Service under Fu Sheng ==
Deng Qiang was a native of Anding Commandery (安定郡; in modern-day Pingliang, Gansu) and his ancestor was said to have been Deng Yu, an Eastern Han dynasty general during the reign of Emperor Guangwu. He was described as having a brave personality, and excelled at horse riding and archery. He was also very fluent in the Art of War that during the reign of Fu Jian, he was instructed to teach it to Fu Jian's son, Fu Pi. His first recorded activity was in 356, serving as General Who Establishes Fortitude, when the Former Yan general Muyu Zhangqing (慕輿長卿) attacked Former Qin's Fort Peishi (裴氏堡, in modern day Yuanqu County, Shanxi). Fu Sheng ordered Deng Qiang to reinforce the fort, so he routed Zhangqing and captured him.

Later that year, Fu Sheng killed his uncle, Qiang Ping (強平), after the latter advised his nephew to change his violent behaviour. In protest, Deng Qiang, together with Fu Fei (苻飛) and Fu Huangmei (苻黃眉), performed obeisance and remonstrated him for killing his own uncle. Fu Sheng refused to listen to their concerns but respected their bravery. Instead of executing them, he had the three banished, with Deng Qiang being sent away to Xingyang.

=== Defeating Yao Xiang ===
The following year, Deng Qiang followed Fu Huangmei to defend Guanzhong against the Qiang warlord Yao Xiang. When the Qin forces arrived, Yao Xiang refused to give fight and instead held out at Huangluo (黃洛, in modern-day Tongchuan city, Shaanxi). Deng Qiang knew that Yao Xiang had been flustered by his recent defeats against Huan Wen and Zhang Ping, so he suggested to Huangmei that they beat their drums and march straight into his city to provoke him. Deng Qiang carried out his plans, inciting Yao Xiang to come out and give chase. Yao Xiang pursued Deng Qiang all the way to Sanyuan where Qin forces under Fu Huangmei and Fu Jian awaited them to ambush the Qiang. Deng turned his cavalry around and joined in the ambush. Yao Xiang suffered a great defeat and tried to withdraw, but he was killed during his attempt.

== Service under Fu Jian ==
=== War with Zhang Ping ===
Fu Sheng was overthrown and subsequently executed during a coup orchestrated by Fu Jian and his brother Fu Fa later that year. Deng Qiang would continue to serve the state following the regime change with Fu Jian as the new ruler. Also that same year, the Bingzhou warlord, Zhang Ping broke his allegiance to Former Qin and attempted to claim independence. In 358, Fu Jian led his troops to Fen River with Deng Qiang as his vanguard general. Zhang Ping sent out his adopted son, Zhang Ci, to battle the Qin forces. Deng Qiang and Zhang Ci fought for ten days, with neither side getting the upper hand. When Fu Jian moved to Tongbi (銅壁, in modern-day Tongchuan, Shaanxi), Zhang Ci charged into the Qin lines numerous times. In his last charge, he was struck by a spear from the Qin general Lü Guang, and Deng Qiang quickly subdued and brought him before Fu Jian. Zhang Ci's capture caused morale in Zhang Ping's army to collapse, so Ping quickly surrendered back to Qin.

=== Quelling revolts and corruption ===
In 359, Deng Qiang campaigned against the rebel Gao Li (高離) in Lüeyang and vanquished him. Later, he was appointed as Middle Assistant to the Imperial Secretary and worked close with Fu Jian's advisor Wang Meng. The two worked very well with each other and within a matter of weeks, they purged the government of corrupted officials and nobles while solving mismanaged law cases. Fu Jian was very pleased with this and exclaimed, "Now I know what a land ruled by law is like!"

In an unspecified year, Zhang Wang (張罔), a member of the Chuge people, rebelled after gathering thousands of people as well as declaring himself the Grand Chanyu. As Zhang invaded and plundered numerous counties and commanderies, Deng Qiang was reappointed as General Who Establishes Fortitude, and with 7,000 soldiers, he managed to quell Zhang's rebellion. In 365, the chieftains, Cao Gu and Liu Weichen rebelled against Qin. While Fu Jian led the army against Cao Gu, Deng Qiang fought and captured Weichen at Mount Mugen (木根山; north of present-day Yulin, Shaanxi) in Shuofang. Peace was restored after the chieftains agreed to submit back to Qin. In 366, Deng Qiang also participated in Wang Meng's campaign against the Longxi warlord, Li Yan, and was awarded the offices of General Who Establishes Martial Might and Inspector of Luozhou for his contributions.

=== Rebellion of the Four Dukes ===
In 368, a major rebellion broke out led by Fu Jian's cousins, Fu Liu (苻柳), Fu Sou (苻廋) and Fu Wu (苻武), and his brother, Fu Shuang (苻雙). Deng Qiang and Wang Meng were tasked in defeating Fu Liu, who had made Puban (蒲阪, in modern-day Yuncheng, Shanxi) his base. Fu Liu left his son Fu Liang (苻良) to guard the city while he marched towards Chang'an to capture it. Deng Qiang caught him by surprise with a night raid, forcing him to retreat. Wang Meng then intercepted his retreat, leaving Fu Liu with only a few hundred men back to his base. Wang Meng and Deng Qiang easily captured Puban and executed Fu Liu before joining Zhang Ci and Yang An in their assault against Fu Sou at Shancheng (陝城, in modern Sanmenxia, Henan). After all four rebels had been defeated, Deng Qiang was appointed General Who Establishes Valor and Inspector of Luozhou (洛州, covered parts of modern-day Henan and Shanxi).

=== Conquest of Former Yan ===
The following year, the Jin dynasty Grand Marshal, Huan Wen, led his troops to conquer Former Yan. At the advice of Wang Meng, Fu Jian decided to support Yan to prevent Jin from gaining significant land in the north. Fu Jian sent Deng Qiang and Gou Chi (苟池) to Shancheng to reinforce Yan and oversee the upcoming battle between the two sides. Yan managed to repel Jin thanks to the efforts of Murong Chui at the Battle of Fangtou but must now deal with Qin's demands. Yan had initially promised to Qin that they would surrender Hulao to them but retracted their statement, giving Fu Jian a pretext to invade them. Fu Jian had Deng Qiang, Wang Meng and Liang Chen (梁琛) capture Luoyang, which fell the following year. Shortly after, Deng defeated Murong Zang (慕容臧) at Xingyang.

An altercation nearly broke between Deng Qiang and Wang Meng during the war. Wang Meng intended to execute the general Xu Cheng (徐成) for returning late from scouting. Deng Qiang, who came from the same commandery as Xu, defended him, stating that Qin needs to preserve its numbers, even more so since Xu Cheng is a high-ranking officer. Wang Meng argued in favor of upholding military laws but Deng Qiang further advocated that Xu Cheng be redeemed by fighting the Yan forces in the upcoming battle. Even then, Wang Meng refused, causing Deng Qiang to rally his men against Wang Meng. Wang was impressed by Deng's dedication to protect Xu Cheng and finally pardoned him. Deng Qiang also apologised and the two reconciled.

As Wang Meng and Murong Ping's armies came face to face at the Battle of Luchuan (潞川, in modern-day Changzhi, Shanxi), Wang Meng placed his trust in Deng Qiang to rout them despite Qin's inferior numbers. However, another disagreement occurred between the two. Deng Qiang wanted Wang Meng to appoint him Colonel-Director of Retainers after he wins, but Wang Meng pointed out that he did not have the power to do so, although he tried to compensate him with Administrator of Anding and a Marquis of ten thousand households. Deng Qiang withdrew unsatisfied and when the battle began, he was still asleep in his camp. Wang Meng quickly rode to his tent and made a compromise with Deng. When all was settled, Deng Qiang drank heavily before setting out with Zhang Ci and Xu Cheng. He personally charged into the enemy lines several times and killed several of the Yan troops. By noon, the Yan forces were annihilated and Murong Ping fled alone to Yecheng.

Deng Qiang's last merit in the war would be at Xindu, where he defeated Murong Huan (慕容桓). After Qin conquered Yan, he was rewarded by Fu Jian with Credential Bearer, General Who Conquers The Caitiffs, Administrator of Anding and Marquis of Zhending Commandery (真定, in modern-day Shijiazhuang, Hebei). In 371, Wang Meng decided to honour his promise at Lu River and asked Fu Jian to make Deng Qiang Director of Retainers. However, Fu Jian believed that Deng Qiang deserves better for his past merits as well, and made him General Who Guards the Army and honored him as Specially Advanced.

=== Zhang Yu and Yang Guang's rebellion ===
In 373, Former Qin conquered the region of Yizhou and Liangzhou from the Jin dynasty. However, one year later, two natives, Zhang Yu and Yang Guang (楊光), rebelled and tried to set up their state with the aid of Jin. Fu Jian dispatched Deng Qiang to destroy them while Jin sent Zhu Yao (竺瑤) and Huan Shiqian, who defeated Yao Chang and forced him to retreat to Wucheng (五城, around present-day Guanghan, Sichuan). Zhang Yu declared himself King of Shu and besieged Chengdu. However, Zhang Yu began to quarrel with his peers and followers and they all started fighting one another. With the rebels disunified, Deng Qiang and Yang An quickly routed them, causing Zhang Yu and Yang Guang to pull out to Mianzhu. Deng proceeded to defeat Zhu Yao and Huan Shiqian in the west before finally claiming Zhang Yu and Yang Guang's heads at Mianzhu. Before he left, Deng Qiang carved a stele at the Min Mountains.

Fu Jian had long appreciated Deng Qiang but his recent victory in Yizhou impressed him very much. After Deng Qiang returned from Chengdu, Fu Jian summoned him to the palace, where he told him, "Long ago, your ancestor Zhonghua (Deng Yu) met with Han Shizu (Emperor Guangwu of Han). Now, you too have met me. How fortunate of the Deng clan." Deng Qiang replied, "I've always told myself that it was Guangwu who met Zhonghua, not Zhonghua who met Guangwu." Fu Jian laughed and said to him, "If it is as you say, then it is not you who's fortunate, but me for meeting such a worthy man."

=== Final years ===
In 376, Deng Qiang, Zhang Ci and others led 200,000 infantry and cavalry troops to accompany the Grand Commander of the Northern Expedition, Fu Luo, in his conquest of the Dai state. After the fall of Dai, he was awarded the office of Inspector of Bingzhou. His final appearance in history would be in 378 during Fu Jian's grand siege of Xiangyang, serving as the vanguard general in attacking Fancheng with Yang An. Details of his merits in the siege are not known, and his name ceases to appear in records from this point on. It could be inferred that Deng Qiang died sometime during the campaign, as Zhang Ci succeeded him in his office of Inspector of Bingzhou in c.March 379.

== Children ==
Deng Qiang had several sons, all of who were praised for their upright characters, but only two of them were recorded: Deng Jing (鄧景) and Deng Yi (鄧翼). Deng Jing's only known event was in 386, when he raised troops in support of Fu Pi after he succeeded Fu Jian. Jing captured Peng Pond (彭池, west of Chang'an) and together with Dou Chong he led the frontlines against Later Qin and was made Intendant of Jingzhao.

Deng Yi was the younger of the two and was serving as Chancellor of Hejian prior to the Battle of Fei River in 383. When Murong Chui revolted and formed Later Yan in 384, he appointed Yi as General of the Rear, Inspector of Jizhou and Marquis of Zhending. However, Yi cried and said, "My late father was loyal to the house of Qin, so why should I rebel? No loyal minister has served two lords since ancient times. I dare not heed your orders." Chui consoled him by saying, "Though our family names differ, your father and I were close like brothers, and so I see you much like a son. Are you now content to leave?" Yi eventually decided to join Chui, but asked him to find a better candidate to serve as Inspector of Jizhou. Yi was thus created General Who Establishes Martial Might, Prefect of Hejian and Assistant of the Left of the Masters of Writing, all of which he served with distinction before he died in office as Interior Minister of Zhao.

Deng Yi's son Deng Yuan would serve Northern Wei after Wei took the Central Plains from Yan. Yuan was a notable minister under Emperor Daowu who kickstarted Wei's history recording project but was forced to commit suicide in 403 because of his cousin, Deng Hun (鄧暉), who was closely associated with the He clan that defected to Later Qin that year. Despite that, Deng Qiang's descendents continued to serve Northern Wei for multiple generations.
