= Conquest of Former Yan by Former Qin =

- Part of the Eastern Jin and Sixteen Kingdoms period
Date	January – December 370
Location	Henan and Hebei
Result	Qin victory; Fall of Yan

Belligerents
Former Qin	Former Yan

Commanders and leaders
Fu Jian; Wang Meng	Murong Wei (surrendered); Murong Ping (surrendered)

Strength
90,000 (Wang Meng); 100,000 (Fu Jian)	300,000

Casualties and losses
Unknown	163,000+

Conquest of Former Yan by Former Qin
- Traditional Chinese: 前秦滅前燕之戰
- Simplified Chinese: 前秦灭前燕之战
Transcriptions
Standard Mandarin
- Hanyu Pinyin: Qiánqín Miè Qiányàn Zhī Zhàn

The conquest of Former Yan by Former Qin, also known as the conquest of Yan by Qin, was a military campaign launched by the Former Qin dynasty against the state of Former Yan from January to December 370 during the Sixteen Kingdoms period of China. The campaign concluded in the fall of Yan, establishing Qin dominance over northern China and beginning their rapid attempt at unifying China.

== Prelude ==
Following the fall of the Later Zhao dynasty, a new tripartite equilibrium took shape in China consisting of the Eastern Jin in the south, the Former Qin in the northwest and the Former Yan in the northeast. In 369, the Jin commander, Huan Wen launched a grand expedition to conquer Yan, which shook the Yan capital in Ye. Out of desperation, the Yan allied with the Qin, and at the decisive Battle of Fangtou, they defeated and drove out Huan Wen's forces from the north.

Before agreeing to the alliance, the Heavenly King of Qin, Fu Jian was hesitant at first, but his Prime Minister, Wang Meng successfully persuaded him. Wang Meng told him in private that Huan Wen posed a bigger threat, and even if Yan survives the invasion, they would require some time to recover, during which Qin could take advantage of them. In return for their aid, the Yan promised to cede land west of Hulao, including the strategic region around Luoyang.

Murong Chui, who oversaw the victory at Fangtou, returned to Yan as a national hero, but behind the scenes, suspicion between him and the emperor, Murong Wei's inner circle had only deepen. The emperor's great-uncle and regent, Murong Ping, and Empress Kezuhun feared that Chui would use his newfound reputation to undermine their power. They refused to reward him and his generals and plotted to have him executed instead. When the plot leaked to Chui, he initially planned to flee to the old Yan capital at Longcheng, where he could negotiate a compromise, but after his son, Murong Lin betrayed him by informing the imperial court of his plans, he fled west and defected to the Qin.

Part of Fu Jian's concerns in invading Yan was his fear of Murong Chui's military prowess, so he was estatic when Chui surrendered. Ever since the death of the previous competent regent, Murong Ke, corruption was ever rampant in Yan. Among other examples, the Yan nobility concealed many households from the civil registry and levied heavy taxes for their private treasury at the expense of the central government and common people. When the Yan envoy to Qin, Liang Chen, returned from his mission, he warned Murong Ping of an imminent invasion, but Ping, believing that Qin was too small to pose a threat, refused to listen. Finally, when Yan refused to cede the land they promised to Qin, Fu Jian used it as his pretext to launch his invasion.

== The campaign ==
=== Capture of Luoyang ===
In January 370, Fu Jian ordered Wang Meng, the General Who Establishes Might, Liang Cheng and the Inspector of Si Province, Deng Qiang to invade Yan with 30,000 soldiers. Qin forces besieged Luoyang, and in response, the Yan court dispatched the General-in-Chief, Murong Zang (慕容臧) to relieve the city. Zang defeated a Qin force at Shimen (石門; near present-day Xingyang, Henan) and captured the general, Yang Meng (楊猛). When he camped at Xingyang, Wang Meng sent Liang Cheng and Deng Qiang to repel him. They defeated Zang and killed 10,000 of his soldiers. In a subsequent battle, Liang Cheng defeated Zang at Shimen, capturing 3,000 soldiers and the general, Yang Qu (楊璩). Zang retreated to Xinle (新樂; in present-day Xinxiang, Henan), where he fortified the area with walls before withdrawing.

Meanwhile, Wang Meng sent a letter to Luoyang's commander, Murong Zhu (慕容築), who reportedly only had 300 tired soldiers at his disposal. He falsely told him that Fu Jian's forces was capturing Ye, and that all his escape routes have been cut off. Frightened, Murong Zhu surrendered the city. Wang Meng left Deng Qiang to defend Jinyong (金墉, near modern Luoyang) before returning to the Qin capital, Chang'an with his forces.

=== Siege of Huguan and Jinyang ===
In June or July 370, Fu Jian reinforced Wang Meng with 60,000 soldiers under the General Who Guards the South, Yang An and the Tiger's Teeth General, Zhang Ci among others to resume with his invasion. On 21 July, he escorted Wang Meng to Bashang (灞上, between present-day Baqiao District and Lantian County of Xi'an, Shaanxi), where he laid out the war plan; capture Huguan county, then pacify Shangdang Commandery before heading straight to Ye, all in quick succession.

Wang Meng led his forces to attack Huguan while Yang An laid siege on Jinyang. To deal with the latest intrusion, Murong Wei ordered Murong Ping to march out with the main army consisting of 300,000 selected soldiers. In addition, the Prince of Yidu, Murong Huan also camped at Shating (沙亭; southeast of present-day Daming County, Hebei) with 10,000 soldiers as reserves for Murong Ping. The Yan emperor was concerned by the invasion at first, but was then convinced that the full might of the Yan force would be enough to turn the Qin forces away.

In August or September, Wang Meng captured Huguan along with the Administrator of Shangdang, Murong Yue (慕容越). As he travelled through the surrounding counties and commanderies, the Yan people did not resist and surrendered. Yang An had more trouble at Jinyang, as the city had more soldiers and was well-supplied, so Wang Meng left the Colonel of the Garrison Cavalry, Gou Chang to defend Huguan while he aided the siege. On 15 October, the Qin army dug tunnels under the city walls. Zhang Ci secretly led a few hundred men through these tunnels and was able to break open the gates from the inside. Wang Meng and Yang An soon entered and captured the Inspector of Bing province, Murong Zhuang (慕容莊).

=== Battle of Luchuan ===
While Huguan and Jinyang fell, Murong Ping did not advance, instead camping at Luchuan (潞川; around present-day Lucheng District, Changzhi). On 14 November, Wang Meng garrisoned the general, Mao Dang at Jinyang to confront Murong Ping's army at Luchuan, where a stalemate ensued.

On 25 November, Wang Meng sent the general, Xu Cheng to scout the Yan camp and return by noon. However, he returned at dusk instead, so Wang Meng angrily ordered his execution. Deng Qiang, who was from the same hometown as Xu Cheng, pleaded for leniency, but Wang Meng was adamant in upholding the military law. Deng Qiang returned to his camp and ordered his soldiers to beat the drums and arm themselves, threatening a mutiny. After enquiring Deng Qiang about his behaviour, Wang Meng decided to spare Xu Cheng, so the two men apologized to each other.

In the Yan camp, Murong Ping surmized that the Qin, having penetrated deep into Yan territory, would rather avoid battle to consolidate their gains. In a puzzling decision, records state that he closed off all the surrounding forests and springs, after which he began charging his own soldiers money and silk in exchange for firewood and water, naturally sparking outrage in his army. When his scouts informed him of what was happening, Wang Meng dispatched the Guerilla General, Guo Qing, with 5,000 cavalry on a raid. By utilizing a secret route, Guo Qing reached the rear of the Yan camp and set fire to their baggage train.

The fire could be seen all the way from Ye, which alarmed Murong Wei. He sent his Palace Attendant, Lan Yi (蘭伊) to Murong Ping, ordering him to redistribute the money and silk back to his soldiers and fight the Qin army at once. Ping fearfully complied and wrote a message to Wang Meng offering him to pitch their armies against each other in battle.

On 27 November, Wang Meng gathered his soldiers at Weiyuan and delivered a rallying speech. The Qin army was in high spirit, smashing their pots and leaving their food supply behind before advancing with a great roar. However, Wang Meng had another incident with Deng Qiang right before the battle where the latter demanded him the office of Colonel-Director of Retainers if they win. Wang Meng offered him a marquis title and the position of Administrator of Anding instead, but Deng Qiang, dissatisfied, withdrew to his camp. When the battle began, Deng Qiang was sleeping and ignored Wang Meng's summons.

In the end, Wang Meng quickly rode to his camp and agreed to his initial request. Deng Qiang drank heavily in his camp before departing. With their horses and lances, Deng Qiang, Zhang Ci and Xu Cheng led their men to charge in and out of the Yan formation, slaying and wounding hundreds of Yan soldiers in their way. By noon, the Yan had suffered a great defeat, as 50,000 of their troops were either killed or captured. The remaining soldiers scattered and plundered the neighbouring counties and commanderies as they fled. The Qin army pursued them, capturing and killing a further 100,000 soldiers. Murong Ping had to escape back to Ye alone, while Murong Huan led the reserves at Shating to Neihuang (內黃, in modern Anyang, Henan).

=== Fall of Ye ===
Wang Meng pressed on to Ye, and along the way, he provided aid to the areas affected by the recent acts of the Yan soldiers. He also forbid his men from plundering and was fair in upholding the law, thus restoring order. The Yan people welcomed their invaders and even compared Wang Meng to Murong Ke, who was widely beloved during his lifetime. On 30 November, Wang Meng placed Ye under siege. Fu Jian also left Chang'an with 100,000 troops to join the siege, but after a secret visit from Wang Meng, he decided to act as reserves at Anyang. On 10 December, he also ordered Deng Qiang to attack Murong Huan, and the Yan prince fled with 5,000 soldiers to Longcheng. On 11 December, Yeoul, a former Buyeo prince serving as a Regular Mounted Attendant under Yan, opened the northern city gates and welcomed the Qin army.

Murong Wei, Murong Ping and a handful of retainers all fled Ye towards Longcheng, while Fu Jian entered the city palace on 14 December. Although they left with more than a thousand guards, many of them abandoned the group until there was only a few dozen escorts. Fu Jian sent Guo Qing to chase after the party. Murong Wei was ambushed at Fulu, but was able to make it as far as Gaoyang on foot before he was captured by Guo Qing. He was then brought to Ye before Fu Jian, who pardoned him and allowed him to lead his officials in giving a formal surrender.

When Guo Qing arrived at Longcheng, Murong Ping ran to Goguryeo, where he was apprehended and handed over to Qin. Meanwhile, Murong Huan had the commander at Longcheng, Murong Liang (慕容亮), killed and absorbed his army. He then made his way to Liaodong, not knowing that the local administrator, Han Chou had surrendered to Qin. Huan attempted to fight his way into the city but was unsuccessful, and as he abandoned his army, he was captured and killed by Guo Qing's subordinate, Zhu Yi (朱嶷).

== Aftermath ==
With the formal surrender of the imperial family, the rest of Former Yan's territory also submitted to Former Qin. Fu Jian celebrated the occasion by issuing a general amnesty, as well as promoting Wang Meng and the generals that participated in the campaign. Many of the old Yan officials kept their offices, while Murong Wei and his family were even integrated into the Qin administration. Wei, along with several of his relatives and 40,000 Xianbei subjects were relocated to live around the Chang'an region.

The fall of Yan established the Qin as the sole hegemonic power in northern China and began their rapid expansion to unify the whole of China. The Former Liang and Dai were powerless to stop their momentum, and in 376, they were both extinguished by the Qin. Fu Jian also concentrated his effort to the south, conquering Chouchi and a significant portion of the Eastern Jin. However, although Fu Jian was happy to allow the Murong-Xianbei to serve under him, Wang Meng warned him that they may pose a threat one day, and that Qin's hold on their former territory was far from secure. Indeed, after the disastrous Battle of Fei River in 383, the Murong would rebel against Qin to restore their state, with Murong Chui founding the Later Yan, and Murong Hong founding the Western Yan.

== Sources ==
- Schreiber, Gerhard (1956), "THE HISTORY OF THE FORMER YEN DYNASTY 前 燕 (285-370)", Monumenta Serica, vol. 15, no. 1, JSTOR, pp. 1–141, JSTOR 40725523
- Killigrew, John W. (2013), "The Role of the Moushi 谋士 in the Jin Shu and Wei Shu During the Northern Kingdoms Period, 309–450 AD", Journal of Asian History, vol. 47, no. 2, JSTOR, pp. 151–96, doi:10.13173/jasiahist.47.2.0151
- Book of Jin
- Zizhi Tongjian
