= Yin Wei =

Later Qin dynasty Military General (d. pre-412)

- 尹緯

Left Supervisor of the Affairs of the Masters of Writing (尚書左僕射)
- In office ?–?
- Monarch: Yao Xing

Personal details
- Born: Unknown Gangu County, Gansu
- Died: Before 412
- Courtesy name: Jingliang (景亮)
- Peerage: Marquis of Qinghe (清河侯)
- Posthumous name: Zhongcheng (忠成)

Yin Wei (fl.384–412), courtesy name Jingliang, was a Chinese official and military general of the Later Qin dynasty during the Sixteen Kingdoms period. Following the Battle of Fei River in 384, he convinced and supported the Qiang general, Yao Chang into rebelling against the Former Qin to form the Later Qin. As a founding minister of the dynasty, he served as a chief advisor to Yao Chang and later his son and successor, Yao Xing. In 394, he led the Later Qin to an important victory at the Battle of Feiqiao, effectively destroying the Former Qin's power and establishing the Later Qin as hegemon over the Guanzhong Plain.

== Early life and career ==
Yin Wei was from the Yin clan of Tianshui Commandery. According to his biography in the Book of Jin, he had a tall and robust physique, being eight chi tall (approximately 2 m (6.6 ft)) with an imposing thick waist. He was described as ambitious from a young age, but had no interest in business or wealth, and had a forthright personality. He was an admirer of the Eastern Wu minister, Zhang Zhao, and was often envious whenever he read about the achievements of past Prime Ministers.

In 357, his kinsman, Yin Chi (尹赤), who served as the Former Qin Inspector of Bing province, surrendered his territory to the Qiang warlord, Yao Xiang. As a result, members of the Yin clan were barred from holding government office for many years. Yin Wei was only allowed to receive his first position as a Gentleman of the Personnel Bureau at a late age, but even then, he was not trusted by his superiors due to his blunt and steadfast approach.

A story in his biography tells that in the final years of Fu Jian's reign, an ominous star reportedly appeared in the Eastern Well Constellation. Yin Wei interpreted this phenomenon as a sign that Fu Jian will soon meet his demise. He kowtowed to the heavens twice in joy, but he then began to cry and deeply sighed. His friend, Huan Shi (桓識) was puzzled about his reaction and asked him why he was that way. Yin said, "The time has come for the Hegemon King to soar like a dragon and for our kind to stand ready with our staffs. Yet, kindred spirits are hard to come by, and I fear I will never realize my full potential and ambition. My feelings are thus mixed with joy and sorrow."

== Career under Later Qin ==
=== Founding the Later Qin ===
In 384, the Former Qin began to collapse in the aftermath of their disastrous defeat at the Battle of Fei River. Fu Jian and his capital, Chang'an came under attack from the Western Yan, led by Murong Hong and then Murong Chong. Fu Jian sent his son, Fu Rui (苻叡) and the Qiang general, Yao Chang (brother of Yao Xiang) to drive them away, but Fu Rui was killed in battle. Fu Jian blamed Yao Chang for the defeat and threatened to kill him, so Yao Chang fled north of the Wei river to hide in the horse pastures. Seeing Yao Chang's situation, Yin Wei rallied the local Chinese gentry and Qiang tribes to support him, soon gathering about 50,000 families led by Yin Xiang (尹詳), Pang Yan (龐演) and others under his wing.

Yin Wei and his allies elected Yao Chang as their leader, but Yao Chang initially refused to accept their offer. Yin Wei approached him and said, "We are now far past the 106th day festival, and the signs of the Qin's demise are crystal clear. General, your heaven-sent prowess and abilities are worthy of leading us through these trying times. That is why the heroes have flocked to you with respect and admiration. Your Excellency should humble yourself and heed the will of the masses, for we cannot sit idly by and watch them sink further into despair." Thus, Yao Chang followed Yin Wei's advice and declared himself Everlasting King of Qin, appointing Yin Wei as his Marshal of the Right.

In 385, after a year of Western Yan siege, Fu Jian left Chang'an in search of food, leading to his defeat and capture by Yao Chang. To force Fu Jian into giving up the imperial seal, Yao Chang sent Yin Wei to persuade him, but Fu Jian remained persistent. During their talks, Fu Jian asked Yin Wei, "What position did you hold in my court?" Yin Wei replied, "Clerk of the Masters of Writing." Fu Jian lamented, "You possess the quality of a Prime Minister, comparable to Wang Jinglüe (Wang Meng). Yet I did not know who you were; is it not fitting for me to perish?" In the end, Yao Chang had Fu Jian strangled.

=== Advising Yao Chang ===
In 386, Yao Chang entered Chang'an and elevated himself to Emperor of (Later) Qin. Yin Wei was promoted to Supervisor of the Left. In 387, when Yao Chang planned to rescue the Administrator of Pingyi, Lan Du (蘭櫝) from the Former Qin general, Fu Shinu (苻師奴) and Western Yan forces, Yin Wei warned him that the Former Qin emperor, Fu Deng would attack their rear in his absence. Yao Chang believed that Fu Deng’s vast army would be too slow to carry out such an attack and went ahead with his initial plan, which ended in success.

As the war between Yao Chang and Fu Deng dragged on, there was fear that the local gentry families and tribes were beginning to lose confidence in the Later Qin. Yin Wei and Yao Huang (姚晃) consulted the minister, Gucheng Shen (古成詵) of Nan'an Commandery for advice on what needed to be done. Gucheng assured them that Yao Chang's victory was imminent, as his only real threat were Fu Deng, the Duke of Chouchi, Yang Ding and the Qiang chieftain, Lei Wudi, all of who had their own respective weaknesses. He contends that they should lie in wait for the right moment to strike, and in the meantime, they should focus on ruling virtuously, recruiting talents and drilling their troops and horses. Yin Wei relayed his words to Yao Chang, who was pleased and enfeoffed Gucheng Shen as a Marquis.

In 391, Yao Chang set out from Yinmi (陰密; west of modern-day Lingtai County, Gansu) to oppose Fu Deng at Anding. The general, Gou Yao (苟曜), who previously surrendered to Yao Chang, was planning to defect to Fu Deng's side. Yao Chang knew about his intentions, so he warned his son and Crown Prince, Yao Xing, who was guarding Chang'an, to arrest and execute him when he comes to visit. Surely enough, Gou Yao arrived at Chang'an, and Yao Xing ordered Yin Wei to arrest him. Yin Wei denounced Gou before executing him.

In 392, while out on the front, Yao Chang was made bedridden by an illness, so he summoned Yao Xing and placed Yin Wei in charge of defending Chang'an. The following year, Fu Deng and his rebel general, Dou Chong entered a stalemate at Fort Yeren (野人堡, in modern Pucheng County, Shaanxi). Dou Chong requested reinforcements from the Later Qin. Yin Wei suggested to Yao Chang that Yao Xing should take command of the operation to enhance his prestige in the military. Yao Chang agreed and dispatched the crown prince, who achieved a great victory before returning to Chang'an.

=== Battle of Feiqiao ===
In 394, Yao Chang was deathly ill and summoned Yin Wei, Yao Huang (姚晃), Yao Damu (姚大目) and Di Bozhi (狄伯支) to his palace. He gave the four men his dying wishes and entrusted them with great responsibility over the government after his death. He also advised Yao Xing to treat them respectfully and not to accept any advice that would harm them. After Yao Chang's death, Yao Xing appointed Yin Wei as his chief clerk.

Not long after, Fu Deng, taking advantage of the mourning period, launched a major invasion on the Later Qin, gathering his forces near Feiqiao (廢橋; in present-day Xingping, Shaanxi). The Later Qin administrator of Shiping, Yao Xiáng (姚詳) occupied Fort Mawei (馬嵬堡) to mount a defense against the Former Qin. Yao Chang reinforced him by sending Yin Wei with an infantry force. Heeding Yao Xiang's advice, Yin Wei occupied Feiqiao, blocking Fu Deng's advance and cutting him off from his water supply. Fu Deng launched a vicious assault on Yin Wei's position but was unsuccessful, and about two to three tenths of his soldiers died of thirst.

Hearing the situation on the battlefield, Yao Xing sent Di Bozhi to instruct Yin Wei to hold fast to his defences. However, Yin Wei rebuked, "Our Late Emperor had just ascended the Heavens, and the people are filled with fear and uncertainty. If we do not expend our utmost effort in eradicating this tyrant now, then our grand vision will be lost. I shall fight to the death." He then sallied forth to attack Fu Deng and won a decisive victory in the evening, causing Fu Deng to flee back to Yong province. The victory at Feiqiao allowed Yao Xing to smoothly ascend the throne, and months later, he would annihilate Fu Deng's forces and secure the Guanzhong region.

=== Later career ===
In 397, Yao Xing's mother, Empress Dowager She died, and Yao Xing entered a mourning period that exceeded the duration set by the rites and caused him to neglect state affairs. His court insisted that he uphold the precedents set by the Han and Cao Wei dynasties by ending the period once the funeral had taken place. One minister, Li Song (李嵩), proposed that Yao Xing should set a new example by continuing to wear his mourning clothes after the burial. Yin Wei accused Li of attempting to distort the rites and urged Yao Xing to have him tried for his crime. However, Yao Xing disregarded Yin and followed Li's advice.

Later that year, the Xianbei, Taixifu of the Xuegan tribe, with support from the Hu tribes of Shang Commandery and Ercheng (貳城; northwest of present-day Huangling County, Shaanxi), laid siege to Yao Xiáng at Jincheng. In response, Yao Xing sent Yin Wei and Yao Chong (姚崇) to reinforce him. When Taixifu personally arrived at Jincheng from Sanjiao (三交), Yao Chong set up camps to impede on his advance. However, during the campaign, the Later Qin forces were cut off from their tax revenues and supply lines, causing widespread hunger among their soldiers. Yin Wei informed Yao Chong that the rear generals Mijie Gaodi (彌姐高地), Du Cheng (杜成) and others were all from well-off families, and yet have led the armies to this predicament. He suggested that Yao send out letters ordering their execution to command respect. Yao Chong agreed, and after their executions, the other leaders were cowed into sending more than 500,000 in taxes. Yao Xing then led 20,000 troops to join the campaign, defeating Taixifu and forcing him to seek refuge with Moyigan of the Poduoluo tribe. Moyigan had Taixifu arrested instead and sent him back to the Later Qin.

=== Death and posthumous honours ===
From this point on, Yin Wei successively served as General Who Assists the State, Colonel-Director of Retainer and Left Supervisor of the Masters of Writing. He was also enfeoffed as the Marquis of Qinghe, the same title held by Wang Meng of the Former Qin. When he died, Yao Xing mourned him greatly, posthumously appointing him Minister Over the Masses and giving him the posthumous name of "Zhongcheng" (忠成). It is not recorded when Yin Wei died, but he must have died in or before 412. That year, Yin Wei was one of the twenty-four late subjects enshrined by Yao Xing in the ancestral temple of Yao Chang.
