= Xingyang railway station =

Railway station in Xingyang, Zhengzhou, China

Xingyang 荥阳
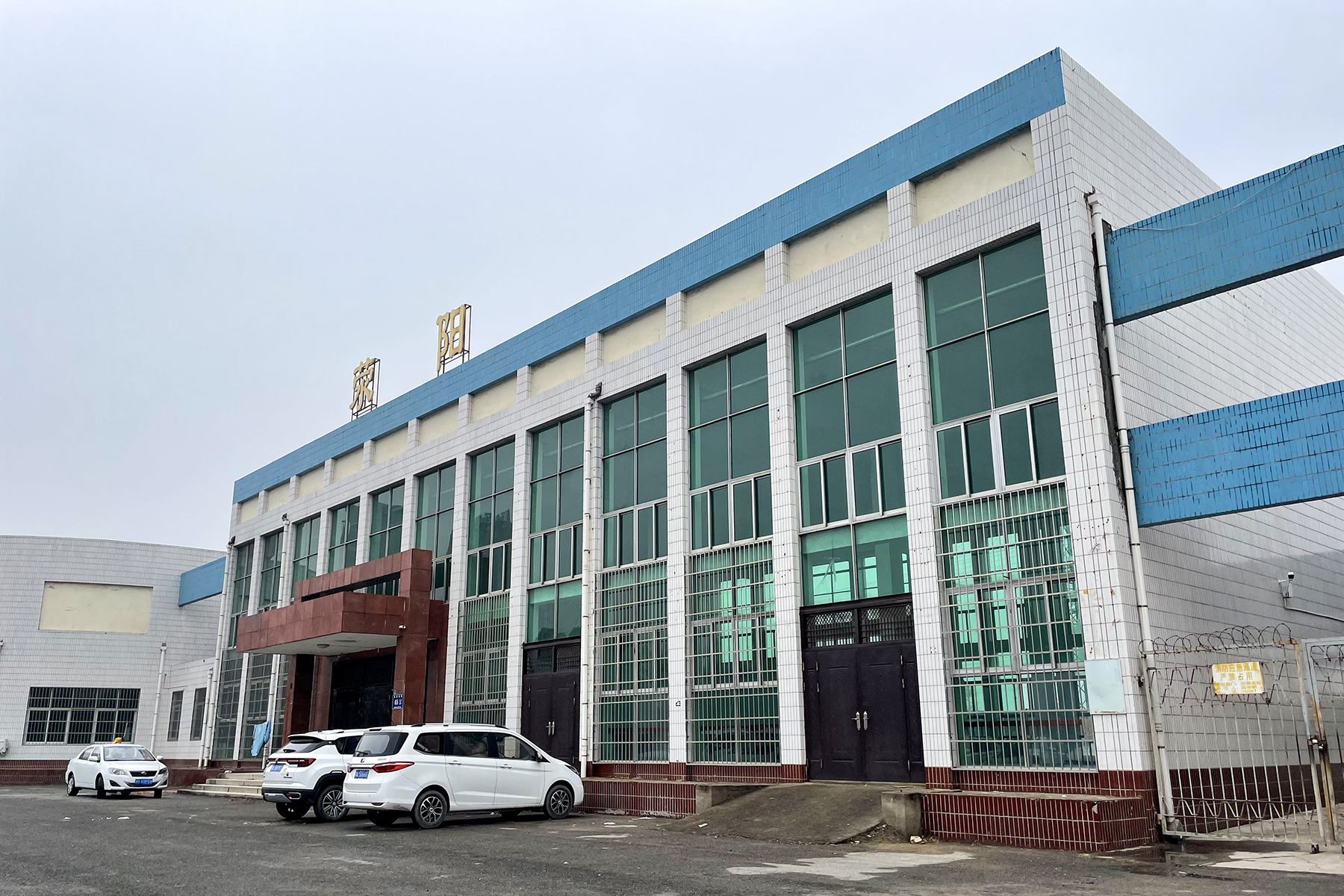

General information
- Location: Xingyang, Zhengzhou, Henan; China
- Coordinates: 34.7999°N 113.3788°E
- Operator: CR Zhengzhou
- Line: Longhai Railway

Other information
- Station code: 39083 (TMIS code)

History
- Opened: 1907
Location
- Location within Zhengzhou Location within Henan Location within China

Xingyang railway station (Chinese: 荥阳站) is a railway station of Longhai railway located in Xingyang, Zhengzhou, Henan, China.

The station is currently out of passenger services.

== History ==
The station was opened in 1907.
