= Yang An (Former Qin) =

4th-century Chouchi prince and former Qin general

- 楊安

Administrator of Wudu (武都太守)
- In office 355 – 356
- Monarch: Yang Guo

General of the Front (前將軍)
- In office 366 – ?
- Monarch: Fu Jian

General Who Guards the South (鎮南將軍)
- In office 370 – ?
- Monarch: Fu Jian

General Who Guards the South (鎮南將軍)
- In office 370 – ?
- Monarch: Fu Jian

Supervisor of the Masters of Writing (吏部尚書)
- In office ?–?
- Monarch: Fu Jian

Inspector of Liangzhou (梁州刺史)
- In office 371 – 373
- Monarch: Fu Jian

Governor of Yizhou (益州牧)
- In office 373 – c. 379
- Monarch: Fu Jian

Inspector of Jingzhou (荊州刺史)
- In office 378 – c. 379
- Monarch: Fu Jian

Personal details
- Born: Unknown Hui County, Gansu
- Died: c. 378
- Parent: Yang Guo (father)
- Peerage: Marquis of Boping (博平侯)

Yang An (died c. 378) was a Di military general of Former Qin and possibly a prince of Chouchi. He was mostly active in Qin's conquest of western China, helping Fu Jian in conquering Chouchi, Yizhou and Liangzhou. Although not as grand as his contemporaries, Deng Qiang and Zhang Ci, the Spring and Autumn Annals of the Sixteen Kingdoms classed him as an important general of Qin whose merits were comparable to the two.

== Early life ==
Yang An's background is one of contradiction and uncertainty. Prior to his first military act serving Former Qin in 366, there was a crisis in Chouchi back in 356 involving a prince also named Yang An. This Yang An was the son of the duke, Yang Guo, who came to power in 355. The Grand Marshal of the Eastern Jin, Huan Wen, petitioned to his court to grant Yang Guo offices while appointing Yang An the Administrator of Wudu. Just a year into his reign, Yang Guo was assassinated by his nephew Yang Jun, who usurped his position.

The Book of Wei states that Yang Jun was immediately killed by Yang An, who ascended the throne before dying in 360. He was succeeded by his son, Yang Shi. However, the Book of Song provides that Yang An fled to the Former Qin after the assassination, while Yang Jun remained on the throne until his death in 360, succeeded by Yang Shi, who in this account, was his own son.

== Service under Fu Jian ==
=== Early career ===
Regardless of his background, Yang An's first appearance under Qin would be in 365, during the rebellions of Liu Weichen and Cao Gu. Yang An led the vanguard together with Mao Sheng (毛盛) while Fu Jian personally campaigned against Cao Gu. Yang An defeated Cao Gu's army and killed his brother, Cao Huo (曹活), forcing Cao Gu to surrender back to Fu Jian while Weichen was captured by Deng Qiang.

In 366, Yang An, Wang Meng and Yao Chang attacked Nanxiang Commandery (南鄉) in Jingzhou, and Jin in response sent Huan Huo to push them back. As Huan Huo reached Xinye, the three generals withdrew, claiming more than ten thousand households north of the Han River.

The following year, the independent warlord in Liangzhou, Li Yan (李儼) was attacked by Former Liang. After asking for help, Fu Jian sent Yang An to reinforce Li at Fuhan (枹罕縣; in present-day Linxia County, Gansu). The situation was resolved after Wang Meng defeated Zhang Tianxi's army near Fuhan and convinced him to withdraw his troops. Thus, no territories were lost between Qin and Liang while Li Yan was moved to Chang'an.

In 368, Yang An participated in quelling the rebellion of Fu Liu (苻柳), Fu Shuang (苻雙), Fu Sou (苻廋) and Fu Wu (苻武). Yang An and Zhang Ci were tasked in facing Fu Sou at Shancheng (陝城, in modern Sanmenxia, Henan) but were ordered by Fu Jian to stack up their supplies and avoid battle first until Fu Shuang and Fu Wu were defeated. Following the defeats of Liu, Shuang, and Wu, Fu Sou was the last of the rebels that Qin had to deal with. Yang An and Zhang Ci received reinforcements in the form of Wang Jian (王鑒) and Deng Qiang sent by Wang Meng. Together, they captured Fu Sou and Shancheng, ending the rebellion as a whole.

=== Conquest of Former Yan ===
War broke out between Former Qin and its rival state, Former Yan in 370. While Wang Meng was heading the campaign, Fu Jian sent Yang An, who was serving as General Who Guards the South at the time, with 60,000 troops to reinforce Wang. Yang An laid siege on Jinyang (晉陽, in modern Taiyuan, Shanxi) but he could not overcome the city's defenses. When Wang Meng arrived to help after capturing Huguan, the two devised a plan to have Zhang Ci infiltrate the city. They dug tunnels under the walls of Jinyang and sent Zhang Ci with a few hundred men into the city to open the gates. After Zhang Ci did so, Wang Meng and Yang An's forces flooded the city and captured its defender Murong Zhuang. After Qin conquered Yan, Yang An was made Marquis of Boping County.

In 371, Fu Jian handed out a number of positions to his officials and officers including Yang An. Yang, who was the Supervisor of the Masters of Writing, was made Commissioner Bearing Credentials, Chief Controller of Yizhou and Liangzhou, and Inspector of Liangzhou.

=== Campaigns in western China ===
In 371, Yang An led a campaign into Chouchi. The Duke of Chouchi, Yang Cuan (楊纂) personally led his army against him with assistance from the Jin dynasty. However, Yang An greatly routed them, killing many of the enemy troops, so Cuan retreated. As Qin forces under Fu Ya (苻雅) approached the capital, Yang Cuan's uncle Yang Tong (楊統) led his followers to surrender. Yang Cuan followed suit and Chouchi was conquered. Yang An relocated the people to Guanzhong, leaving the region around Chouchi emptied as a result. Southern Qinzhou was added into his command and he stationed himself in Chouchi. In 373, the Jin general Yang Guang (楊廣) tried to conquer the region but was repelled by Yang An who then harassed the Han River.

The same year, Fu Jian intended to conquer Yizhou and Liangzhou. Yang An was tasked in taking over Zitong Commandery, defended by its Administrator Zhou Xiao. Zhou Xiao defended hard but made the mistake of sending his wife and mother to Jiangling. They were intercepted by the Qin general Zhu Yong (朱肜), so Zhou Xiao, not wanting to risk their lives, quickly surrendered to Yang An. After the conquest, Yang An was appointed as Governor of Yizhou.

The following year, a rebellion arouse in Shu, headed by Zhang Yu (張育) and Yang Guang (楊光). Zhang Yu's regime was supported by the Jin, who helped him defeat Yao Chang, but although he lasted long enough to declare himself King of Shu, his followers started turning on each other and the rebels were disorderly. Yang An, with the aid of Deng Qiang defeated Zhang Yu who fell back to Mianzhu. Yang An then routed Zhang Yu's subordinates Zhang Zhong (張重) and Yin Wan (楊光) south of Chengdu while Deng Qiang killed Zhang Yu and Yang Guang, putting an end to the revolt.

=== Siege of Xiangyang ===
Yang An would last appear in 378, holding the position of Inspector of Jingzhou. During Fu Jian's great siege of Xiangyang, Yang An and Deng Qiang attacked Fancheng. Yang An seemed to have died during or shortly after the campaign as nothing is recorded of him from this point on. His position of Inspector of Jingzhou was given to Liang Cheng (梁成) in c.March 379 following Xiangyang's fall.
