= Zhang Ci =

4th century Former Qin general

- 張蚝/張蠔

General of the Household Rapid as a Tiger (虎賁中郎將)
- In office 358 – ?
- Monarch: Fu Jian

General Who Spreads Valour (廣武將軍)
- In office 368 – ?
- Monarch: Fu Jian

General of Tiger Fang (虎牙將軍)
- In office 370 – ?
- Monarch: Fu Jian

General of the Front (前將軍)
- In office 371 – ?
- Monarch: Fu Jian

Inspector of Bingzhou (并州刺史)
- In office 379 – 380
- Monarch: Fu Jian

General of Agile Cavalry (驃騎將軍)
- In office 383 – ?
- Monarch: Fu Jian/Fu Pi

Minister of Works (司空)
- In office 385 – ?
- Monarch: Fu Pi

Grand Commandant (太尉)
- In office 386 – 386
- Monarch: Fu Pi

Personal details
- Born: unknown Jincheng, Shanxi
- Died: c. 386
- Parent: Zhang Ping (father)
- Original name: Gong Ci (弓蚝)

Zhang Ci (died c. 386), originally named Gong Ci, was a Chinese military general of Former Qin during the Sixteen Kingdoms period. He was the adopted son of the warlord Zhang Ping and fought during his father's war against Former Qin in 358. After he was captured in battle, Zhang Ci served Qin's ruler Fu Jian, participating in his campaigns against Former Yan, Dai and the Jin dynasty until his presumed death in 386 while serving Fu Pi. He and Deng Qiang were known as the "Enemies of Ten Thousands (萬人敵)", a title previously held by the generals Guan Yu and Zhang Fei during the end of the Han dynasty. His name can be rendered as Zhang Hao.

== Service under Zhang Ping ==
=== Early life and background ===
Zhang Ci was born into a family named Gong (弓) in Xuanshi county (泫氏; in modern-day Jincheng, Shanxi), Shangdang. He was said to be exceptionally strong, being able to move an ox while walking backwards and scaling walls, high or low. His adoptive father, Zhang Ping was the Inspector of Bingzhou during the time of Later Zhao but became an independent warlord following the state's swift decline in 351.

Zhang Ping had adopted Zhang Ci as his son due to his abilities and greatly appreciated him. However, on one occasion, Zhang Ci fell in love with one of Zhang Ping's concubine, and the two started an affair. Zhang Ping soon found out and severely reprimanded him for this. Zhang Ci felt shame and voluntarily castrated himself to become a eunuch in order to prevent himself from doing such a thing ever again.

=== War with Former Qin ===
By 357, Zhang Ping was the strongest warlord in northern China and was seeking to establish his state to compete with Former Qin and Former Yan. On the winter of that year, Ping rebelled against his vassal lord, Qin, and invaded their territory. Fu Jian led a campaign against the warlord and fought him at Fenshang the following year. There, Fu Jian sent out Deng Qiang to lead the vanguard and attack Zhang Ping. In response, Ping ordered Zhang Ci to fight back. Zhang Ci and Deng Qiang battled back and forth for ten days, but neither could take the upper hand.

After Fu Jian reached Tongbi (銅壁, in modern-day Tongchuan, Shaanxi) in March, Zhang Ping led his entire army against him. At Tongbi, Zhang Ci charged into the enemy formation four or five times, all while shouting. Fu Jian had to personally ask for someone to stop Zhang Ci and his charges. It was not until Fu Jian's general Lü Guang, who thrust his spear into Zhang Ci, that he could be stopped. Zhang Ci was brought before Fu Jian by Deng Qiang, and his capture rocked Zhang Ping's side so much that it caused his army to collapse.

The defeat forced Zhang Ping into offering his surrender to Former Qin. Zhang Ci was appointed as Fu Jian's General of the Household Gentlemen Rapid As Tigers. Fu Jian greatly favoured him, and Zhang Ci was often seen by Fu Jian's side. Though Zhang Ping was forgiven and given a post, he would surrender to Former Yan later the same year after being defeated by their forces, leaving Zhang Ci in Qin. Zhang Ping was finally killed by Qin forces in 361.

== Service under Fu Jian and Fu Pi ==
=== Fu Liu, Fu Shuang, Fu Sou and Fu Wu's Rebellion ===
Under Fu Jian, Zhang Ci saw his first noted military activity during the rebellion of Fu Liu (苻柳), Fu Shuang (苻雙), Fu Sou (苻廋) and Fu Wu (苻武) in 368. He and Yang An were tasked in capturing Shancheng (陝城, in modern Sanmenxia, Henan) from Fu Sou but were told by Fu Jian to avoid engaging in battle but rather stock up on supplies until Fu Shuang and Fu Wu were defeated. After Shuang, Wu and also Liu were subdued, Zhang Ci and Yang An were joined by Deng Qiang and Wang Jian (王鑒) to spearhead the assault on the rebel's last stronghold. Fu Sou and Shancheng were captured at the end of the year, thus leaving Fu Jian victorious over the rebellion.

=== Conquest of Former Yan ===
In 370, Zhang Ci participated in Former Qin's conquest of Former Yan as a subordinate of Wang Meng. During the siege of Jincheng, Yang An struggled to capture the city from Murong Zhuang (慕容莊) until he was reinforced from Wang Meng. They dug tunnels under the city walls and had Zhang Ci to lead a hundred brave men to infiltrate the city. Zhang Ci did so, and after giving out a loud cry, they broke open the gate to allow the Qin soldiers to enter and capture Murong Zhuang. Later, when Murong Ping's army met face to face with Wang Meng's at the Battle of Luchuan, Zhang Ci, Deng Qiang and Xu Cheng led their troops head on and routed the numerically superior Yan soldiers. Qin would annex all of Yan that same year.

=== Yuan Qin's rebellion ===
The next year, Fu Jian sent Zhang Ci and Wang Jian (王堅) to reinforce the rebelling Jin general Yuan Qin at Shouchun. Zhang Ci camped at Luojian (洛澗, in modern-day Huainan, Anhui) and sent 5,000 of his cavalry to Shiqiao (石橋), just north of the Fei River (淝水, presumably in Lu'an, Anhui, near the Huai River). The Jin commander, Huan Wen sent Huan Shiqian and Huan Yi to intercept Zhang's cavalry and dealt them a great defeat. Zhang Ci retreated to Shencheng (慎城, in modern-day Fuyang, Anhui) while Yuan Qin's troops scattered at the news of their reinforcements' defeat. Shouchun eventually fell to Jin and Yuan Qin was executed.

=== Conquest of Dai ===
In 376, Fu Jian invaded the Tuoba state of Dai after they attacked the Qin's ally, the Tiefu chieftain Liu Weichen. Zhang Ci was one of the generals involved in the campaign. At the time of the conquest, Dai was troubled by internal strife between its king, Tuoba Shiyiqian and his nephew Tuoba Jin (拓跋斤), who jointly ruled the state with his uncle but was not happy with his restriction of power imposed on him. Tuoba Jin incited Shiyiqian's son, Tuoba Shijun (拓跋寔君), to assassinate his father along with his younger brothers, causing many of their concubines and subordinate to flee to Qin and inform them of the situation in Dai. Hearing this, Zhang Ci and Li Rou (李柔) quickly led their forces and capture Yunzhong. The fall of Yunzhong threw Dai into an even greater state of chaos, and Dai would be conquered shortly after. In c.March 379, Zhang Ci was appointed the Inspector of Bingzhou, replacing Deng Qiang.

=== Battle of Fei River ===
When Fu Jian invaded the Jin dynasty in 383, Zhang Ci assisted Fu Rui (苻叡) in repelling Huan Chong from Xiangyang. Zhang Ci's advance through the Xie Valley intimidated Huan Chong's general Yang Liang (楊亮) into retreating while Chui dealt with Chong himself. Following this, Fu Jian assigned Zhang Ci to Fu Rong, making him his vanguard general. He helped him capture Shouchun and later went south of the Fei River to defeat the Jin general, Xie Shi. However, faced with Xie Xuan's larger forces, Zhang Ci decided to retreat north, setting up the Battle of Fei River. In the battle, the Qin forces were tricked into making a panicked and unorganized retreat, scattering the troops for the Jin soldiers led by Xie Xuan to easily dispatch. Qin lost the battle with heavy casualties, but in their retreat, Zhang Ci managed to repel Xie Shi from pursuing them.

=== Post-Fei River ===
Fu Jian returned to the north defeated. He ordered Zhang Ci to return to Bingzhou with only 5,000 Palace Guards to defend and maintain peace in the province. When Murong Chui, Murong Chong and Yao Chang rebelled against the state in 384, Fu Jian's prince Fu Pi asked for Zhang Ci to march out from Jinyang and reinforce him. However, Zhang could not do anything to help him due to his insufficient number of troops.

After Fu Jian was captured and killed by Yao Chang in 385, Zhang Ci and Wang Teng invited Fu Pi to their base in Jinyang. Fu Pi appointed Zhang Ci as Palace Attendant and Minister of Works. During this time, Zhang Ci was sought by the Dugu chieftain, Liu Toujuan (劉頭眷) to quell the rebelling Xianbei Bai (鮮卑皆) tribes. The two attacked their leader, Jiefu (絜佛) and routed him. In July or August 386, Zhang Ci was appointed as Grand Commandant. Nothing else is recorded about Zhang Ci from this point on.
