= Wangcun, Xingyang =

Wangcun 王村镇
- Town
- Location in Henan
- Coordinates: 34°52′38″N 113°16′17″E
- Country: People's Republic of China
- Province: Henan
- Prefecture-level city: Zhengzhou
- County-level city: Xingyang
- Elevation: 138 m (453 ft)
- Time zone: UTC+8 (China Standard)
- Area code: 0371

Wangcun (Chinese: 王村; pinyin: Wángcūn) is a town in Xingyang, Zhengzhou, northwest-central Henan province, China, located about 14 kilometres (8.7 mi) northwest of downtown Xingyang. As of 2011, it has 24 villages under its administration.

== Economy ==
Located on the flat southern bank of the Yellow River, Wangcun is known for its aquaculture. Since their development started in 1986, the pond systems in Wangcun have grown to the total size of 15,000 mu (10 km^{2}), making the town the largest aquaculture center in North China.

In 2007, construction started in Wangcun on a large turtle farm raising the Yellow River Turtle (a local variety of the Chinese softshell turtle). With the capacity for raising 5 million turtles a year, the facility was expected to become Henan's largest farm of this kind.

== See also ==
- List of township-level divisions of Henan
