= Yulong, Henan =

Yulong Town 豫龙镇
- Town
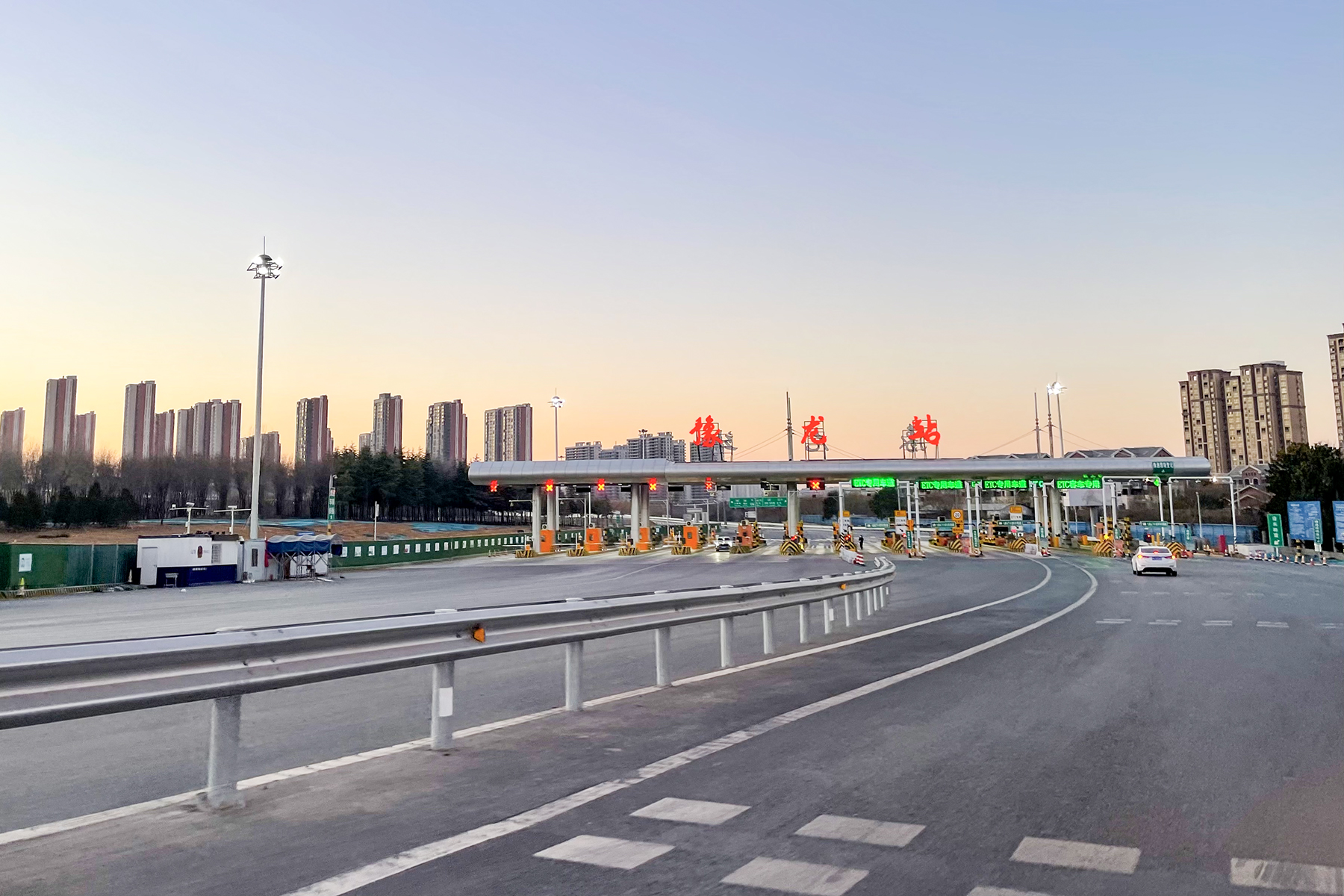
- Yulong Toll Plaza in Zhengzhou

- Location within Henan
- Coordinates: 34°46′6″N 113°25′57″E
- Country: China
- Province: Henan
- Prefecture-level city: Zhengzhou
- County-level city: Xingyang
- Administrative division code: 41 01 82 102

Yulong Town (simplified Chinese: 豫龙镇; traditional Chinese: 豫龍鎮; pinyin: Yùlóng Zhèn) is a town under the administration of Xingyang, Zhengzhou, Henan. In 2015, the Provincial and Local Economic and Social Survey Team named Yulong number 2 of the top 100 towns in Henan.

== Administrative divisions ==
Yulong Town contains three communities and 28 villages:

Communities

- Wanye Community (万业社区), Tanshan Community (檀山社区), Ningshan Community (宁山社区)

Villages

- Ershilipu Village (二十里铺村), Xizhangzhai Village (西张砦村), Zhaizhai Village (翟砦村), Nianxu Village (碾徐村), Fanzhai Village (樊砦村), Shiyuan Village (柿园村), Huaixi Village (槐西村), Chuzhai Village (楚寨村), Wangzhai Village (王寨村), Zhaojiadong Village (赵家垌村), Jingxiangcheng Village (京襄城村), Nanzhangzhai Village (南张寨村), Haozhai Village (郝寨村), Xingguosi Village (兴国寺村), Wawusun Village (瓦屋孙村), Shizhugang Village (石柱岗村), Zhaojiazhuang Village (赵家庄村), Chenzhuang Village (陈庄村), Guandimiao Village (关帝庙村), Jiangzhai Village (蒋寨村), Luodong Village (罗垌村), Ruzhai Village (茹寨村), Maozhai Village (毛寨村), Zhaiyang Village (寨杨村), Yanqu Village (晏曲村), Jiaozhai Village (焦寨村), Liu Village (刘村), and Heizhang Village (黑张村).

== See also ==
- Guandimiao
