= Moyigan =

Chieftain of the Poduoluo tribe (died 407)

Moyigan (沒弈干) (died 407), also known as Moyiyu (沒弈于) or Muyiyu (木易于), was a chieftain of the Xianbei Poduoluo tribe (破多羅; or Poduolan (破多蘭)) during the Sixteen Kingdoms period. He was the father-in-law of Helian Bobo, who took him in after his tribe, the Tiefu was destroyed by the Northern Wei. Despite his act of kindness, Helian Bobo later ambushed and killed Moyigan to take control over his forces, allowing him to establish the Helian Xia dynasty.

== Life ==
Moyigan was a chieftain of the Poduoluo tribe and was described as brave and strong. In 360, Moyigan brought his followers to surrender to the Di-led Former Qin dynasty and settled down at Gaoping (高平; in present-day Guyuan, Ningxia), where he grew to the position of Commandant of Anding Commandery and General of Agile Cavalry.

After the Battle of Fei River and the death of the Qin Heavenly King, Fu Jian, Moyigan initially aligned himself with Fu Jian's cousin, Fu Deng, who proclaimed himself the new emperor in opposition to Yao Chang of the Later Qin. In 386, Moyigan and the Administrator of Pingliang, Jinxi (金熙) attacked the Later Qin general, Yao Fangcheng (姚方成) at Sunqiu Valley (孫丘谷; southeast of present-day Pingliang, Gansu), routing him. In retaliation, Yao Chang marched out to face them at Anding, where he dealt them a great rout.

In 387, the Western Qin prince, Qifu Guoren led a campaign to subjugate three neighbouring Xianbei tribes. Moyigan and Jinxi decided to carry out a surprise attack on Qifu, facing his forces at Kehunchuan (渴渾川; northeast of present-day Yuzhong County, Gansu). However, the two suffered another heavy defeat and retreated.

In 391, Moyigan sent his two sons as hostages to Qifu Gangui (who succeeded Qifu Guoren as Prince in 388) to form an alliance against the Xianbei chieftain, Dadou (大兜). The two attacked Dadou's base at Fort Mingchan (鳴蟬堡; northeast of present-day Qin'an County, Gansu), capturing it along with Dadou and his followers. Qifu then returned Moyigan's sons, but Moyigan then rebelled against him and aligned himself with Liu Weichen of the Tiefu tribe in the east. Qifu led 10,000 cavalry to campaign against him, forcing Moyigan to flee to the city of Talou (他樓; in present-day Guyuan, Ningxia). During the pursuit, Qifu Gangui reportedly shot an arrow into one of Moyigan's eyes. In the end, Qifu had to abort the campaign when he received news that the Later Liang had invaded his western border.

Later that year, the Tiefu tribe was destroyed by an invading force of the Northern Wei. A surviving member of the tribe, Liu Bobo fled to the Xuegan tribe, who then sent him to the Poduoluo. Moyigan not only took Liu Bobo in, but he also married his daughter, Lady Poduoluo (破多罗夫人) to him. In 392, Moyigan surrendered to the Later Qin with 6,000 households. Yao Chang enfeoffed him as the Duke of Gaoping and appointed him as General of Chariots and Cavalry. Later, during the early reign of Yao Chang's successor, Yao Xing, Liu Bobo was introduced to the Later Qin emperor, who was awed by his appearance. Yao Xing appointed Liu as a general and assigned him to assist Moyigan in guarding Gaoping.

In 397, Moyigan, then serving as Inspector of Qin province, cooperated with the Later Liang during their invasion of Western Qin, agreeing to help in attacking Qifu Gangui's eastern flank, but the plan came to nothing as the Liang forces withdrew following a great defeat. That same year, Taixifu of the Xuegan led a tribal alliance to besiege the Later Qin city of Jincheng but failed and fled to Moyigan for protection. Moyigan had him arrested instead and sent him back to the Later Qin.

In 400, during the Later Qin commander, Yao Shuode's expedition to conquer the Western Qin, Yao Xing left his capital with the army to reinforce him. Moyigan secretly plotted to take advantage of Yao Xing's absence to launch an attack on Anding. However, his Chief Clerk, Huangfu Xu (皇甫序), harshly objected to the idea, so he decided not to pursue the matter any further, which he later regretted.

In early 402, the Northern Wei emperor, Tuoba Gui, sent Tuoba Zun and He Ba (和跋) with 50,000 troops to carry out a surprise attack on Moyigan's base at Gaoping. When their forces arrived at Gaoping a few months later, Moyigan abandoned his troops and fled to Qin province with several thousand horsemen and Liu Bobo. The Wei army pursued them to Wating (瓦亭; in present-day Jingyuan County, Ningxia), but were unable to reach him, so they returned to secure his supplies and livestock as well as relocate Moyigan's people to their capital at Pingcheng, dispersing his tribes. In response to their incursions, Yao Xing assembled his forces to attack the Northern Wei later in the year, leaving Moyigan behind to guard Shanggui. However, they suffered a decisive defeat at the Battle of Chaibi.

In 407, Liu Bobo plotted to rebel as he was angered by peace talks between the Later Qin and Northern Wei. After seizing several thousand horses from a Rouran caravan delivering tribute to the Later Qin, he gathered around 30,000 followers and led them to Gaoping under the pretext of a hunting trip. Moyigan was then killed in an ambush laid by Liu Bobo, who proceeded to annex the Poduoluo and absorb his forces.
