= Cao Gu =

Chieftain of the Cao tribe (died 367)

Cao Gu (曹轂) (died 367) was a Hu (Xiongnu) chieftain of the Cao tribe during the Sixteen Kingdoms period.

== Life ==
Nothing is recorded about Cao Gu's background, although his tribe appears to have been descended from the Xiongnu and mainly resided at Ercheng (貳城; northwest of present-day Huangling County, Shaanxi) and its vicinity. They also adopted the Chinese surname, Cao (曹) as their family name. In 360, the chieftain of the Tiefu tribe, Liu Weichen submitted to the Di-led Former Qin dynasty and was given the title Xiongnu Wise Prince of the Left. While it is unclear when and how, Cao Gu became a vassal of the Former Qin as well and was bestowed the corresponding title of Xiongnu Wise Prince of the Right.

In 365, Liu Weichen and Cao Gu rebelled against the Former Qin. Together, they brought with them 20,000 soldiers to attack the city of Xingcheng (杏城; in present-day Yan'an, Shaanxi). The Heavenly King of Qin, Fu Jian, personally set out with an army to quell them. Fu Jian defeated Cao Gu and killed his brother, Cao Huo (曹活), prompting Cao Gu to surrender. Liu Weichen was also defeated by the Qin general, Deng Qiang at Mount Mugen (木根山; north of present-day Yulin, Shaanxi). Despite their rebellion, Fu Jian pardoned them enfeoffed Cao Gu as the Duke of Yanmen before sending him back home to continuing leading his tribe.

In 367, Fu Jian ordered Cao Gu to visit the court of the Former Yan with a caravan of tribute. After completing his visit and returning, Cao Gu soon died of natural causes.

== Descendants ==
Cao Gu had at least two sons; his elder son, Cao Xi (曹璽), and his younger son, Cao Yin (曹寅; also known as Cao Fuyin (曹覆寅)). Fu Jian decided to split Cao Gu's territory into two, with Cao Xi controlling the territory west of Ercheng and Cao Yin controlling the territory east of Ercheng. They were therefore known as the "Eastern and Western Cao" (東西曹), also known as the Erchenghu (貳城胡; "Ercheng Barbarians").

After the Battle of Fei River, Cao Yin and another chieftain from Ercheng, Wang Da (王達) gifted 3,000 horses to the Emperor of the Later Qin, Yao Chang as tribute. Yao Chang appointed Cao Yin as General Who Guards the North and Inspector of Bing province. In 393, Cao Yin was attacked by Taixifu of the Xuegan tribe, who ultimately had to surrender to the Later Qin after the Northern Wei invaded his territory.

In 416, the Hu tribes of Bing province, Dingyang (定陽; present-day Ji County, Shanxi) and Ercheng rebelled against the Later Qin and marched into Pingyang, where they acclaimed a man named Cao Hong (曹弘) as the Grand Chanyu. The rebels were defeated after their failed attack on Fort Xiongnu (匈奴堡; in present-day Linfen, Shanxi), and Cao Hong was captured and sent to Chang'an. According to Hu Sanxing in his commentary of the Zizhi Tongjian, Cao Hong was most likely a descendant of Cao Gu through Cao Yin.
