= Guandimiao =

Archaeological site in Henan, China

- 关帝庙遗址 (Chinese)
- Location within Henan Guandimiao (China)
- 34°47′8.1″N 113°28′12.2″E
- Type: Village
- Periods: Late Shang
- Location: Xingyang, Zhengzhou, Henan, China

History
- Built: c. 1250 BCE
- Abandoned: c. 1100 BCE

Site notes
- Area: 2.5 hectares (6.2 acres)
- Excavation dates: 2006–2008

Guandimiao
- Traditional Chinese: 關帝廟遺址
- Simplified Chinese: 关帝庙遗址
- Hanyu Pinyin: Guāndìmiào yízhǐ
- Literal meaning: "Guandi temple ruins"
Transcriptions
Standard Mandarin
- Hanyu Pinyin: Guāndìmiào yízhǐ
- IPA: [kwán.tî.mjâʊ ǐ.ʈʂɻ̩̀]

Guandimiao (Chinese: 关帝庙遗址; pinyin: Guāndìmiào yízhǐ; lit. 'Guandi temple ruins') is a Chinese archaeological site 18 km (11 miles) south of the Yellow River in Xingyang, Henan. It is the site of a small Late Shang village that was inhabited from roughly 1250 to 1100 BCE. Located 200 km (120 miles) from the site of the Shang dynasty capital at Yinxu in Anyang, the site was first studied as a part of excavations undertaken between 2006 and 2008 in preparation for the nearby South–North Water Transfer Project. Excavation and study at Guandimiao has significantly broadened scholars' understanding of rural Shang economies and rituals, as well as the layout of rural villages, which had received comparatively little attention compared to urban centers like Yinxu and Huanbei.

Calculations derived from the number of graves and pit-houses at Guandimiao suggest a maximum population of around 100 individuals at the site's peak during the early 12th century BCE. The presence of 23 kilns suggests large-scale regional exports of ceramics from the village. Residents used bone tools, including many that were locally produced, as well as sophisticated arrowheads and hairpins likely imported from Anyang, where facilities produced them en masse. Local ritual practice is evidenced by the presence of locally produced oracle bones used in pyromancy and large sacrificial pits where mainly cattle had been buried, alongside a smaller number of pigs and (rarely) humans. Over 200 graves were found at the site. Apart from an almost complete absence of grave goods beyond occasional cowrie shells and sacrificed dogs, they generally resemble shaft tombs found elsewhere in ancient China.

== Background and historiography ==
Before the 20th century, the ancient Shang dynasty (c. 1600 – c. 1046 BCE) of China was known only from much later accounts such as Sima Qian's Shiji, compiled in the 1st century BCE. Modern scholars reanalyzed traditional historiography in the early 20th century. Archaeological interest in the Shang was spurred on by the discovery of the dynasty's oracle-bone inscriptions, which bore the names of kings largely matching family trees in the Shiji. During the 1920s and 1930s, excavations in Anyang, Henan, revealed Yinxu, (Note: Yinxu (殷墟; 'Ruins of Yin') was named for Yin, the name given to the last Shang capital in the traditional Chinese historiography. However, this settlement was referred to as the "Great Settlement Shang" (大邑商; Dàyì Shāng) by the Shang people themselves.) the site of the Shang capital under the Late Shang culture. This period is also known as the Anyang period. However, despite surveys having revealed the existence of many smaller Shang-era sites, archaeological understanding of the Late Shang was limited to the Shang cities, especially in the heartland around Anyang. Contemporary archaeological and historical study of the Shang within China generally focuses on elite settlements and tombs, often through the lens of Marxist historiography.

While the influence of Late Shang material culture across the North China Plain is evident, the precise extent of their political power in the region is unknown. It was weaker than the state of the earlier Erligang culture (c. 1600 – c. 1400 BCE), which has been controversially identified with the early Shang by Chinese archaeologists. The Late Shang state was unable to achieve full political and military dominance over the surrounding regional states, and instead procured tribute and trade goods without governing them directly. Small statelets likely emerged within the Shang's territory.

=== Excavation ===
The Guandimiao site was excavated from 2006 to 2008 as part of preparations for the South–North Water Transfer Project. A large scale excavation of the site unearthed an area of 2.03 ha (5 acres), revealing an unusually detailed ancient village layout. The site was named one of the top ten archaeological discoveries of 2007 by the State Administration of Cultural Heritage, as well as one of the top six discoveries of the year by the Chinese Academy of Social Sciences. Approximately three quarters of the village has been excavated.

Village sites such as Guandimiao have expanded archaeological knowledge of the role of villages within the Shang economy. Villages were previously imagined to be largely self-sufficient, with their role in the broader economy mainly limited to exporting their agricultural surplus for use by the Shang elites. The village's remains show a high amount of specialization in the production of pottery and the rearing of livestock.

== Site ==
Location of Guandimiao and Anyang within the Late Shang core territory and sphere of influence

Guandimiao is around 18 km (11 miles) south of the Yellow River, in what is now Xingyang, Zhengzhou, Henan. It lies about 200 km (120 miles) from Yinxu. During its period of occupation, the site was around 6 km (4 miles) away from the nearest river. It lies within the Xingyang Basin, south of a low mountain, Mount Tan (檀山).

During the Erligang period, two major urban centers were nearby in what is now Zhengzhou and Yanshi. By the Anyang period, the region around Zhengzhou, including Guandimiao, was a network of smaller settlements on the periphery of the Shang's core territory. Although possibly part of the outlying demesne of the Shang kings, the village was likely part of a group of settlements near Zhengzhou under the influence of a local lord. One archaeology theory posits that the site was part of an estate controlled by Shang elites. However, if the Late Shang had a significantly decentralized and commercial economy, the village may have simply provided labor service and tax to the state, but otherwise engaged in its own economic activities.

The site primarily dates to the Anyang period, stretching from the subperiods of Anyang I to III (c. 1250 – c. 1100 BCE). (Note: The Late Shang or Anyang Period is generally split into four subperiods, following the Xia–Shang–Zhou Chronology Project. Anyang I stretches from 1250 to 1220 BCE, Period II from 1220 to 1160, Period III from 1160 to 1102, and Period IV from 1101 to 1046.) This is attested from changes in pottery over time, reflecting those found at Yinxu. Human use during other periods is also attested at the site, including the presence of artifacts from the earlier Yangshao culture (c. 5000 – c. 3000 BCE). During the Anyang I subperiod, mainly the western portion of the village was occupied. The majority of Late Shang remains date to the Anyang II subperiod. A narrow trench was dug around the site, enclosing the village into an area of around 2.5 ha (6 acres). However, during Anyang III, the village began to spread beyond a small encircling ditch.

The village was occupied for roughly 150 years; assuming a generation length of 20 years, this was around seven generations. The 228 Late Shang tombs found at the site suggest a population of over 30 villagers per generation, with a maximum concurrent population estimated around 100 people in the early 12th century BCE (corresponding to the Anyang II subperiod). This is similar to figures estimated from house distribution, which range from 48 to 100 inhabitants at any given time. Limited later human activity at Guandimiao is attested from the Zhou (1046–256 BCE), Han (202 BCE – 220 CE) Tang (618–907), Song (960–1279), and Qing (1644–1912) dynasties.

=== Structures ===
The layout of the Guandimiao village was described by researchers as "basic, if informal". Most houses and around half of the village's kilns are in the northwestern portion of the excavation. Many graves, kilns, and sacrificial pits are scattered across the village. A cluster of kilns sits adjacent to a large cemetery in the northeast of the site, while another cluster of tombs and sacrificial pits are in a possible sacrificial area in the southwest. Well over a thousand pits were dug at the site, mainly for storage and waste disposal, although some were likely used for clay preparation, and at least 17 for sacrifice.

==== Houses ====
Residences at Guandimiao took the form of pit-houses. There were 22 in total, all built around small rectangular or circular pits, ranging from 5–7 m^{2} (50–80 sq ft) in area, each with a central hearth in the form of a sunken fire pit. Their extremely small size restricted them to around five inhabitants, likely restricted to only cooking meals, eating and sleeping within the cramped houses. The southern side of each dwelling had a stairway or ramp structure leading up to ground level. No information on the composition of the roof or superstructural elements was found, although some houses contained rows of postholes. Most of the pit-houses' floors were so damaged as to render it impossible to verify whether they originally contained postholes.

==== Wells ====
As the site was relatively far—around 6 km (4 miles)—from any known rivers, it is likely that the residents, livestock, and pottery industry of Guandimiao relied on water from wells. The 32 wells excavated at the site have been classified into one of two types. One type of well features deep, narrow shafts and is associated with residential usage due to similarities with other wells in North China. The other type of well is much larger and features a wide opening connected to an even wider cistern-like structure below. One well of the latter type was 5 m (16 ft) deep, with an opening measuring 3.27 m × 2.63 m (10.7 ft × 8.6 ft).

=== Artifacts ===
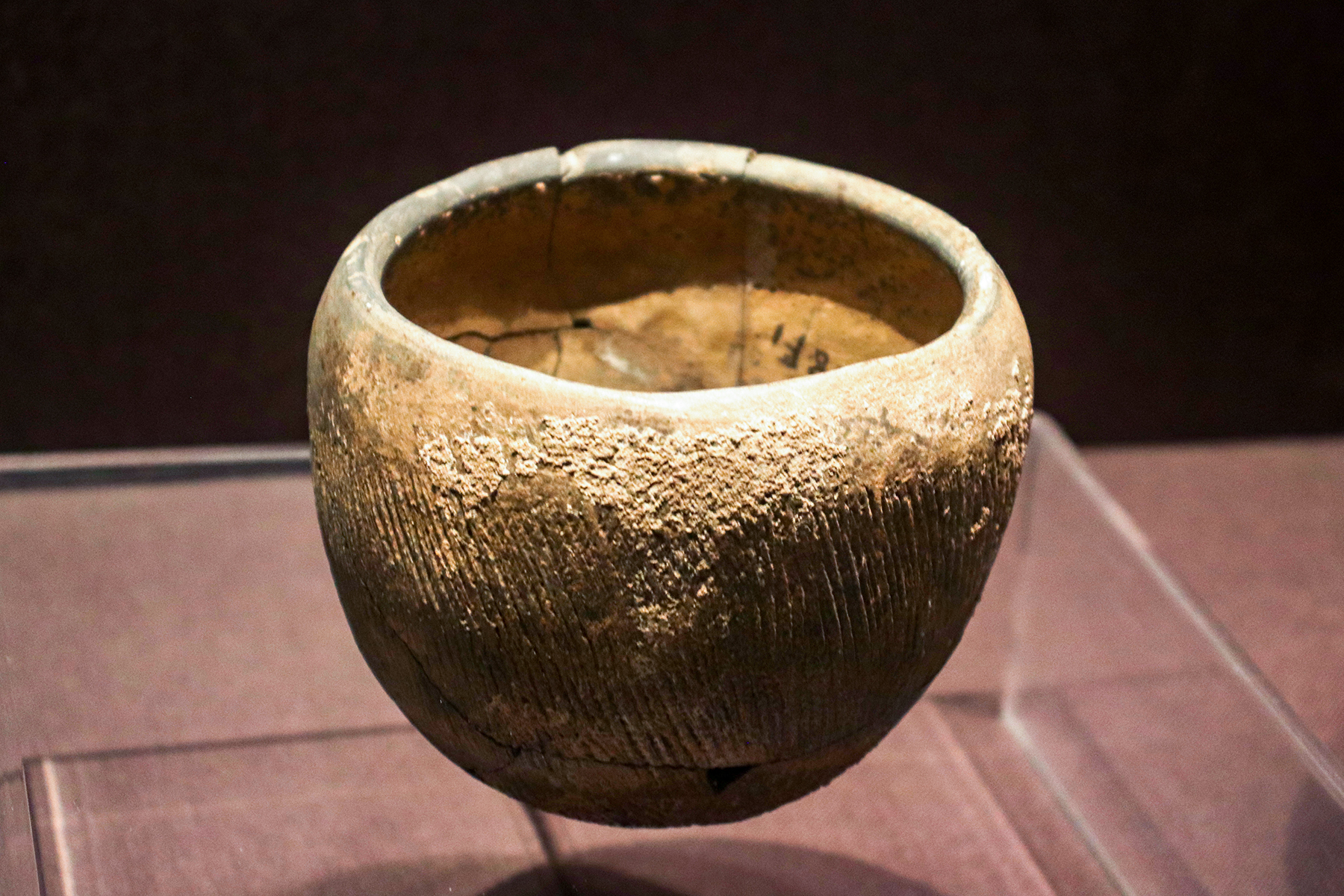
A ceramic bowl from Guandimiao

Various crafts and tools have been found at Guandimiao. Stone implements typical to the Late Shang have been found at the site, including sickles, adzes, chisels, and grinding stones. Some sickles and spades were fashioned from seashells. Various bone tools, including hairpins, arrowheads, awls, spatulas, knives, and spades have also been recovered from the site. Some of the awls are especially crude, showing very little modification, and were likely made hastily by unskilled labor. Many of the other tools bear modifications requiring specialized tools, such as drilling, and may have been made by a more specialized craftsperson. Many uninscribed oracle bones were found at the site, likely requiring large amounts of labor and skill to create; these were likely created by a local pyromancer. Some bone hairpins and arrowheads show a great deal of professional craftsmanship and specialized tooling, and were likely mass produced. These were likely imported from workshops at Anyang, possibly from the excavated bone workshop of Tiesanlu, which had produced practically identical pins and arrowheads.

Scant weaponry has been recovered from Guandimiao. The only likely weapons found at the site are four arrowheads (two bone, two bronze) and a single knife. This is a small amount in comparison to the weaponry recovered from Anyang and especially to the massive weapon caches buried alongside many Late Shang nobles. Cutting implements like sickles were fashioned from large bivalve shells and likely imported from afield. Along with a bell found as a grave good, the knife and two bronze arrowheads are the only bronze artifacts found at the site. The residents of Guandimiao probably lacked bronze tools such as saws, limiting their manufacturing abilities.

=== Kilns and pottery ===
Researchers identified 21 kilns at Guandimiao. Due to the presence of about as many kilns as there are houses, it is possible that each family unit managed their own kiln. Each kiln used a chamber separated from a subterranean firebox by a grate, each featuring between 4 and 8 rectangular vents arranged around a central circular vent. One well-preserved specimen features a chamber with a diameter of 1.56 m (5.1 ft) above an oblong firebox. Large pits that were likely used for clay preparation were dug near each kiln. The distribution of ceramic shards around kiln sites suggests that different clusters of kilns were used to fire sand-tempered and untempered ceramics.

Due to the sheer volume of ceramic production in comparison to what the village would likely require, Guandimiao likely specialized in manufacturing ceramics for export across the surrounding region. This practice possibly began as early as the Longshan period (c. 3000 – c. 1900 BCE). The nature of the rural economy during the Shang is uncertain: The pottery may have been traded locally, integrated into a centralized trade network, or transported long distances by traveling merchants. Due to the differences in the pottery and the significant distance, it is unlikely that pottery was exported to Anyang.

The main forms of pottery produced at the site are urns (weng) and basins (pen), and to a lesser degree li, tripodal cooking vessels. Various other vessels were produced in much smaller numbers for local use. Larger and more elaborate vessels at the site are typically of higher quality than smaller vessels, potentially indicating that they were the specialty of expert potters. Large storage and brewing vessels seem to have occupied much of the site's production time and resources.

=== Burials, sacrifices, and remains ===
The 256 Late Shang-era graves found at the site generally resemble the customs of other Shang shaft tombs. Many are clustered in a cemetery at the northeastern edge of the village, outside the encircling ditch, with the rest scattered across the site, including a cluster around the possible south-western sacrificial area. Most are rectangular pits filled with rammed earth, although a few graves with coffins have been found. Some graves are accompanied by the remains of dog sacrifices. In comparison to shaft tombs at Anyang, an extreme paucity of grave goods has been discovered. Most tombs contained no grave goods whatsoever, but some have a single cowrie shell placed in the mouth or hands of the deceased. The largest tomb at the site contained a human body inside a set of inner and outer coffins, three sacrificial dogs, a bronze arrowhead and bell, and a piece of shell. The general lack of ceramics in the burials (attested in only 3 of the 228) has been considered unusual by archaeologists due to the community's widespread ceramic manufacture.

Archaeologists excavated 17 circular sacrificial pits at Guandimiao, primarily containing the remains of cattle, with smaller numbers of pigs and (rarely) humans. They were mainly filled with soil and covered with ash, although some pits containing oracle bones were filled entirely with ash.

Relatively few animal remains were recovered at the site, around 10% of the number found at the similarly-sized contemporaneous Xiaomintun site in Anyang. Due to this scarcity, the Guandimiao villagers likely ate small quantities of meat in comparison to non-elites within the Shang urban core. The relatively large proportion of cattle remains (associated in the period with sacrifice and elite consumption) among recovered bones suggests they were raised locally and possibly exported for consumption by Shang elites. The remains of older cattle are relatively common at Guandimiao, while (calculated from collected bones) only about 7% of cattle at Xiaomintun died above 4 or 5 years of age. While cattle are often found in sacrificial pits, pig remains are predominant in domestic contexts.

A small amount of sheep and goat remains have been found at the site. Hunting rarely took place at Guandimiao; only about 2% of recovered bones belonged to wild animals. Among this group are several species of wild deer, including sika deer and muntjac. A large volume of dog remains have been found at the site; dogs are also evidenced by gnawing marks on many recovered bones.
