= Taixifu =

Chieftain of the Xuegan/Chigan tribe

Taixifu (太悉伏) was a chieftain of the Xianbei Xuegan (薛干; or Chigan (叱干)) tribe during the Sixteen Kingdoms period. His name appears differently throughout the various records of the period; among his many names, he is also known as Chigan Tadoufu (叱干他鬥伏), Xue Datou (薛達頭), Xue Bo (薛勃) and Taixifo (太悉佛).

== Life ==
Taixifu's tribe was known as the Xuegan or Chigan, who appear to have resided around the area of Sancheng (三城; southwest of present-day Yan'an, Shaanxi). In 391, the Tiefu tribe of Shuofang was destroyed by the Northern Wei, so Taixifu led his soldiers to submit to the Wei emperor, Tuoba Gui. Taixifu was praised by Tuoba Gui, who enfeoffed him as Marquis of Liaocheng, appointed him Household Gentleman of the Executive Captain and gave him a wife from the Zheng clan (鄭氏).

However, after the Northern Wei left, Liu Bobo, a surviving member of the Tiefu, sought refuge with the Xuegan. Tuoba Gui sent an envoy to Taixifu demanding that he hand over Liu Bobo. Taixifu considered doing so, but his nephew, Chigan Ali argued that they must show sympathy to Liu, who had just lost his entire tribe. The records are unclear on Taixifu's final decision; one account states that he ultimately refused to surrender Liu Bobo and sent him to stay with Moyigan of the Poduoluo tribe. Another account states that Taixifu, fearing retaliation from the Wei, agreed to hand Liu Bobo over, but Chigan Ali secretly sent out agents to intercept Liu's group and send him to Moyigan.

Regardless of which account was true, relation soured between the Xuegan and Northern Wei over Liu Bobo's escape. In 393, Taixifu led an attack on the chieftain of the Eastern Cao tribe and Later Qin vassal, Cao Yin at Ercheng (貳城; northwest of present-day Huangling County, Shaanxi). In his absence, Tuoba Gui launched a surprise attack on Sancheng, massacring the city. Taixifu's son, Zhenbao (珍寶), was captured, and the remaining inhabitants were forcibly relocated to Wei territory. When Taixifu heard what had happened, he requested the Later Qin for reinforcements before turning back to pursue Tuoba Gui. However, as Tuoba Gui was out of his reach, he decided to surrender to Qin instead.

In 394, as the Northern Wei withdrew from his territory, Taixifu rebelled against the Later Qin. The Emperor of Qin, Yao Xing sent his general, Yao Chong (姚崇), who defeated and captured Taixifu along with many of his soldiers and horses. Taixifu was brought back to the Qin capital, Chang'an to live in exile, but in 395, he escaped and fled north of the mountain ranges, where he received support from the various Hu tribes of Ercheng and Shang Commandery.

In 397, Taixifu and his followers laid siege to the Qin general, Yao Xiang (姚詳) at Jincheng, so Yao Xing dispatched Yao Chong and Yin Wei campaign against him. Taixifu personally came from Sanjiao (三交; west of present-day Jingbian County, Shaanxi) to attack Jincheng. The Qin army suffered from logistical issues, but when Yao Xing arrived with 20,000 soldiers to reinforce them, Taixifu panicked. His forces were soon defeated, and Taixifu fled to join Moyigan, but Moyigan arrested him and handed him over to Yao Xing.

After the defeat at Jincheng, Taixifu ceased to appear in records, but his tribe remained prominent in the northern border. In 408, Liu Bobo, who soon changed his name to Helian Bobo, rebelled against the Later Qin and founded the Helian Xia dynasty. Not long after, he defeated and annexed the Xuegan tribe. Helian Bobo notably appointed Chigan Ali as one of his chief officials, and assigned him to oversee the construction of his new capital, Tongwancheng. After the fall of Tongwancheng in 427, the Xuegan became registered households under the Northern Wei and changed their family name to Xue (薛). The Wei court also gave Taixifu the posthumous name of "Dao" (悼).
