= Liu Weichen =

Chieftain of the Tiefu tribe (died 391)

Liu Weichen (劉衞辰) (died 392) was a chieftain of the Tiefu tribe during the Sixteen Kingdoms period. During the early years of his chieftaincy, Liu Weichen waivered his allegiance between the Di-led Former Qin dynasty and the Tuoba-Xianbei kingdom of Dai. In 376, he guided the Qin in their conquest of Dai, but after the campaign, he rebelled and was defeated by his cousin tribe, the Dugu. He returned to prominence in the Hetao region during the collapse of the Former Qin after the Battle of Fei River, but in 392, he and his tribe were destroyed by the Northern Wei. He was survived by his son, Liu Bobo (later known as Helian Bobo), who later founded the Helian Xia dynasty and posthumously named him as Emperor Huan of (Helian) Xia (桓皇帝).

== Life ==
=== Background ===
Liu Weichen was the third son of Liu Wuhuan, a chieftain of the Tiefu tribe in the Hetao region, who were descendants of the Southern Xiongnu Wise Prince of the Left, Qubei. His elder brother, Liu Xiwuqi, led their tribe from 358 to 359, and following his death, Liu Weichen killed Xiwuqi's son and succeeded him to the chieftaincy. In 360, Liu Weichen sent his son with tribute to the Dai court in the east, whose ruling prince, Tuoba Shiyiqian reciprocated by marrying the son to one of his daughters.

=== Submissions to Dai and Former Qin ===
Later that year, Liu Weichen secretly sent envoys to the Former Qin dynasty in the Guanzhong region to offer his submission and ask permission for his people to use their farmlands, promising to tend to them during the spring and leave in the autumn. The Qin Heavenly King, Fu Jian, agreed to his terms and appointed him as the Xiongnu Wise Prince of the Left. That summer, Fu Jian's general, the Protector of Yunzhong, Jia Yong (賈雍) issued unauthorized raids on Liu Weichen's followers while they were farming, taking many of them captive. Fu Jian angrily reprimanded and demoted him before freeing and comforting the captives.

A few months later, a concubine of Tuoba Shiyiqian, Lady Murong (慕容氏), died, and Liu Weichen left Qin to attend her funeral. During the funeral, Weichen asked Shiyiqian for a wife, so Shiyiqian gave another daughter for Weichen to marry. In 361, he led a raid on Former Qin's border and captured more than 50 people as slaves. He delivered them to the Qin court as tribute, but Fu Jian rebuked him and had the slaves released. As a result, Weichen broke off relation with Qin and aligned himself with Dai.

However, in 365, Liu Weichen betrayed the Dai, and this time, Tuoba Shiyiqian marched east of the Yellow River and drove Liu Weichen out of his territory. Weichen surrendered back to the Qin, but just a few months later, he rebelled against them with the Xiongnnu Wise Prince of the Right, Cao Gu. The two men led 20,000 followers to attack Xingcheng (杏城; in present-day Yan'an, Shaanxi), but Fu Jian routed Cao Gu, and Liu Weichen was soon defeated and captured by the Qin general, Deng Qiang at Mount Mugen (木根山; north of present-day Yulin, Shaanxi). Despite his betrayal, Fu Jian pardoned Liu Weichen, enfeoffing him as the Duke of Xiayang and sending him back home to lead his tribe.

Liu Weichen continued to send tributes to Dai, but by now was more inclined towards Qin. In winter 367, Tuoba Shiyiqian led an attack on Liu Weichen, during which he allegedly used reed ropes to restrict the flow of the Yellow River and form an ice bridge for his soldiers to cross. Liu Weichen was surprised by the early arrival of the Dai army and fled west with his family. Shiyiqian captured many of the Tiefu soldiers before returning home. When Liu Weichen went to the Former Qin, Fu Jian sent him back to guard Shuofang with additional troops.

=== Conquest of Dai ===
In 374, Liu Weichen was once again defeated by the Dai and fled south. With his domain under threat, he sought aid from the Qin to settle the issue once and for all. In 376, Fu Jian, while also seeking to unify northern China, launched a campaign to subjugate the Dai, with Liu Weichen acting as a guide. By the end of the year, Tuoba Shiyiqian was killed by his own son, and the Qin swiftly annexed his entire territory. At the advice of Yan Feng (燕鳳), Fu Jian divided the former Dai lands into two, with Liu Weichen controlling the part west of the Yellow River, while the eastern part was given to Liu Kuren, who was from a cousin tribe of the Tiefu known as the Dugu.

However, Liu Weichen was angry that he received a lower status than Liu Kuren, so he killed the Former Qin Administrator of Wuyuan and rebelled. Liu Kuren attacked and defeated Liu Weichen, pursuing him to a place northwest of the Yin mountains where he captured his wife and children. After some time, Liu Weichen reconciled with Fu Jian, who appointed him Western Chanyu and garrisoned him at Dailai city (代来城; also known as Yueba (悅跋); either in present-day Ordos City, Inner Mongolia or Yulin, Shaanxi) to oversee the western tribes such as the Rouran.

=== Post-Battle of Fei River ===
In 383, the Former Qin suffered a devastating defeat at the Battle of Fei River and rapidly disintegrated. In 386, the Tuoba clan, led by Tuoba Gui, restored their state as the Northern Wei, but was immediately thrown into a civil war by Tuoba Kuduo and the Dugu tribe. Thirteen chieftains of the Tuoba, including Shisun Puluo (叔孫普洛), brought the various Wuhuan tribes to flee west to Liu Weichen. When Tuoba Kuduo was defeated later that year, he also fled to Liu Weichen, but Weichen had him executed.

Around this period, Liu Weichen reasserted his control over Shuofang, where he reportedly had 38,000 horse archers under his command. Due to his formidable force, the emperor of Later Qin, Yao Chang, appointed him grand general, grand chanyu and the governor of You province and gave him the title of Prince of Hexi. The emperor of Western Yan, Murong Yong, also appointed him as grand general and Governor of Shuo province. In 387, Liu Weichen sent 3,000 horses to the emperor of Later Yan, Murong Chui to establish good relations, although these were intercepted by the Dugu chieftain, Liu Xian.

=== War with Northern Wei and death ===
In 390, Liu Weichen sent his son, Liu Zhilidi (劉直力鞮) to attack the Helan tribe. The Helan chieftain, He Ne (賀訥), was perturbed and asked to surrender to the Northern Wei. Soon, Tuoba Gui personally came to rescue him and defeated Liu Zhilidi. The following year, Moyigan of the Poduoluo tribe rebelled against the Western Qin dynasty and alllied with the Tiefu.

Later in 391, Liu Weichen sent Liu Zhilidi to attack the Northern Wei's southern border. According to the Book of Wei, Liu Zhilidi had around 80,000 or 90,000 soldiers, while Tuoba Gui only brought with him 5,000 or 6,000 troops to oppose him. Despite the numerical disadvantage, Tuoba Gui dealt Liu Zhilidi a heavy defeat south of Mount Tieqi (鐵岐山; north of the Yin Mountains in Inner Mongolia), causing Liu Zhilidi to flee alone. In early 392, Tuoba Gui rode the momentum to invade the Tiefu capital at Dailai. Liu Weichen fled with his sons, but Liu Zhilidi was captured at Mount Mugen. Liu Weichen was later killed by his own subordinates, and more than 5,000 of his clansmen and followers were executed and thrown into the Yellow River by Tuoba Gui.

One of Liu Weichen's son, Liu Bobo managed to escape to Taixifu, chieftain of the Xuegan clan, who later delivered him to Moyigan. Liu Bobo became a Later Qin general and guarded their northern border at Shuofang. In 407, he rebelled and established the Xia dynasty, changing his surname to Helian in the process. After Helian Bobo elevated himself to Emperor in 418, Liu Weichen was posthumously name by his son as Emperor Huan and given the temple name of Taizu (太祖).

== Bibliography ==
- Lü, Simian (1948), A History of Jin, Northern and Southern Dynasties 两晋南北朝史, vol. 1, Shanghai: Kaiming Press
