= Xingyang =

Xingyang 荥阳市
- County-level city
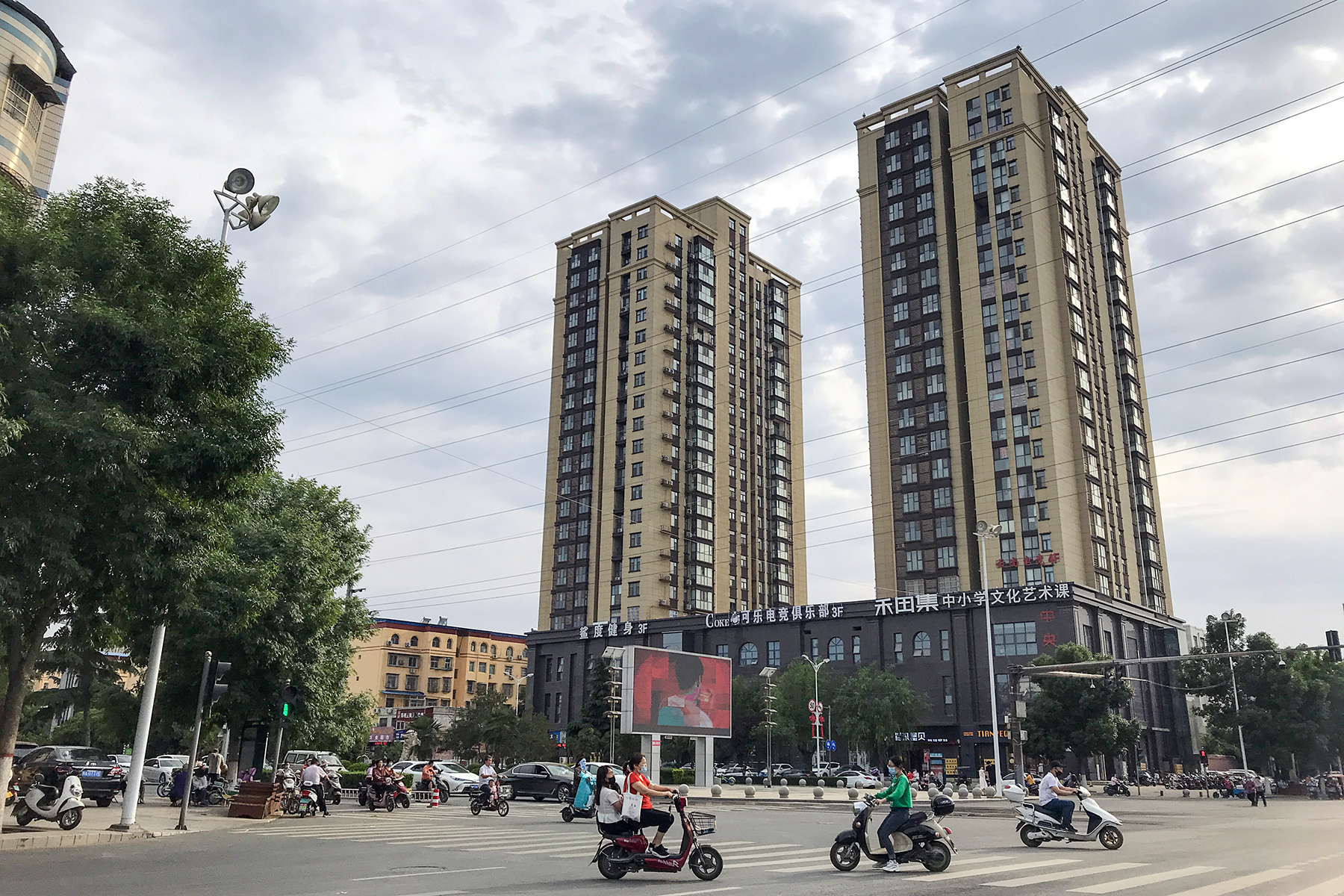
- Xingyang in May 2020

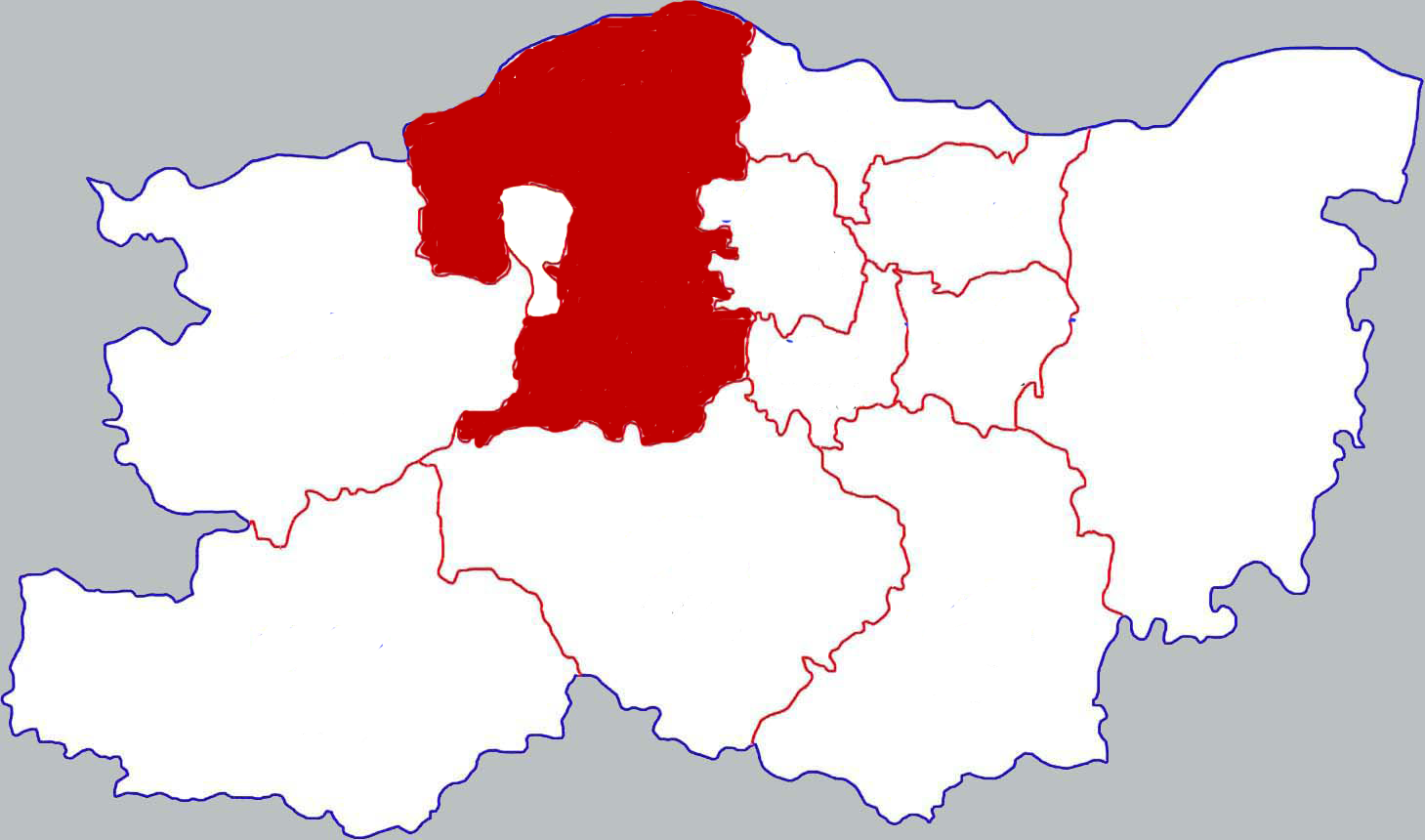
- Location in Zhengzhou

- Location in Henan
- Coordinates: 34°47′15″N 113°23′02″E
- Country: People's Republic of China
- Province: Henan
- Prefecture-level city: Zhengzhou

Area
  - Total: 955 km^{2} (369 sq mi)

Population (2019)
  - Total: 648,700
  - Density: 679/km^{2} (1,760/sq mi)
- Time zone: UTC+8 (China Standard)
- Postal code: 450100
- Website: www.xingyang.gov.cn

Xingyang
- Simplified Chinese: 荥阳
- Traditional Chinese: 滎陽
Transcriptions
Standard Mandarin
- Hanyu Pinyin: Xíngyáng
- Wade–Giles: Hsing^{2}-yang^{2}
- IPA: [ɕǐŋ.jǎŋ]

Xingyang (simplified Chinese: 荥阳; traditional Chinese: 滎陽; pinyin: Xíngyáng) is a county-level city in Zhengzhou, Henan Province, South Central China. It is situated 15 kilometers to the west of Zhengzhou city proper. The population of Xingyang is around 590,000 and the area of Xingyang is about 908 km^{2} (351 sq mi).

== Administration ==
The county-level city of Xingyang administers 16 township-level divisions, including 2 sub-districts, 9 towns, 2 townships, 1 ethnic township and 1 landscape division.

Subdistricts

1. Suohe Subdistrict (索河街道)
2. Jingcheng Subdistrict (京城街道)

Towns

1. Qiaolou Town (乔楼镇)
2. Yulong Town (豫龙镇)
3. Guanwu Town (广武镇)
4. Wangcun Town (王村镇)
5. Sishui Town (汜水镇)
6. Gaoshan Town (高山镇)
7. Liuhe Town (刘河镇)
8. Cuimiao Town (崔庙镇)
9. Jiayu Town (贾峪镇)

Townships

1. Chengguan Township (城关乡)
2. Gaocun Township (高村乡)
3. Beimang Township (北邙乡)

Ethnic townships

1. Jinzhai Hui Ethnic Township (金砦回族乡)

== Climate ==
Climate data for Xingyang, elevation 141 m (463 ft), (1991–2020 normals, extremes 1981–2010)
| Month | Jan | Feb | Mar | Apr | May | Jun | Jul | Aug | Sep | Oct | Nov | Dec | Year |
|---|---|---|---|---|---|---|---|---|---|---|---|---|---|
| Record high °C (°F) | 18.1 (64.6) | 23.9 (75.0) | 31.3 (88.3) | 38.9 (102.0) | 40.1 (104.2) | 42.5 (108.5) | 41.4 (106.5) | 39.0 (102.2) | 38.7 (101.7) | 33.8 (92.8) | 28.0 (82.4) | 22.1 (71.8) | 42.5 (108.5) |
| Mean daily maximum °C (°F) | 5.9 (42.6) | 9.9 (49.8) | 15.8 (60.4) | 22.6 (72.7) | 28.1 (82.6) | 32.4 (90.3) | 32.5 (90.5) | 30.8 (87.4) | 27.1 (80.8) | 21.8 (71.2) | 14.4 (57.9) | 8.0 (46.4) | 20.8 (69.4) |
| Daily mean °C (°F) | 1.0 (33.8) | 4.4 (39.9) | 10.1 (50.2) | 16.6 (61.9) | 22.3 (72.1) | 26.8 (80.2) | 27.8 (82.0) | 26.2 (79.2) | 21.9 (71.4) | 16.3 (61.3) | 9.2 (48.6) | 3.2 (37.8) | 15.5 (59.9) |
| Mean daily minimum °C (°F) | −2.7 (27.1) | 0.1 (32.2) | 5.2 (41.4) | 11.1 (52.0) | 16.8 (62.2) | 21.4 (70.5) | 23.8 (74.8) | 22.5 (72.5) | 17.6 (63.7) | 11.8 (53.2) | 5.0 (41.0) | −0.6 (30.9) | 11.0 (51.8) |
| Record low °C (°F) | −16.9 (1.6) | −16.5 (2.3) | −6.4 (20.5) | −1.4 (29.5) | 5.4 (41.7) | 12.5 (54.5) | 16.4 (61.5) | 12.5 (54.5) | 6.7 (44.1) | −1.1 (30.0) | −8.9 (16.0) | −10.0 (14.0) | −16.9 (1.6) |
| Average precipitation mm (inches) | 10.9 (0.43) | 12.9 (0.51) | 19.2 (0.76) | 34.4 (1.35) | 59.9 (2.36) | 61.0 (2.40) | 127.6 (5.02) | 117.3 (4.62) | 76.8 (3.02) | 37.6 (1.48) | 26.2 (1.03) | 7.8 (0.31) | 591.6 (23.29) |
| Average precipitation days (≥ 0.1 mm) | 4.0 | 4.1 | 4.9 | 5.7 | 6.9 | 7.9 | 10.5 | 10.5 | 8.8 | 6.1 | 5.3 | 3.3 | 78 |
| Average snowy days | 4.1 | 3.1 | 1.3 | 0.2 | 0 | 0 | 0 | 0 | 0 | 0 | 1.0 | 2.3 | 12 |
| Average relative humidity (%) | 56 | 56 | 54 | 57 | 57 | 57 | 72 | 76 | 70 | 63 | 61 | 56 | 61 |
| Mean monthly sunshine hours | 104.8 | 118.5 | 164.1 | 192.9 | 212.7 | 192.7 | 164.2 | 163.0 | 146.6 | 141.8 | 126.3 | 119.4 | 1,847 |
| Percentage possible sunshine | 33 | 38 | 44 | 49 | 49 | 45 | 38 | 39 | 40 | 41 | 41 | 39 | 41 |
Source: China Meteorological Administration

== History ==
The name of Xingyang, coming from Shangshu, means the city located in the north of Xing River (荥). The history of Xingyang can be retrieved in books written more than 3,000 years ago.

It is believed in Chinese legend that Xingyang is the place where Chang'e flew to the Moon. In addition, many influential persons in Chinese history were from Xingyang, such as Shen Buhai, a legalist in the Warring States period) and Li Shangyin (a poet in late Tang dynasty). Moreover, Xingyang is considered as the origin place of the people whose surname is Zheng (郑氏) in the world.

Xingyang is home to remains from the Han dynasty.

Buddhist antiquities have been found there.

== Economy ==
In 2004 the GDP is ¥ 14.5 Billion, and the GDP per capita is ¥ 23,387.

Located on the flat southern bank of the Yellow River, Xingyang's Wangcun Town is known for its aquaculture. Since their development started in 1986, the pond systems in Wangcun have grown to the total size of 15,000 mu (10 km^{2}), making the town the largest aquaculture center in North China.

In 2007, construction started in Wangcun on a large turtle farm raising the Yellow River Turtle (a local variety of the Chinese softshell turtle). With the capacity for raising 5 million turtles a year, the facility was expected to become Henan's largest farm of this kind.

== Transportation ==
=== Taxi ===
In 2005, the start fee of Taxi for the first 3 kilometres is about ¥ 4, and the cost for every additional kilometre is ¥ 1. Fares are generally somewhat higher during 10 pm to 6 am. Normally ¥ 6–7 is maximum for traveling in Xingyang.

=== High-speed rail ===
Zhengzhou West Railway Station is located in Xingyang.

=== Zhengzhou Metro ===
Xingyang is a county-level city under Zhengzhou's administration. Several Zhengzhou Metro stations in Xingyang:

- Line 6: Jiayu, Donglinhu, Donglinsi
- Line 10: Zhengzhouxi railway station, Lishangyin Gongyuan

== Tourist attractions ==
- Chuhehanjie (楚河汉界, or Honggou) is a famous place in the early Western Han dynasty where Liu Bang, the creator of the Western Han dynasty, fought for years with his rival, Xiang Yu. Because none of them could win after years, they decided to use the Chuhehanjie to divide China into two parts, with the eastern part to Xiang Yu and western part to Liu Bang after negotiation. Liu Bang broke this agreement later when Xiang Yu retreated from Xingyang to rescue the capital of his territory, which was attacked by Han Xin. The border between the two is commonly referenced in Xiangqi (i.e., Chinese chess) as the symbolic divider between the two sides of a game board.
- Hulao Pass is an important site in the Three Kingdoms period where Lü Bu fought with Liu Bei, Guan Yu, and Zhang Fei.
- The Ruins of Yangshao civilization (仰韶文化遗址)
- Huancuiyu Landscape area

== Agricultural products ==
- Xingyang dried persimmon
- Guangwu Megranate

== Notable residents ==
The hometown of the character Zheng (T: 鄭, S: 郑) from The Tale of Li Wa is Xingyang.
