= Military history of the Jin dynasty and the Sixteen Kingdoms =

Period in Chinese military history

Western Jin dynasty in 280 AD

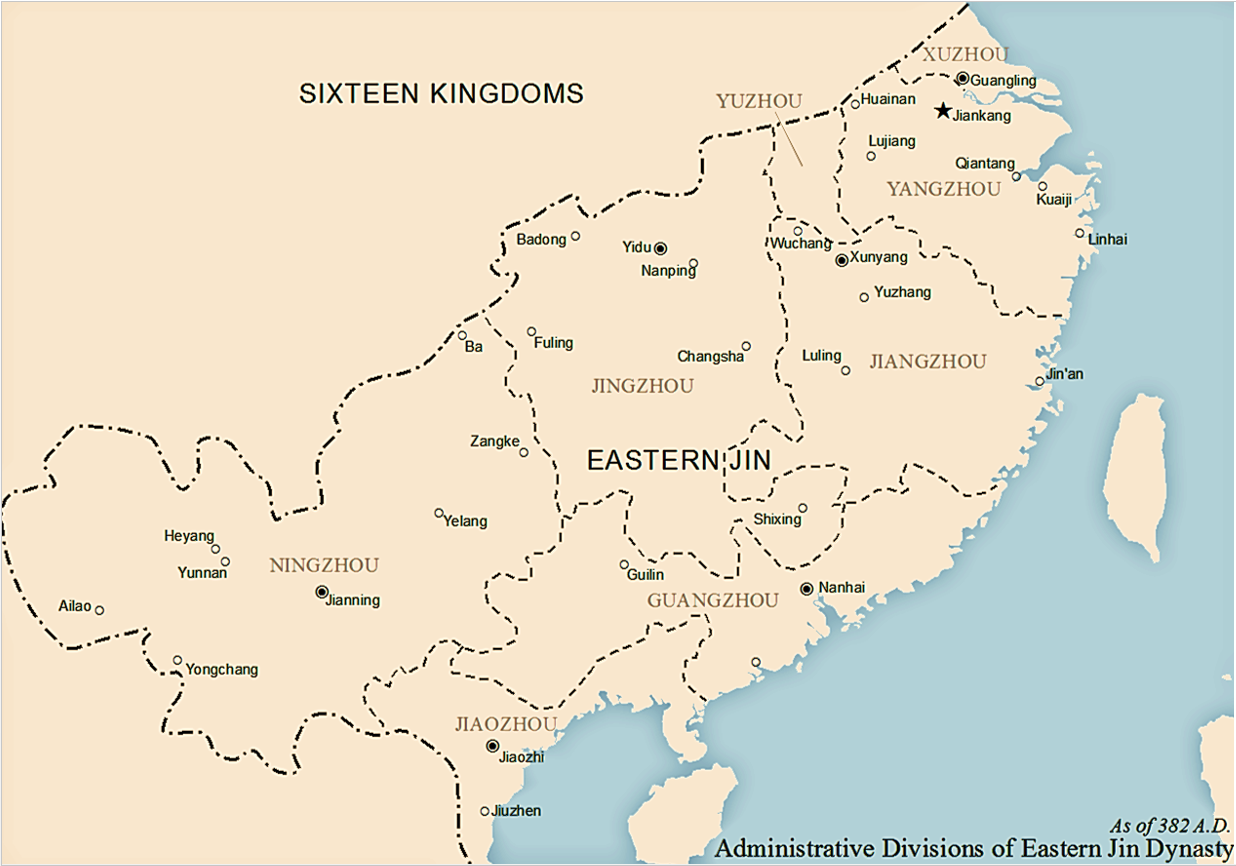
Eastern Jin in 382 AD

The military history of the Jin dynasty and the Sixteen Kingdoms encompasses the period of Chinese military activities from 266 AD to 420 AD. The Jin dynasty is usually divided into the Western Jin and Eastern Jin in Chinese historiography. Western Jin lasted from its usurpation of Cao Wei in 266 to 316 when the Uprising of the Five Barbarians split the empire and created a number of barbarian states in the north. The Jin court relocated to Jiankang, starting the era of Eastern Jin, which ended in 420 when it was usurped by Liu Yu, who founded the Liu Song dynasty.

The Sixteen Kingdoms were a series of barbarian states occupying northern China after the fall of Western Jin. They were eventually extinguished by Northern Wei in 439 AD.

== Organization ==
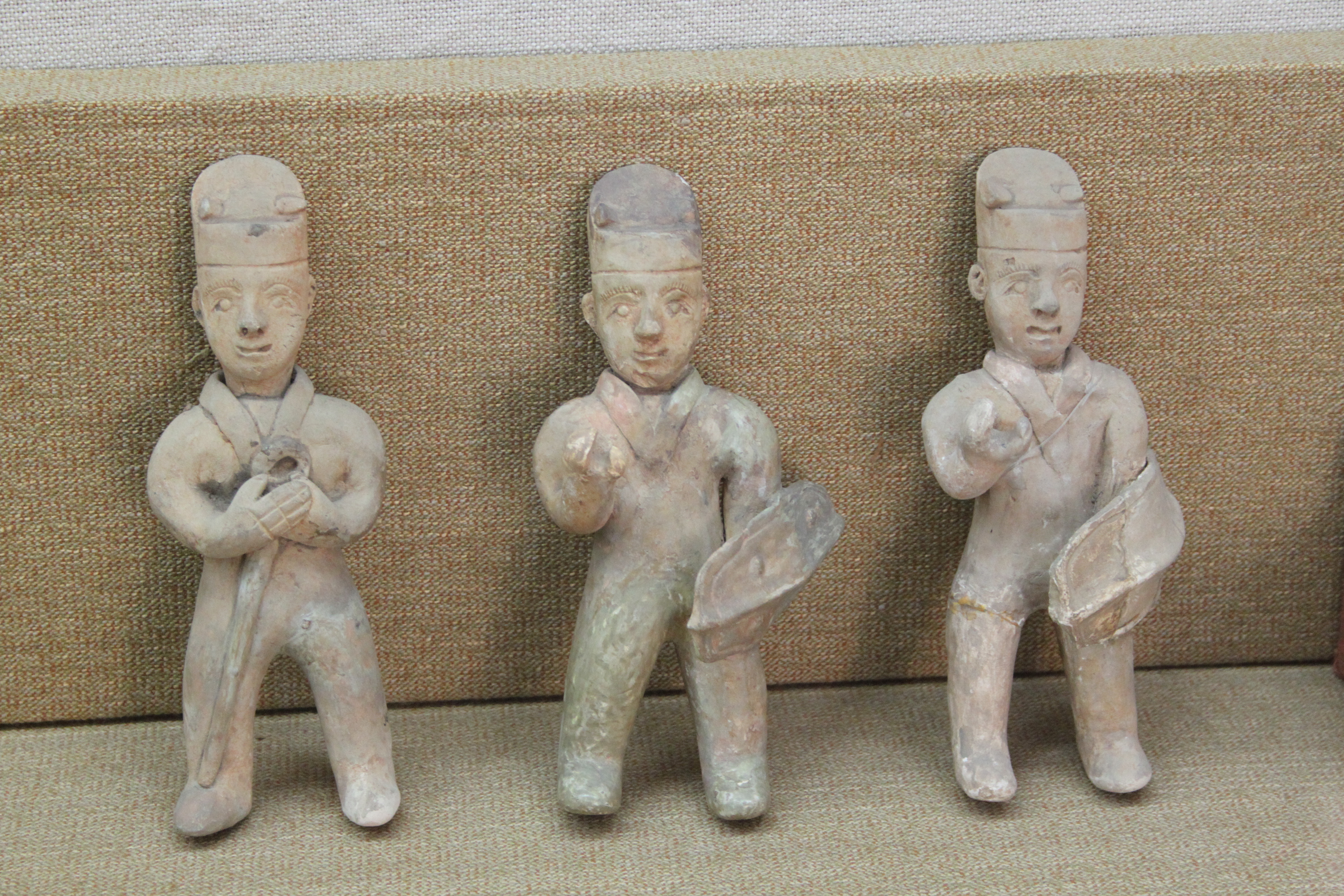
Jin soldiers holding shields.

The Jin dynasty's military structure was largely inherited from Cao Wei. During the Three Kingdoms period, military leadership was functionally hereditary as long as the successor was loyal to his liege and proved competent. When the commander died, a male member of his family inherited control of his troops, and when a soldier died one of his male relatives inherited his position in the unit. By the end of the Three Kingdoms, the term buqu (部曲) had come to designate the institution of hereditary military leadership. Both bu and qu, meaning battalions and companies, were originally units of military organization during the Han. Under Cao Cao, a more systematic form of hereditary soldiery was implemented through "military families" (士家 shijia) which later became "hereditary troops" (世兵 shibing). As their name implies, able male members born into military families served for life, and when they could no longer serve because of illness or death, their sons or close family members replaced them. Their families lived at the capital and other major centers where they could be used by the government as hostages to ensure the loyalty of their soldiers. They were also forbidden from marrying into non-military families in order to prevent their offspring from exiting the system, thus creating a closed community of military households. Although commoners could still be called up in times of urgent need, the rise of government mandated military communities under Cao Wei and the demobilization of local levies under the Jin dynasty, had by and large, replaced the universal conscription of the Han.

The situation changed after the fall of Western Jin. Having lost the resources of the north, the Eastern Jin army attempted to bolster the number of military families in the south by incorporating convicts, vagrants, and aboriginals. This resulted in a general decline of social status and morale in the military. By the end of the dynasty, military men were regarded little better than government slaves. Terms of service were exceedingly harsh. One in three men from a military family was called upon for a term of service lasting from the age of 15 to their 60s. Essentially their entire life. Those who suffered debilitating injuries had to find a replacement from their family to procure release. Desertion was rampant and exit from the military household system a much sought after reward. By the sixth century the system of hereditary military households had collapsed.

During the following Liu Song dynasty, voluntary recruits began to supplant the defunct military caste system. Many of these soldiers were former members of the previous system who had been freed, and had chosen to re-enlist for better terms, or because they could find no better employment. In practice, many of the military communities which had sprung up during the era of hereditary troops stayed together, and provided the basis for recruitment for the next dynasty.

== Equipment ==
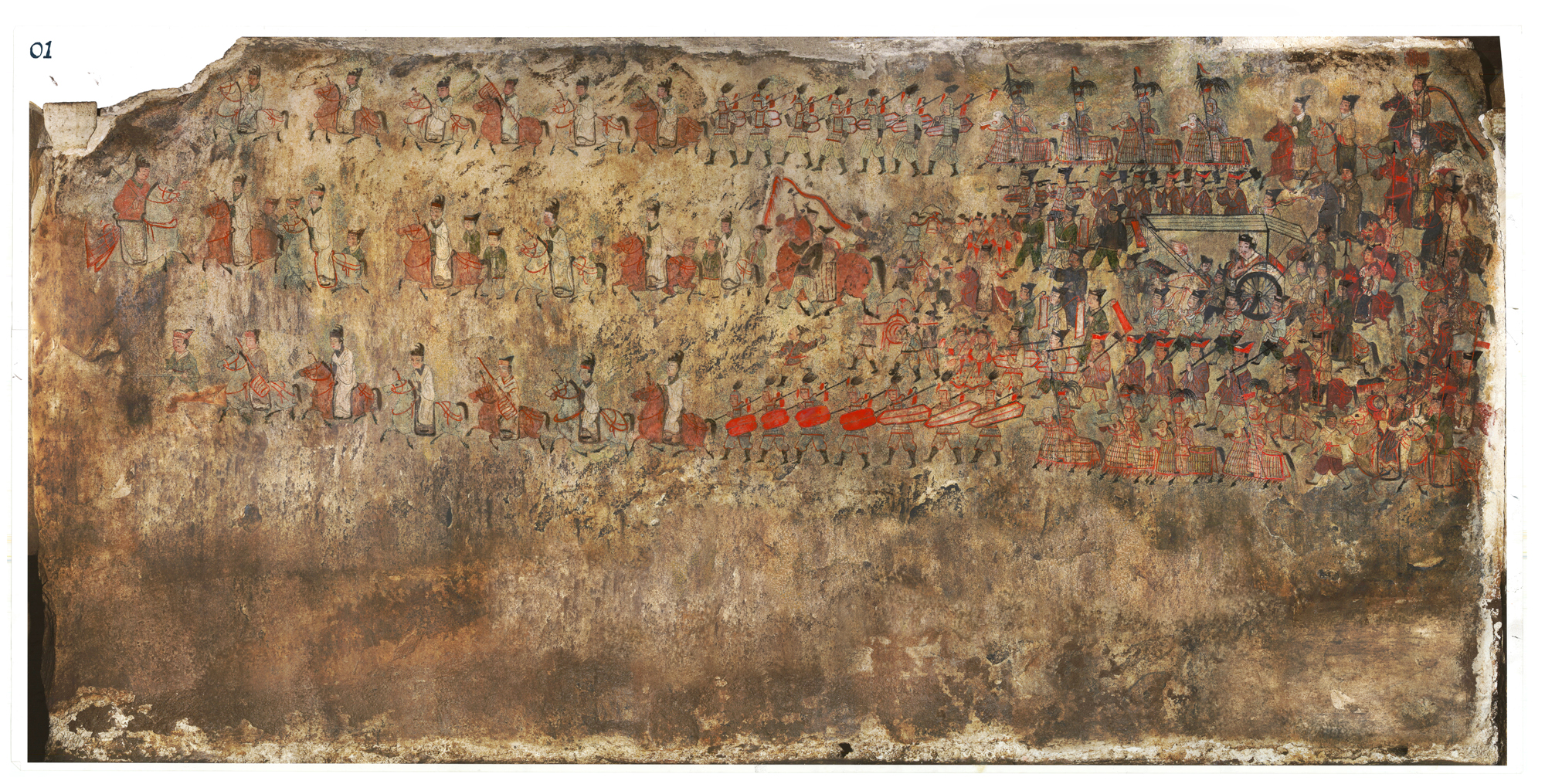
Procession of Dong Shou, a general of Former Yan or Eastern Jin origin who took political asylum in Goguryeo.

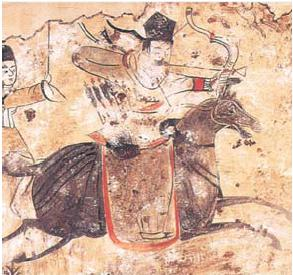
Former Yan horse archer

Single mounting stirrups had already been in use since the Han dynasty, but full double stirrups did not appear until the early 4th century AD. A funerary figurine depicting a stirrup dated 302 AD was unearthed from a Western Jin tomb near Changsha. The stirrup depicted is a mounting stirrup, only placed on one side of the horse, and too short for riding. The earliest reliable representation of a full length double sided riding stirrup was also unearthed from a Jin tomb, this time near Nanjing, dated to the Eastern Jin period, 322 AD. The earliest extant double stirrups were discovered in the tomb of a Northern Yan noble, Feng Sufu, who died in 415 AD. Stirrups have also been found in tombs in Goguryeo, a neighboring state outside of Jin dynasty, dating to the 4th and 5th centuries AD, but these do not contain any specific date. The stirrup appeared to be in widespread use across China by AD 477.

The appearance of the stirrup in China coincided with the rise of armoured cavalry, probably as a result of Xianbei influence. Dated to 357 AD, the tomb of Dong Shou shows fully armoured riders as well as horses. By the end of the 4th century murals depicting horse armour covering the entire body were found in tombs as far as Yunnan. References to "iron cavalry" and "iron horse" began to appear at the same time and instances of captured horse armour in numbers as high as 5,000 and 10,000 are recorded. In addition to the stirrups, Feng Sufu's tomb also contained iron plates for lamellar armour. Sources mention the capture of thousands of "armored horses" in a single battle. Armoured heavy cavalry would dominate Chinese warfare from the 4th century AD to the early Tang dynasty when the military transitioned to light cavalry.

The very earliest Chinese representation of a stirrup comes from a tomb figurine from South China dating to AD 302, but this is a single stirrup that must have been used only for mounting the horse. The earliest figurine with two stirrups probably dates from about 322, and the first actual specimens of stirrups that can be dated precisely and with confidence are from a southern Manchurian burial of 415. However, stirrups have also been found in several other tombs in North China and Manchuria that are most likely of fourth century date. Most of these early Northeast Asian stirrups were oval in shape and made from iron, sometimes solid and sometimes applied over a wooden core, and this form would remain in use for many centuries thereafter.

— David Graff

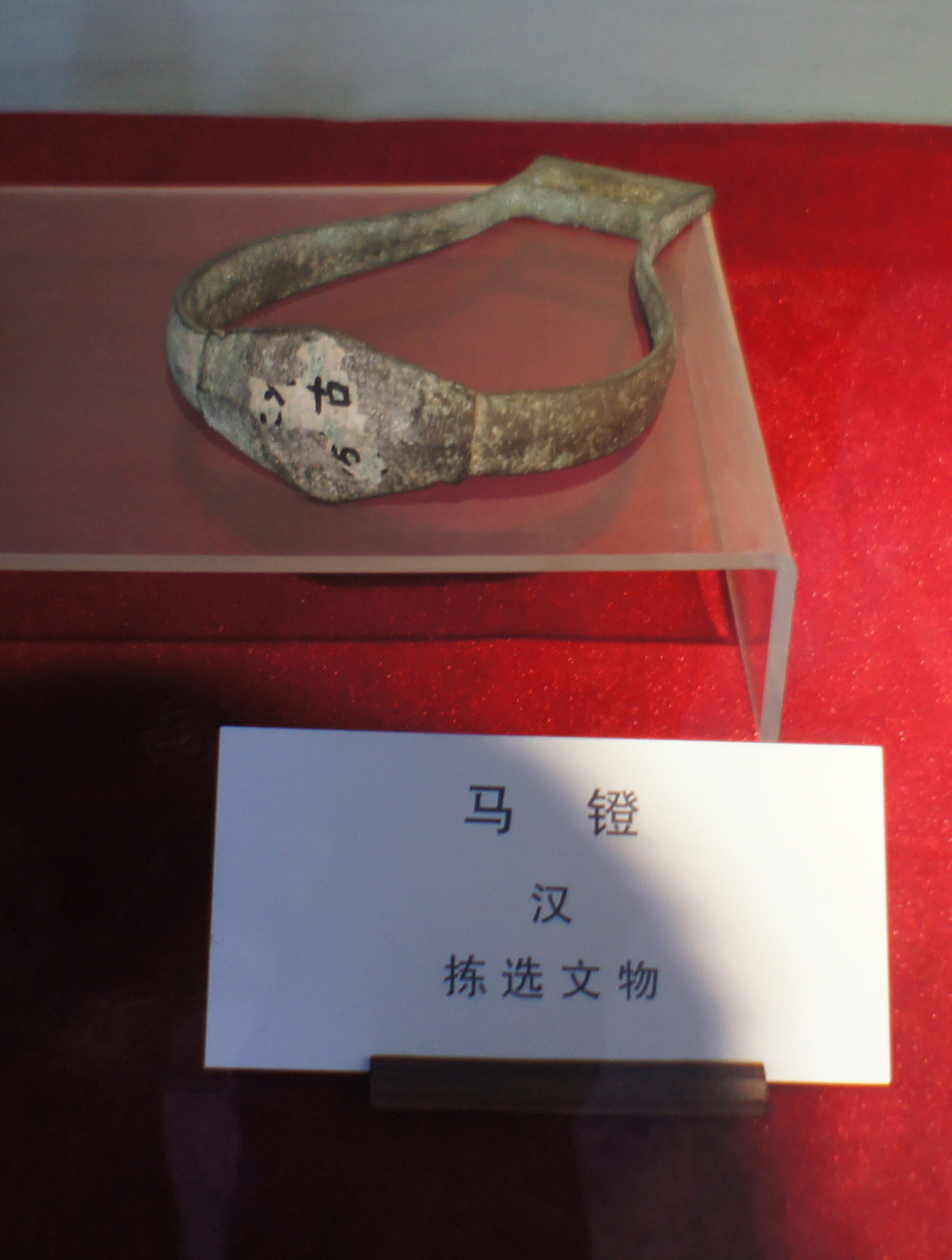
Han dynasty mounting stirrup.

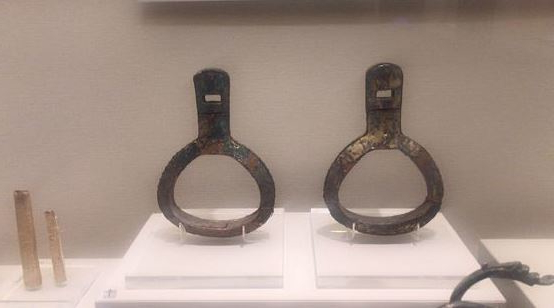
Earliest double stirrups from the tomb of a Han nobleman in Northern Yan, 415 AD

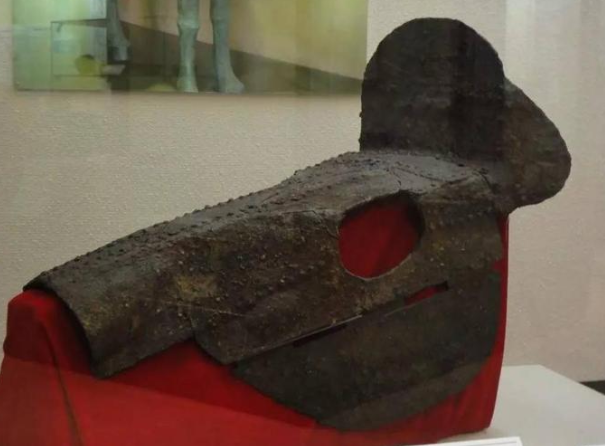
Chanfron, Northern Yan

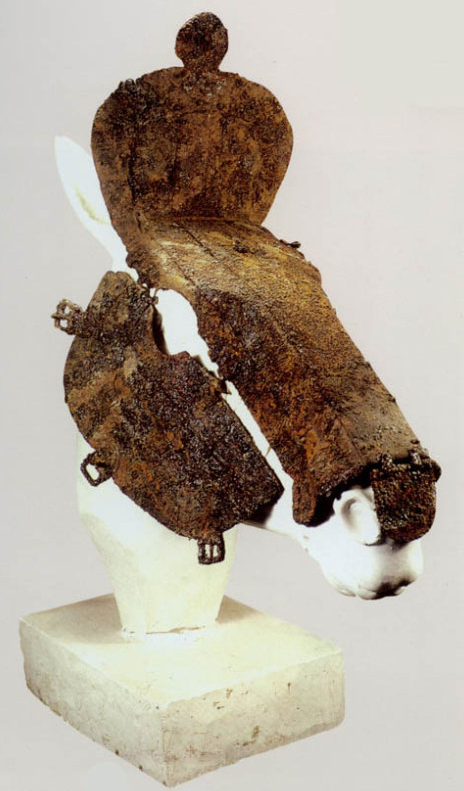
Chanfron, Northern Yan

== Jin ==
=== Sima Yi ===
Timelapse of the Three Kingdoms period.

On 11 December, 220, Cao Pi deposed the last Han emperor and proclaimed himself Emperor of Cao Wei. During his reign Cao Pi alienated his brothers Cao Zhang and Cao Zhi. Cao Pi deeply distrusted his close kin and reduced their powers out of suspicion of their loyalty. His brothers and half-brothers were sent away to their nominal fiefs and kept under strict supervision. Moreover Cao Pi regularly interfered in the status of his kin by promoting, demoting, revoking, and restoring their titles at will.

Cao Pi died in 226 and was succeeded by his son Cao Rui. Although Cao Rui was already twenty years old, he was nonetheless appointed a regency council by his father prior to his death. By 237, three members of the regency council had died, leaving only Sima Yi. Sima Yi descended from an old and established family from the Henei Commandery. His brother, Sima Lang, joined Cao Cao early on in his career and Sima Yi followed him in 208. He became a close friend of Cao Pi and joined his entourage in 217. By 224, Sima Yi was left in charge of domestic affairs. Shu Han and Sun Wu continued to pressure Wei. In 233, Zhuge Liang occupied Wudu Commandery but was checked there by Sima Yi and died the following year. In 238, Sima Yi invaded the Gongsun state in the northeast and annexed it. This was followed by a campaign into Goguryeo in 244 and 245 under the leadership of Guanqiu Jian. Cao Rui died in 239 without any offspring of his own and was succeeded by his seven year old adopted son Cao Fang, who fell under the regency of Cao Shuang and Sima Yi.

Cao Shuang and his friends Wang Bi and He Yan were devotees of a mind altering drug known as Five Minerals Powder. Together they headed a movement which sought to dispose of meaningless formalities in society and opposed the traditional doctrines of Confucianism. In 249, in a coup, Sima Yi had Cao Shuang stripped of his positions and shortly thereafter had him and his associates executed; effectively seizing state power in Wei. He died two years later and was succeeded by his son Sima Shi, then 40 years old.

=== Sima Shi ===
Sima Shi campaigned against Wu and the nomads to the north but achieved no major success against either opponents. Cao Fang tried to retake power for himself in 254 but was pre-emptively attacked by Sima Shi and replaced by his cousin, Cao Mao. In 255 the general Guanqiu Jian rebelled and seized the city of Shouchun. He requested help from Wu, but they were unable to assist him, and the city was retaken by the end of the year. Sima Shi died on 23 March, 255, and was succeeded by his younger brother Sima Zhao.

=== Sima Zhao ===
In 257 the Wei general Zhuge Dan rebelled in Shouchun, also requesting assistance from Wu, but none was forthcoming. He was defeated in 258. In 260 Cao Mao, like his brother, attempted to seize control of the state, but failed and died in the process. In 264 Sima Zhao conquered Shu Han, eliminating one of the Three Kingdoms, after which he proclaimed himself King of Jin. He died the following year and was succeeded by his son Sima Yan, then 30 years old.

=== Western Jin ===
On 8 February 266, Sima Yan deposed the last emperor of Wei, Cao Huan, and proclaimed himself Emperor of the Jin dynasty. In contrast to the close guarded suspicion with which Cao Pi treated his kin, Sima Yan immediately enfeoffed 27 of his relatives as princes with autonomy over their fiefs as well as positions in the military and government. The Jin dynasty was in its inception, essentially a family run enterprise.

In the northwestern Qin Province, the Xianbei rebelled under Tufa Shujineng. The Jin sent armies against them twice, in 270 and 271, but were defeated on both occasions. Sensing weakness, the Xiongnu leader Liu Meng also started raiding Jin territory, however he was killed in 272. Tufa Shujineng was defeated in 279 and order was restored to the region.

In the spring of 280, Jin launched an invasion of Wu from the north and west, led by Sima Zhou and Wang Jun respectively. Sun Hao surrendered on 1 May 280 when his troops deserted him, putting an end to the era of the Three Kingdoms.

=== War of the Eight Princes ===
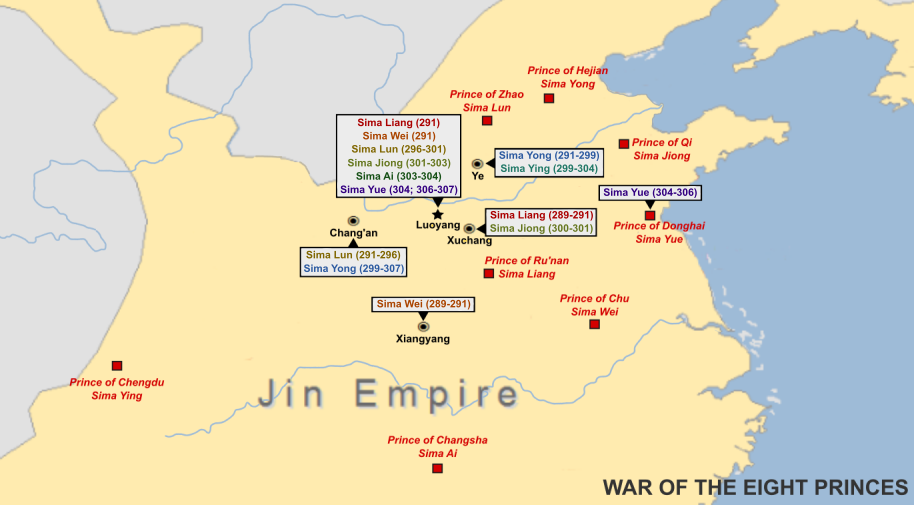
Map showing the War of the Eight Princes in Jin dynasty.

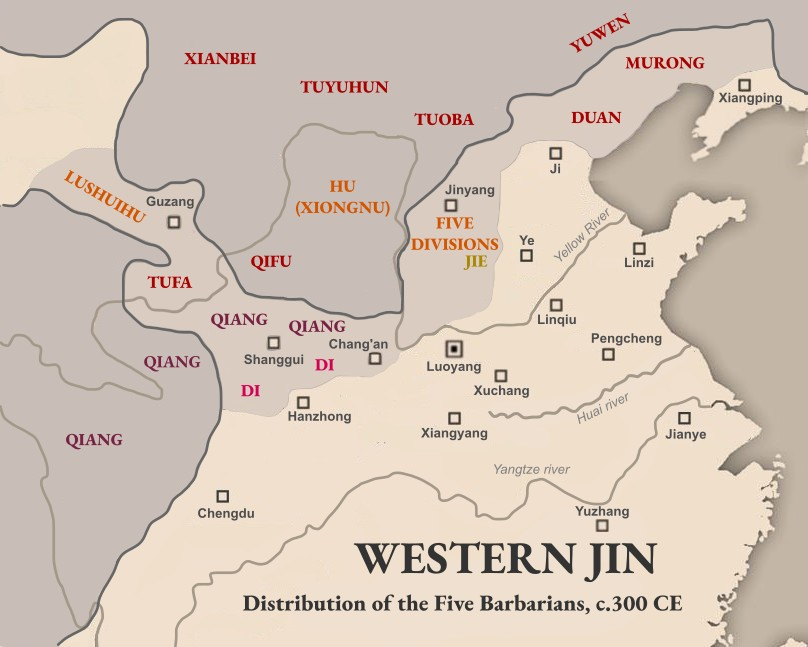
Distribution of the Five Barbarians.

Sima Yan, Emperor Wu of Jin, died on 16 May 290, and was succeeded by his son and crown prince Sima Zhong, posthumously Emperor Hui of Jin. Emperor Hui proved to be mentally deficient, possibly even mentally handicapped, and his father was aware of the situation. However he feared that to skip his eldest son in the line of succession would destabilize the empire with a succession struggle, so he maintained Zhong's position as heir apparent. The decision proved to be a disaster. Upon Sima Zhong's accession, the former empress' uncle Yang Jun took regency and removed his rival Sima Liang from power. Emperor Hui's wife Jia Nanfeng organized a coup and removed Yang Jun from power on 23 April 291. With assistance from the empress, the fifth son of Sima Yan, Sima Wei, then killed Liang. The empress Jia Nanfeng turned on Wei and killed him immediately afterwards, becoming de facto ruler of Jin.

In 296 the Di leader Qi Wannian rebelled. He was killed in 299. Another Di leader Yang Maosou set up the state of Chouchi south of Tianshui

On 27 April 300, Empress Jia Nanfeng had the heir apparent Sima Yu killed. On 7 May 300, Sima Lun (Emperor Wu's uncle), Sima Yong (Wu's second cousin) and Sima Jiong (Wu's nephew), rebelled in Luoyang. They imprisoned Jia Nanfeng and forced her to commit suicide a few days later. Emperor Wu's son Sima Yun attempted to oust Lun from power but was killed in a skirmish. On 3 February 301, Lun forced Emperor Hui to abdicate and took the throne for himself. In April, Sima Yong, Sima Jiong, and Sima Ying defeated Lun and restored Emperor Hui with Jiong as regent. In May 302, the last sons of Yu died, and the line of succession fell into confusion. Sima Ai removed Jiong from power in January 303 and took regency for himself. The next year (304), Ying and Yong attacked Ai. While Ai managed to hold off their forces, he was betrayed by Sima Yue. Ai was burnt at the stake by Zhang Fang on 19 March 304. On 1 May 304, Ying became heir apparent. Yue became jealous and attacked Ying at Ye city, but was utterly defeated and the emperor was captured by the enemy forces. In the north, the general Wang Jun, previously under the Jia regime, attacked Ying, forcing him to flee to Luoyang. Ying was usurped by Zhang Fang. Zhang Fang moved the court west to Chang'an where he was killed early in 306 by Yong. On 5 June, Chang'an was captured by a Wuhuan and Xianbei army under Wang Jun's general Ji Hong. Yong and Ying were killed in late 306, while Yue took control of the court.

Meanwhile in the southwest, Li Xiong created the Ba Di state of Cheng-Han in 304.

Emperor Hui died on 8 January 307 and was succeeded by his younger brother, Sima Chi, posthumously Emperor Huai of Jin. The court had exhausted most of its power with feuds between the imperial family and the empire fell into chaos. In 308 the bandit Wang Mi captured Xuchang.

War of the Eight Princes (291-306)
Prince	Parentage	Title	Lifespan
Sima Liang	Sima Yi, Lady Fu	Prince of Ru'nan	233-291
Sima Wei	Sima Yan, Consort Shen	Prince of Chu	271-291
Sima Lun	Sima Yi, Lady Bai	Prince of Zhao	250-301
Sima Jiong	Sima You	Prince of Qi	?-302
Sima Ai (Yi)	Sima Yan, Consort Shen	Prince of Changsha	277-304
Sima Ying	Sima Yan, Lady Cheng	Prince of Chengdu	279-306
Sima Yong	Sima Gui	Prince of Hejian	?-307
Sima Yue	Sima Tai	Prince of Donghai	?-311

Jin Dynasty and Chu

- – Western Jin dynasty emperor;
- – Eastern Jin dynasty emperor;
- – The Eight Princes
- - - - - - = The dashed line denotes an adoption

Sima Ang 司馬昂 d. 205 BC; Yinwang 殷王; 206–205 BC
skipped generations
Sima Jun 司馬儁; 113–197
Sima Fang 司馬防; 149–219
Sima Lang 司馬朗; 171–217	Sima Fu 司馬孚; 180–272	Sima Yi 司馬懿; 179–251; Xuandi 宣帝	Sima Kui 司馬馗
Sima Wang 司馬望 205–271; Prince of Langyang	Sima Gui 司馬瑰 d. 274; Prince of Taiyuan	Sima Zhao 司馬昭 211–265; Wendi 文帝	Sima Liang 司馬亮 d. 291; Prince of Runan	Sima Lun 司馬倫 r.301?; d. 301; Prince of Zhao	Sima Shi 司馬師; 208–255; Jingdi 景帝	Sima Zhou 司馬伷; 227–283	Sima Tai 司馬泰 d. 299; Prince of Gaomi
Sima Yong 司馬顒 d. 306; Prince of Hejian	Sima Yan 司馬炎; 236–290; Wudi 武帝; 265–290	Sima You 司馬攸; 248–283; Prince of Qi	Sima Jin 司馬覲 256–290; Prince of Langye	Sima Yue 司馬越 d. 311; Prince of Donghai	Sima Mo 司馬模 d. 311; Prince of Nanyang
Sima Zhong 司馬衷; 259–307; Huidi 惠帝; 290–307	Sima Wei 司馬瑋; 271–291; Prince of Chu	Sima Ai 司馬乂; 277–304; Prince of Changsha	Sima Jiong 司馬冏 d. 302; Prince of Qi	Sima Rui 司馬睿; 276–323; Yuandi 元帝; 317–323	Sima Bao 司馬保; 294–320; Yuanwang 元王; 319–320
Sima Yu 司馬遹; 278–300; Crown Prince	Sima Ying 司馬穎 279–306; Prince of Chengdu	Sima Yan 司馬晏283–313; Prince of Wu	Sima Chi 司馬熾; 284–313; Huaidi 懷帝; 307–311
Huan Yi 桓彝; 276–328	Sima Ye 司馬業; 300–318; Mindi 愍帝; 313–316	Sima Shao 司馬紹; 299–326; Mingdi 明帝; 323–326	Sima Yu 司馬昱; 320–372; Jianwen 簡文; 371–372
Huan Chong 桓沖 328–384; Prince of Xuancheng	Huan Wen 桓溫 312–373; Xuanwu 宣武	Sima Xingnan 司馬興男	Sima Yan 司馬衍; 321–342; Chengdi 成帝; 326–342	Sima Yue 司馬岳; 322–344; Kangdi 康帝; 342–344	Sima Yao 司馬曜; 362–396; Xiaowu 孝武; 372–396	Sima Daozi 司馬道子; 364–403; Prince of Kuaiji
Huan Xuan 桓玄 369–404; Wudao 武悼 of Chu; 403–404	Sima Pi 司馬丕; 341–365; Aidi 哀帝; 361–365	Sima Yi 司馬奕; 342–386; Feidi 廢帝; 365–371	Sima Dan 司馬聃; 343–361; Mudi 穆帝; 344–361	Sima Dezong; 382–419; Andi 安帝; 396–403; 404–419	Sima Dewen 司馬德文 386–421; Gongdi 恭帝; 419–420	Sima Yuanxian 司馬元顯; 382–402; Heir Apparent; Zhongof Kuaiji
Emperor Shao of Liu Song (劉)宋少帝; 406–422–424	Sima Maoying 司馬茂英; 393?–439

=== Uprising of the Five Barbarians ===
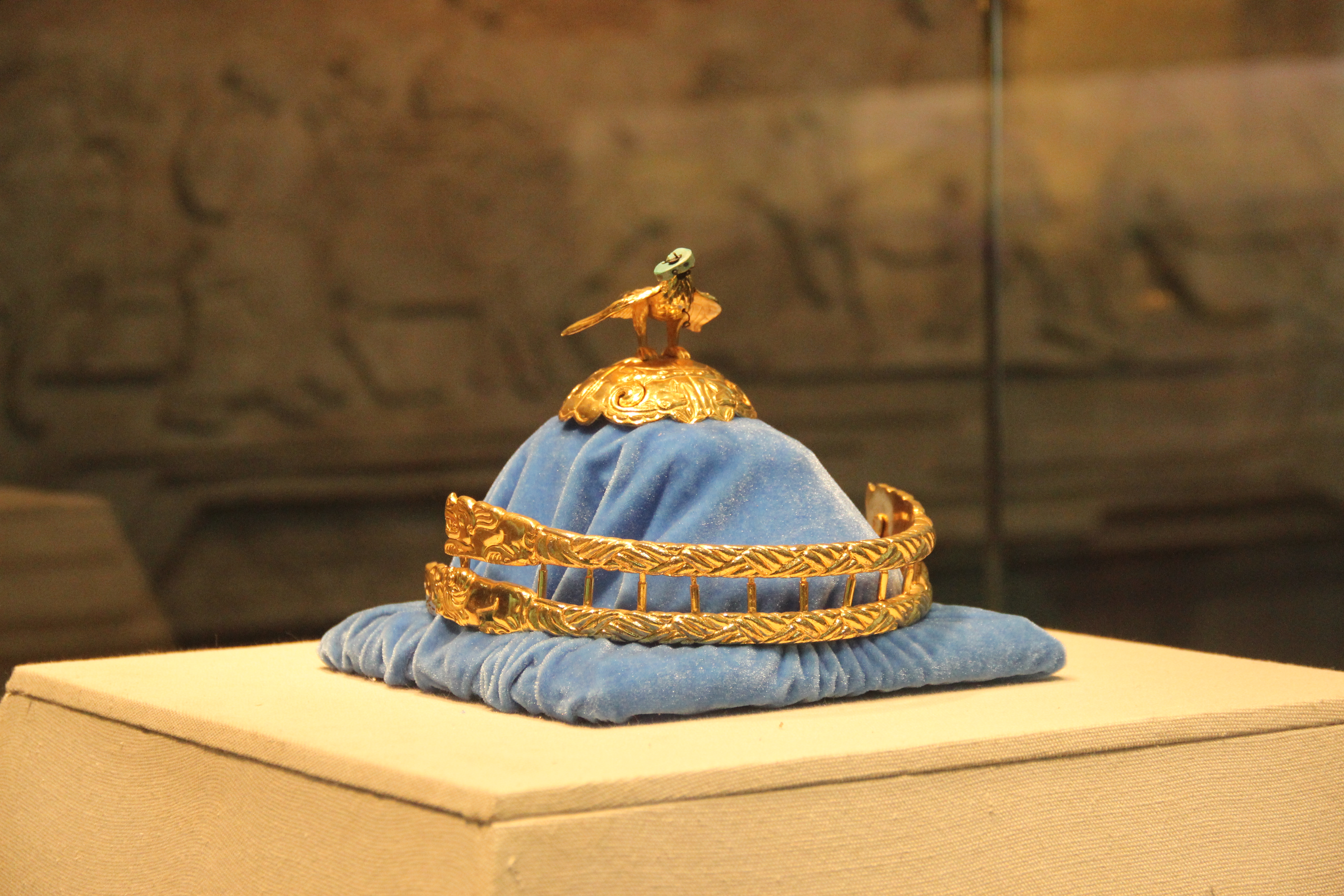
Xiongnu gold crown, Warring States period

During the last years of the War of the Eight Princes, five groups of barbarian peoples, collectively known as the Five Barbarians invaded China.

When Wang Jun brought Wuhuan and Xianbei troops from the north to attack Sima Ying in the south, Ying released the Xiongnu chieftain Liu Yuan in the hope that he would rally the Xiongnu to his cause. According to the Book of Wei, Liu Yuan was 184 cm tall and had red strains in his long beard. While Liu Yuan did raise an army, he was too late to be of any help to Ying. Instead Liu Yuan declared himself Emperor of the Han dynasty in Bing Province. The ones responsible for defending Bing Province either fled or were killed. Liu Yuan died in 310 and was succeeded by his son Liu Cong. On 13 July 311, Liu Cong's general, Shi Le, sacked the Jin capital of Luoyang and took Emperor Huai of Jin as hostage. The fall of Luoyang came to be known as the Disaster of Yongjia.

In 313 Goguryeo conquered Lelang Commandery. Jin general Zu Ti moved north with a few thousand volunteers and recovered Henan.

Emperor Huai died in captivity in 313 and was succeeded by his 11 year old nephew Sima Ye, posthumously Emperor Min of Jin. In 315 Tuoba Yilu became King of Dai for his service under the Jin. Chang'an was surrounded by the Xiongnu and finally surrendered in 316, though it would be retaken the next year. Emperor Min was taken and killed a few months later.

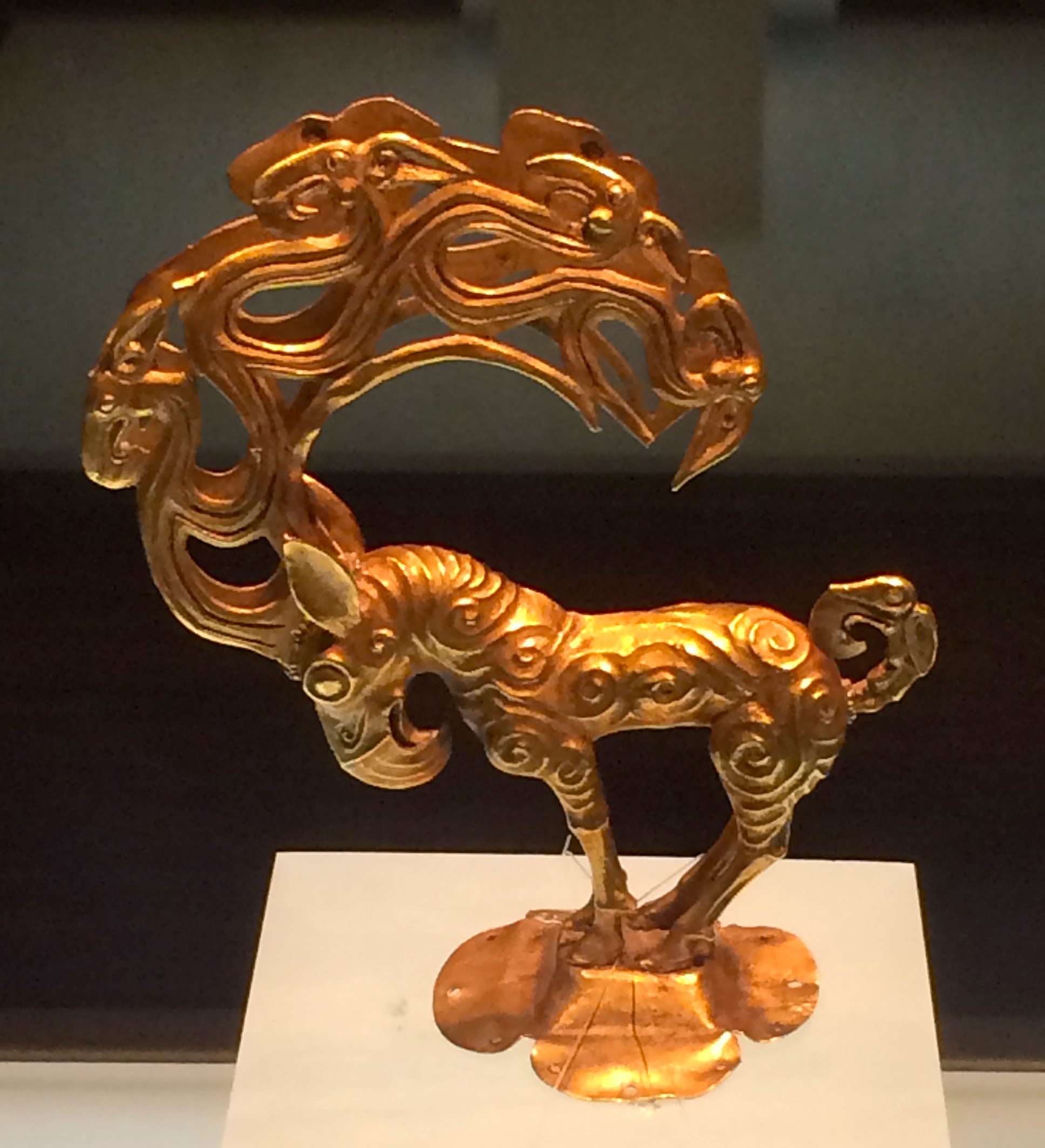
Xiongnu gold sculpture

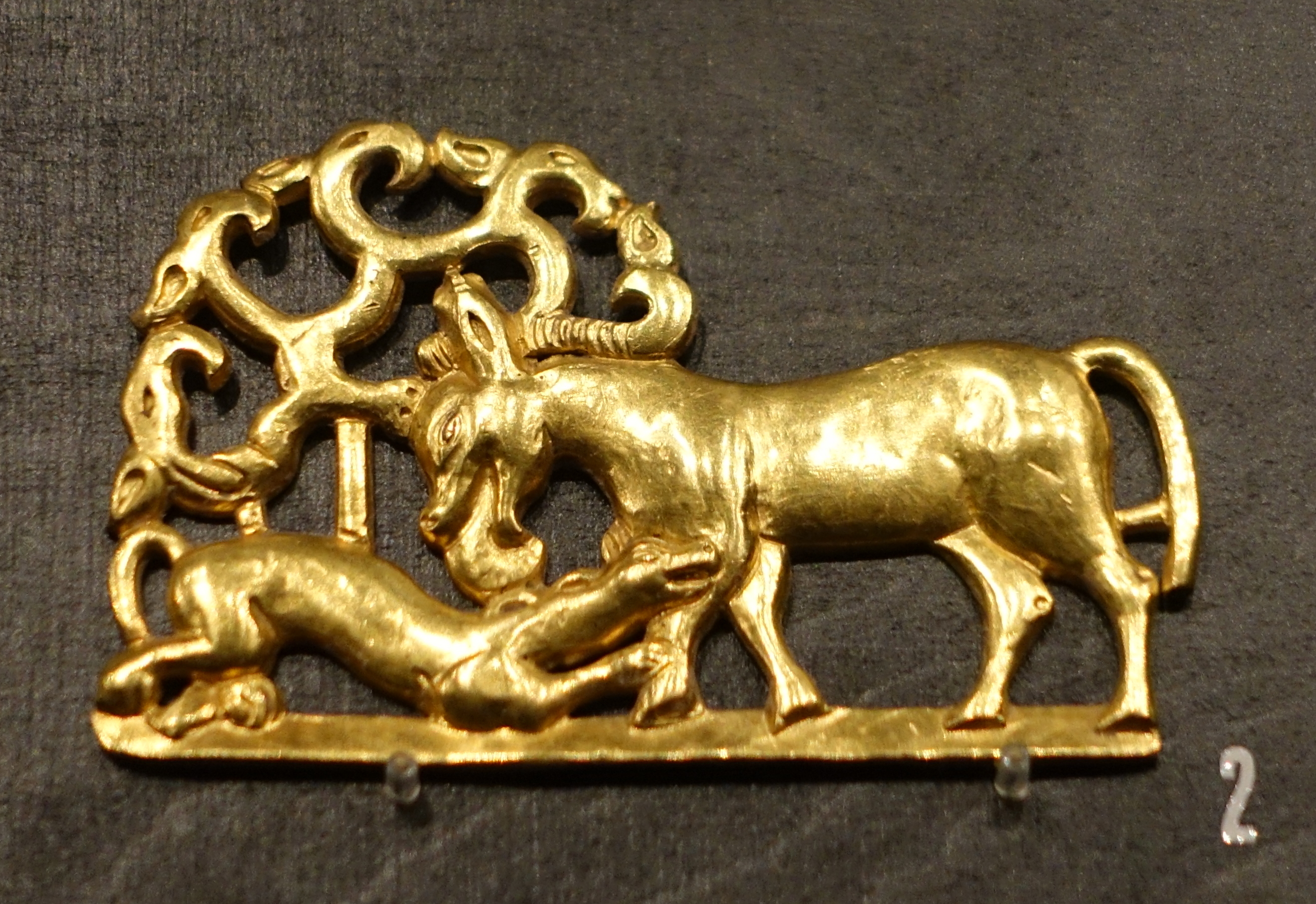
Xiongnu art depicting two creatures in a fight

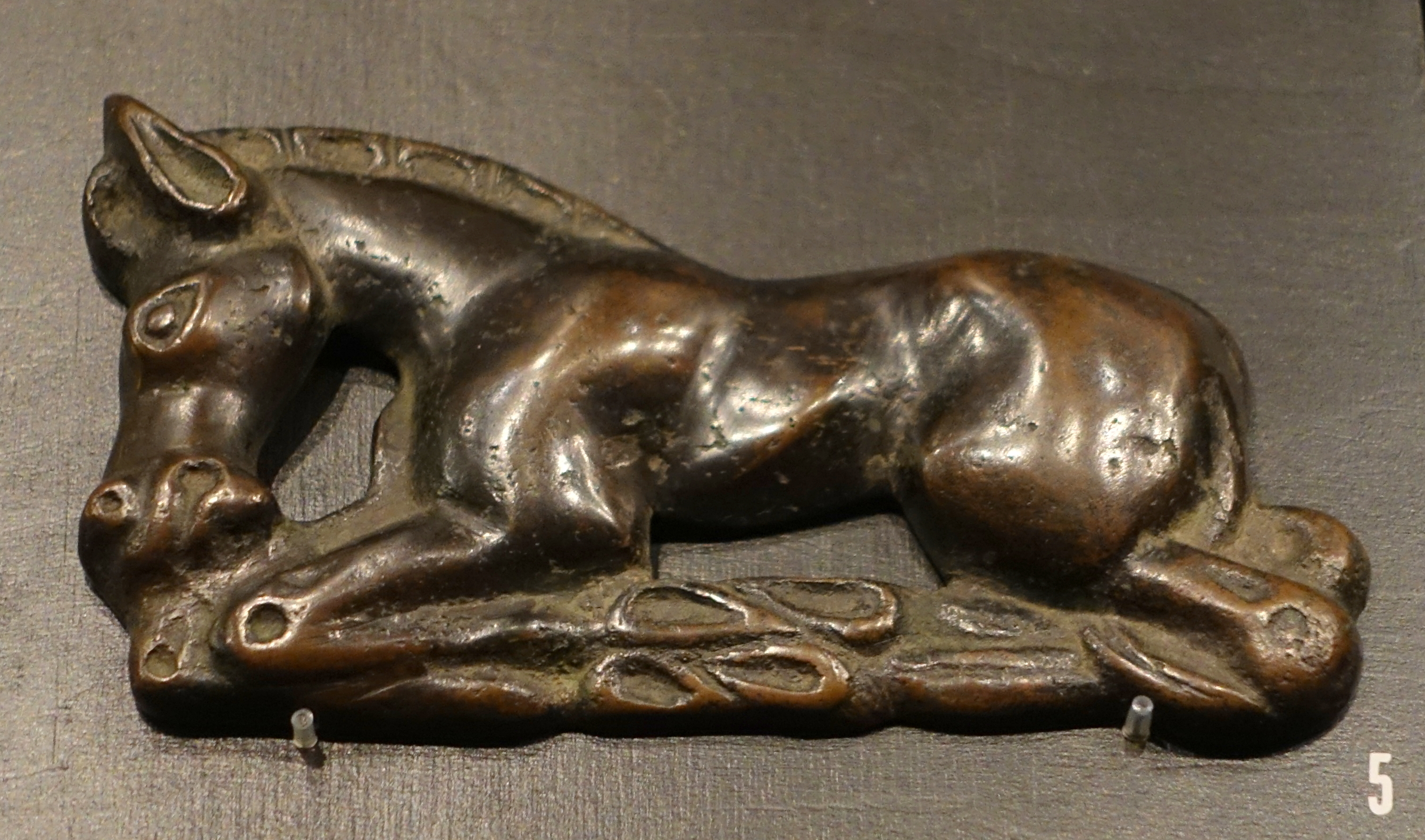
Xiongnu depiction of a wild ass

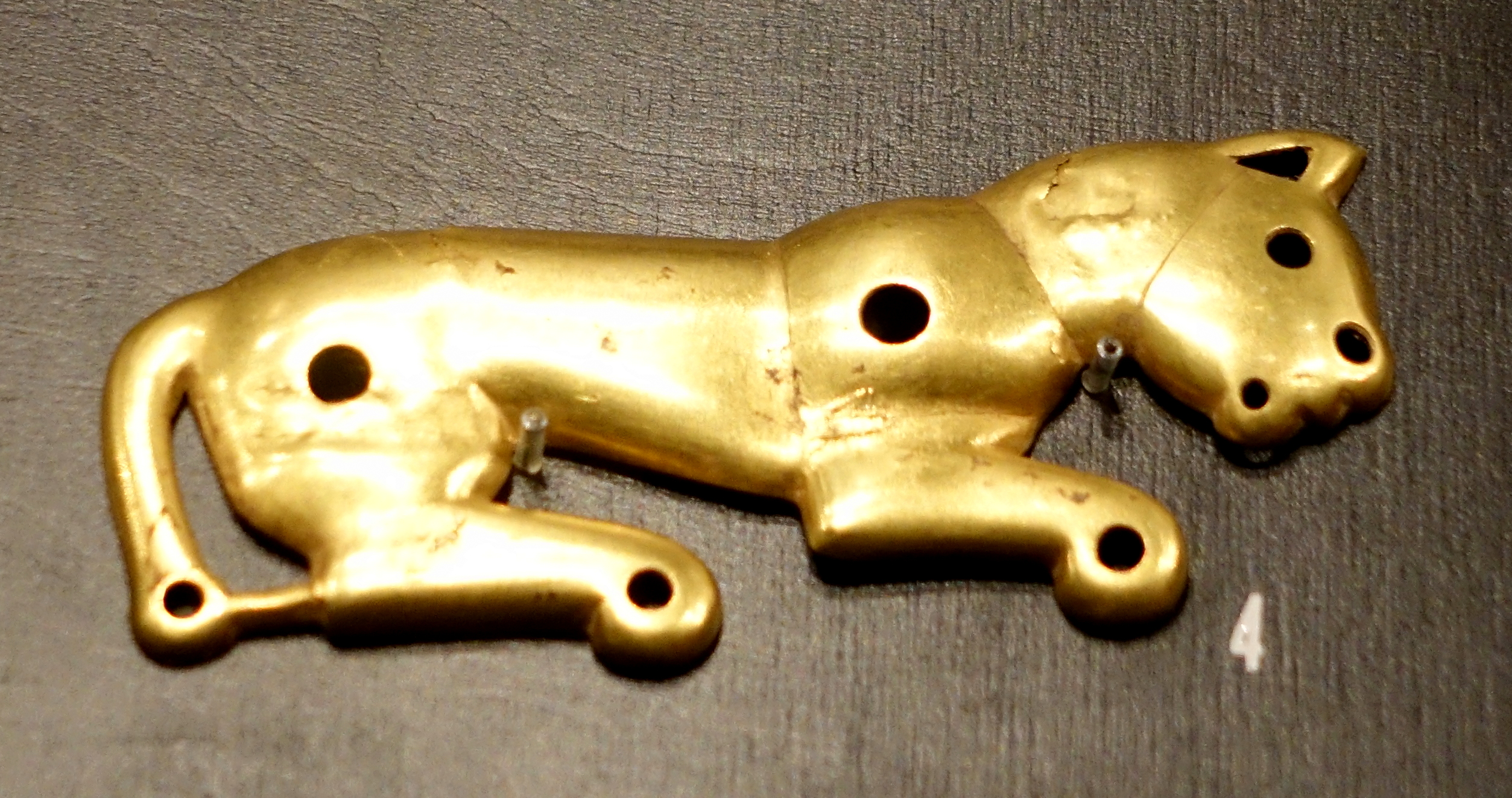
Xiongnu depiction of a tiger

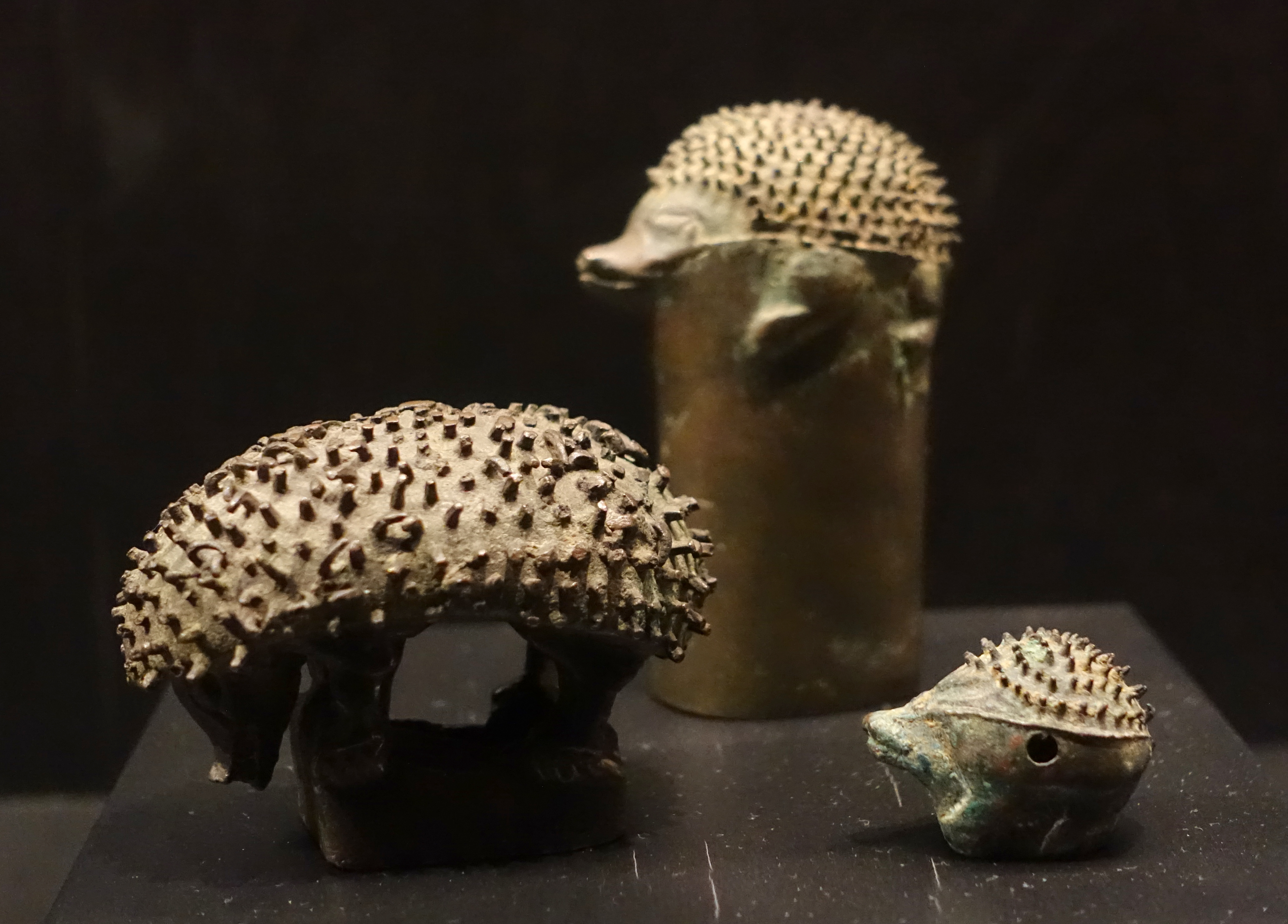
Xiongnu hedgehog sculptures

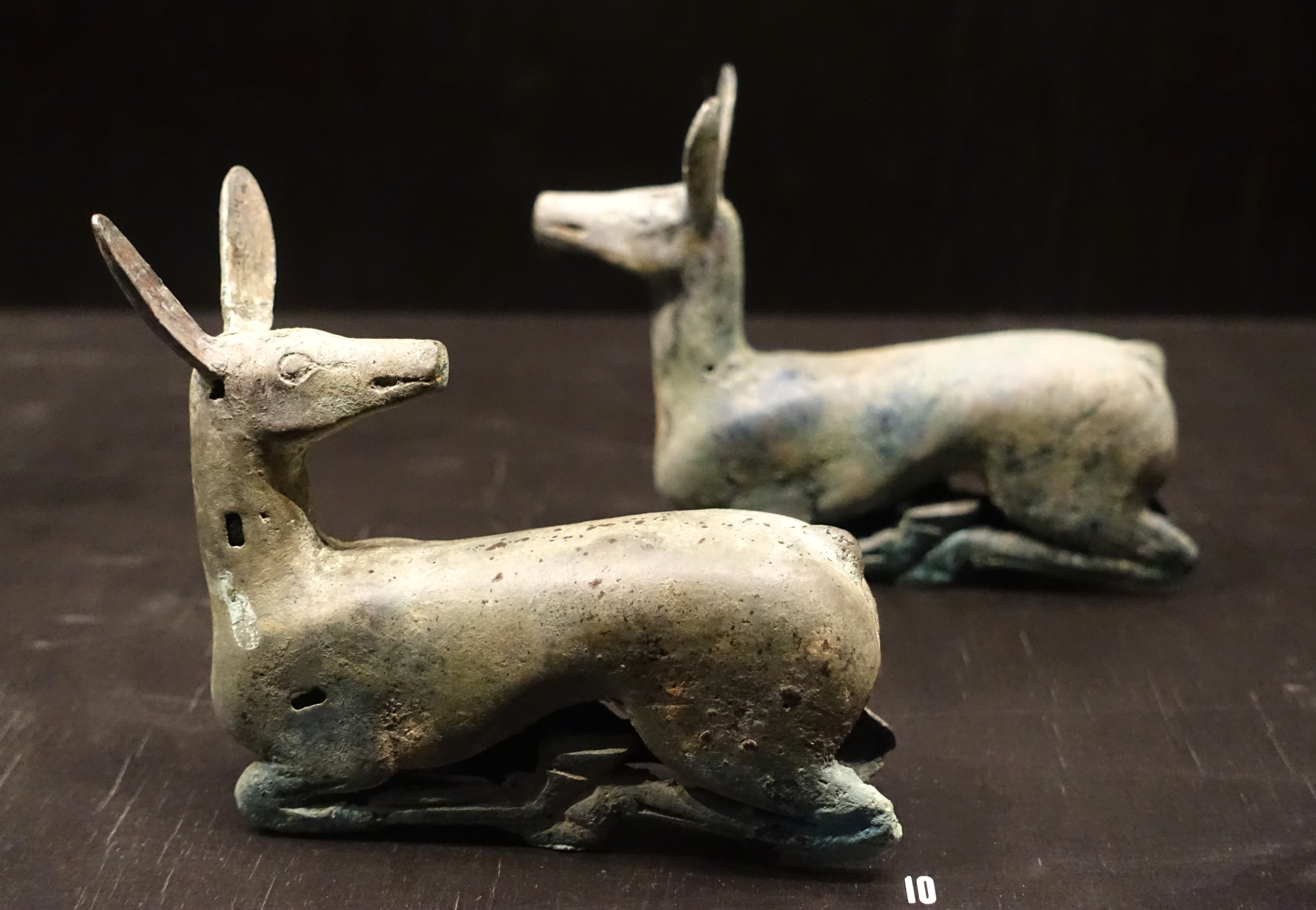
Xiongnu depiction of deer

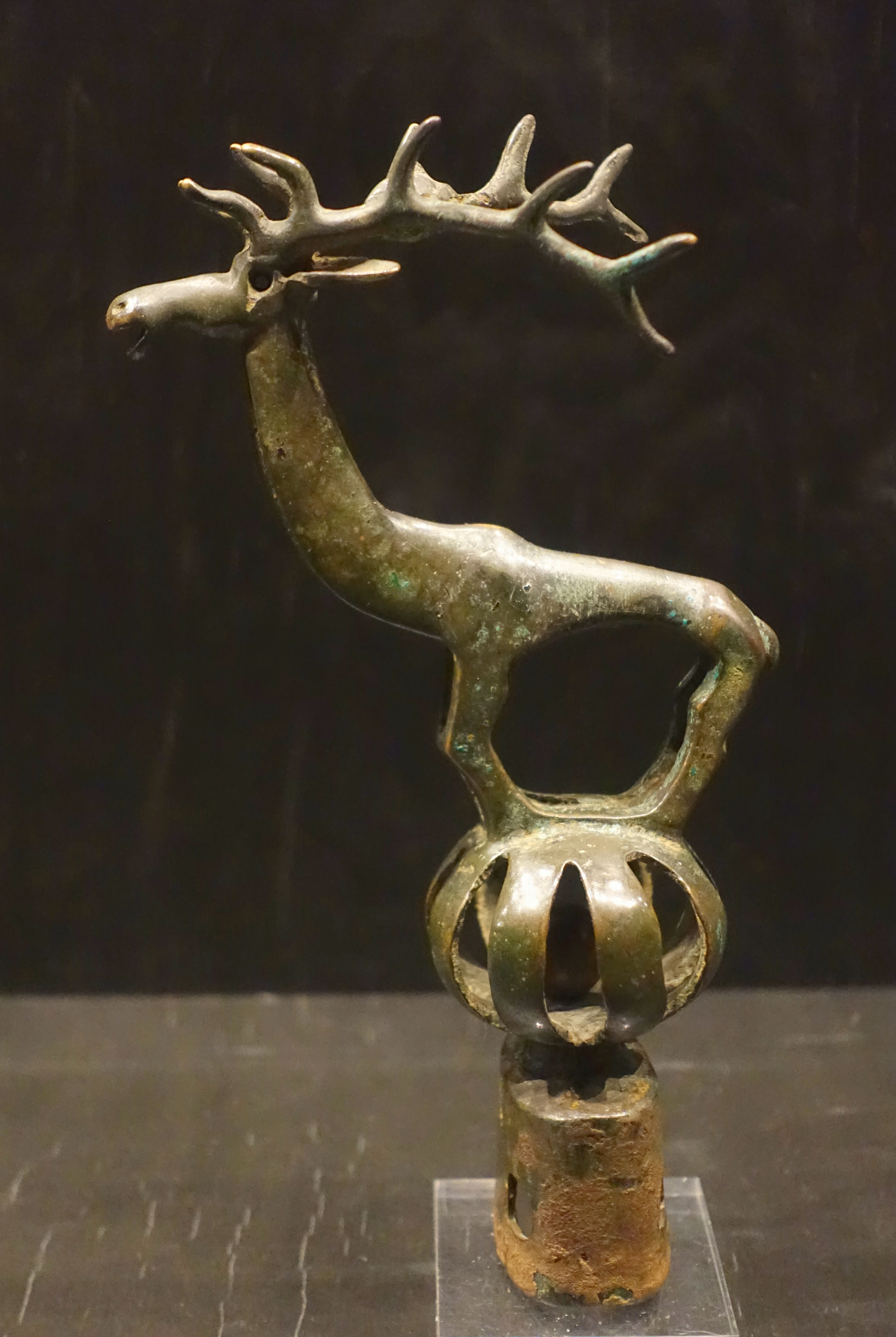
Xiongnu depiction of a stag

=== Eastern Jin ===
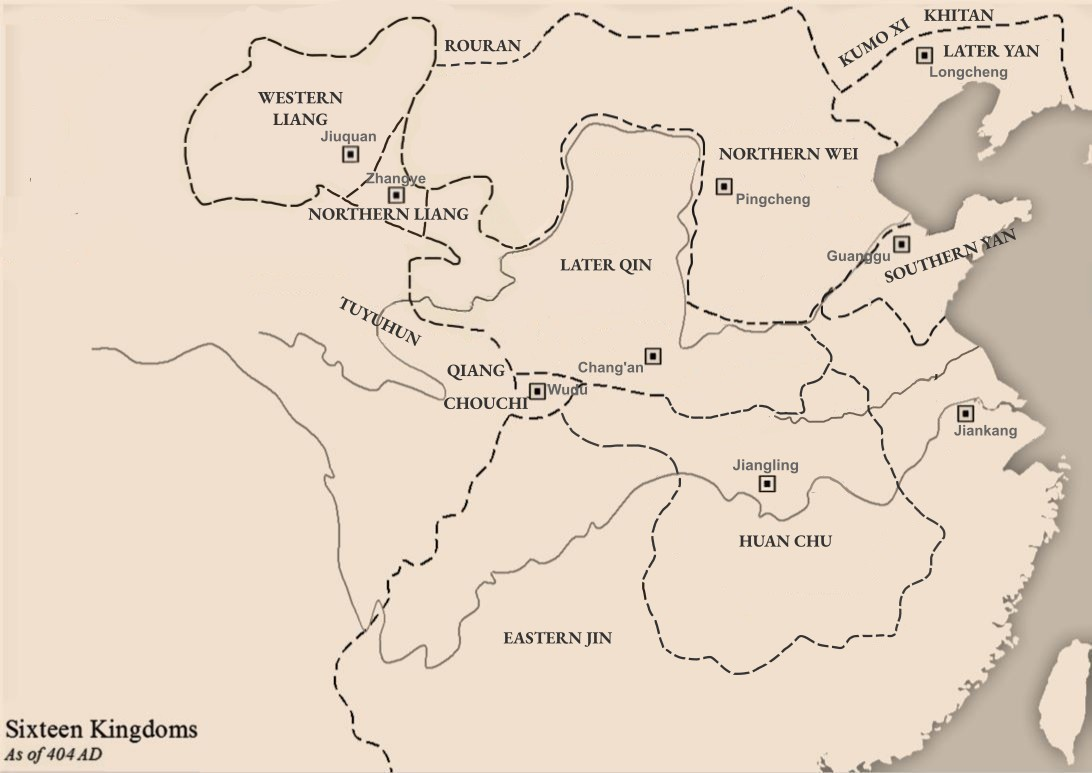
404 AD

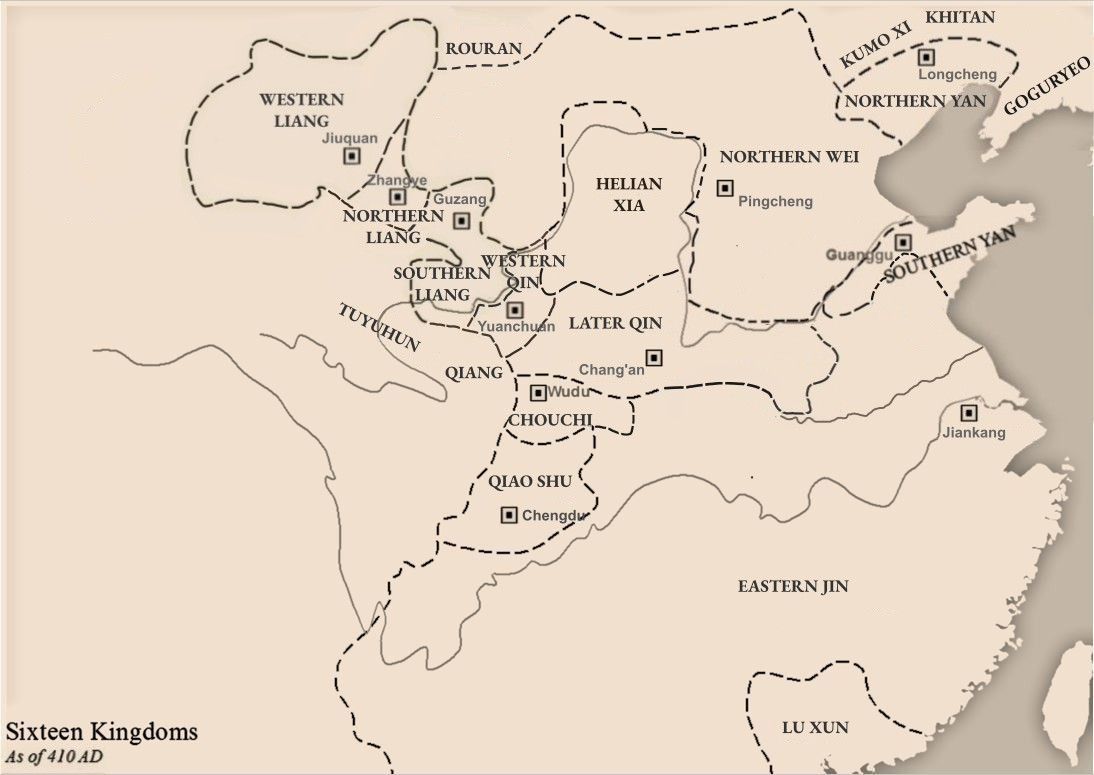
410 AD

In 318 Sima Rui, posthumously Emperor Yuan of Jin, declared himself emperor at Jiankang, thus becoming the first ruler of Eastern Jin.

In 319, Shi Le defeated Jin general Zu Ti at Xunyi and declared himself Prince of [Later] Zhao.

In 321, the secretariat Diao Xie convinced the emperor confiscate slaves and other independent retainers from powerful families. This sparked a rebellion by Wang Dun in 322. From Wuchang, Wang Dun descended on the Changjiang and defeated Diao Xie's army of ex-slaves. He set up his headquarters in Gushu, within striking distance of the capital. However Wang then became seriously ill and died in 324. Zu Ti died and the Henan region was lost.

Meanwhile Sima Rui died and was succeeded by his son, Sima Shao, posthumously Emperor Ming of Jin.

In 325, Sima Shao died and was succeeded by Sima Yan, Emperor Cheng of Jin.

Su Jun rebelled in 327 and sacked Jiankang in 328. The Jin court was able to suppress the rebellion with the help of Tao Kan, but Tao Kan himself set up a semi-independent state in the middle of the Changjiang.

In 342, Sima Yan died and was succeeded by Sima Yue, posthumously Emperor Kang of Jin.

In 344, Sima Yue died and was succeeded by Sima Dan, posthumously Emperor Mu of Jin.

In 347, Jin conquered Cheng-Han. A Lâm Ấp invasion was defeated.

In 349, Chu Pou of Jin carried out a failed northern expedition.

In 353, Yin Hao of Jin led a northern expedition that ended in disaster when its Qiang allies betrayed them.

In 354, Huan Wen led 40,000 men north and defeated a Former Qin army at Guanzhong but withdrew due to logistical difficulties.

In 356, Zhou Cheng and Yao Xiang of the Qiang people laid siege to Luoyang but were defeated by Huan Wen.

In 359, Xie Wan of Jin led a failed northern expedition. Lâm Ấp was defeated in battle.

In 361, Huan Wen defeated Former Yan and took Xuchang. Sima Dan died and was succeeded by Sima Pi, posthumously Emperor Ai of Jin.

In 364, Murong Wei invaded and took Xuchang.

In 365, Murong Wei took Luoyang. Sima Pi died and was succeeded by Sima Yi, posthumously Emperor Fei of Jin.

In 369, Huan Wen led 50,000 men north and was defeated by Murong Chui at Xiangyi (襄邑) (Suixian, Henan).

In 371, Huan Wen deposed Sima Yi and enthroned Sima Yu, posthumously Emperor Jianwen of Jin.

In 372, Sima Yu died and was succeeded by Sima Yao, posthumously Emperor Xiaowu of Jin.

In 373, Former Qin seized Sichuan. Huan Wen died.

In 377, Li Xun seized Jiuzhen.

In 379, Former Qin seized Xiangyang.

In 380, Teng Dunzhi became governor of Jiaozhi after Du Yuan killed Li Xun.

=== Battle of Fei River ===
In 383, a Jin army attacked Xiangyang and was repelled by a Qin relief force of 50,000. The Qin committed an all out attack on the south, mobilizing 270,000 cavalry and 600,000 infantry. Shouchun fell to the Qin vanguard (250,000) under Fu Rong. A Qin force 50,000 strong moved east to block a Jin army of 70,000. Disaster struck when a small Jin strike force of only 5,000 attacked the Qin position at night, dealing 15,000 casualties. The Jin army continued its march to Fei River, where it met the larger force under Fu Rong. Seeing that the situation had come to a stalemate at the river, the Jin commander offered Fu Rong to a fair battle if he would let them cross the river, and thus grant the Qin a much better position with their larger army. Fu Rong consented, but as he signaled to move back and make room for the Jin, the army fell into disarray, causing a panic stricken rout. Fu Rong himself was caught up in the commotion and killed in the stampede.

=== Collapse ===
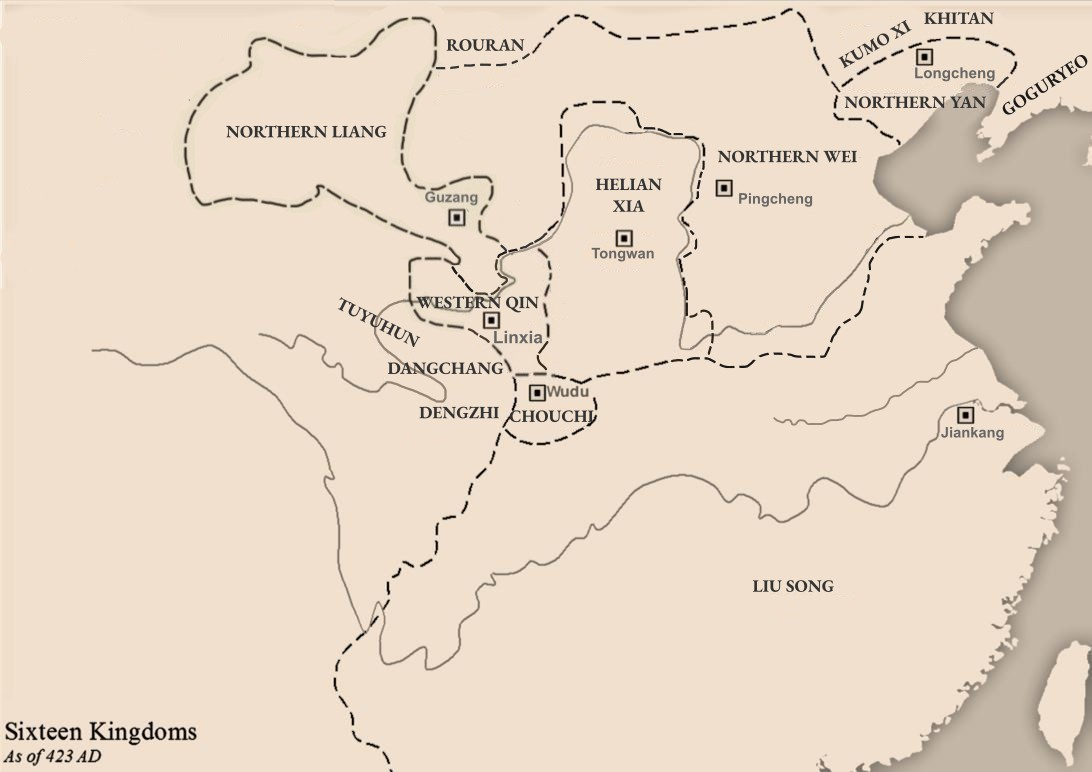
423 AD

In 385, the Sichuan basin and Henan were reincorporated into the Jin empire.

In 396, Sima Yao died and was succeeded by Sima Dezong, posthumously Emperor An of Jin.

Wang Gong rebelled in 398 and was defeated.

Sun En rebelled in 399 and was not defeated until 402. The surviving rebels fled with Lu Xun to Guangzhou, where they were defeated in 405. Lâm Ấp attacked Jiaozhi.

Meanwhile, Huan Xuan had sacked Jiankang in 402 and created a large territory for himself while the government was busy with Sun En. The Jin's primary general Liu Laozhi chose to defect to Huan's side, but he was killed. Huan declared himself emperor at the end of 403. Liu Laozhi's former lieutenant Liu Yu marched on Jiankang, forcing Huan to retreat to Jiangling before returning with a much larger force. The decisive battle was fought on Zhengrong Island, near modern Echeng, on 10 June 404. Both sides arrived with their flotillas. Liu's subordinate Liu Yi took advantage of the upwind position to set fire to Huan's ships. The ensuing chaos destroyed Huan's army and he was forced to flee to Sichuan where he was killed by one of his associates.

In 405, Qiao Zong rebelled in Chengdu. Lâm Ấp attacked Jiaozhi.

In 410, Liu Yu conquered Southern Yan. Lu Xun tried to take Jiankang but failed. He eventually died in Jiaozhi.

In 412, Liu Yu eliminated Liu Yi and became the dominant military power in the Jin dynasty.

In 413, Qiaozong was defeated. Lâm Ấp attacked Jiaozhi.

In 415, Lâm Ấp attacked Jiaozhi.

In 416, Jin retook Luoyang from Later Qin

In 417, Jin conquered Later Qin and retook Chang'an, but retreated the next year.

=== Liu Song ===
In 420, Liu Yu usurped the Jin throne and replaced it with his own Liu Song dynasty.

== Sixteen Kingdoms (and minor states) ==
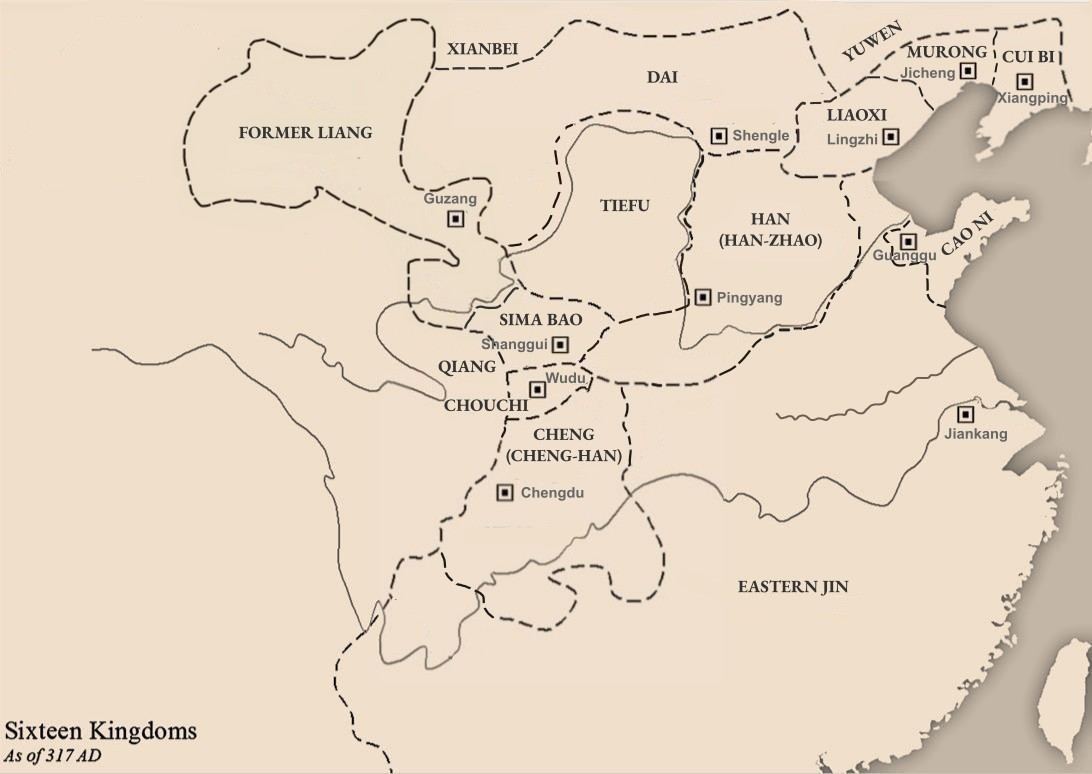
317 AD

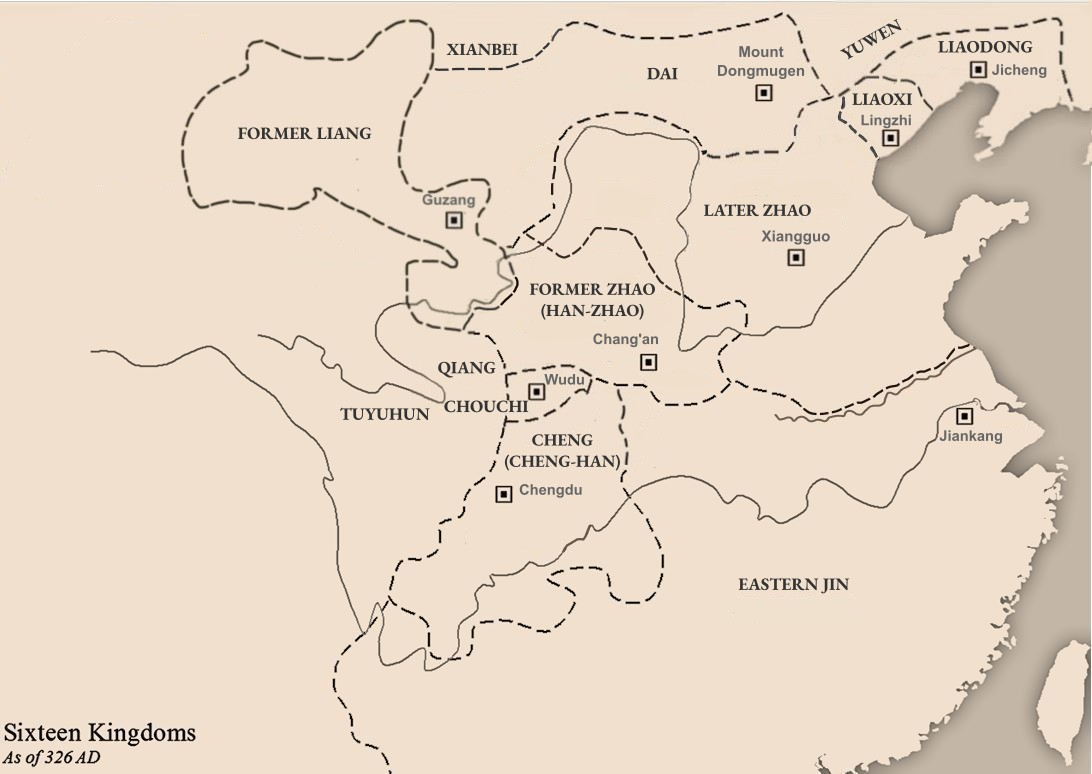
326 AD

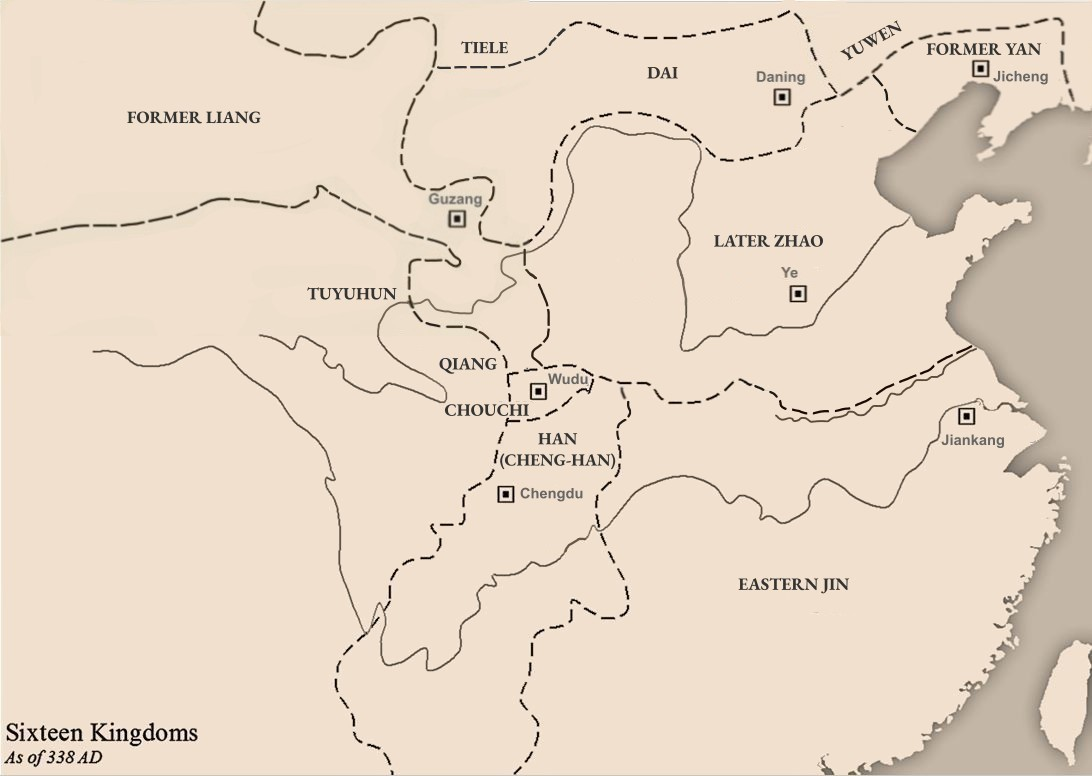
338 AD

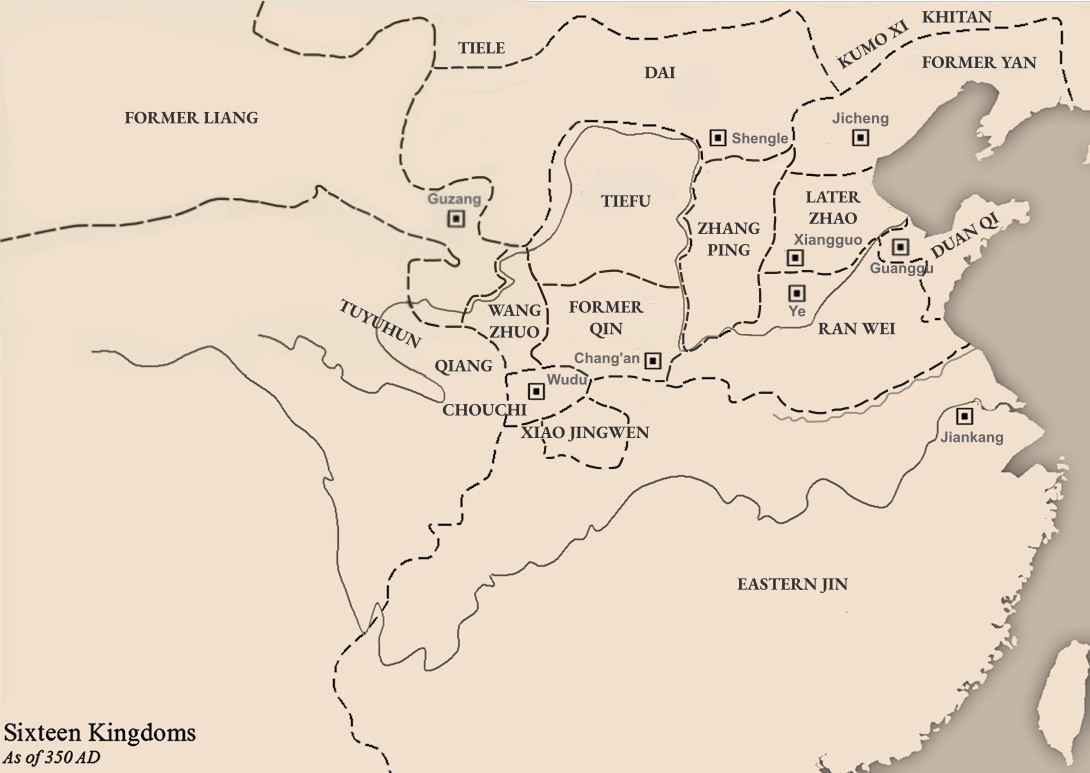
350 AD

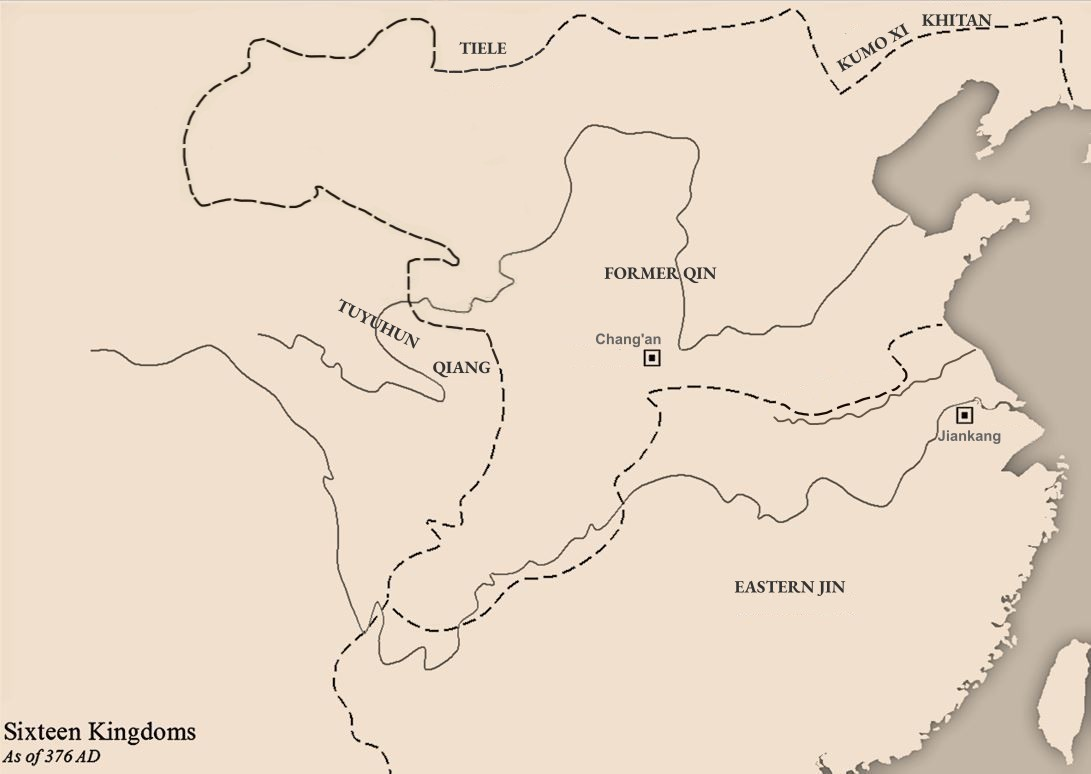
376 AD

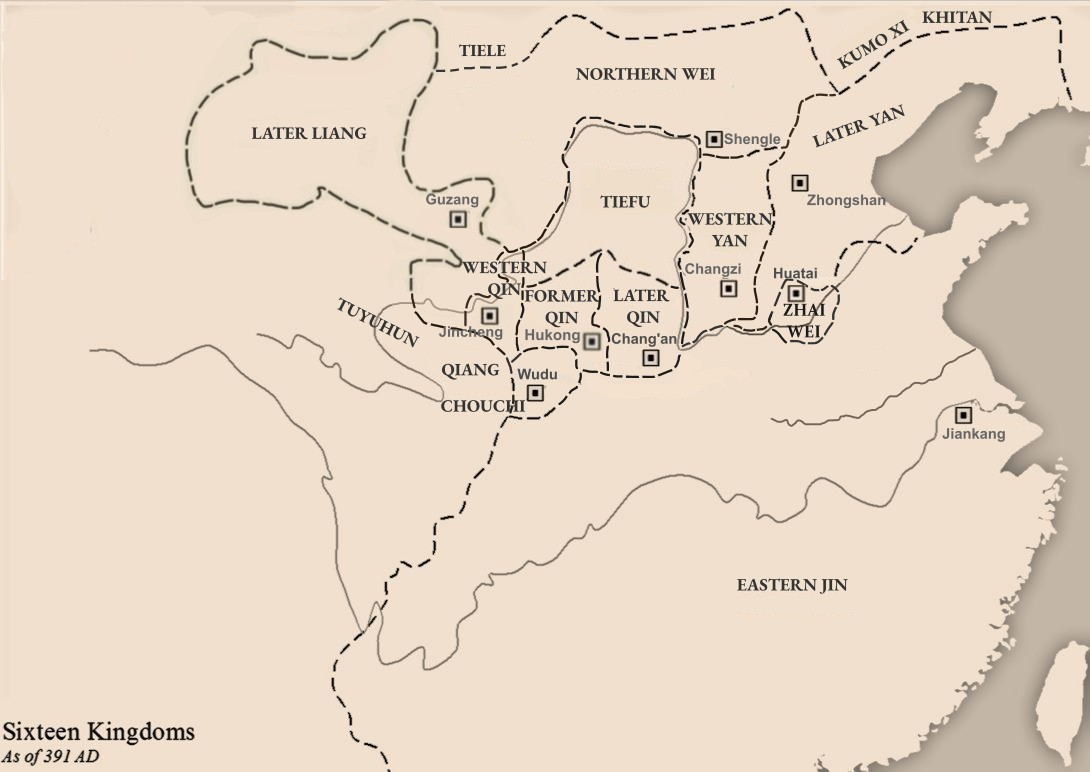
391 AD

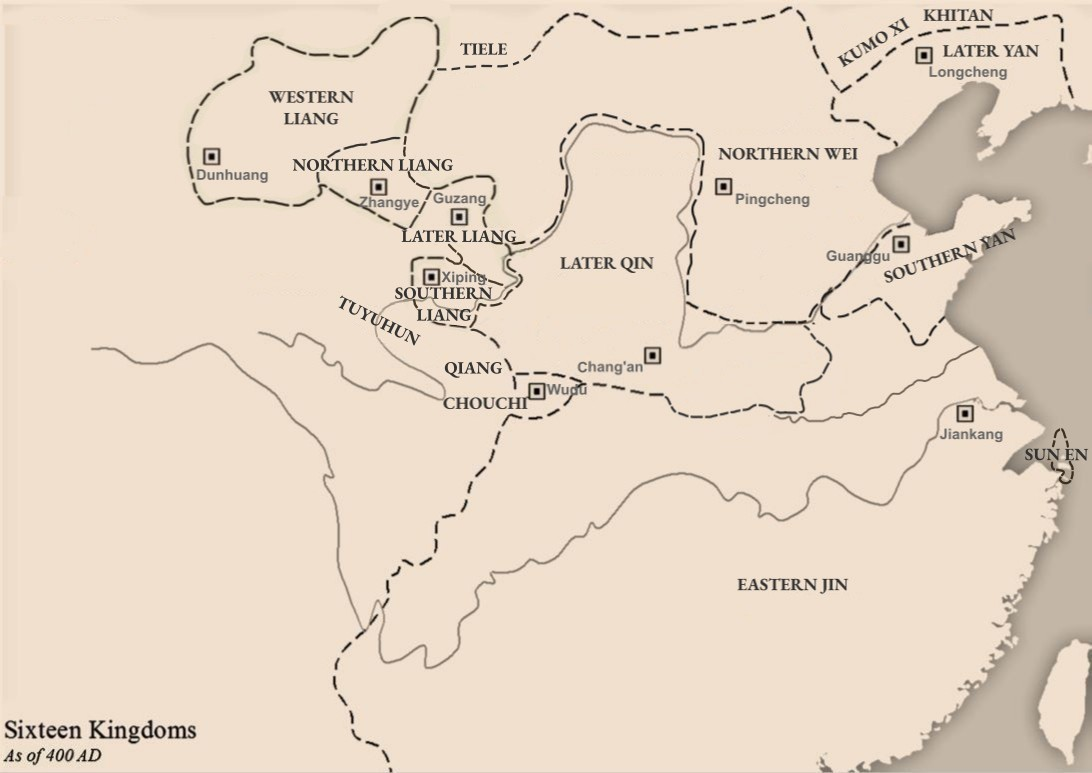
400 AD

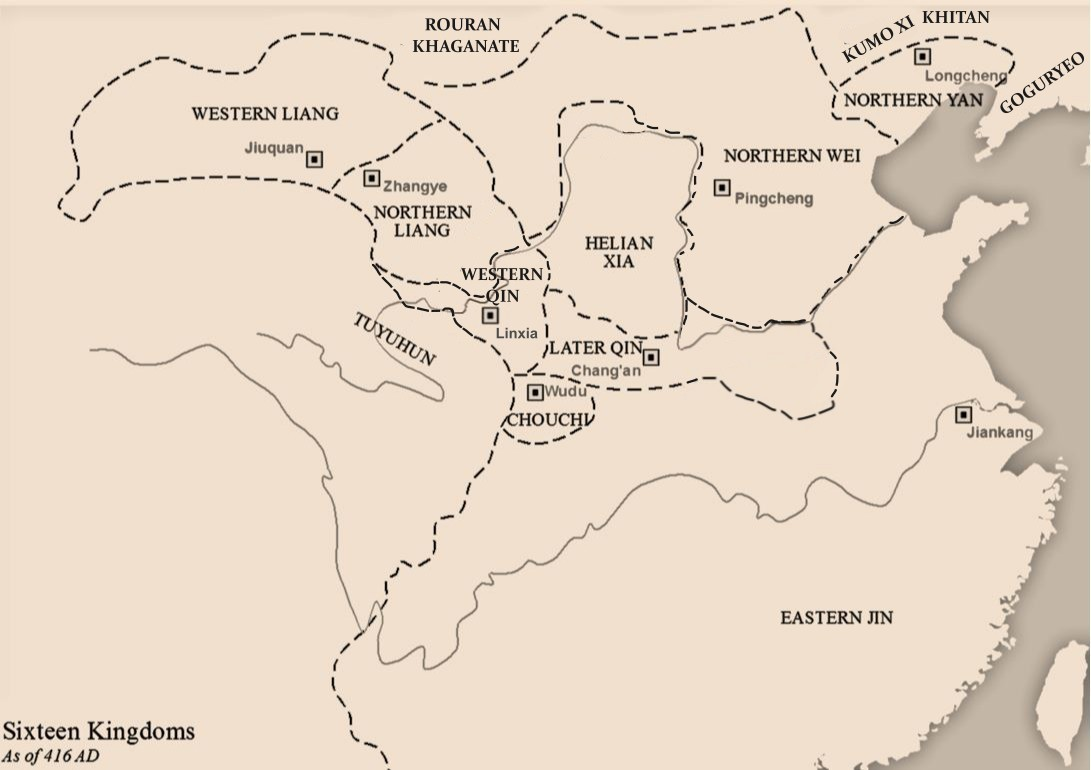
416 AD

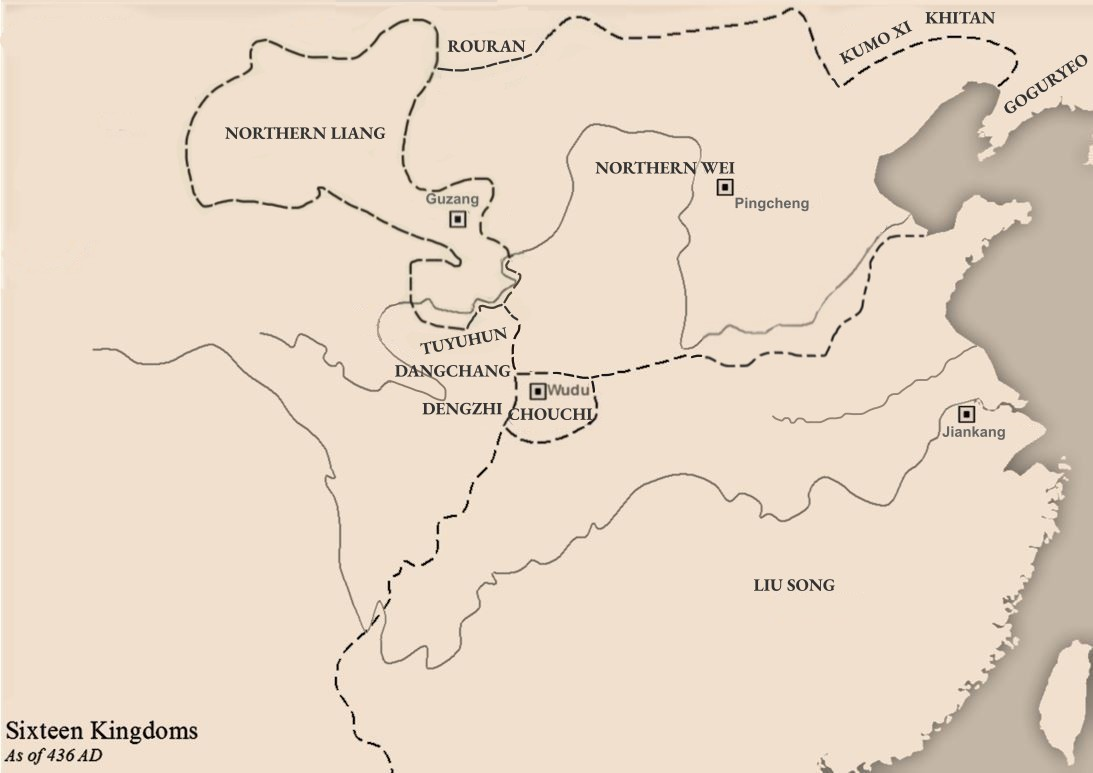
436 AD

=== Chouchi (296–371, 385–506) ===
Chouchi was a Di kingdom founded by Yang Maosou in 296. It was conquered by Former Qin in 371 and revived in 385. It was finally conquered by Northern Wei in 506.

=== Han-Zhao/Former Zhao (304–329) ===
Han-Zhao was a Xiongnu kingdom founded by Liu Yuan in 304. At this point in time the Xiongnu were no longer nomadic, but a sedentary people focused on stockbreeding and agriculture, tending towards sinicization.

Liu Yuan was the son of Liu Bao, one of the Southern Xiongnu chieftains settled in Taiyuan Commandery during the Three Kingdoms period. He studied in Luoyang as a youth and was both literate and fond of studying. However his position at court remained that of a subordinate barbarian and he chafed at this disgrace. When Sima Ying sent Liu Yuan to raise an army for him, he took the opportunity to proclaim himself "King of Han" and made a bid for the imperial throne as a legitimate successor to the Han dynasty.

After failing to take Taiyuan, Liu Yuan moved south to gather support from bandits and other barbarian peoples, notably the former slave Shi Le, hailing from the Jie tribes. With his bolstered army, Liu Yuan defeated the Jin forces and plundered his way to Luoyang in 309. Liu Yuan did not live to see the fall of the capital and died of illness on 29 August, 310.

Liu Yuan's eldest son, Liu He, ruled for only seven days before he was toppled by his younger brother, Liu Cong. The assault on Luoyang continued.

Realizing that defending the city was hopeless, Sima Yue fled with 40,000 men on 22 December, 310. He died on 23 April, 311. Sima Yue's army continued marching east, hoping to give their master a coastal burial. However before they were able to reach the coast, they were overtaken by Shi Le's cavalry and surrounded. The barbarian horse archers rained down arrows on them, causing a stampede. In the end, none survived.

Back at Luoyang, the Han army broke through the gates in the southern wall, capturing the city. Emperor Huai of Jin was taken prisoner and the city burnt to the ground. He would die in confinement in 313.

When Chang'an fell to the Han general Liu Yao in 316, Emperor Min of Jin was also captured, suffering the same fate as his predecessor.

Liu Cong died in 318. His son and heir, Liu Can, was murdered by an official, Jin Zhun. The throne went to Liu Yao, an orphan raised by Liu Yuan. Liu Yao relocated the capital from Pingyang to Chang'an and renamed the dynasty from Han to Zhao. In the northeast, Shi Le also proclaimed himself King of Zhao, the kingdom which historians refer to as Later Zhao. In 328, Liu Yao attacked Shi Le's holdings in Pingyang and took it after a siege lasting 100 days. Judging that Liu Yao's forces had been sufficiently weakened, Shi Led an army of 27,000 cavalry and 60,000 foot soldiers against him. Liu Yao was completely defeated and in 329, Shi Le's army marched into Han-Zhao and annexed it.

=== Cheng-Han (304–347) ===
Cheng-Han was a Ba Di kingdom founded by Li Xiong in 304. He proclaimed himself Emperor of Cheng in 306. It was conquered by Jin in 347.

=== Dai (304–376) ===
Dai was an independent Xianbei kingdom created by Tuoba Yilu. For his service against the Xiongnu from 304 to 314, the Jin dynasty ceded to him five counties.

Dai was conquered by Former Qin in 376.

=== Later Zhao (319–350) ===
Later Zhao was a Xiongnu/Jie kingdom founded by Shi Le in 319. The Jie were likely originally a Central Asian people and were described as having deep-set eyes, high nose bridges, and heavy facial hair. They also believed in Zoroastrianism.

Shi Le was a Xiongnu raised among the Jie tribes of southern Shanxi. At an early age he was seized by the Jin governor of Bing Province and sold into slavery. At some point Shi Le gained his freedom and became involved with a group of brigands who specialized in stealing horses from the imperial pastures. Together they formed a large following made up of escaped slaves and outlaws. During the War of the Eight Princes, they plundered south of the Yellow River, but suffered defeat at the hands of a Jin army. Shi Le then entered the service of Liu Yuan and became a major warlord in the northeast. When Liu Yuan died and Liu Yao moved the capital to Chang'an, proclaiming himself King of Zhao, Shi Le did the same in his territory. In 328, Liu Yao attacked Shi Le's holdings in Pingyang and took it after a siege lasting 100 days. Judging that Liu Yao's forces had been sufficiently weakened, Shi Le led an army of 27,000 cavalry and 60,000 foot soldiers against him. Liu Yao was completely defeated and in 329, Shi Le annexed Han-Zhao.

Shi Le died in 333 and was succeeded by his son Shi Hong, who was soon deposed by his cousin, Shi Hu, in 334. Shi Hu put to work enormous numbers of men on his palace complexes, dug up the tombs of former emperors for treasure, and was apparently addicted to his harem and hunting. At one point he had a quarrel with his heir apparent and killed him as well as his 26 children. They were buried in a single coffin.

Shi Hu died in 349 and was succeeded by Shi Zun. Shi Zun reigned for 33 days before his brother, Shi Jian, deposed him. Shi Jian reigned for 183 days before he was also deposed, by Shi Zhi, who lasted 103 days. Shi Zhi was ousted by Shi Min, an adopted nephew of Han Chinese origin. In reality, Shi Min had already been de facto ruler of Later Zhao since Shi Hu died. Shi Min then changed his name back to Ran Min, creating the kingdom of Wei in 350. Ran Min committed genocide on the Jie people, whose features made them physically distinct from the rest of the population. “The dead numbered more than 200,000. Corpses were piled outside the city walls, where they were all eaten by jackals, wolves, and wild dogs.”

=== Former Liang (320–376) ===
In the western Liang Province, Zhang Gui dutifully defended Jin territory against various Xianbei groups. When Zhang Gui's son, Zhang Shi, died in 320, Liang became an autonomous kingdom under the rule of the Zhang family. They remained nominal vassals of Jin until they were forced to become vassals of Zhao in 323. A few years later they proclaimed allegiance to Jin again. In 376, Former Qin conquered Former Liang.

=== Former Yan (337–370) ===
Former Yan was a Xianbei kingdom founded by Murong Huang in 337. It invaded Goguryeo in 342, destroyed the Yuwen tribe in 344, annexed Duan Qi in 356, took Xuchang in 364, and Luoyang in 365. It was conquered by Former Qin in 370.

=== Ran Wei (350–352) ===
Ran Min usurped the throne of Later Zhao in 350, creating Ran Wei. Ran Min committed genocide on the Jie people, whose features made them physically distinct from the rest of the population. “The dead numbered more than 200,000. Corpses were piled outside the city walls, where they were all eaten by jackals, wolves, and wild dogs.” The survivors who made it out sought help from the Xianbei kingdom of Former Yan to the northeast. Murong Jun led three armies south and defeated Ran Min in battle and annexed Ran Wei in 352.

=== Duan Qi (350–356) ===
Duan Qi was a Xianbei kingdom founded by Duan Kan in 350. It was conquered by Former Yan in 356.

=== Former Qin (351–394) ===
Former Qin was Di kingdom founded by Fu Jian in 351. Fu Jian's father Fu Hong was a leader under the service of Later Zhao. When Shi Hu died, Fu Hong led his people, 100,000 strong, westward. They defeated another group of Qiang exiles and captured Chang'an in 351. His son, Fu Jian, declared himself Emperor of Qin in 352. Jin forces tried to invade them in 354 but ultimately withdrew. Fu Jian died in 355 and was succeeded by his son Fu Sheng. Fu Sheng was deposed by Fu Jian (337–385) in 357.

Fu Jian subjugated the nomadic Qiang tribes and in 370, he sent his general Wang Meng to attack Former Yan. Wang Meng successfully defeated Former Yan in battle and annexed the kingdom. In 371 Fu Jian conquered Chouchi. In 373, Fu Jian seized Sichuan. Three years later, he annexed Former Liang and Dai. In 379, Xiangyang was conquered. By 381, Fu Jian had united all of North China under his control.

In 383, a Jin army attempted to take Xiangyang and was repelled by Qin relief force of 50,000. Fu Jian responded with a renewed all out attack on the south, mobilizing 270,000 cavalry and 600,000 infantry. Shouchun fell to the Qin vanguard (250,000) under Fu Rong. A Qin force 50,000 strong moved east to block a Jin army of 70,000. Disaster struck when a small Jin strike force of only 5,000 attacked the Qin position at night, dealing 15,000 casualties. The Jin army continued its march to Fei River, where it met the larger force under Fu Rong. Seeing that the situation had come to a stalemate at the river, the Jin commander offered Fu Rong to a fair battle if he would let them cross the river, and thus grant the Qin a much better position with their larger army. Fu Rong consented, but as he signaled to move back and make room from the Jin, the army fell into disarray, causing a panic stricken rout. Fu Rong himself was caught up in the commotion and killed in the stampede.

Qin general Lü Guang subjugated Qiuci.

The Former Qin empire collapsed under the weight of rebellion. In 384 Murong Chui reconquered his territory in the northeast, proclaiming himself emperor of what would be known as Later Yan in 386. Other members of the Murong family besieged Fu Jian in Chang'an from 384-385. He escaped only to be intercepted by and killed by Yao Chang. Yao proclaimed himself emperor of Later Qin in 386. In 384, Western Yan was founded by Murong Hong. In 385, Qifu Guoren founded Western Qin. Chouchi was also revived. Dai was revived in 386 in what would become known as Northern Wei. In 387, Lü Guang founded Later Liang.

In 384, Former Qin lost Xiangyang and in the next year, all their territory in Sichuan and south of the Yellow River.

Former Qin was annexed by Later Qin in 394.

=== Western Yan (384–394) ===
Western Yan was a Xianbei kingdom founded in 384 by Murong Hong. It took Chang'an in 385. It was conquered by Later Yan in 394.

=== Later Yan (384–409) ===
Later Yan was a Xianbei kingdom founded by Murong Chui in 384. It conquered Zhai Wei in 393 and Western Yan in 394. Northern Wei defeated Later Yan northeast of Liangcheng in 395 and took Bing Province from it in 396. Later Yan lost Zhongshan and Pingcheng to Northern Wei by 398. Gao Yun came to power in 407 as head of Northern Yan.

=== Later Qin (384–417) ===
Later Qin was a Qiang kingdom founded by Yao Chang in 384. Yao Chang killed Fu Jian in 385 and proclaimed himself emperor in 386. It conquered Former Qin in 394 and obtained submission from Western Qin in 400 and Later Liang in 403. It was conquered by Jin in 417.

=== Western Qin (385–400, 409–431) ===
Western Qin was a Xianbei kingdom founded in 385 by Qifu Guoren. It came under the control of Southern Liang and then Later Qin in 400. It was revived in 409, conquering Southern Liang in 414, and was ultimately itself conquered by Xia in 431.

=== Later Liang (387–403) ===
Later Liang was a Di kingdom founded in 387 by Lü Guang. It was conquered by Later Qin in 403.

=== Zhai Wei (388–393) ===
Zhai Wei was a Dingling kingdom founded by Zhai Liao in 388. It was conquered by Later Yan in 393.

=== Southern Liang (397–414) ===
Southern Liang was founded by Tufa Wugu in 397 and conquered by Western Qin in 414.

=== Northern Liang (397–439) ===
Northern Liang was founded by Duan Ye in 397. He was deposed by the Xiongnu Juqu Mengxun in 401. It conquered Western Liang in 421 and was itself conquered by Northern Wei in 439.

=== Southern Yan (398–410) ===
A Southern Yan kingdom was founded by Murong De in 400 after Later Yan was split in two by Northern Wei. It was conquered by Jin in 410.

=== Western Liang (400–421) ===
Western Liang was founded by Li Gao in 400 and conquered by Northern Liang in 421.

=== Xia (407–431) ===
Xia was a Xiongnu kingdom founded by Helian Bobo in 407. Helian took Chang'an in 418. Northern Wei attacked Xia in 426 and captured Chang'an, but Xia retook it in 428. Xia conquered Western Qin in 431, but was itself conquered by the Tuyuhun in the same year.

=== Northern Yan (407–436) ===
Northern Yan was a Korean-Chinese kingdom founded by Gao Yun in 407. Gao Yun was assassinated in 409 and replaced by Feng Ba. Northern Yan was conquered by Northern Wei in 436.

== Northern Wei ==
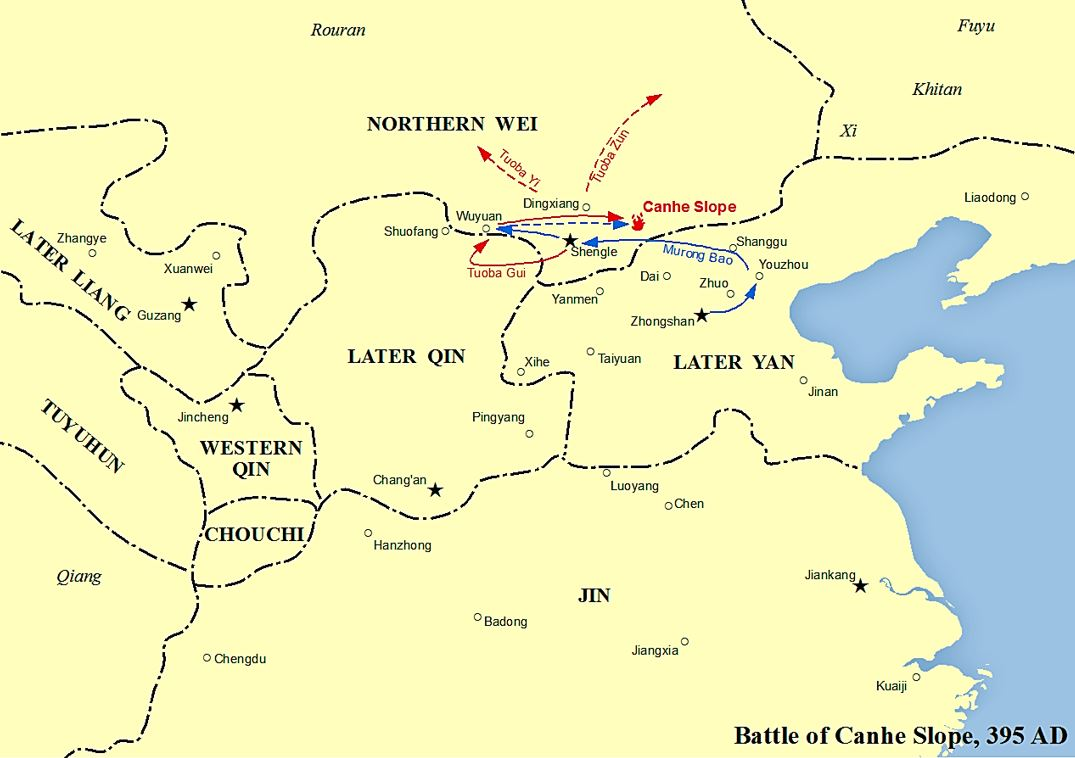
Battle of Canhe Slope, 395 AD.

Northern Wei, a successor state of Dai, was the first of the Northern and Southern dynasties. It was founded by Tuoba Gui, posthumously Emperor Daowu of Northern Wei, in 386.

From 388–9, he established dominion over the Kumo Xi, Jieru, and Tutulin in the east. From 390–1, he defeated the Gaoju, Yuange, Helan, Gexi, Getulin, Chinu, and Chufu north of the Yellow River. From 391–2, he defeated the Xiongnu south of the Yellow River.

In the summer of 395, the heir apparent of Later Yan, Murong Bao, attacked Northern Wei. Tuoba Gui chose not to confront him head on and fled west across the Yellow River, leaving the east undefended. When Murong Bao reached the east bank of the Yellow River, a series of protracted skirmished occurred, lasting until winter. At that point Murong Bao started to retreat, but Tuoba Gui overtook him with a column of cavalry at Canhe Slope, northwest of modern Horinger. The entire Yan army was taken by surprise and routed on 8 December 395. Murong Chui led another invasion into Northern Wei territory in 396 and defeated an army near Pingcheng, but the offensive came to an abrupt halt when he grew ill and died. The momentum reversed and Northern Wei armies captured Bing Province in the fall, Zhongshan in 397, and Ye city in 398.

Tuoba Gui died in 409 and was succeeded by his son, Tuoba Si, posthumously Emperor Mingyuan of Northern Wei. Tuoba Si was heavily involved in Chinese poetry and literature and lacked the martial drive of his predecessor. Under his reign, there were two campaigns against the Rouran to the north.

Tuoba Si died in 423 and was succeeded by his son Tuoba Tao, posthumously Emperor Taiwu of Northern Wei. Tuoba Tao was the polar opposite of his father. According to Sima Guang, the heir of Tuoba Si was courageous and stalwart, often leading the charge in assaulting heavily defended cities, and acted indifferently towards the sight of death. In 426 he attacked the kingdom of Xia, taking Chang'an and Tongwancheng in 427. However Chang'an was retaken the next year. In 430 Northern Wei took Luoyang from the Liu Song dynasty, conquered Northern Yan in 436, and Northern Liang in 439. Thus ended the Sixteen Kingdoms.

== Chronology ==
Chronology of the Sixteen Kingdoms with Ethnicity of Founders
Xianbei Xiongnu Jie Di Qiang Dingling Han Chinese
303	Jin Dynasty's rule over northern China and Sichuan begins to break down in 304	WESTERN; JIN DYNASTY*; 266-317
304	Cheng-Han; 304-47	Han-Zhao; 304-29
314
315	Dai*; 315-76
317
318	Former Liang; 318-76	EASTERN; JIN DYNASTY*; 318-420
319	Later Zhao; 319-51
329
330
337	Former Yan; 337-70
347
350	Ran Wei*; 350-52
351	Former Qin; 351-94
352
353
370
376
377	From 376 to 383, Former Qin briefly unites northern China
384	NORTHERN; WEI DYNASTY*; 386-534	Later Qin; 384-417	Western Yan*; 384-94	Later Yan; 384-409
385	Western Qin; 385-400
386	Later Liang; 386-403
388	Zhai Wei*; 388-92
392
394
397	Southern Liang; 397-414	Northern Liang; 397-439
398	Southern Yan; 398-410
400	Western Liang; 400-21
403
404
407	Xia; 407-31
409	Western Qin resurrected 409-31	Northern Yan; 409-36
410
414
417
420	LIU; SONG DYNASTY*; 420-79
421
431
436
439
440	In 439, the Northern Wei reunites northern China
asterisk (*) denotes kingdoms not counted among the sixteen in the Spring and Autumn Annals of the Sixteen Kingdoms

== See also ==
- Timeline of the Jin dynasty (266–420) and the Sixteen Kingdoms (304–439)

== Bibliography ==
- de Crespigny, Rafe (2010), Imperial Warlord, Brill
- Graff, David A. (2001), Medieval Chinese Warfare, 300-900, Routledge
- Graff, David A. (2002), A Military History of China, Boulder, Colorado, and Oxford, England: Westview Press, ISBN 0813337364
- Peers, C.J. (2006), Soldiers of the Dragon: Chinese Armies 1500 BC - AD 1840, Osprey Publishing Ltd
- Shin, Michael D. (2014), Korean History in Maps, Cambridge University Press
- Taylor, K.W. (2013), A History of the Vietnamese, Cambridge University Press
- Twitchett, Denis (2008), The Cambridge History of China: Volume 1, Cambridge University Press
- Xiong, Victor Cunrui (2009), Historical Dictionary of Medieval China, United States of America: Scarecrow Press, Inc., ISBN 978-0810860537
