= Zhang Guang =

Chinese military general (259–313)

- 張光

Inspector of Liang province (梁州刺史)
- In office 308 – 313
- Monarch: Emperor Min of Jin

Personal details
- Born: 259 Hengnan County, Hubei
- Died: 313 Hanzhong, Shaanxi
- Children: Zhang Mengchang; Zhang Yuan; Zhang Mai
- Courtesy name: Jingwu (景武)

Zhang Guang (259 – c.October 313), courtesy name Jingwu, was a military general of the Jin dynasty (266–420). He was involved in several significant military campaigns under the Jin, all of which he served with distinction and was eventually assigned to guard the Hanzhong region as the Inspector of Liang province (梁州; not to be confused with the Liang province (涼州) of modern-day Gansu which also existed at the time). Due to the fall of Western Jin, the Hanzhong was isolated from Jin control, and Zhang Guang was forced to govern the region with limited resources and pressure from the Cheng-Han dynasty, Chouchi and rebellious refugee groups. In the end, he was surrounded and died of illness while under siege.

== Early life and career ==
Zhang Guang was a native of Zhongwu County (鐘武; in present-day on Hengnan County, Hubei) in Jiangxia Commandery. He was described in records as eight chi tall with a beautiful face and a loud but pleasant voice. His family owned a private army for several generations. In his youth, he was a subordinate official to the administrator of Jiangxia and later became Officer of the Standard. He distinguished himself during the Conquest of Wu by Jin in 280, and was promoted to Colonel of the western region of Jiangxia. He was eventually transferred to Colonel of Beidi Commmandery.

=== Qi Wannian's Rebellion ===
In 291, the Prince of Zhao, Sima Lun was assigned to guard the Guanzhong region. He was arbitrary in his governance, rewarding and punishing as he pleased, incurring the anger of the local Di and Qiang tribes. As a result, a large-scale rebellion in Guanzhong broke out in 296. The administrator of Beidi, Zhang Sun (張損) and several other officials were killed in battle. Zhang Guang led over a hundred men to defend the north of Mount Malan (馬蘭山; in present-day Tongchuan, Shaanxi), where they were besieged by the rebels for more than 100 days.

Fortunately for Zhang Guang and his men, the Prince of Liang, Sima Rong sent his general, Suo Jing to rescue them. The soldiers all reportedly cried as they were saved, and after they returned to Chang'an, Sima Rong sent a report of Zhang Guang's deeds to the imperial court, comparing him to the Han dynasty general, Geng Gong and insisting that they reward him. Thus, Zhang Guang was promoted to Administrator of Xinping.

=== Assisting Liu Chen ===
In 304, the Prince of Changsha, Sima Ai was besieged in Luoyang by the Prince of Hejian, Sima Yong and the Prince of Chengdu, Sima Ying. During the siege, Sima Ai sent an edict to the Inspector of Yong province, Liu Chen and convinced him to attack Sima Yong's base in Chang'an. Zhang Guang was one of the administrators in the region who supported Liu Chen, but the latter entrusted most of his strategy to the Inspector of Qin province, Huangfu Zhong, a member of noble clans in the region. Huangfu looked down on Zhang Guang and refused to heed any of his suggestions. After Liu Chen was defeated, Zhang Guang was captured by Sima Yong, who questioned him about his strategy. With a stern expression, Zhang Guang replied, "It is precisely because Liu of Yongzhou refused to adopt my plans that you, Great King, are in this position." The prince was pleased with his answer and treated him with feasts. He then recommended Zhang Guang to become Guard General of the Right.

=== Chen Min's rebellion ===
In 305, Sima Yong was now at war with the Prince of Donghai, Sima Yue. At the same time, the Jin general, Chen Min rebelled by occupying the Jiangnan region south of the Yangzi River and planned to invade Jing province. Yong appointed Zhang Guang as the administrator of Shunyang and promoted him to General of Mound and River before sending him with 5,000 infantry and cavalry units to campaign against Chen Min in Jing. The Inspector of Jing, Liu Hong respected Zhang Guang and even referred to him as a "talent of southern Chu".

Liu Hong's general, Tao Kan led the Jin forces to confront Chen Min's general, Qian Duan (錢端) at Zhangqi (長岐; in present-day Jiangxia District, Hubei). Just as they were about to fight, the commander of the infantry, Pi Chu (皮初) ordered Zhang Guang to set an ambush and wait for the right moment. Meanwhile, the commander of the navy, Miao Guang (苗光) hid his boats along the Mian river (沔水). After Pi Chu and the others began fighting, Zhang Guang led his forces to join in the attack, and the rebels were defeated both on land and water. Chen Min's invasion was thus repelled.

Liu Hong was rooting for Sima Yue to win the civil war, so the administrator of Nanyang, Wei Zhan (衞展) pointed out to him that Zhang Guang was a confidant of Sima Yong, and that he should execute him to show his allegiance. However, Liu Hong refused, believing that it was dishonourable to endanger another person's life to save his own. Instead, he sent a petition to the court requesting that they further promote Zhang Guang.

== As Inspector of Liang province ==
=== Reclaiming Hanzhong ===
In 308, Zhang Guang was appointed Lumber Office General and Inspector of Liang province. Prior to his appointment, Deng Ding (鄧定) and 2,000 other refugees from Qin province fled to the Hanzhong region and occupied Chenggu, where they used it as a base to plunder the surrounding area. The previous Inspector of Liang, Zhang Yin (張殷) had sent the administrator of Baxi, Zhang Yan (張燕) to attack them, but Yan was bribed by Deng Ding into delaying his advance. While Zhang Yan was at standstill, Deng Ding contacted the emperor of Cheng-Han, Li Xiong in Sichuan, and the Cheng sent their forces to assist the refugees. Zhang Yan was defeated, causing Zhang Yin and the administrator of Hanzhong, Du Mengzhi (杜孟治) to abandon their posts.

Zhang Guang was unable to take up his post in Hanzhong, so stationed himself at Weixing (魏興; in present-day Ankang, Shaanxi) and planned with the local administrators to recover lost territory. Zhang Yan suggested that they must wait for a "hero" before they can reclaim the Hanzhong, but the administrator of Weixing, Du Zhengchong (杜正沖) blamed the fall of Hanzhong on him for accepting the bribe. Zhang Guang was furious and decided to have Zhang Yan executed as an example. He then organized his army and fought with the Cheng many times over the course of several years and finally recaptured Hanzhong in 311. He pacified the peasants in the region as they cultivated the land, and they all willingly submitted to him, thus allowing him to guard the Hanzhong.

=== War with Yang Hu and death ===
In 313, followers of the refugee leader, Wang Ru, flocked to Hanzhong from Xiangyang after their leader surrendered to Jin. Initially, Zhang Guang sent his troops to block them from entering, but his general, Jin Miao (晉邈), received bribes from the refugees and convinced Zhang Guang to allow them to settle in Chenggu. However, Jin Miao was still tempted by the treasure in the refugees' possession, so he slandered them to Zhang Guang by stating they were planning to rebel. Zhang Guang ordered Jin Miao to attack them, and he killed two of their leaders, Li Yun (李運) and Wang Jian (王建). Wang Jian's son-in-law, Yang Hu (楊虎) gathered his remaining followers to camp at the E river (厄水; in present-day Nanzheng District, Shaanxi) and attack Zhang Guang. In response, Zhang Guang sent his son, Zhang Mengchang (張孟萇) to campaign against the rebels, but was unable to win.

Both Zhang Guang and Yang Hu contacted Yang Maosou, ruler of the Di-led Chouchi polity, to send them reinforcements. Maosou opted to side with Zhang Guang, so he sent his son, Yang Nandi with cavalry to assist. However, Nandi had a grudge with Zhang Guang due to a prior incident where Zhang Guang had his adopted son whipped to death for illegally selling a slave. When Nandi arrived, his request for funds was rejected by Zhang Guang. Meanwhile, Yang Hu was bribing him with his treasure, so Nandi was adamant on switching sides. Zhang Guang sent an army to fight Yang Hu, with Zhang Mengcheng leading the front and Nandi leading the rear. Once the battle began, Nandi defected, and he and Yang Hu attacked Mengcheng from both sides, killing him and his younger brother, Zhang Yuan (張援).

Zhang Guang was forced to withdraw into his own city. In September or October 313, the stress of the situation had caused Zhang Guang to fall ill. His subordinates and followers urged him to retreat to Weixing, but Zhang Guang drew his sword and said, "I have accepted a great responsibility for my country. If I cannot defeat the bandits, then I will accept my death as if I were to become an immortal. Why should I retreat?" He then died not long after at the age of 55 (by East Asian reckoning), and his death was mourned by people near and far.

The people of Liang province entrusted his son, Zhang Mai (張邁) with provincial affairs, but he was later lost when fighting Yang Nandi's forces. Leadership then fell to his subordinate, Hu Zixu (胡子序), but he soon abandoned the city and allowed Hanzhong to fall to Yang Nandi and Yang Hu. The administrator of Nanping, Ying Zhan, suggested to the commander-in-chief, Wang Dun that they should honour Zhang Guang with a posthumous award, but Wang Dun ignored him.
