= Yang Nandi =

Chouchi ruler

Yang Nandi 楊難敵

Worthy King of the Left (左賢王)
- Reign: 317–334
- Predecessor: Yang Maosou
- Successor: Yang Yi

Personal details
- Born: Unknown Lueyang County, Shaanxi
- Died: 334 Cheng County, Gansu

Yang Nandi (died c. March 334) was a ruler of Chouchi during the Jin dynasty (266–420) and Sixteen Kingdoms period. He was the son of Yang Maosou who founded Chouchi in 296. During his reign, attacks on Chouchi by Former Zhao and Cheng-Han became more frequent. Nandi met these with mixed results, sometimes having to resort to vassalage, but was ultimately successful in preserving the survival of Chouchi.

== Early life and career ==
Nandi was the son of Yang Maosou, a Di chieftain from Qingshui County in Lueyang Commandery (略陽郡; in modern Tianshui, Gansu), who in 296, led his followers to Chouchi and declared independence during Qi Wannian's rebellion in Qinzhou and Yongzhou.

In an unspecified year, Nandi sent his adopted son to Liangzhou for a business trip. However, he was caught and executed by the provincial inspector, Zhang Guang (張光) when it was discovered that he had illegally sold a slave. Nandi was angry when he heard of his son's death and bore a grudge against Zhang Guang.

By 313, Zhang Guang was at war with a rebel named Yang Hu (楊虎). Both sides called for Chouchi to aid them and Maosou chose to support Zhang Guang in their conflict. Nandi was sent to assist Zhang Guang but due to their bad history and Zhang's refusal to grant him funds, Nandi was not eager to help him. Meanwhile, Yang Hu decided to win over Nandi with bribes and also told him that Zhang Guang possessed innumerous amount of treasure for Nandi to take if he were to fight him. In the end, Nandi agreed to join Yang Hu but waited to catch Zhang Guang off guard.

Zhang Guang and Yang Hu's armies met with one another later that year. Zhang Guang had his son Zhang Mengchang (張孟萇) lead the front while Nandi defended the rear. As the two sides fought, Nandi attacked Mengchang from behind. Nandi and Yang Hu routed Zhang Guang's army and killed Zhang Mengchang. Zhang Guang retreated into Hanzhong, where he died shortly after and was succeeded by his son Zhang Mai (張邁). However, in a later battle, Zhang Mai went missing and was replaced by his subordinate Hu Zixu (胡子序).

Nandi and Yang Hu pressed on into Hanzhong, causing Hu Zixu to abandon the city. The attackers dug up Zhang Guang's grave and had his corpse burnt. Nandi then took Zhang Guang's dancers and instrument before appointing himself the new Inspector of Liangzhou. In 314, Yang Hu plundered the region and fled to Cheng-Han. Around the same time, the people of Liangzhou rose up against Nandi and ousted him back to Chouchi before surrendering their territory over to Cheng-Han.

== Reign ==
Yang Maosou died in 318 and Nandi would take his throne. Upon ascending the throne, Nandi chose to split command over the state between him and his younger brother, Yang Jiantou (楊堅頭). Nandi became the Worthy King of the Left and based in Xiabian (下辯; northwest of present-day Cheng County, Gansu) while Jiantou became Worthy King of the Right and based in Hechi (河池, in modern Baoji, Shaanxi).

In 322, Former Zhao invaded Chouchi. The Zhao emperor, Liu Yao, personally led the army to conquer him. Nandi brought his troops out to attack the invading army but was defeated, so he retreated to his defenses. Many of the Di and Qiang tribes in Chouchi began to surrender to Liu Yao, and Liu had them relocated to Chang'an, then capital of the Former Zhao. As Liu Yao marched into Chouchi, a plague struck his army and Liu Yao himself had caught a disease. Liu Yao wanted to retreat but was worried that Nandi would attack from behind. Instead, he sent an envoy in the form of Wang Guang (王獷) to negotiate with Nandi. After lengthy discussions regarding his position, Nandi was convinced by the envoy to become a vassal to Zhao. For his submission, Nandi was showered with new offices including that of the Prince of Wudu.

Chouchi's vassalage would barely last a year, however. Capitalizing his victory over Chen An in Qinzhou in 323, Liu Yao invaded Former Liang and Chouchi to keep up with his momentum. Liang submitted to Zhao's authority leaving Chouchi the last of Zhao's western rivals. Nandi and Jiantou fled to Cheng-Han through Hanzhong. The Zhao general Liu Hou (劉厚) pursued them and captured a number of their followers. Zhao occupied Chouchi and had Tian Song (田崧) to serve as the Inspector of Yizhou. Nandi surrendered to Cheng-Han and even sent hostages but managed to bribe the Han general and nephew to the emperor Li Xiong, Li Zhi (李稚) to not send him to the Cheng capital, Chengdu.

When the Zhao forces withdrew, Nandi occupied Chouchi and betrayed Cheng-Han. Li Zhi regretted his miscalculation and begged Li Xiong to have him lead a campaign against Nandi. Despite objections from minister, Li Xiong sent Li Zhi on his way together with Zhi's brothers Li Han (李琀), Li Shou (李壽) and Li Wu (李玝) to subdue him. In the campaign, Li Han and Li Wu were blocked by Nandi's soldiers while Li Zhi and Li Shou marched too deep into Chouchi until they reached Xiabian. Li Zhi and Li Shou were encircled and killed by Nandi's troops while their armies were nearly decimated, causing Cheng-Han to retreat.

Back when Nandi recaptured Chouchi, he captured Tian Song along with it. In 325, Nandi demanded him to pay respect to him but instead, Tian Song told him "You Di cur! How can a border commander appointed by the Son of Heaven bow down before a bandit?" Nandi attempted to calmed him down but Tian Song only grew more aggressively. After insulting him one last time, Tian Song grabbed a sword and plunged at him. Nandi escaped with no injury and had Tian Song ordered to be executed.

For the next few years, Nandi continued to face invasion from his neighbours. In 327, the Zhao general Liu Lang (劉朗) attacked Chouchi but only captured very few territory before retreating. In 331, it was Cheng-Han that attacked Chouchi. This time, Cheng-Han managed to get Nandi to submit after capturing Yinping (陰平; present-day Wen County, Gansu) and Wudu. Nandi died in 334, and was succeeded by his son Yang Yi.
