= Yang Wendu =

King of Chouchi, died 477

Yang Wendu (Chinese: 楊文度; died 477) was a ruler of Chouchi during the Northern and Southern dynasties period. He was the last King of Wudu before Chouchi was split into Wuxing and Yinping, although the rulers of Wuxing continued to use the title until 492. He can also be seen as the first ruler of Wuxing, as after succeeding his distant-cousin, Yang Sengsi to the throne, Wendu proclaimed himself King of Wuxing and would only change his title to King of Wudu later.

Wendu came to power some time between 467 and 473. He initially sent envoys to the Northern Wei, but later betrayed them in favour of Liu Song. Song bestowed Wendu numerous offices, all whilst he continued hostilities with Wei. He attacked Wei in 473, but was repelled. He attacked Wei again in 477, but Wei in response started a campaign to defeat him. Wendu was killed and his head was sent to Pingcheng. After his defeat, Wei installed his cousin, Yang Guangxiang, as the Duke of Yinping (陰平; present-day Wen County, Gansu). Meanwhile, Wendu's brother, Yang Wenhong made peace with Wei and inherited his title, but would shift his base to Wuxing (武興縣; present-day Lueyang County, Shaanxi).
