= Yang Maosou =

Chouchi founding ruler

Ruler of Chouchi
- Reign: 296–317
- Successor: Yang Nandi
- Born: Unknown
- Died: 317
- Issue: Yang Nandi; Yang Jiantou
Full name
- Family name: Yang (楊; yáng); Given name: Maosou (茂搜; màosōu)
Regnal name
- Worthy Prince of the Right (右賢王, 296–?); Worthy Prince of the Left (左賢王, ?–317)
- Dynasty: Chouchi
- Father: Yang Feilong (adoptive)
- Mother: Lady Linghu (biological)

Yang Maosou (died 317), was the founding ruler of the Di-led Chouchi state during the Sixteen Kingdoms period of China. He is also known as Yang Wusou in some records.

== Background ==
Yang Maosou was the nephew of the Di chieftain, Yang Feilong. Their ancestors initially lived in Qingshui County, Lüeyang Commandery (略陽郡; in modern Tianshui, Gansu), but during the reign of Yang Ju (楊駒) in the early 3rd century, they moved to the Chouchi region. When Yang Feilong came to power, his forces grew in strength, and they later returned to Lüeyang.

Feilong was unable to conceive a son, so he adopted the son of his sister, Lady Linghu (令狐氏). He then changed his adopted son's name to Yang Maosou. When Feilong died in 296, Maosou succeeded him as the new chief.

== Reign ==
That same year, a Di chieftain, Qi Wannian, led a tribal rebellion against Jin. The rebellion coincided with famines and devastated the Guanzhong region, creating many refugees in search of food. In c.January 297, Yang Maosou led around 4,000 families to resettle in Chouchi and escape the confusion. He declared himself General Who Upholds the State and Worthy Prince of the Right, and soon, other refugees also began to join him. Maosou welcomed them with open arms and allowed them to leave if they wanted to, providing them with supplies to protect and sustain themselves on the way out.

Later, Emperor Min of Jin legitimized Maosou's authority by appointing him General of Agile Cavalry and Worthy Prince of the Left. Maosou's son, Yang Nandi, was also appointed General Who Attacks the South by the Prince of Nanyang, Sima Bao. Later on, Maosou sent tributes and became a vassal to the neighbouring Ba Di state of Cheng-Han.

In 313, Jin's Inspector of Liang, Zhang Guang, campaigned against the refugee rebel leader, Yang Hu (楊虎). Both sides approached Yang Maosou to form an alliance, and Maosou decided to support Zhang Guang. He sent Yang Nandi to aid Jin, but Nandi betrayed Zhang Guang and joined forces with Yang Hu instead. Nandi defeated Zhang Guang and briefly controlled Hanzhong before being ousted back to Chouchi by a local revolt in 314.

Yang Maosou died in 317. Yang Nandi, being Maosou's eldest son, succeeded him, but decided to jointly rule Chouchi with his brother, Yang Jiantou (楊堅頭).

== Sources ==
- Shen, Yue (493). Book of Song (Song Shu).
- Wei, Shou (554). Book of Wei (Wei Shu).
- Sima, Guang (1084). Zizhi Tongjian.
- Kleeman, Terry (1998). Great Perfection. University of Hawaii Press. ISBN 9780824818005.
