= Chouchi =

Polity in ancient China ruled by the Di people

Chouchi 仇池
- 296–443 (580)
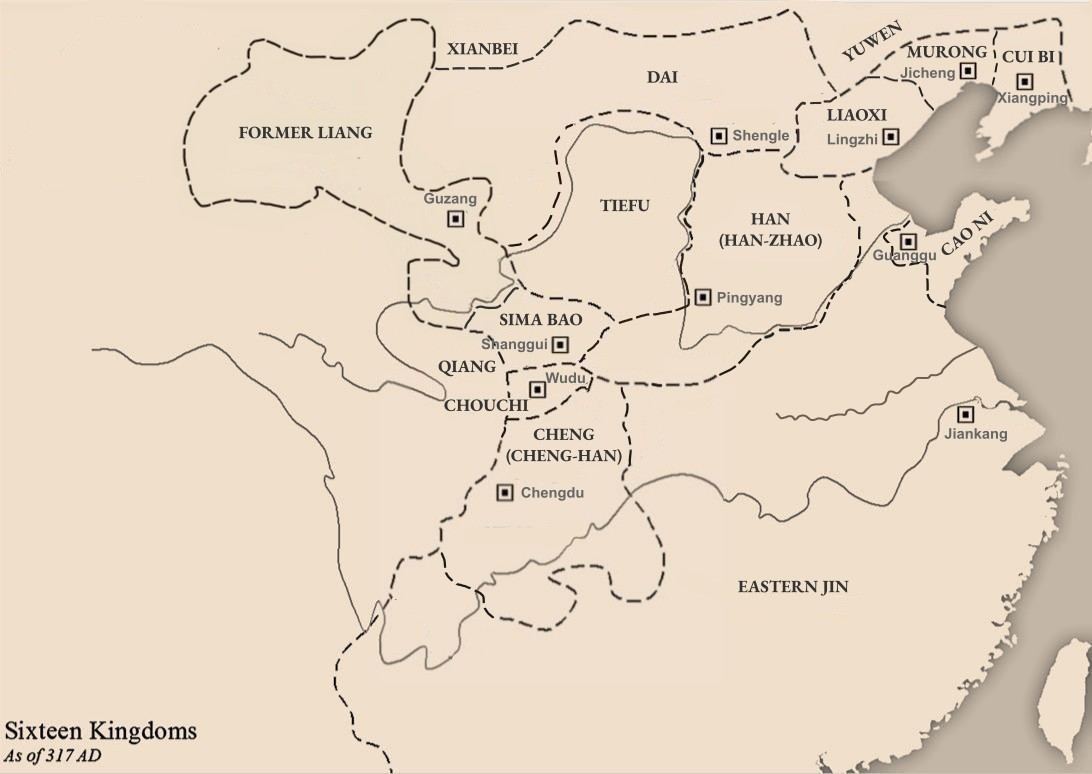
- The kingdom of Chouchi in the western China
- Status: Kingdom
- Capital: Chouchi (Qiuchi 仇池), Wudu
- Government: Monarchy
- King
- Historical era: 3rd - 6th century
  - Established: 296
  - Conquered by Former Qin: 371
  - Chouchi restored as Later Chouchi: 385
  - Conquered by Liu Song: 442
  - Disestablished: 443 (580)
  - Restored as Wudu, Wuxing and Yinping kingdoms: 448 - 580
Preceded by
Jin dynasty (266–420)
Succeeded by
Former Qin
Liu Song
Northern Zhou
- Today part of: China

Chouchi (Chinese: 仇池; pinyin: Chóuchí), or Qiuchi (pinyin: Qiúchí), was a polity in China ruled by the Yang clan of Di ethnicity in modern-day Gansu Province. Its existence spanned both the Sixteen Kingdoms and Northern and Southern dynasties periods, but it is not listed among one of these regimes in historiography.

== History ==
The Yang clan were initially the leaders of a prominent Di tribe in Qingshui County, Lüeyang Commandery (略陽郡; in modern Tianshui, Gansu) known as the Qingshui Di (清水氐). At the beginning of the 3rd century, Yang Teng (楊騰) led the tribe to migrate to Mount Chouchi in present-day Longnan, Gansu at the upper course of the Han River. His successors, (楊駒) and Yang Qianwan (楊千萬) paid tribute to the emperors of the Cao Wei Dynasty and were rewarded with the title of prince (wáng 王). According to Commentary on the Water Classic, at the top of Mount Chouchi were flat fields measuring around a hundred acres. Hence, the people of Chouchi were also known as the Baiqing Di (百頃氐; Hundred Acres Di).

Yang Feilong (楊飛龍) briefly shifted the center of the Chouchi realm back to Lüeyang, but his successor Yang Maosou later returned to Chouchi, where he reigned as an independent king at the beginning of the 4th century. The Chouchi troops often plundered territories in the Central Plains to the east and abducted people there, but the troops of Eastern Jin and Han-Zhao deprived the Chouchi empire of some of its people. In 322, Yang Nandi suffered a defeat at the hands of Han-Zhao and was degraded to prince of Wudu (武都王) and duke of Chouchi (仇池公). The following years were characterized by numerous internal struggles among the Yang clan and several usurpations of the throne. The rulers were not seen as mere regional inspectors (cishi 刺史) or governors (taishou 太守) of their region under the government of Jin.

In 371 Fu Jian, ruler of Former Qin, attacked Chouchi, captured the ruler Yang Cuan (楊篡) and ended the period of Former Chouchi.

Yang Ding, a great-great-grandson of Yang Maosou, and a son-in-law of Fu Jian, resurrected the Chouchi kingdom in 385, with the capital at Licheng (歷城). His younger brother Yang Sheng (楊盛) was able to conquer the region of Liangzhou (梁州) at the upper course of the Han River, and declared himself governor for the Jin Dynasty. Efforts to occupy the territory of modern Sichuan failed, but Chouchi controlled a large part of the modern provinces of Gansu (east) and Shaanxi (south).

After 443, the lords of Chouchi were only puppet rulers controlled by the Northern and Southern dynasties. Historians talk of the five realms of Chouchi (Chouchi wuguo 仇池五國): Former and Later Chouchi (Qianchouchi 前仇池, Houchouchi 後仇池), Wudu (武都), Yinping (陰平), and Wuxing (武興). Former Chouchi lasted between 296 and 371 while Later Chouchi lasted between 385 and 443. In 443, the Northern Wei conquered Chouchi, but was restored by Yang Wende that same year, beginning the Wudu period, although it could also be seen as a continuation of Later Chouchi. After the death of Yang Wendu in 477, the realm split into Yinping and Wuxing. Wuxing Kingdom was conquered by the Western Wei in 552 and Yinping Kingdom was conquered in 580 by Yang Jian (who later founded the Sui dynasty).

== Rulers ==
Chieftains, dukes and kings of Chouchi, Wudu, Wuxing and Yinping (296–mid 6th century)
Posthumous Names	Common names in Chinese characters	Durations of reigns or in office	Era names
Former Chouchi (296–371)
	Yáng Màosōu (楊茂搜)	296–317	
	Yáng Nándí (楊難敵)	317–334	
	Yáng Yì (楊毅)	334–337	
	Yáng Chū (楊初)	337–355	
	Yáng Guó (楊國)	355–356	
	Yáng Jùn (楊俊)	356–360	
	Yáng Shì (楊世)	360–370	
	Yáng Cuàn (楊篡)	370–371	
Later Chouchi (385–443)
Wǔ (武)	Yáng Dìng (楊定)	385–394	
Huìwén (惠文)	Yáng Shèng (楊盛)	394–425	
Xiàozhāo (孝昭)	Yáng Xuán (楊玄)	425–429	
	Yáng Bǎozōng (楊保宗)	429 and 443	
	Yáng Nándāng (楊難當)	429–441	Jiànyì (建義) 436–440
	Yáng Bǎochì (楊保熾)	442–443	
Kings of Wudu (443–477)
	Yáng Wéndé (楊文德)	443–454	
	Yáng Yuánhé (楊元和)	455–466	
	Yáng Sēngsì (楊僧嗣)	466–473	
	Yáng Wéndù (楊文度)	473–477	
Kings of Wuxing (477–506 and 534–555)
	Yáng Wénhóng (楊文弘)	477–482	
	Yáng Hòuqǐ (楊後起)	482–486	
Ān (安)	Yáng Jíshì (楊集始)	482–503	
	Yáng Shàoxiān (楊紹先)	503–506, 534–535	
	Yáng Zhìhuì (楊智慧)	535–545	
	Yáng Bìxié (楊辟邪)	545–553	
Note: Yang Zhihui and Yang Bixie could be the same person
Kings of Yinping (477–mid 6th century)
	Yáng Guǎngxiāng (楊廣香)	477–483?	
	Yáng Jiǒng (楊炯)	483–495	
	Yáng Chóngzǔ (楊崇祖)	495–before 502	
	Yáng Mèngsūn (楊孟孫)	before 502–511	
	Yáng Dìng (楊定)	511–?	
	Yáng Tàichì (楊太赤)	c. 516	
	Yáng Fǎshēn (楊法深)	520s–c. 553	

== See also ==
- Di
- Wu Hu
- List of past Chinese ethnic groups
