= 382 =

382 in various calendars
- Gregorian calendar: 382; CCCLXXXII
- Ab urbe condita: 1135
- Assyrian calendar: 5132
- Balinese saka calendar: 303–304
- Bengali calendar: −212 – −211
- Berber calendar: 1332
- Buddhist calendar: 926
- Burmese calendar: −256
- Byzantine calendar: 5890–5891
- Chinese calendar: 辛巳年 (Metal Snake); 3079 or 2872 — to — 壬午年 (Water Horse); 3080 or 2873
- Coptic calendar: 98–99
- Discordian calendar: 1548
- Ethiopian calendar: 374–375
- Hebrew calendar: 4142–4143
- Hindu calendars
- Vikram Samvat: 438–439
- Shaka Samvat: 303–304
- Kali Yuga: 3482–3483
- Holocene calendar: 10382
- Iranian calendar: 240 BP – 239 BP
- Islamic calendar: 247 BH – 246 BH
- Javanese calendar: 264–266
- Julian calendar: 382; CCCLXXXII
- Korean calendar: 2715
- Minguo calendar: 1530 before ROC 民前1530年
- Nanakshahi calendar: −1086
- Seleucid era: 693/694 AG
- Thai solar calendar: 924–925
- Tibetan calendar: ལྕགས་མོ་སྦྲུལ་ལོ་ (female Iron-Snake); 508 or 127 or −645 — to — ཆུ་ཕོ་རྟ་ལོ་ (male Water-Horse); 509 or 128 or −644

Year 382 (CCCLXXXII) was a common year starting on Saturday of the Julian calendar. At the time, it was known as the Year of the Consulship of Antonius and Syagrius (or, less frequently, year 1135 Ab urbe condita). The denomination 382 for this year has been used since the early medieval period, when the Anno Domini calendar era became the prevalent method in Europe for naming years.

== Events ==
=== By place ===
==== Roman Empire ====
- October 3 – Emperor Theodosius I commands his general Saturninus to conclude a peace treaty with the Visigoths, allowing them to settle south of the Danube. They are installed as foederati in Moesia and Thrace with the title of "Allies of the Roman People", in exchange for furnishing a contingent of auxiliary troops to defend the borders.
- Emperor Gratian refuses the divine attributes of the Imperial cult and removes the Altar of Victory from the Senate.

=== By topic ===
==== Religion ====
- The Council of Rome establishes Biblical canon in the Catholic Church. Pope Damasus I commissions a revision of the Vetus Latina, eventually resulting in the Vulgate of Jerome.
- The same council adopts Trinitarianism as doctrine, condemning Apollinarism. Theodosius I orders the death of members of the Manichaean monks.
- The first sermons declaring the virginity of Mary are given by John Chrysostom.

== Births ==
- Jin Andi, emperor of the Eastern Jin Dynasty (d. 419)
- Sima Yuanxian, regent during the Jin Dynasty (d. 402)

== Deaths ==
- Apollinaris the Younger, bishop of Laodicea in Syria.
