= 419th =

419th may refer to:

- 419th Fighter Wing, United States Air Force Reserve unit active with Tenth Air Force, based at Hill Air Force Base, Utah
- 419th Flight Test Squadron (419 FLTS), part of the 412th Test Wing based at Edwards Air Force Base, California
- 419th Night Fighter Squadron, inactive United States Air Force unit
- 419th Operations Group, operational component of the 419th Fighter Wing, stationed at Hill Air Force Base, Utah
- 419th Tactical Fighter Training Squadron, inactive United States Air Force unit

== See also ==
- 419 (number)
- 419 (disambiguation)
- 419, the year 419 (CDXIX) of the Julian calendar
- 419 BC
