= Syagrius (disambiguation) =

- Flavius Syagrius (consul 381), Roman consul in 381
- Afranius Syagrius, Roman consul in 382.
- Syagrius (430 – 486 or 487) Roman official of the Gallo-Roman enclave of Soissons after the collapse of Western Roman empire.
- Saint Syagrius of Autun (died 600), bishop of Autun
- Syagrius of Verona, a bishop of Verona c. 360.
- Syagrius (beetle), a genus of insects in the family Curculionidae
