= 419 (disambiguation) =

419 may refer to:

- 419, the year 419 C.E.
- 419 (number)
- Advance-fee scam, also known as the "419 scam", a form of fraud and a common scam
- Area code 419 for the northwestern part of Ohio
- Police radio code for "dead human body"
- UN M49 code for Latin America and the Caribbean
- es-419 ISO 639 code for Latin American Spanish
- 419 (novel), a 2012 novel by Will Ferguson
- The original title of the 2011 novel by Rule 34 by Charles Stross

== See also ==
- 419th (disambiguation)
