= Merobaudes (magister peditum) =

Roman army officer

Flavius Merobaudes (died 383 or 388) was a Roman army officer of Frankish origin. He was appointed magister peditum around 375, and consul twice in 377 and 383. Ancient sources record that he was put to death that year for his support of the imperial usurper Magnus Maximus, but an inscription records that he became consul a third time in 388.

== Biography ==
Merobaudes was an official of emperor Julian (r. 361–363). He was entrusted with the transportation of the corpse of the Emperor when Julian died during his military campaign against the Sasanids.

Around 375, Emperor Valentinian I appointed Merobaudes magister peditum. After Valentinian I's death in that same year, Merobaudes stated that he could control the army only if Valentinian's son, Valentinian II, was appointed Emperor. Valentinian II ruled together with his brother Gratian, and Merobaudes influenced both of them.

Merobaudes was twice consul, in 377 with Gratian and in 383 with Saturninus. This was a sign of great honour, since the holding of multiple consulates had been reserved for members of the imperial family since the reign of Constantine I. Merobaudes was likely a firm supporter of Count Romanus, the proconsul of Africa. Merobaudes supported Romanus against Count Theodosius in two court cases which ended with Romanus's acquittal and Theodosius's execution.

In 378 Gratian ordered Merobaudes to withdraw his troops eastwards to reinforce the Eastern Emperor Valens in his planned attack on the Goths, who had begun to revolt after relocating to Roman territory when displaced by invading Huns. Merobaudes decided to leave troops behind in Gaul, preventing a disaster when the Alemanni decided to invade after learning of the planned Roman withdrawal and leading to a massive victory for Gratian's army at Argentia, killing 30,000 Alemanni. However, this delay led to the death of Valens and the destruction of most of his eastern army at the Battle of Adrianople when Valens decided to attack without waiting for Gratian's reinforcement (possibly to avoid sharing the victory with his Western rival).

According to ancient sources, in 383 Merobaudes supported the usurper Magnus Maximus and was put to death by the Emperor. Modern historians, however, downplay Merobaudes' role in Maximus' usurpation. Even his death in 383 is in doubt, as an inscription mentions a third consulate of his in 388, even if a panegyric by Pacatus records his death, probably suicide. He was probably buried in Trier.

== Bibliography ==
- Martindale, John R.; Jones, A. H. M.; Morris, John, eds. (1971). The Prosopography of the Later Roman Empire: Volume I, AD 260–395. Cambridge: Cambridge University Press. ISBN 0-521-07233-6.
- Helmut Reimitz, "Merobaudes", Reallexikon der germanischen Altertumskunde, volume 19, 2001, p. 572f.

Preceded by Valens Augustus V Valentinianus junior Augustus	Roman consul 377 with Gratianus Augustus IV	Succeeded by Valens Augustus VI; Valentinianus junior Augustus II
Preceded by Claudius Antonius; Afranius Syagrius	Roman consul 383 with Flavius Saturninus	Succeeded by Flavius Richomeres; Flavius Clearchus
