= Antrustion =

Merovingian military role

An antrustion (Latin: antrustio, plural antrustiones) was a member of the bodyguard or military household of the Merovingian kings of the Franks. The bodyguard itself is called the trustis (French: truste), a Frankish word with a Latin ending, possibly signifying comfort, aid, fidelity, trust (compare Old High German trost). An alternative etymology relates it to proto-Germanic *druhtiz, warband, whence old high German truht and perhaps Slavonic druzhina.

Information about the antrustions is derived from one of the formulae of Marculfus and from various provisions of the Salic law. Anyone desiring to enter the antrustions had to present himself armed at the royal palace, and there, with his hands in those of the king, take a special oath or trustis and fidelitas, in addition to the oath of fidelity sworn by every subject at the king's accession. This done, he was considered to be in truste dominica and bound to provide the services this involved. In return for these, the antrustion enjoyed certain advantages, entitled to royal assistance and protection; his wergeld was three times that of an ordinary Frank; the slayer of a Frank was paid compensation of 200 solidi, that of an antrustion had to find 600. The antrustion was always of Frankish descent, and only in certain exceptional cases were Gallo-Romans admitted into the group. These Gallo-Romans then took the name of convivae regis, and the wergeld of 300 solidi was three times that of a homo romanus. The antrustions, belonging as they did to one body, had strictly defined responsibilities towards one another; e.g., one antrustion was forbidden to bear witness against another under penalty of 15 solidi compensation.

The antrustions seem to have played an important part at the time of Clovis. Apparently they formed the army that conquered the land, an army composed chiefly of Franks, with a few Gallo-Romans who had taken the side of Clovis. After the conquest, the role of the antrustions became less important. For each expedition, the king raised an army of citizens in which the Gallo-Romans mingled more and more with the Franks; they only kept one small permanent body which acted as their bodyguard (trustis dominica). Some members were assigned other tasks, such as that of forming garrisons in frontier towns. The institution seems to have disappeared during the anarchy with which the 8th century opened.

It has wrongly been held to be the origin of vassalage. Only the king had antrustions; while every lord could have vassals. The antrustions were a military institution; vassalage was a social institution with complicated origins.
