= Richomeres =

4th century Roman army officer

Magister militum Richomeres

Roman consul
- In office 384–384 Serving with Clearchus
- Preceded by: Merobaudes and Saturninus
- Succeeded by: Arcadius and Bauto

Personal details
- Born: Flavius Richomeres
- Died: 393
- Spouse: Ascyla
- Children: Theodemer
- Parent: Teutomer (father)
- Relatives: Arbogast (nephew)
- Occupation: Politician, soldier, senator

Military service
- Allegiance: Roman Empire
- Years of service: 377/378 – 393
- Rank: Magister militum
- Battles/wars: Battle of Adrianople

Flavius Richomeres or Richomer, Ricomer (died 393) was a Frank who lived in the late 4th century. He took service in the Roman army and made a career as comes, magister militum, and consul. He was an uncle of the general Arbogastes. He is possibly to be identified with the Richomeres who married Ascyla, whose son Theodemer later became king of the Franks.

== Life ==
Around the years 377/378, Richomeres was comes domesticorum of Emperor Gratian and was transferred from Gaul to Thracia, where he was involved in the Gothic wars of Emperor Valens. At Adrianople, he tried to persuade Valens to wait on Gratian for support. When the Gothic leader Fritigern demanded hostages to secure peace from the Romans, he volunteered and departed the Roman camp to bring the other hostages safely to Fritigern, but before he arrived, some elements of the two armies got out of control and engaged, starting the famous Battle of Adrianople. Richomeres ended up at a battlefield in complete chaos, but he saved himself by withdrawing and survived. However, Valens' army was largely destroyed and many officers fell, including Valens himself.

Around 383, he was General in the east (magister militum per orientem), and became consul in 384.

In 388, Theodosius I sent him together with his nephew Arbogastes and Promotus and Timasius against the usurper Magnus Maximus, who was defeated.

From the year 388, he served as supreme commander in the Eastern portion of the Empire (comes et magister utriusque militiae) until his death in 393. Richomeres was interested in literature, and was acquainted with rhetoricians, such as Libanius and Augustinus. He introduced the rhetorician Eugenius to his nephew Arbogastes. A few years later, Arbogastes seized power in the western portions of the Empire. After the death of Valentinian II, Arbogastes promoted Eugenius to be his Emperor, while he himself remained the leader and generalissimo. In 393, Theodosius I organised a campaign against Arbogastes, and Richomeres was asked to lead the cavalry against his nephew. On the way from the East to the West, he died before the battle took place. Arbogastes lost the battle and committed suicide with his own sword.

Political offices
Preceded by Merobaudes; Saturninus	Roman consul 384 with Clearchus	Succeeded by Arcadius; Bauto
