= Arborychoi =

Nation of northern Gaul

The Arborychoi (Note: Other spellings include Arboruchoi, Arborychi, Arborykhoi and Arborukhoi.) (Greek: Αρβόρυχοι) were a people mentioned by Procopius as living in Gaul in the 5th century AD. There is no consensus on who they were.

Procopius mentions the Arborychoi in his description of the land and peoples west of Gaul. Based on his description of their proximity to the Franks, it has been suggested that they would have "occupied the coast of what is today Belgium." Writing in the 550s, he probably got his information from a Frankish embassy. It forms part of a passage explaining the origins of the Franks and their power. It should probably be associated, insofar as his garbled account is historical, with the reigns of the Frankish kings Childeric I and Clovis I. The Arborychoi are described as having been soldiers of the Roman Empire. They are said to have changed their form of government, probably meaning that they came to recognize rulers other than the Roman emperors. They fought an inconclusive war with the Franks before allying and intermarrying with them, becoming one people. They were both Christians (i.e., Chalcedonians, not Arians) at this time, which situates it after the conversion of Clovis. In his own day, Procopius writes, the descendants of the Arborychoi still followed Roman customs and carried their old banners.

The name Arborychoi is usually regarded as a corruption of Latin Armorici or Armoricani. This identification was current as early as the 18th century, when it was questioned by Edward Gibbon on the basis of geography. Ernst Stein accepted it, but Ferdinand Lot argued that Procopius had garbled the Latin word aborigines (natives). Thomas Charles-Edwards notes that a confusion of b and m also occurs in the treatment of the Conomor by Procopius' contemporary, Gregory of Tours, who calls him Chonomoris and Chonoober. Edward James accepts the etymology, but points out that the term cannot refer to the people of Armorica (then being conquered by the Bretons) but only the Tractus Armoricanus, a Roman military region corresponding to Gaul north of the Loire and west of the Seine, an area inhabited by Gallo-Romans. In this sense, it may refer not to a people, but to the Roman army on the Loire.

Jean-Pierre Poly considers the identification of the Arborychoi with the Armoricani "unlikely if not impossible". He proposes that Arboruchoi is in fact a misspelling of Arboruchtoi and is cognate with the Boructuari of Bede. This name means "first" or "great" Bructeri (etymologically "ere-brought"). According to Maurits Gysseling, it is preserved in the early medieval place name Boroctra (Borchtergo). The presence of six Rhenish pagi with bant (banner) in the name may be a record of the long use of Roman banners noted by Procopius.

== Text of Procopius ==
. . . and this is where the Germans lived of old, a barbarous nation, not of much consequence in the beginning, who are now called Franks. Next to these lived the Arborychi, who, together with all the rest of Gaul, and, indeed, Spain also, were subjects of the Romans from of old. And beyond them toward the east were settled the Thuringian barbarians, Augustus, the first emperor, having given them this country. And the Burgundians lived not far from them toward the south, and the Suevi also lived beyond the Thuringians, and the Alamani, powerful nations. All these were settled there as independent peoples in earlier times. But as time went on, the Visigoths forced their way into the Roman empire and seized all Spain and the portion of Gaul lying beyond the Rhone River and made them subject and tributary to themselves. By that time it so happened that the Arborychi had become soldiers of the Romans. And the Germans, wishing to make this people subject to themselves, since their territory adjoined their own and they had changed the government under which they had lived from of old, began to plunder their land and, being eager to make war, marched against them with their whole people. But the Arborychi proved their valour and loyalty to the Romans and shewed themselves brave men in this war, and since the Germans were not able to overcome them by force, they wished to win them over and make the two peoples kin by intermarriage. This suggestion the Arborychi received not at all unwillingly; for both, as it happened, were Christians. And in this way they were united into one people, and came to have great power. Now other Roman soldiers, also, had been stationed at the frontiers of Gaul to serve as guards. And these soldiers, having no means of returning to Rome, and at the same time being unwilling to yield to their enemy who were Arians, gave themselves, together with their military standards and the land which they had long been guarding for the Romans, to the Arborychi and Germans; and they handed down to their offspring all the customs of their fathers, which were thus preserved, and this people has held them in sufficient reverence to guard them even up to my time. For even at the present day they are dearly recognized as belonging to the legions to which they were assigned when they served in ancient times, and they always carry their own standards when they enter battle, and always follow the customs of their fathers. And they preserve the dress of the Romans in every particular, even as regards their shoes.

== Sources ==
- Arrignon, Jean-Pierre [in French]; Duneau, Jean-François (1981). "La frontière chez deux auteurs byzantins: Procope de Césarée et Constantin VII Porphyrogénète". In Hélène Ahrweiler (ed.). Geographica Byzantina. Publications de la Sorbonne. pp. 17–30.
- Charles-Edwards, T. M. (2013). Wales and the Britons, 350–1064. Oxford University Press.
- Halsall, Guy (2007). Barbarian Migrations and the Roman West, 376–568. Cambridge University Press.
- James, Edward (1982). The Origins of France: From Clovis to the Capetians, 500–1000. Macmillan.
- James, Edward (2014). Europe's Barbarians, AD 200–600. Routledge.
- Poly, Jean-Pierre (1993). "La corde au cou: Les Francs, la France et la Loi salique". Publications de l'École Française de Rome (168): 287–320.
- Poly, Jean-Pierre (2016). "Freedom, Warriors' Bond, Legal Book: The Lex Salica Between Barbarian Custom and Roman Law". Clio et Thémis. 11: 1–25.
- Procopius (1919). History of the Wars. Vol. III, Books V and VI. Translated by H. B. Dewing. New York: G. P. Putnam's Sons.
