= Clearchus (consul) =

Roman politician

Clearchus (Greek: Κλέαρχος) was a Roman politician who was consul of the Roman Empire in 384 AD.

== Career ==
Born into a moderately successful family in the region of Thesprotia, as a boy Clearchus was taught by the philosopher and sophist Nicoles. Moving to Constantinople, in 356 or perhaps 357 he visited Antioch, and throughout this period (until 363) he was an associate of Themistius.

From 359 Clearchus held a number of unknown posts in Constantinople, and was promoted in 360 to a higher position. It is possible that he was appointed to the post of assessor during this period. His increasing political clout was demonstrated by his inclusion in the embassy from the Senate to Antioch to greet the new emperor Jovian after his accession.

From 363 to 366 AD, Clearchus was appointed Vicarius of Asia. In 364 he intervened to secure the acquittal of Alexander of Heliopolis, the former governor of Syria. In 365 he was asked to intervene in an incident at Perga concerning Metrophanes, the governor of Pamphylia. During the revolt of Procopius, he remained loyal to the emperor Valens, and risked his life in support of him. He criticised the Praetorian Prefect Salutius, accusing him of laziness in his response to the crisis. As a reward for his loyalty, Valens possibly appointed Clearchus as the proconsul of Asia. He held this post from 366 to 367 AD, during which he managed to remove Salutius from his post and secure the appointment of Auxonius in his place. He was also able to protect the philosopher Maximus of Ephesus, who had been convicted of illegally enriching himself, by releasing him and restoring his property.

Clearchus's next appointment was as Praefectus urbi of Constantinople in 372, which he held for a year. During his appointment Clearchus led the inauguration of the Aqueduct of Valens (373 AD), and he subsequently commissioned a Nymphaeum Maius in the Forum of Theodosius that was supplied with water from the aqueduct. He was appointed Urban Prefect of Constantinople for a second time, this time from 382 to 384 AD. As a reward for his services, Clearchus was made consul in 384. During his time as consul, Clearchus's influence appears to have receded and he held no further posts.

A pagan, Clearchus received regular correspondence from the sophist Libanius.

== Sources ==
- Lenski, Noel Emmanuel, Failure of Empire: Valens and the Roman State in the Fourth Century A.D. (2002).
- Martindale, John R.; Jones, A. H. M.; Morris, John, eds. (1971). The Prosopography of the Later Roman Empire: Volume I, AD 260–395. Cambridge: Cambridge University Press. ISBN 0-521-07233-6.
- Potter, David Stone, The Roman Empire at Bay: AD 180 - 395 (2004).

Political offices
Preceded by Merobaudes; Saturninus	Roman consul 384; With: Ricomer	Succeeded by Arcadius; Bauto
