= Alathar =

- Died: after 513 AD
- Allegiance: Eastern Roman Empire
- Branch: Byzantine army
- Service years: c. 513–515
- Rank: Magister militum per Thracias
- Conflicts: Vitalian's rebellion

Alathar (fl. 513) was an Eastern Roman magister militum of Hunnish descent.

== Biography ==
Alathar was appointed Magister militum per Thracias by Anastasius I Dicorus. He succeeded the deceased Cyrillus in this capacity. It is possible that he was appointed magister militium to attract the Huns in the army of rebel Vitalian to Anastasius' side.

Alathar was defeated by Vitalian during the latter's rebellion. He was described as a "Scythian", a term that at the time was used to indicate the Huns. J. B. Bury, Ernst Stein and Georges Tate read "Scythian" as meaning "Hun" in this case.

In Hun/Hungarian legends, Aladár is the son of Etele (Attila) and the German princess Kriemhild.
