= Flavius Julius Eucherius =

Flavius Julius Eucherius (d. after 395) was a Roman politician and member of the Theodosian Dynasty.

== Biography ==
He was the son of Flavius Honorius. His brother was Count Theodosius the Elder. Eucherius began his service under the reign of Emperor Julian, continued during the reign of Valentinian I. He enjoyed the support of Empress Justina. In 377 AD, Gratian appointed him to the fiscal office of Comes sacrarum largitonum.

In 379 AD, after the accession of his nephew Theodosius I to the Eastern Empire, his position at court was greatly strengthened. In 381 AD, Eucherius became consul together with Flavius Syagrius as his colleague.

In 393 AD, he appealed to the Praetorian Prefect of the East, Rufinus regarding the punishment for an insult by Lucian, the Comes Orientus. In 395 AD, he contributed to the overthrow of Rufinus by Flavius Stilicho. His further fate is unknown.

Political offices
Preceded by Gratian V Theodosius I	Consul of the Roman Empire; 381 with Flavius Syagrius	Succeeded by Afranius Syagrius; Claudius Antonius
