= Claudius Antonius =

Roman politician

Claudius Antonius (fl. 370–380s) was a Roman politician under the reigns of Valentinian I, Gratian and Theodosius I. He was appointed consul in AD 382 alongside Afranius Syagrius.

== Biography ==
Possibly of Spanish origin, Claudius Antonius was a career bureaucrat and a Christian. Around the year AD 370, he was the magister scrinii, one of the imperial secretaries, for the emperor Valentinian I. By AD 373, Antonius was serving as the quaestor sacri palatii, where his tasks included drafting imperial speeches for Valentinian for addressing the Senate. The death of Valentinian in 375 saw a purge of the bureaucracy by Gratian, but Antonius not only survived, but managed to prosper under the new administration. From AD 376 to 377, he was appointed the praetorian prefect of Gaul, and from 377 to 378 he was the praetorian prefect of Italy. During this period Antonius was a supporter of Ausonius, and was a key mover in the creation of a court alliance between the Gallo-Roman and Romano-Spanish aristocracy, which involved the rise of the general and future emperor, Theodosius. Antonius was responsible for implementing Gratian's school law of May 376 (subsidising the employment of grammarians and rhetoricians), as well as edicts which clarified the relationship between the civil and military judicial spheres in the prefecture of Gaul and solidifying the authority of the diocesan vicarius.

After his tenure as praetorian prefect, Antonius followed the emperor Theodosius I and moved himself to the eastern court at Constantinople, and in AD 383, he was appointed consul prior, with Afranius Syagrius as his colleague. Antonius’ accession to the consulship was owed to his marital ties to Theodosius I. It is speculated by Martindale et. al. that Antonius had a sister Maria, who was married to Theodosius’ brother, Honorius. Antonius wrote tragedies in his spare time, and received correspondence from Quintus Aurelius Symmachus, who praised him for his literary accomplishments, while Antonius promoted Symmachus' senatorial career. He also corresponded with Saint Ambrose, with whom he apparently enjoyed good relations.

== Sources ==
- CLRE – Roger S. Bagnall; Alan Cameron; Seth R. Schwartz & Klaas A. Worp (1987). Consuls of the Later Roman Empire. Oxford University Press. ISBN 1-55540-099-X.
- Martindale, John R.; Jones, A. H. M.; Morris, John, eds. (1971). The Prosopography of the Later Roman Empire: Volume I, AD 260–395. Cambridge: Cambridge University Press. ISBN 0-521-07233-6.
- Sivan, Hagith, Ausonius of Bordeaux: Genesis of a Gallic Aristocracy (1993)

Political offices
| Preceded by Syagrius; Eucherius | Consul of the Roman Empire; 382 with Afranius Syagrius | Succeeded by Merobaudes II; Saturninus |
