= Saturninus (magister militum) =

Roman general and politician

Flavius Saturninus (Greek: Σατουρνίνος; fl. 377–400 AD) was a Roman army officer and politician.

== Life ==
Saturninus was probably a Christian: it is known that he hosted a bishop, that he donated to a monastery and that he was in touch for a short time with Gregory of Nazianzus.

He followed the military career, and in 377/378 he fought against the Goths. After the inconclusive Battle of the Willows, the Eastern Emperor Valens, who was in the Eastern frontier, appointed Saturninus temporary commander of cavalry and sent him to Thrace with a cavalry unit, to support the magister peditum Traianus. Saturninus and Traianus blocked the Goths near the passes of the Haemus, building a line of fortifications that repulsed the Gothic attacks. The two generals hoped to force the Goths to suffer through the cold winter and the scarcity of food in order to force them into submission; alternatively, the two generals planned to call back the sentinels, luring the Goths of Fritigern into an open-field battle in the plains between the Haemus and the Danube, where they were confident of winning. However, Fritigern did not accept battle, but enlisted Hunnic and Alan reinforcements. Saturninus realised that he could no longer fight the enemy with his troops, lifted the block on the mountain passes, and retired.

As magister militum per Thracias, Emperor Theodosius I, who had succeeded Valens after his death in the Battle of Adrianople, entrusted Saturninus to negotiate peace with the Goths: in October 382 he signed a treaty according to which the Goths were to live in the Low Danube as foederati. This successful negotiation guaranteed Saturninus the imperial favour, and he was appointed consul for the year 383. Themistius dedicated to him a panegyric.

In 400 Saturninus was serving under the Eastern Emperor Arcadius, when the magister militum Gainas deposed and exiled him.

== Sources ==
- Hartmut Leppin, Theodosius der Große, Darmstadt 2003, p. 275.
- Adolf Lippold, "Saturninus 4", in Der Kleine Pauly, Vol. 4, p. 1570.

Preceded by Claudius Antonius; Afranius Syagrius	Roman consul 383 with Merobaudes II	Succeeded by Ricomer; Clearchus
