= 419 BC =

419 BC in various calendars
- Gregorian calendar: 419 BC; CDXIX BC
- Ab urbe condita: 335
- Ancient Egypt era: XXVII dynasty, 107
- Pharaoh: Darius II of Persia, 5
- Ancient Greek Olympiad (summer): 90th Olympiad, year 2
- Assyrian calendar: 4332
- Balinese saka calendar: N/A
- Bengali calendar: −1012 – −1011
- Berber calendar: 532
- Buddhist calendar: 126
- Burmese calendar: −1056
- Byzantine calendar: 5090–5091
- Chinese calendar: 辛酉年 (Metal Rooster); 2279 or 2072 — to — 壬戌年 (Water Dog); 2280 or 2073
- Coptic calendar: −702 – −701
- Discordian calendar: 748
- Ethiopian calendar: −426 – −425
- Hebrew calendar: 3342–3343
- Hindu calendars
- Vikram Samvat: −362 – −361
- Shaka Samvat: N/A
- Kali Yuga: 2682–2683
- Holocene calendar: 9582
- Iranian calendar: 1040 BP – 1039 BP
- Islamic calendar: 1072 BH – 1071 BH
- Javanese calendar: N/A
- Julian calendar: N/A
- Korean calendar: 1915
- Minguo calendar: 2330 before ROC 民前2330年
- Nanakshahi calendar: −1886
- Thai solar calendar: 124–125
- Tibetan calendar: ལྕགས་མོ་བྱ་ལོ་ (female Iron-Bird) −292 or −673 or −1445 — to — ཆུ་ཕོ་ཁྱི་ལོ་ (male Water-Dog) −291 or −672 or −1444

Year 419 BC was a year of the pre-Julian Roman calendar. At the time, it was known as the Year of the Tribunate of Lanatus, Rutilus, Tricipitinus and Axilla (or, less frequently, year 335 Ab urbe condita). The denomination 419 BC for this year has been used since the early medieval period, when the Anno Domini calendar era became the prevalent method in Europe for naming years.

== Events ==
=== By place ===
==== Greece ====
- Despite the Peace of Nicias still being in effect, Sparta's King Agis II gathers a strong army at Philus and descends upon Argos by marching at night from the north. His allied Boeotian forces fail him, but he is able to conclude a treaty with Argos. In 419 BC, the Argives, at the instigation of Alcibiades, attacked Epidaurus; and Agis with a large force from Lacedaemon set out and marched to the frontier city of Leuctra. No one, Thucydides tells us, knew the purpose of this expedition. It was probably to make a diversion in favour of Epidaurus.

=== By topic ===
==== Drama ====
- Euripides' play Andromache is performed.
- Sophocles' play Electra is performed. The play takes its theme from The Libation Bearers by Aeschylus.
