= Syagrius (consul 381) =

Flavius Syagrius was the consul for the year 381 with Flavius Eucherius as his colleague.

Political offices
Preceded by Gratianus Augustus V, and Theodosius Augustus	Consul of the Roman Empire; 381 with Flavius Julius Eucherius	Succeeded by Afranius Syagrius, and Claudius Antonius
