= Afranius Syagrius =

Roman politician

Afranius Syagrius (Note: His name appears in some inscriptions as Flavius Syagrius, in which the 'Flavius' functions as an honorific rather than part of his actual name.) (fl. 345–382) was a Roman politician and administrator.

== Life ==
Afranius was a member of the Roman aristocratic family of the Syagrii, which originated in Lyon. In the same years in which Afranius lived, another Syagrius is attested (he was consul in 381), and it is not always possible to distinguish the career of the two Syagrii.

In 369, Afranius is attested as notarius. In that year, the Roman Emperor Valentinian I removed him from his office after a failed military operation, and Afranius dedicated himself to private life.

He continued his career under Emperor Gratian, possibly because of his friendship with the poet Ausonius. Afranius was magister memoriae in 379, when someone named Theodorus succeeded him. Between June 18, 380, and August of 382 he is attested as Praetorian prefect of Italy. In 381 he was also praefectus urbi of Rome and Consul in 382.

== See also ==
- Afrania gens
- Tonantius Ferreolus (prefect), maternal grandson

== Citations ==
Political offices
| Preceded by Syagrius; Eucherius | Consul of the Roman Empire; 382 with Claudius Antonius | Succeeded by Merobaudes II; Saturninus |
| Preceded by Anicius Paulinus | Praefectus urbi of Rome; 381 | Succeeded by Valerius Severus |
