= 419 =

419 in various calendars
- Gregorian calendar: 419; CDXIX
- Ab urbe condita: 1172
- Assyrian calendar: 5169
- Balinese saka calendar: 340–341
- Bengali calendar: −175 – −174
- Berber calendar: 1369
- Buddhist calendar: 963
- Burmese calendar: −219
- Byzantine calendar: 5927–5928
- Chinese calendar: 戊午年 (Earth Horse); 3116 or 2909 — to — 己未年 (Earth Goat); 3117 or 2910
- Coptic calendar: 135–136
- Discordian calendar: 1585
- Ethiopian calendar: 411–412
- Hebrew calendar: 4179–4180
- Hindu calendars
- Vikram Samvat: 475–476
- Shaka Samvat: 340–341
- Kali Yuga: 3519–3520
- Holocene calendar: 10419
- Iranian calendar: 203 BP – 202 BP
- Islamic calendar: 209 BH – 208 BH
- Javanese calendar: 303–304
- Julian calendar: 419; CDXIX
- Korean calendar: 2752
- Minguo calendar: 1493 before ROC 民前1493年
- Nanakshahi calendar: −1049
- Seleucid era: 730/731 AG
- Thai solar calendar: 961–962
- Tibetan calendar: ས་ཕོ་རྟ་ལོ་ (male Earth-Horse); 545 or 164 or −608 — to — ས་མོ་ལུག་ལོ་ (female Earth-Sheep); 546 or 165 or −607

Year 419 (CDXIX) was a common year starting on Wednesday of the Julian calendar. At the time, it was known as the Year of the Consulship of Monaxius and Plinta (or, less frequently, year 1172 Ab urbe condita). The denomination 419 for this year has been used since the early medieval period, when the Anno Domini calendar era became the prevalent method in Europe for naming years.

== Events ==
=== By place ===
==== Roman Empire ====
- A law is passed, prohibiting the act of instructing barbarians on shipbuilding in the Western and Eastern Roman Empires.

==== China ====
- Jin Gongdi, age 33, succeeds his developmentally disabled brother Jin Andi as emperor of the Eastern Jin Dynasty. Andi is strangled by orders of the warlord Liu Yu.

== Births ==
- July 2 – Valentinian III, emperor of the Western Roman Empire (d. 455)

== Deaths ==
- Jin Andi, emperor of the Eastern Jin Dynasty (b. 382)
