= Lü Guang's invasion of Western Qin =

- Part of the Sixteen Kingdoms period
Date	March or April 397
Location	Eastern Gansu
Result	Western Qin victory
Territorial changes	Southern Liang and Northern Liang breakaway from Later Liang

Belligerents
Later Liang	Western Qin

Commanders and leaders
Lü Guang; Lü Yan †	Qifu Gangui

Strength
40,000+	20,000

Casualties and losses
Unknown	Unknown

Lü Guang's invasion of Western Qin was a punitive invasion launched by the Heavenly King of Later Liang, Lü Guang against the state of Western Qin in March or April 397. The campaign ended in defeat for Later Liang, triggering a chain reaction of rebellions which saw the breakaway of the Southern Liang and Northern Liang dynasties.

== Prelude ==
During the Former Qin collapse that followed the Battle of Fei River, the Di general, Lü Guang returned from his expedition to the Western Regions and seized control of Liang province in 384. He was unfavourably received by the local populace, with a string of rebellions breaking out in 386, but through his military prowess, he was able to forcibly assert his authority over the region. He was eager to expand, and in 391, he declared war on the neighbouring Western Qin state to the east, which held the Longxi region and was led by the Xianbei, Qifu Gangui.

In July or August 395, Lü Guang led a massive army of 100,000 soldiers to campaign against Qin. Qifu Gangui's officials, Migui Zhou (密貴周) and Mozhe Gudi (莫者羖), both urged him to submit to Lü Guang as a vassal and to send his son, Qifu Chibo (乞伏敕勃) as a hostage. Their advice was followed and Lü Guang accepted him, so he withdrew his army. However, soon after, Gangui regretted his decision, killing Migui and Mozhe before rescinding his vassalage.

All the while, Lü Guang was only able to receive the nominal submission of Tufa Wugu, the chieftain of the Tufa tribe within his territory. In August 396, Lü Guang took the imperial title of Heavenly King. When Lü Guang's envoys visite his fortress at Lianchuan (廉川堡, in modern Haidong Prefecture, Qinghai), Wugu outwardly denounced Lü Guang and refused his titles, but at the same time, accepted his gift of musicians and artisans. Despite his show of disobedience, Lü Guang did not appear to have taken any action against Wugu and allowed him to remain as he was.

== The campaign ==
In March or April 397, Lü Guang finally decided to punish Qifu Gangui. He issued an edict stating his intention to campaign, claiming that Gangui had rebelled against him multiple times and that he was currently fighting with his own brothers. Lü Guang then marched to camp at Changsui (長最; in present-day Bairi Tibetan Autonomous County, Gansu); among the officials accompanying him were the Master of Writing, Juqu Luochou (沮渠羅仇) and the Administrator of Sanhe commandery, Juqu Quzhou (沮渠麴粥). The two were brothers and prominent leaders of the Lushuihu tribes in Zhangye commandery.

Many of Qifu Gangui's generals proposed fleeing east to Chengji (成紀, in modern Tianshui, Gansu), but Gangui was determined to repel the invasion. The bulk of Lü Guang's best soldiers were under his brother, the Duke of Tianshui, Lü Yan's command, who Gangui described as brave but foolish. Gangui believed that if he could just defeat Lü Yan, he will be able to prompt Lü Guang into withdrawing his entire army.

Lü Guang ordered his son, the Duke of Taiyuan, Lü Zuan to lead 30,000 soldiers with the generals, Yang Gui (楊軌), Dou Gou (竇苟) and others to attack Jincheng (金城; around present-day Yuzhong County, Gansu). Gangui marched out from Xicheng (西城; in modern-day Baiyin, Gansu) with 20,000 troops to relieve the city, but along the way, he was intercepted by the Liang generals, Wang Bao (王寶) and Xu Jiong (徐炅), who had 5,000 cavalry under their command. He did not dare to advance, and subsequently, Jincheng fell to Liang. Lü Guang sent a further 10,000 armored soldiers led by Liang Gong (梁恭) and Jin Shisheng (金石生) from Yangwu (陽武; west of present-day Guyuan, Ningxia) through the mountain gorges to link up with the Inspector of Qin province, Moyigan in attacking Gangui's eastern flank. Meanwhile, Lü Yan led the vanguard force from Fuhan (枹罕, in modern Linxia, Gansu) and conquered Lintao, Wushi (武始; in present-day Lintao County, Gansu) and Heguan (河關; in the vicinity of present-day Dingxi, Gansu).

At this point, Gangui was distressed and was desperate to seek the victory he needed to force the Liang army to withdraw. He sent out his soldiers to feign surrender and spread rumours in the Liang camps that his army had scattered and that he was making a disorderly retreat east to Chengji. By chance, Lü Yan believed the rumours and wanted to personally pursue Gangui with his light cavalry. His Marshal, Geng Zhi (耿稚), warned him that Gangui had a history of ambushing his enemies by pretending to appear weak. He instead suggested they re-organize their army and properly prepare for an assault on Gangui, but Lü Yan refused to heed his advice.

Lü Yan quickly chased after Gangui, but when they finally met in battle, he was defeated and killed. Geng Zhi and another general, Jiang Xian (姜顯), gathered up their scattered troops and retreated to Fuhan. Just as Gangui predicted, Lü Guang withdrew his army back to his capital, Guzang (姑臧, in modern Wuwei, Gansu).

== Aftermath ==
Immediately after withdrawing, a string of rebellions broke out in Liang. Tufa Wugu was the first to breakaway, declaring himself the King of Xiping and capturing Liang's newly acquired city of Jincheng. Lü Guang sent Dou Gou to deal with Wugu, but he suffered a great defeat at Jieting (街亭; in present-day Qin'an County, Gansu). Frustrated by his recent campaign, Lü Guang listened to slander and pinned the failure on Juqu Luochou and Juqu Quzhou. They were both executed, and at their funeral, their nephew, Juqu Mengxun rallied the Lushuihu tribes in Zhangye into rebellion, and he was joined by his cousin, Juqu Nancheng and the Han Chinese official, Duan Ye at Jiankang (建康; in modern Zhangye, Gansu). Additionally, the mystic, Guo Nun, prophesying the fall of the Lü clan, led another popular revolt at the eastern Yuancheng (東苑城), an outlying city near Guzang.

In historiography, the Tufa's state is known as the Southern Liang, while Duan Ye and the Juqu's state is known as the Northern Liang. The Later Liang was unable to cope with the new wave of rebellions, and for the next 24 years, Liang province would remain fractured, with the Western Liang also forming in 400, before the region was unified by the Northern Liang in 421.

== Bibliography ==
- Lü, Simian (1948). A History of Jin, Northern and Southern Dynasties 两晋南北朝史. Vol. 1. Shanghai: Kaiming Press.
- Rhie, Marilyn Martin (2010). The Western Ch'in in Kansu in the Sixteen Kingdoms Period and Inter-relationships with the Buddhist Art of Gandhāra. Early Buddhist Art of China and Central Asia. Vol. 3. Brill Publishers. doi:10.1163/ej.9789004184008.i-960. ISBN 978-90-04-19019-1.
- Fang, Xuanling, ed. (648). Jinshu 晉書 [Book of Jin] (in Chinese).
- Sima, Guang (1084). Zizhi Tongjian 資治通鑑 (in Chinese).
