= 401 =

401 in various calendars
Gregorian calendar	401; CDI
Ab urbe condita	1154
Assyrian calendar	5151
Balinese saka calendar	322–323
Bengali calendar	−193 – −192
Berber calendar	1351
Buddhist calendar	945
Burmese calendar	−237
Byzantine calendar	5909–5910
Chinese calendar	庚子年 (Metal Rat); 3098 or 2891 — to — 辛丑年 (Metal Ox); 3099 or 2892
Coptic calendar	117–118
Discordian calendar	1567
Ethiopian calendar	393–394
Hebrew calendar	4161–4162
- Hindu calendars
Vikram Samvat	457–458
Shaka Samvat	322–323
Kali Yuga	3501–3502
Holocene calendar	10401
Iranian calendar	221 BP – 220 BP
Islamic calendar	228 BH – 227 BH
Javanese calendar	284–285
Julian calendar	401; CDI
Korean calendar	2734
Minguo calendar	1511 before ROC 民前1511年
Nanakshahi calendar	−1067
Seleucid era	712/713 AG
Thai solar calendar	943–944
Tibetan calendar	ལྕགས་ཕོ་བྱི་བ་ལོ་ (male Iron-Rat); 527 or 146 or −626 — to — ལྕགས་མོ་གླང་ལོ་ (female Iron-Ox); 528 or 147 or −625

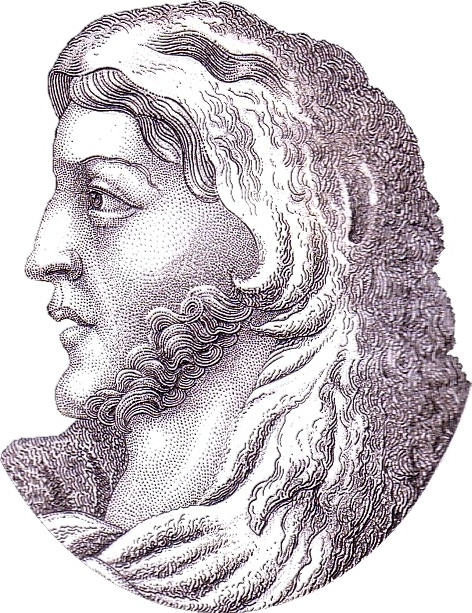
Alaric I, king of the Visigoths

Year 401 (CDI) was a common year starting on Tuesday of the Julian calendar. At the time, it was known as the Year of the Consulship of Vincentius and Fravitus (or, less frequently, year 1154 Ab urbe condita). The denomination 401 for this year has been used since the early medieval period, when the Anno Domini calendar era became the prevalent method in Europe for naming years.

== Events ==
=== By place ===
==== Roman Empire ====
- Emperor Arcadius sends many gifts to the Hunnic chieftain Uldin, in appreciation of his victory over the Goths and Gainas. Arcadius then allies himself with the Huns.
- Piracy is committed by slave-traders from Galatia (Anatolia), along the coasts of Africa.
- The old Legio II Adiutrix, part of which had always been stationed at Aquincum (modern Budapest), is divided into two comitatenses, and shipped to Britannia.
- Stilicho, Roman general (magister militum), leads his army in an extensive campaign against the Vandals in Rhaetia (Switzerland).
- The Temple of Artemis near Selçuk in Ephesus is dismantled.
- November 18 – The Visigoths, led by king Alaric I, cross the Alps and invade northern Italy.
- Emperor Honorius begins to use the city of Ravenna as a temporary center for certain administrative and military functions. The city is chosen because of its proximity to the bulk of the Western Roman army and due to the fact that its relative poverty makes it a less tempting target for barbarian invaders than cities such as Rome or Milan. This event is often misinterpreted as the establishment of Ravenna as a capital. In reality, the capital of the Western Roman Empire was not truly established at Ravenna until 408.

==== Black Sea ====
- The Chronicon Pachale (Paschal Chronicle) reports that the Black Sea is completely frozen.

==== China ====
- Kumarajiva, Kuchean Buddhist monk, arrives in Chang'an and begins translating Buddhist texts into Chinese.

=== By topic ===
==== Religion ====
- December 19 – Pope Anastasius I dies at Rome after a 2-year reign, and is succeeded by Innocent I as the 40th pope proclaiming his universal power over the whole of Christendom.
- The Mahabharata, an Indian Sanskrit epic, is finalised.

== Births ==
- April 10 – Theodosius II, Roman emperor (d. 450)
- Aelia Eudocia, Roman empress and wife of Theodosius II (approximate date)
- Leo I, Byzantine Emperor (d. 474)

== Deaths ==
- December 19 – Pope Anastasius I
- Duan Ye, prince of the Chinese state Northern Liang
- Lü Zuan, emperor of the Di state Later Liang
- Murong Sheng, emperor of the Xianbei state Later Yan (b. 373)
- Empress Yang, wife of Lü Zuan
