= Lady Zhang (Lü Shao's wife) =

Lady Zhang (張氏, personal name unknown; 386–400) was the wife of Lü Shao (Prince Yin), who briefly reigned (less than a month) as emperor of the Chinese/Di state Later Liang.

Very little is known about her, but she was described as virtuous. Her age is known at the time of her husband's death (around the new year 400, when he was described as less than 20 years old and she was 13) by suicide, as he was threatened by the troops of his brother Lü Zuan (Emperor Ling), who overthrew him and took over as emperor. After Lü Shao's death, she became a Buddhist nun.

Later, either during Lü Zuan's reign or the succeeding reign of his cousin Lü Long, Lü Long wanted to take her as a wife or a concubine; she refused, and committed suicide by jumping off a tower.
