= Empress Dowager Wei (Later Liang) =

Empress Dowager Wei (Chinese: 衛太后; personal name unknown) was an empress dowager of the Di-led Later Liang dynasty of China. She was the mother of the last emperor Lü Long.

Lady Wei was most likely the wife of Lü Long's father Lü Bao (呂寶), who was a younger brother of the founding emperor Lü Guang (Emperor Yiwu). Very little is known about her. When Lü Long became emperor after his younger brother Lü Chao (呂超) assassinated then-emperor Lü Zuan in 401, he honored her as empress dowager. There was no further historical reference to her, and it is not known whether she survived the state's destruction in 403 or her son's death in 416.
