= Empress Yang (Lü Long's wife) =

Empress Yang (楊皇后, personal name unknown) was an empress of the Chinese/Di state Later Liang. Her husband was the last emperor, Lü Long.

Very little is known about Empress Yang. She was created empress when Lü Long became emperor in 401, after his brother Lü Chao (呂超) assassinated the emperor Lü Zuan (Emperor Ling). It is not known whether she survived the state's destruction in 403 or her husband's death in 416.

Chinese royalty
Preceded by Empress Yang (Lü Zuan's wife)	Empress of Later Liang; 401–403	Dynasty ended
Preceded by Empress Yang (Lü Zuan's wife)	Empres of China (Central Gansu); 401–403	Succeeded by Empress Zhang of Later Qin
