= Princess Shi =

Later Liang empress

Princess Shi (Chinese: 石王后; personal name unknown; fl.380s-390s), who might have taken the title Empress Shi (Chinese: 石皇后) at one point, was the wife of Lü Guang (Emperor Yiwu), the founder of the Di-led Later Liang dynasty of China.

Very little is known about her. What is known is that when Lü Guang, who was then a Former Qin general, was sent by the Former Qin emperor Fu Jiān in 383 on a mission to subdue the Xiyu (西域, modern Xinjiang and former Soviet Central Asia) kingdoms, she did not accompany her husband but remained in the Former Qin capital Chang'an with his son Lü Shao, who was probably her son as well.

When Chang'an fell to Western Yan forces in 385, they fled to the semi-independent state Chouchi, and after Lü Guang established Later Liang after returning from his Xiyu mission and seizing Liang Province (涼州, modern central and western Gansu), they arrived in his capital Guzang (姑臧, in modern Wuwei, Gansu) in 389. Lü Guang, who then carried the title Prince of Sanhe, created her his princess and created Lü Shao heir apparent.

By the time he claimed the imperial title "Heavenly King" (Tian Wang) in 396 and created Lü Shao crown prince, she was not mentioned, implying that she might have died by that point, and there was no further reference to her in history. If she had in fact survived to 396, she would have likely been created empress. The table below assumes that she survived to 400 when Lü Guang died, but that was in fact not likely.

Chinese royalty
Preceded by None (dynasty founded)	Princess/Empress of Later Liang; 389–400	Succeeded by Empress Yang
Preceded by Empress Yang of Former Qin	Empress of China (Central Gansu); 389–400	Succeeded by Empress Yang
Preceded by Empress Yang of Former Qin	Empress of China (Southern Gansu/Eastern Qinghai); 389–397	Succeeded by Princess Zhejue of Southern Liang
Preceded by Empress Yang of Former Qin	Empress of China (Northern Gansu); 386–397	Succeeded by Princess Meng of Northern Liang
Preceded by Empress Yang of Former Qin	Empress of China (Western Gansu/Eastern Xinjiang); 386–398	Succeeded by Princess Meng of Northern Liang
