= Empress Yang (Lü Zuan's wife) =

Chinese empress

Empress Yang (楊皇后, personal name unknown) (died 401), formally Empress Mu (穆皇后, literally "the solemn empress"), was an empress of the Chinese/Di state Later Liang. Her husband was Lü Zuan (Emperor Ling).

== Life ==
She was the daughter of the Later Liang official Yang Huan (楊桓), who was likely ethnically Han, and was described to be very beautiful. It is not known when she married Lü Zuan. When he was assassinated by his cousin Lü Chao (呂超) in 401, she initially tried to organize the palace guards to resist Lü Chao and his brother Lü Long, but after the official Du Shang (杜尚) urged them to stop, they deserted her. Lü Chao's subordinate, the general Wei Yiduo (魏益多) then entered the palace and cut off the head from Lü Zuan's body. She commented, "When a man is dead, he is like dirt and stones and no longer has any feelings. Why do you wish to destroy his form as well?" Wei then cursed at her. Lü Chao demanded that she turn over the imperial seal, but she responded that she had already destroyed it. She subsequently left the palace, and as she was leaving, Lü Chao, believing that she might leave with treasures, tried to intercept her, and she told Lü Chao: "You and your brother unrighteously slaughtered your own clansman. I will soon be dead, and why would I want treasures?"

Lü Long subsequently took the throne, and Lü Chao became his prime minister. Lü Chao wanted to marry Empress Yang because of her beauty, and he warned Yang Huan, "If the empress committed suicide, great disasters will come to your household." Yang Huan told her of the threat, but she responded, "You sold me to the Di for wealth and power. It is enough to sell me once; how can you sell me twice?" She then committed suicide. Fearful that Lü Chao might carry out his threat, Yang Huan fled to Southern Liang's prince Tufa Lilugu.

Chinese royalty
Preceded by Princess/Empress Shi	Empress of Later Liang; 400–401	Succeeded by Empress Yang (Lü Long's wife)
