= Empress Dowager Wei =

Empress Dowager Wei may refer to:

- Empress Dowager Wei (Later Liang) (fl. 401), empress dowager of the Later Liang state
- Empress Wei (Tang dynasty) (died 710), consort and empress dowager of the Tang dynasty

== See also ==
- Empress Wei (disambiguation)
