= Lü Long =

Lü Long 呂隆
- Heavenly King of Great Liang

Heavenly King of Later Liang
- Reign: 401–403
- Predecessor: Lü Zuan
- Died: 416
Full name
- Family name: Lǚ (呂); Given name: Lóng (隆)
Era name and dates
- Shéndǐng (神鼎): 401–403
Regnal name
- Heavenly King of Great Liang (大涼天王)
- House: Lü
- Dynasty: Later Liang
- Father: Lü Bao

Lü Long (Chinese: 呂隆; died 416), courtesy name Yongji (永基), was the last ruler of the Di-led Chinese Later Liang dynasty. He was the nephew of the founding emperor Lü Guang (Emperor Yiwu), and he took the throne after his brother Lü Chao (呂超) assassinated the emperor Lü Zuan (Emperor Ling) in 401 and offered the throne to him. During his reign, Later Liang was under constant attacks by Northern Liang and Southern Liang and reduced largely to its capital Guzang (姑臧, in modern Wuwei, Gansu). In 403, Lü Long decided to end the state by surrendering Guzang to Later Qin's emperor Yao Xing. He became a Later Qin official, but after aligning himself with Yao Xing's son Yao Bi (姚弼), who made unsuccessful attempts to seize the crown prince position from Yao Hong, was executed by Yao Hong after Yao Xing's death in 416.

== Early life ==
Not much is known about Lü Long's early life, and his birthdate is not known, and virtually nothing is known about his father Lü Bao. He was described as handsome and skilled at horsemanship and archery. Late in the reign of his uncle Lü Guang (Emperor Yiwu) he served as a general, but he did not have the same prominence that his younger brother Lü Chao (呂超) had.

In 401, Lü Chao assassinated Lü Guang's son Lü Zuan (Emperor Ling) and killed Lü Zuan's brother Lü Wei (呂緯) the Duke of Longxi, and then offered the throne to Lü Long. Initially, Lü Long was hesitant to accept, but Lü Chao compared this to riding a dragon up to heaven and not being able to get off, and Lü Long accepted, using the title "Heavenly King" (Tian Wang), roughly equivalent to emperor. He honored his mother Lady Wei as empress dowager, and created his wife Lady Yang as empress. He created Lü Chao the Duke of Anding and entrusted most governmental and military affairs to him.

== Reign ==
Lü Long, however, instead of correcting Lü Zuan's rule (which was considered violent and arbitrary), continued the violence by slaughtering many strong clans within his state for the purpose of showing his authority, and the people were further alienated. After hearing this, in summer 401, the Later Qin emperor Yao Xing sent his uncle Yao Shuode (姚碩德) to launch a major attack on Later Liang. The Later Qin army quickly reached Guzang and put it under siege. Many of the non-natives in Guzang planned a rebellion to give the city to Later Qin, but were discovered, and Lü Long slaughtered them, but with Yao Shuode's pressure, Lü Chao suggested nominal submission to Later Qin, which Lü Long agreed with, sending his nephews and some 50 clans to the Later Qin capital Chang'an as hostages to guarantee his faithfulness. Per Yao Shuode's recommendation, Yao Xing created him the Duke of Jiankang, although Lü Long continued to internally use the title of Heavenly King. Yao Shuode then withdrew.

However, Lü Long continued to be under constant attack by both Southern Liang and Northern Liang, and just a few months after Yao Shuode's withdrawal Lü Chao suffered a major defeat at the hands of the Southern Liang general Tufa Rutan. Due to the wars, there was a severe famine, so much so that more than 100,000 people were starved. Every day, hundreds of the residents of Guzang pleaded to exit the city, even knowing that they would be captured to be slaves. Lü Long was angry at these behaviors, believing that this damaged his regime's image, and therefore executed these people. Lü Long tried to make peace with both Southern Liang and Northern Liang, and in 402 had a brief peace with both, even obtaining some famine relief from Northern Liang's prince Juqu Mengxun, but the peace did not last, nor did Later Qin military assistance stop the attacks.

By 403, Lü Long was desperate. Meanwhile, Later Qin officials advised Yao Xing to take control of Later Liang territory directly, believing that if Lü Long somehow survived this crisis, he would no longer be a vassal. Yao Xing therefore summoned Lü Chao to Chang'an, intending to use his absence to force Lü Long to submit. When Lü Long received the order, he decided to end the state of siege altogether by offering his territory—now not much more than Guzang itself—to Later Qin. Yao Xing sent his general Qi Nan (齊難) with a large force to protect and escort Lü Long to Chang'an. Lü Long welcomed him and then, after saying farewell to Lü Guang's temple, left for Chang'an. Later Qin took over the city, and Later Liang was no more.

== Under Later Qin rule ==
Lü Long was made a Later Qin official, and he used his Later Qin-bestowed title of Duke of Jiankang. Little is known about most of the duration that he spent under Later Qin rule. However, late in Yao Xing's reign, he became involved in the plot by Yao Xing's son Yao Bi (姚弼) the Duke of Guangping to seize the position of crown prince from his brother Yao Hong, and in 416, after a failed attempt by Yao Bi's associates to seize power in a coup, Yao Bi was forced to commit suicide, and Lü Long, along with other co-conspirators, were arrested. He was executed by Yao Hong shortly after Yao Xing then died the next day, as was his brother Lü Chao.

== Family ==
- Father
  - Lü Bao (呂寶), posthumously honored Emperor Wen, brother of Lü Guang (Emperor Yiwu)
- Mother
  - Lady Wei
- Wife
  - Empress Yang
- Brother
  - Lü Chao

Emperor Ling of (Later) Liang House of Lü Died: 416
Regnal titles
Preceded by Lü Zuan	Emperor of Later Liang; 401–403	Extinct
Chinese royalty
New creation	Duke of Jiankang; 403–416	Extinct
Titles in pretence
Preceded by Lü Zuan	— TITULAR — Emperor of China; 401–403; Reason for succession failure: Annexed by Later Qin	Succeeded by Yao Xing
