= Lü Shao =

Lü Shao 呂紹
- Heavenly King of Great Liang

Heavenly King of Later Liang
- Reign: 399–400
- Predecessor: Lü Guang
- Successor: Lü Zuan
- Died: c.February 400
Full name
- Family name: Lǚ (呂); Given name: Shào (紹)
Era name and dates
- Lóng fēi (龍飛): 399–400
Regnal name
- Heavenly King of Great Liang (大涼天王)
Posthumous name
- Prince Yǐn (隱王, lit. "unrevealing")
- House: Lü
- Dynasty: Later Liang
- Father: Lü Guang

Lü Shao (Chinese: 呂紹; died c.February 400), courtesy name Yongye (永業), also known by his posthumous name as the Prince Yin of Later Liang (後涼隱王), was briefly the second ruler of the Di-led Later Liang dynasty of China, ruling as its Heavenly King. He was a son of the founding emperor Lü Guang (Emperor Yiwu), but not his oldest son. Rather, he was considered Lü Guang's rightful heir because he was born of Lü Guang's wife. (His mother is therefore likely Princess Shi, although he could also be born of an even earlier wife.) His birth year is unknown, but he referred to himself as not yet 19 when he took the throne briefly in 400.

== During Lü Guang's reign ==
When Lü Guang founded Later Liang in 386 (after he had taken over Liang Province (涼州, modern central and western Gansu after a return for a military campaign in central Asia on Former Qin's behalf), Lü Shao and Lü Guang's wife Lady Shi were not with him—they had remained in the Former Qin capital Chang'an during Lü Guang's campaign, and had fled to Chouchi when Chang'an subsequently fell to Western Yan in 385. In 389, they, along with Lü Guang's brother Lü Deshi (呂德世), arrived in Later Liang territory. Lü Guang, then with the title Prince of Sanhe, created Lü Shao his heir apparent. In 396, after Lü Guang claimed the title of "Heavenly King" (Tian Wang, roughly equivalent to emperor), he created Lü Shao crown prince.

Lü Shao, however, was not Lü Guang's oldest son—he had at least two older brothers, Lü Zuan the Duke of Taiyuan and Lü Hong (呂弘) the Duke of Changshan, both of whom were regarded for their military abilities. Lü Shao was considered weak and untalented, and Later Liang's enemies (including Southern Liang and Northern Liang) took this into account when they attacked Later Liang. The only military campaign that Lü Shao was recorded to have commanded was one in summer 399, when he and Lü Zuan attacked Northern Liang's prince Duan Ye. After Duan Ye sought aid from Southern Liang's prince Tufa Wugu, and Tufa Wugu's brother Tufa Lilugu arrived to assist Duan Ye, Lü Shao and Lü Zuan were forced to withdraw.

In c.January 400, Lü Guang grew seriously ill. He ordered Lü Shao to take the throne as Heavenly King, while he himself claimed the title of retired emperor. Lü Zuan was put in charge of the military forces, and Lü Hong the government. Lü Guang told the three to be united, and that Lü Shao should trust his brothers. He also told Lü Zuan and Lü Hong that Lü Shao might not be talented, but was the rightful heir, and that they should assist him faithfully. Lü Guang died later that day.

== Coup and death ==
Initially, Lü Shao was not going to immediately announce Lü Guang's death, in fear that it might draw enemy attacks, but Lü Zuan broke down the door and forcibly entered the palace and mourned. Lü Shao became fearful and offered the throne to Lü Zuan, but Lü Zuan refused. Lü Shao's cousin Lü Chao (呂超) then secretly suggested to Lü Shao that Lü Zuan be arrested and executed, but Lü Shao refused.

However, soon thereafter (either that day or at most several days after), Lü Hong sent his assistant Jiang Ji (姜紀) to encourage Lü Zuan to seize the throne. At night, then, Lü Zuan led his personal guards to attack the palace. Lü Hong joined him. Lü Shao's guards initially resisted, and one of them, Qi Cong (齊從), hit Lü Zuan in the head with a sword but could not kill him. Lü Chao also tried to assist Lü Shao, but their forces were fearful of Lü Zuan and collapsed. Lü Shao fled to a secondary palace and committed suicide. Lü Zuan took the throne, and when he gave Lü Shao a posthumous name, he only referred to Lü Shao as prince, not emperor.

== Personal information ==
- Father
  - Lü Guang (Emperor Yiwu)
- Mother
  - Princess/Empress Shi
- Wife
  - Lady Zhang

Prince Yin of (Later) Liang House of Lü Died: 400
Regnal titles
Preceded by Lü Guang	Emperor of Later Liang; 400	Succeeded by Lü Zuan
Titles in pretence
Preceded by Lü Guang	— TITULAR — Emperor of China; 400; Reason for succession failure: Sixteen Kingdoms	Succeeded by Lü Zuan
