= Empress Dowager Yang =

Empress Dowager Yang may refer to:

- Yang Huiyu (214–278), empress dowager during Emperor Wu of Jin's reign
- Empress Yang Zhi (259–292), empress dowager during Emperor Hui of Jin's reign
- Yang Lihua (579-580), empress dowager during Emperor Jing of Northern Zhou's reign

== See also ==
- Empress Yang (disambiguation)
