= Xianning (disambiguation) =

Xianning (Chinese: 咸宁; lit. 'Completely Peaceful or Pacified') usually refers to a prefecture-level city in Hubei, China.

It may also refer to:

- Xianning County, a former name of Beilin District, Xi'an, in Shaanxi, China
- Xianning (275–280), an era name used by Emperor Wu of Jin
- Xianning (400–401), an era name used by Lü Zuan, emperor of Later Liang
