= Lady Zhang =

Lady Zhang (張夫人) may refer to:

- Lady Zhang (Eastern Wu) (d. 253), noble lady from the Eastern Wu, wife of Sun He during the Three Kingdoms period
- Lady Zhang (Lü Shao's wife) (386–c. 400), wife of Lü Shao, emperor of the Sixteen Kingdoms period state Later Liang
- Lady Zhang (Zhu Quanzhong's wife) (9th-century–904), wife of Zhu Quanzhong, who later founded Later Liang Dynasty
