= Linjia =

Linjia (麟嘉) was a Chinese era name used by several emperors of China. It may refer to:

- Linjia (316–318), era name used by Liu Cong (Han Zhao), emperor of Han Zhao (Former Zhao)
- Linjia (389–396), era name used by Lü Guang, emperor of Later Liang
