= Empress Yang =

Empress Yang may refer to:

== Empresses with surname Yáng 楊 ==
- Yang Yan (empress) (238–274), first empress of Emperor Wu of the Jin dynasty
- Yang Zhi (empress) (259–292), second empress of Emperor Wu of the Jin dynasty and Yang Yan's cousin.
- Empress Yang (Former Qin) (died 386), empress of the Chinese/Di state Former Qin
- Empress Yang (Lü Zuan's wife) (died 401), empress of the Chinese/Di state Later Liang
- Empress Yang (Lü Long's wife), empress of the Chinese/Di state Later Liang
- Yang Lihua (561–609), empress of the Chinese/Xianbei dynasty Northern Zhou
- Empress Yang (Song dynasty) (1162–1232), wife of Emperor Ningzong of Song

== Empresses with surname Yáng 羊 ==
- Yang Xianrong (died 322), empress of Emperor Hui of Jin and Liu Yao of Han-Zhao in ancient China

== See also ==
- Consort Yang (disambiguation)
