= Consort Yang =

Consort Yang may refer to:

== Yang Fei (楊妃) ==
- Consort Yang (楊妃), consort of King Zhou of Shang, a semi-fictional character from Investiture of the Gods.
- Consort Yang (?–?) (楊妃), imperial consort of Emperor Taizong of Tang, daughter of Emperor Yang of Sui, mother of Li Ke and Li Yin (李愔).
- Consort Yang (?–?) (楊妃), consort of prince Li Zhongjun (李重俊), son of Emperor Zhongzong of Tang.
- Consort Yang (died 840) (楊妃), imperial consort of Emperor Wenzong of Tang.
- Consort Yang (c. 943) (楊妃), consort of Qian Hongzuo, King of Wuyue.
- Consort Yang (?–?) (杨妃), imperial consort of Hongwu Emperor of Ming, mother of Zhu Quan.

== Yang Guifei (杨贵妃) ==
- Consort Yang (?–?) (杨贵妃), (Note: 贵妃 guifei "noble consort" is a rank of Chinese emperor's consorts. In early Tang dynasty, it is the highest rank of fei (higher than 淑妃 shufei, 德妃 defei and 贤妃 xianfei, with shu, de and xian being words describing virtues), and standing just below empress (皇后 huanghou). This rank was once demolished, but re-established in Yang Yuhuan's time.) imperial consort of Emperor Taizong of Tang, daughter of Yang Xuanjiang (杨玄奖) and granddaughter of Yang Su, mother of Li Fu (李福).
- Yang Yuhuan (719–756) (杨玉环), imperial consort of Emperor Xuanzong of Tang.
- Consort Yang (833–865) (杨贵妃), imperial consort of Emperor Yizong of Tang.
- Consort Yang (?-?) (杨贵妃), imperial consort of Emperor Shenzong of Song.
- Empress Yang (1162–1232) (杨皇后), formerly known as Noble Consort Yang (杨贵妃), wife of Emperor Ningzong of Song.

== Yang Shufei (杨淑妃) ==
- Consort Yang (984–1036) (杨淑妃), imperial consort of Emperor Zhenzong of Song, posthumously proclaimed as Empress Dowager.

== Yang Defei (杨德妃) ==
- Consort Yang (1019–1073) (杨德妃), imperial consort of Emperor Renzong of Song, posthumously renamed Yang Zongmiao (楊宗妙).

== See also ==
- Empress Yang (disambiguation)
