= Empress Wei =

Empress Wei may refer to:

- Wei Zifu (died 91 BC), empress of the Han dynasty
- Empress Dowager Wei (Later Liang) (fl. 401), empress dowager of the Later Liang state
- Empress Wei (Tang dynasty) (died 710), consort and empress dowager of the Tang dynasty
