= Zhang Lu =

Zhang Lu may refer to:

- Zhang Lu (Han dynasty) (张鲁, died 216), Eastern Han dynasty warlord
- Zhang Lu (painter) (张路, 1464–1538), painter
- Zhang Lu (singer) (张露, 1932–2009), singer
- Zhang Lu (football broadcaster) (张路, born 1951), football broadcaster and commentator, Vice President of Beijing Guo'an FC
- Zhang Lü (张律, born 1962), filmmaker
- Zhang Lu (taikonaut) (张陆, born 1976), taikonaut
- Zhang Lu (interpreter) (张璐, born 1977), diplomat and interpreter
- Zhang Lu (midfielder) (张璐, born 1987), professional football player
- Zhang Lu (goalkeeper) (张鹭, born 1987), professional football goalkeeper
- Zhang Lu (speed skater) (张路, born 1988), speed skater
- Lu Zhang (venture capitalist), Chinese-American venture capitalist
