= Lu Zhang (venture capitalist) =

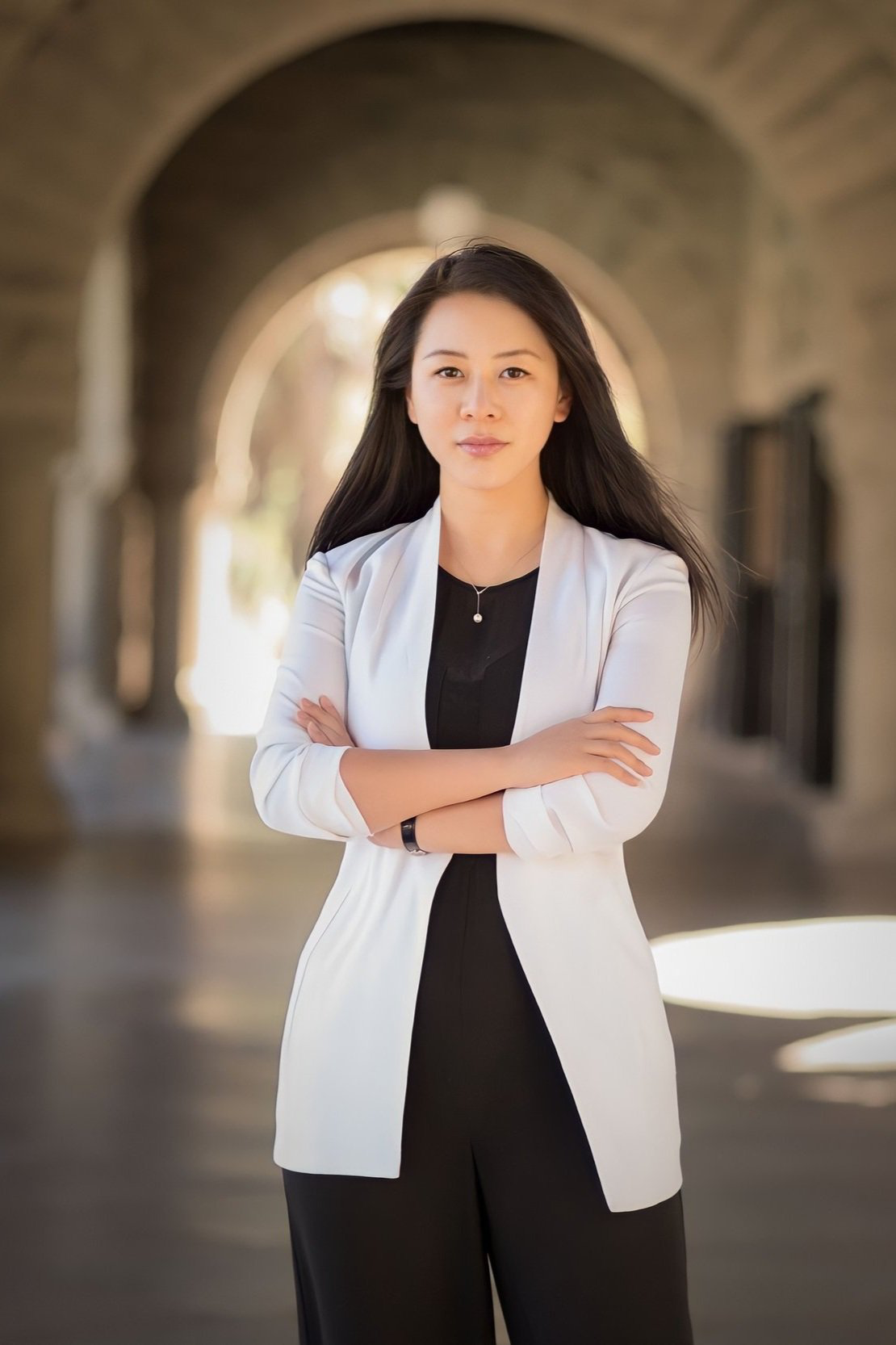
- Born: Inner Mongolia, China
- Education: Tianjin University and Stanford University
- Occupations: Entrepreneur, Venture capitalist
- Known for: Founder and managing partner of Fusion Fund

Lu Zhang is American venture capitalist, entrepreneur, and the founder and managing partner of Fusion Fund, a Silicon Valley-based venture capital firm. Zhang was a Forbes 30 Under 30 featured Honoree in the venture capital category and has been recognized as a Young Global Leader by the World Economic Forum.She is also on the board of CommonSpirit Health Foundation and is a founding commissioner of AI for Good Global Commission.

== Early life and education ==
Lu Zhang was born and raised in Inner Mongolia, China. She earned her Bachelor of Engineering from Tianjin University. She moved to the United States in 2010 and later earned a Master of Science in Materials Science and Engineering from Stanford University.

== Career ==
At the beginning of her career, while at Stanford, Zhang developed non-invasive diagnostic technologies for Type 2 diabetes. At the age of 21, she founded her first healthcare AI company based on her research, and successfully exited the business by the age of 24.

In 2015, Lu Zhang founded Fusion Fund, a venture capital firm headquartered in Palo Alto, California. The firm focuses on early-stage investments in enterprise AI, healthcare AI, and deep tech, primarily within the U.S. and Canada. Its portfolio also spans space tech, cybersecurity, industry robotics, and digital health.

In early 2025, Fusion Fund closed its fourth fund, Fusion Fund IV, at $190 million in committed capital after the fund was oversubscribed within about five months. The close brought the firms total assets under management to more than $500 million across a portfolio of more than 100 companies.

== Board and advisory roles ==
In 2026, Zhang was named a Founding Commissioner of the AI for Good Global Commission, a multistakeholder initiative co-chaired by president Paul Kagame and Marc Benioff, with ITU Secretary-General Doreen Bogdan-Martin as Vice Chair.
