= Heavenly King =

Chinese honorific title

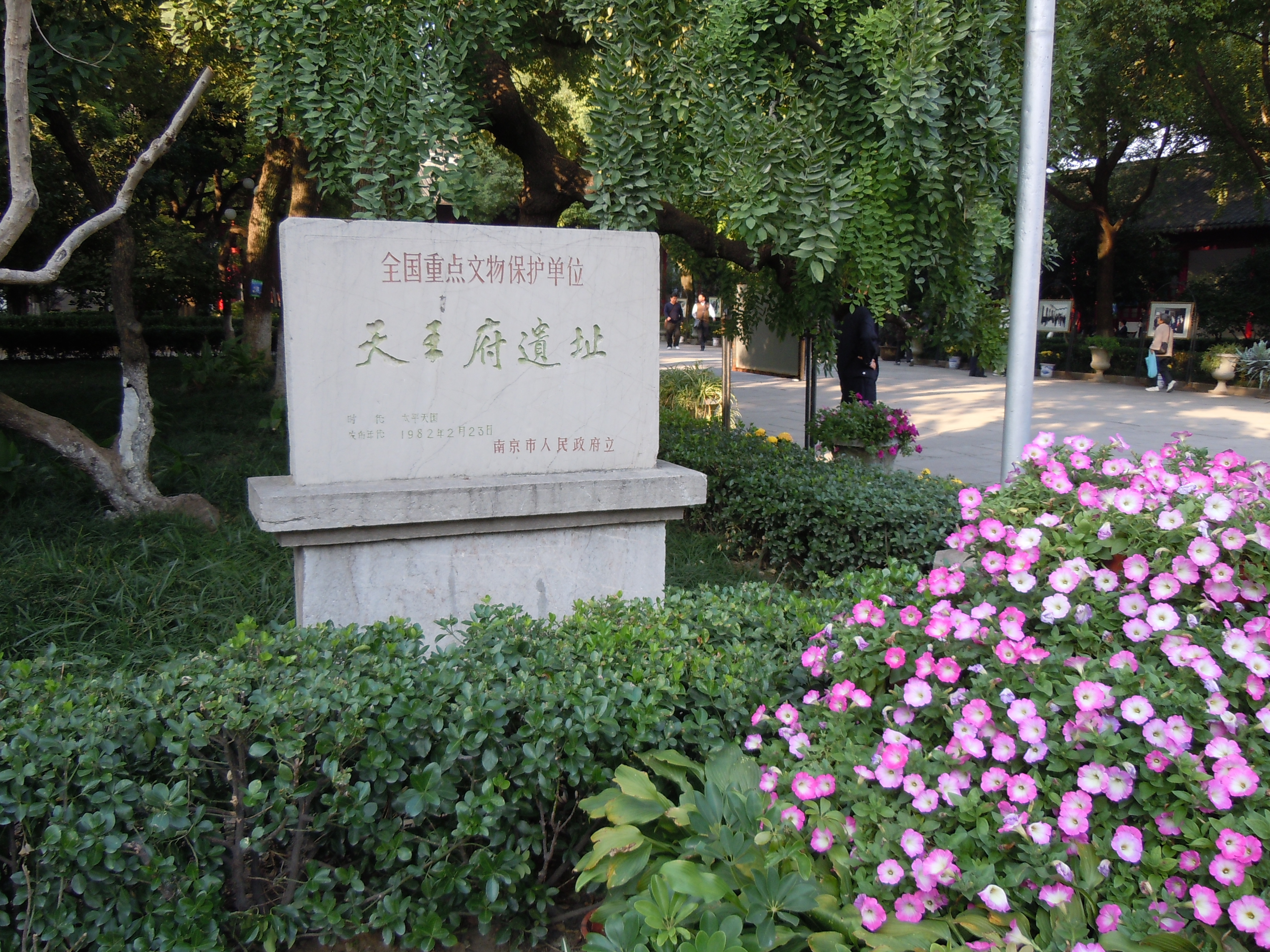
A historical marker at the Nanjing Presidential Palace mentioning the term "Heavenly King" in its title (Chinese: 天王府遗址; lit. 'Heavenly King Seat of Government Relics')

Heavenly King or Tian Wang (Chinese: 天王; pinyin: Tiān Wáng; Wade–Giles: Tien^{1}-wang^{2}), also translated as Heavenly Prince, is a Chinese title for various religious deities and divine leaders throughout history, as well as an alternate form of the term Son of Heaven, referring to the emperor. The Chinese term for Heavenly King consists of two Chinese characters: 天 (tiān), meaning "heaven" or "sky", and 王 (wáng), which could mean either "king" or "prince" depending on the context. The term was most notably used in its most recent sense as the title of the kings of the Taiping Heavenly Kingdom, but is also used in religious (particularly Buddhist) contexts as well.

== Historical uses ==
=== Spring and Autumn period ===
In the Spring and Autumn period, the term Heavenly King was used to at least some extent to refer to the kings of the Zhou Dynasty. On the second page of the first text of the Spring and Autumn Annals, the term Heavenly King is used in the description of how the Zhou King helped pay for the funeral expenses of a duke's son who had died:

秋，七月，天王使宰咺來歸惠公仲子之賵。

— Line 7, Book 1 of the Spring and Autumn Annals
Translation:

In autumn, during the 7th month, the Heavenly King was brought to tears and bestowed a contribution to the funerary expenses of Duke Zhong's son.

The use of Heavenly King in this text is analogous to the term Son of Heaven.

- Western Zhou: After Crown Prince Yijiu (宜臼) was deposed by King You of Zhou, he fled to his maternal grandfather, the Marquis of Shen. Shen allied with the marquises of Xu (許), Zeng (鄫), and others to set Yijiu up as Heavenly King. King You marched against him, but Yijiu called in the Quanrong. The Quanrong killed King You and overran Haojing, the Western Zhou capital, plundering it despite Yijiu's presence. Unable to restrain them, Yijiu removed the court to Luoyi (雒邑), and the Eastern Zhou period began.

=== Sixteen Kingdoms period ===
During the period of the Sixteen Kingdoms, the term Heavenly King was especially common to refer to the leaders of Chinese states. Some notable examples states whose kings used this term include:

- Han-Zhao: Jin Zhun, a consort kin who seized the Han government in a coup, proclaimed himself Heavenly King of Han in 318.
- Later Zhao: Shi Le, the founding ruler of Later Zhao, first took the title King of Zhao. In 330 he proclaimed himself Heavenly King, and later that same year declared himself emperor. After Shi Le's death in 333, his nephew Shi Hu seized the throne after killing his son and heir, Shi Hong. At first Shi Hu styled himself Grand King of Zhao (大趙王), but in 334 he changed his title to Regent Heavenly King of Zhao (居攝趙天王), and in 337 he finally adopted the grander title Heavenly King of Great Zhao (大趙天王).
- Ran Wei: Ran Min proclaimed himself Emperor of Ran Wei, a state which he created in 350. However, he was posthumously honored as Heavenly King by the Former Yan.
- Former Qin: Fu Jian, the third emperor of the Former Qin, proclaimed himself as Heavenly King of Great Qin (大秦天王). during his reign, as well as his wife becoming "Heavenly Mistress".
- Zhai Wei: Zhai Liao, the founder of Zhai Wei, used the title Heavenly King. Zhai's son, Zhai Zhao used the title as well before the collapse of his state.
- Later Liang: Lü Guang proclaimed himself Heavenly King upon the creation of the Later Liang state in 396. His son Lü Shao used the term during his brief rule in 400, as well as Lü Zuan, Lü Guang's eldest son and pretender to the throne, who seized power as the state's last leader until 401.
- Later Qin: Yao Chang, the founding ruler of Later Qin, broke with his sovereign Fu Jian and proclaimed himself Eternal King of Qin (萬年秦王). His son, Yao Xing, at first ruled as Emperor, but in 399 he styled himself Heavenly King, only to restore the imperial title shortly thereafter.
- Later Yan: Murong Sheng proclaimed himself as Commoner Heavenly King (Chinese: 庶人天王; pinyin: shùrén tiānwáng). Meanwhile, Murong Xi used the Heavenly King title.
- Northern Yan: Gao Yun, Feng Ba, and Feng Hong all proclaimed themselves as Heavenly Kings during their rule as king of Northern Yan.
- Helian Xia: Helian Bobo proclaimed himself as Heavenly King of Great Xia (大夏天王) when he founded his state of Xia in 407.

=== Northern and Southern Dynasties period ===
- Northern Zhou: Yuwen Jue, the first monarch of Northern Zhou, ascended the throne as Heavenly King of Great Zhou (大周天王). Before long, he was killed by the dominant regent Yuwen Hu, who then installed Yuwen Yu on the throne, initially as Heavenly King, and later as emperor.

=== The Song dynasty period ===
- Eastern Zhen: Puxian Wannu, originally a general of the Jin, broke with Jin authority in 1215 and proclaimed himself Heavenly King of Great Zhen (大眞天王).
- Southern Song: Yang Yao was a peasant rebel leader in Hunan during the Southern Song. He gathered a force of about 80,000, took the title of Grand Sage Heavenly King (大聖天王), and held the Dongting Lake region. In 1135 he was defeated by Song forces and the uprising came to an end.

=== Taiping Heavenly Kingdom ===
The most recent historical, as well as most well known use of the title Heavenly King of Great Peace is from the rule of Hong Xiuquan during the Taiping Heavenly Kingdom. Unlike previous leaders such as those during the Sixteen Kingdoms period, the rationale behind proclaiming himself a "heavenly" king is quite different. The Taiping Heavenly Kingdom's origins were deeply rooted in quasi-nationalism and religious zeal, with Hong having stated that he had received direct orders from God to become king. This reasoning behind becoming king led to Hong believing that he had been appointed to become a heavenly king, that is, a king appointed directly by heaven inside a directly appointed heavenly kingdom.

Though the title of Heavenly King in the scope of the Taiping Heavenly Kingdom would be passed down to Hong Xiuquan's son, Hong Tianguifu upon his death; Hong Tianguifu was executed shortly after becoming king as a teenager, spelling an end to the use of the title in the scope of the Taiping Heavenly Kingdom.

== Religious uses ==
The term Heavenly King is used even today in a limited scope within Chinese Buddhism, with a much more religious meaning than most of its uses as a title. An example of its use is within the Four Heavenly Kings. The Four Heavenly Kings are four Buddhist gods, each of whom represents one cardinal direction. They are Vaiśravaṇa (Chinese: 多闻天王; pinyin: Duōwén Tiānwáng), Virūḍhaka (增長天王; Zēngzhǎng Tiānwáng), Dhṛtarāṣṭra (持国天王; Chíguó Tiānwáng), and Virūpākṣa (广目天王; Guǎngmù Tiānwáng).

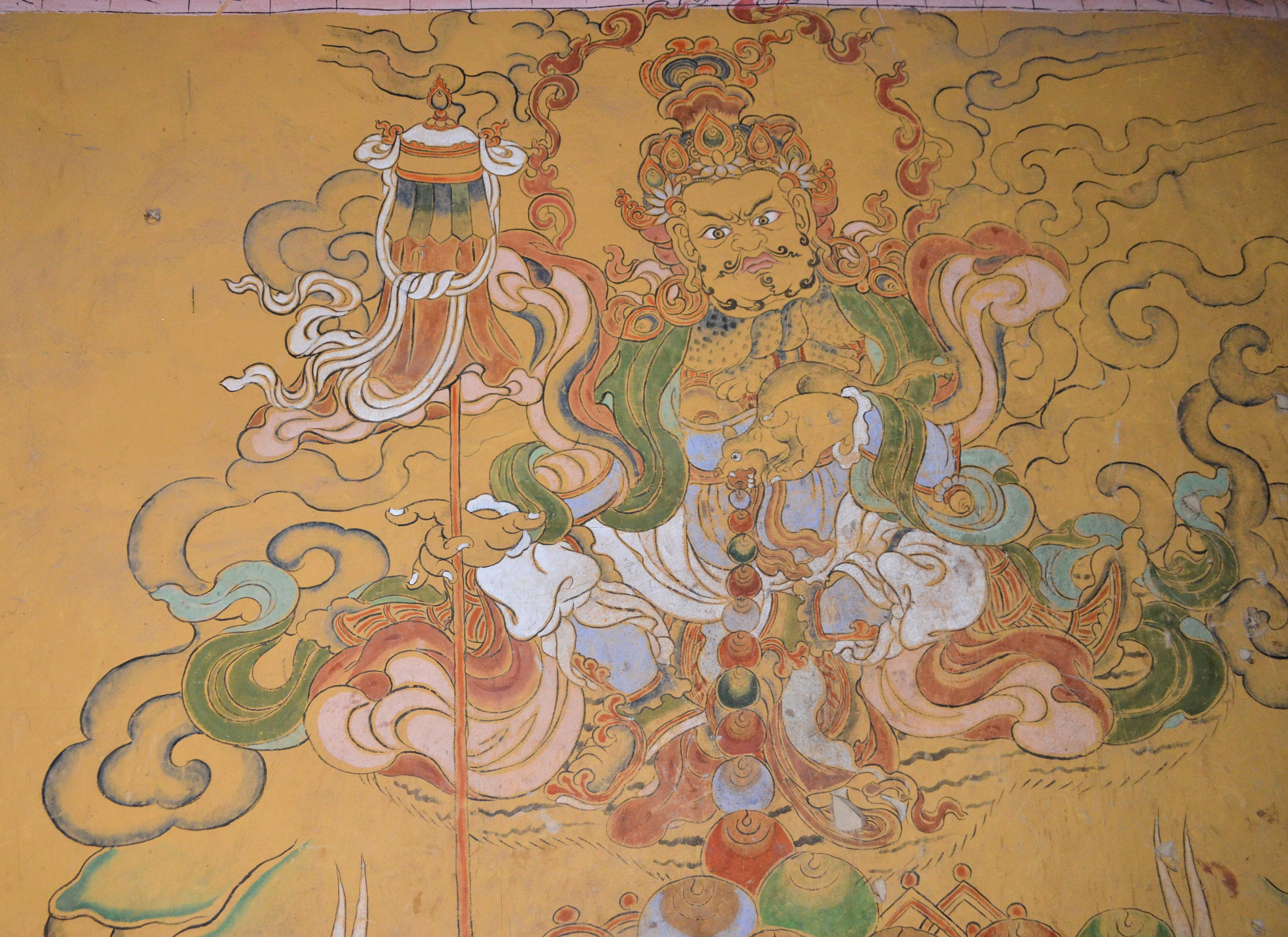
Guardian of the North, Vaiśravaṇa

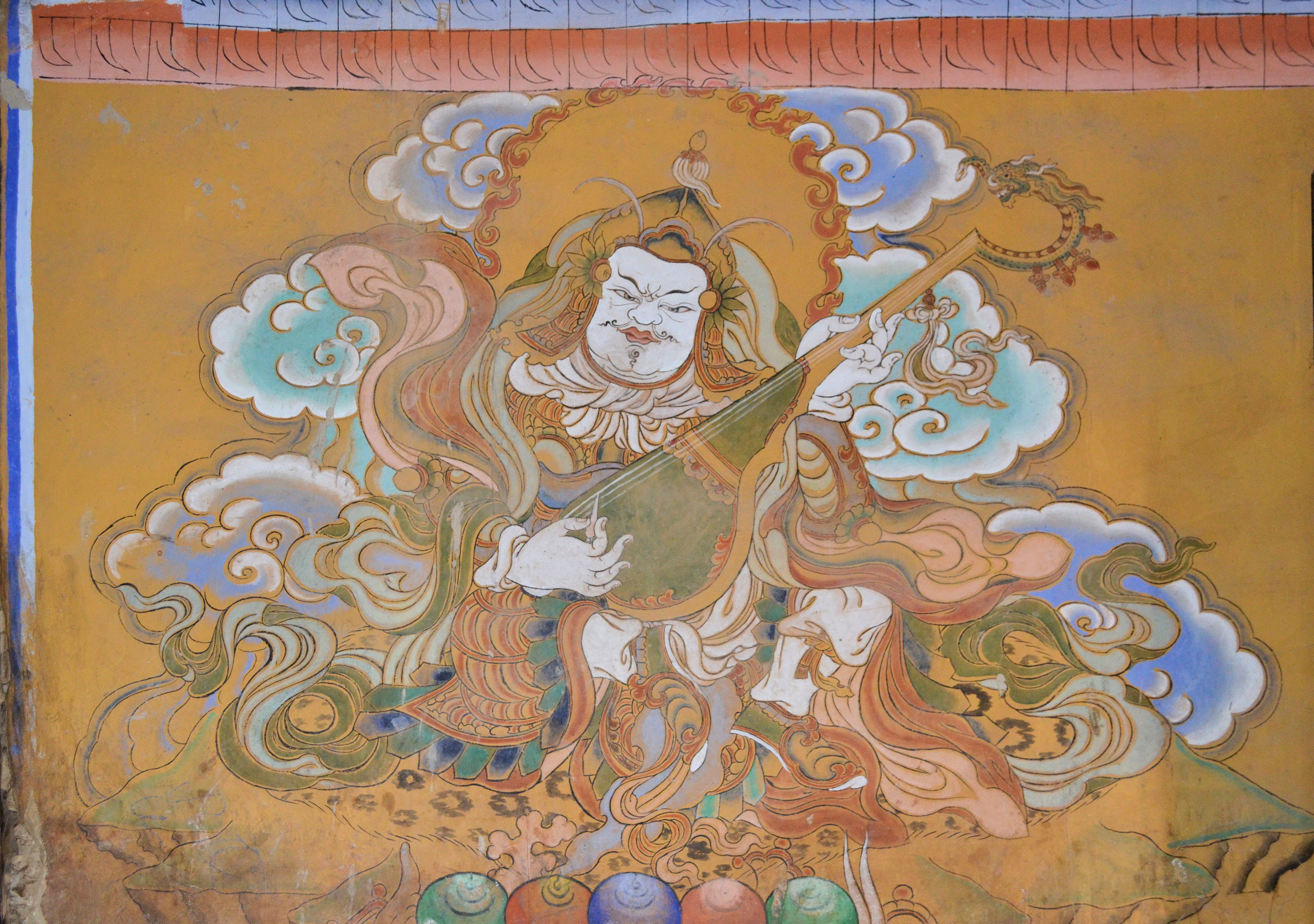
Guardian of the East, Dhṛtarāṣṭra

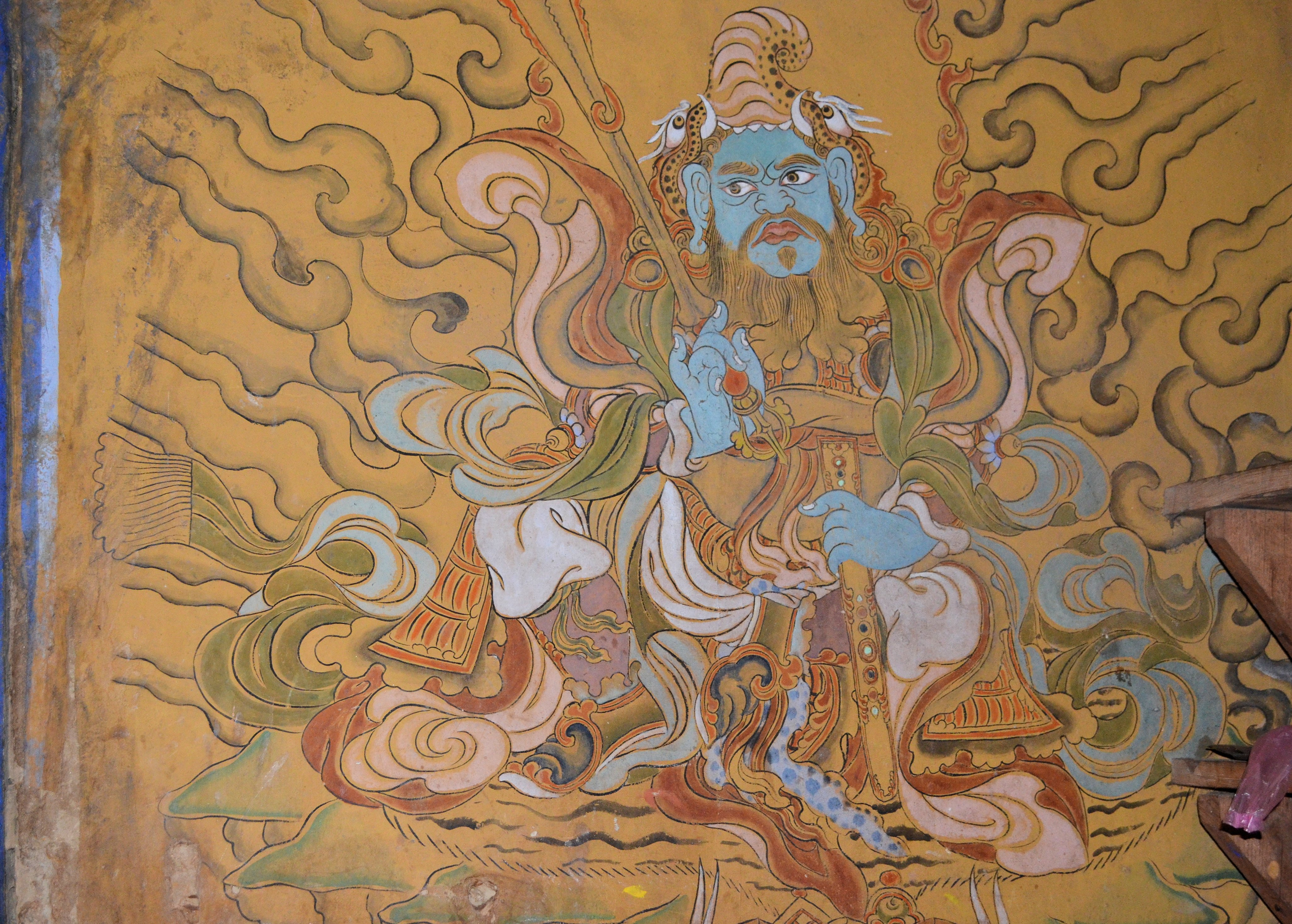
Guardian of the South, Virūḍhaka

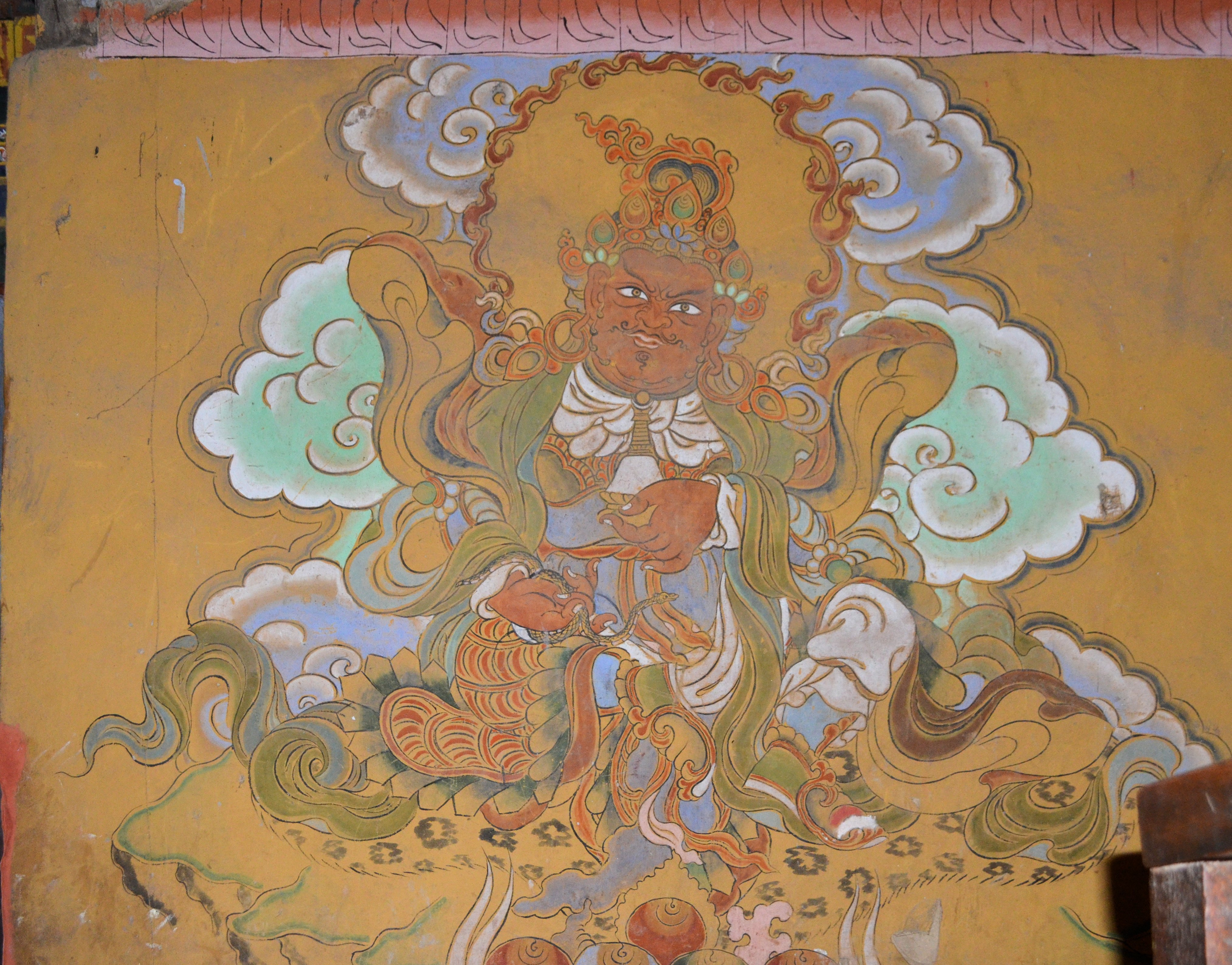
Guardian of the West, Virūpākṣa

== Uses in other countries ==
Outside China, the term Heavenly King has been sometimes used as a title to refer to a ruling king or divine entity. Two countries which have done this include Korea and Vietnam, both of which are in the Chinese cultural sphere of influence, especially historically. In Korea the term is used as a title for Hwanung, the legendary founder of Gojoseon, while in Vietnam it is used to refer to the mythical folk hero Thánh Gióng. In Japan, the title was not used but rather different; the Emperor of Japan uses a similar title, 天皇 (heavenly emperor).

== See also ==
- High king
- Chinese sovereign
- Chinese nobility
- Emperor of China
- Puxian Wannu
- Hong Xiuquan
