= Lü Guang =

Founding emperor of Later Liang

Emperor Yiwu of Later Liang 後涼懿武帝
- Heavenly King of Great Liang
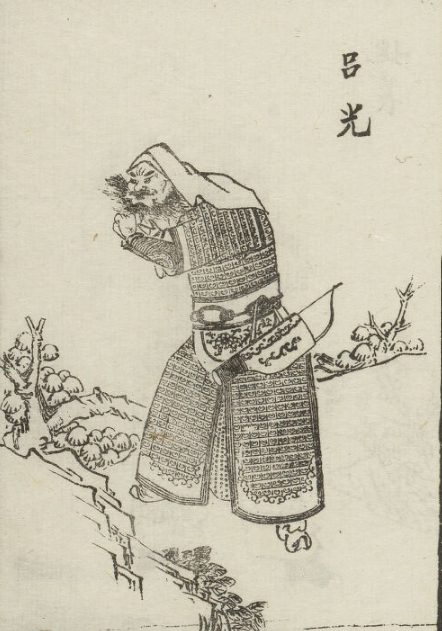

Heavenly King of Later Liang
- Reign: 386–399
- Successor: Lü Shao
- Born: 337
- Died: 400 (aged 62–63)
- Burial: Gao Mausoleum (高陵)
Full name
- Family name: Lǚ (呂); Given name: Guāng (光)
Era dates
- Tài ān (太安): 386–389; Lín jiā (麟嘉): 389–396; Lóng fēi (龍飛): 396–400
Regnal name
- 386–389: Ordered to hold tally; Palace Attendant; Grand Commander in charge of imperial government and regional affairs, supervising military affairs in Longyou and Hexi; Grand General; Governor of Liang Province; Duke of Jiuquan (使持節 侍中 中外大都督 督隴右河西諸軍事 大將軍 涼州牧 酒泉公) 389–396: Prince of Sanhe (三河王) since 396: Heavenly King of Great Liang (大涼天王)
Posthumous name
- Emperor Yìwǔ (懿武皇帝, lit. "benevolent and martial")
Temple name
- Tàizǔ (太祖)
- House: Lü
- Dynasty: Later Liang
- Father: Lü Polou

Lü Guang (Chinese: 呂光; 337 – c.January 400), courtesy name Shiming (世明), also known by his posthumous name as Emperor Yiwu of Later Liang (後涼懿武帝), was the founding emperor of the Di-led Chinese Later Liang dynasty (although during most of his reign, he used the title "Heavenly King"). He was initially a Former Qin general, but in light of Former Qin's collapse starting in 384, he decided to found his own state, initially including nearly all of modern Gansu. As his reign continued, however, his domain dwindled after Southern Liang and Northern Liang declared independence. His death in early 400 left Later Liang in an unstable state, and it would be no more by 403.

== Early life and career as Former Qin general ==
Lü Guang was ethnically Di (although he claimed ancestry from an ethnically Han man named Lü Wenhe (呂文和) who fled from Pei County (in modern Xuzhou, Jiangsu, the same county that Han dynasty emperors' ancestors came) from a disaster and who settled in Di lands). He was born in 337, when his father Lü Polou (呂婆樓) was a follower of the Di chieftain and Later Zhao general Pu Hong (蒲洪, who later changed his family name from Pu to Fu). Eventually, after Fu Hong's son Fu Jiàn founded Former Qin, Lü Polou served on the staff of Fu Jiàn's nephew Fu Jiān (notice different tone) the Prince of Donghai. After Fu Jiān overthrew Fu Jiàn's violent and capricious son and successor Fu Sheng in 357, Fu Jiān claimed the throne and made Lü Polou one of his senior advisors. Lü Guang, however, was not well regarded by his father's colleagues, because he did not study much and instead concentrated his efforts on hunting and riding. However, Fu Jiān's prime minister Wang Meng valued him and persuaded Fu Jiān to make him a general. He first received renown when he, while fighting with the army of the warlord Zhang Ping (張平) in 358, defeated and captured Zhang Ping's fierce adoptive son Zhang Ci (張蚝).

When Fu Jiān's cousins Fu Sou (苻廋) the Duke of Wei, Fu Liu (苻柳) the Duke of Jin, Fu Wu (苻武) the Duke of Yan, and brother Fu Shuang (苻雙) the Duke of Zhao rebelled together in 367, Lü Guang was one of the generals sent against Fu Shuang and Fu Wu, and he contributed much to defeating the rebellion. Later, after he served under Wang Meng in the campaign destroying rival Former Yan in 370, he was created the Marquess of Duting.

In 378, Lü Guang was serving as the assistant to Fu Jiān's cousin Fu Chong (苻重) the Duke of Beihai, who, as the governor of Yu Province (豫州, modern Henan) was in charge of the important city Luoyang. Fu Chong planned a rebellion, and Fu Jiān learned this and ordered Lü to arrest Fu Chong, which Lü did successfully. (However, Fu Jiān did not execute Fu Chong but only relieved him of his posts and not even his ducal title.)

In 380, inexplicably, Fu Jiān made Fu Chong the defender of Jicheng (modern Beijing), and Fu Chong soon rebelled along with his brother, the powerful general Fu Luo (苻洛) the Duke of Xingtang. Lü Guang was one of the generals in charge of the campaign against Fu Luo and Fu Chong, and he defeated Fu Chong and killed him, resulting in Fu Luo's subsequent defeat and capture.

In 382, in response to requests by the kings of two Xiyu states—Xiumiduo (休密馱) the King of Shanshan and Mitian (彌窴) the King of Front Cheshi (roughly modern Turpan Prefecture, Xinjiang) -- Fu Jiān commissioned Lü Guang to lead an army of 100,000 infantry soldiers and 5,000 cavalry soldiers to Xiyu, with the intent to, like Han dynasty did, establish a governor general over Xiyu. The army departed the Former Qin capital Chang'an in spring 383, with the two kings as guides. By early 384, most Xiyu kingdoms had submitted, but Bo Chun (帛純) the King of Qiuzi (or Kucha, 龜茲, in modern Aksu Prefecture, Xinjiang) resisted, and Lü put Qiuzi under siege, forcing Bochun to flee. He made Bo Chun's brother Bo Zhen (帛震) the new king, and he also, in a move to show Former Qin suzerainty over Xiyu, ordered the Xiyu kings to turn over the Han dynasty imperial rods that they had still possessed and exchanged them for Former Qin ones. By this point, however, Former Qin was disintegrating in light of rebellions that happened after its defeat at the Battle of Fei River against Jin, and although Fu Jiān wanted to make Lü the governor general of Xiyu, he was unable to have the commission delivered to Lü. While at Qiuzi, Lü met the Buddhist monk Kumarajiva, and when he, in 385, considered settling in Qiuzi (after hearing of the unrest Former Qin was suffering from), Kumarajiva advised against it, stating that Qiuzi was a land of misfortune and, if he headed back east, he would find a homeland on the way. Lü therefore started to head back east, carrying the plunder he had gathered in Xiyu.

Former Qin's governor of the rich Liang Province (涼州, modern central and western Gansu and eastern Xinjiang), Liang Xi (梁熙), was weary of Lü's intentions, and he considered sealing the borders and refusing Lü entry. His advisor Yang Han (楊翰) suggested that he cut off the Gaowu Valley (高梧谷, in modern Turpan Prefecture, Xinjiang) or Yiwu Passes (伊吾關, in modern Kumul Prefecture, Xinjiang) to defeat Lü by thirst, but Liang refused. Yang then surrendered to Lü, who quickly advanced on the capital of Liang Province, Guzang (姑臧, in modern Wuwei, Gansu), capturing Liang Xi and quickly controlling most of Liang Province. For the next several years, he battled local warlords. In winter 386, upon hearing the news of Fu Jiān's death (Fu Jiān having died in 385), he changed the era name to Tai'an—signifying a declaration of independence, although at this point he claimed no formal regal or imperial titles—and therefore 386 is typically considered the date of Later Liang's founding.

== Early reign – laying Later Liang's foundation ==
Around the new year 387, Lü Guang claimed the title of Duke of Jiuquan—the first formal title of nobility that he claimed for himself that showed a claim on his territory. He concentrated on consolidating his power in Liang Province, while appearing to ignore the deadlock that what remained of Former Qin (under Fu Deng) and Later Qin (under Yao Chang) were having, to his southeast.

In fall 387, Lü Guang captured and executed Zhang Dayu (張大豫), the son of Former Liang's last prince Zhang Tianxi, who had tried for several years to reestablish Former Liang.

It appeared that Lü was not a particularly effective governor of his domain, and there were repeated rebellions against his rule. In response, he instituted strict laws. His official Duan Ye tried to speak against such strict laws in 388, and while Lü Guang indicated that he agreed with Duan, it appeared that he did not actually make things easier for his people.

In spring 389, Lü Guang claimed the greater title the Prince of Sanhe. Around this time, his wife Lady Shi, son Lü Shao, and brother Lü Deshi (呂德世) arrived in Guzang after having spent several years in Chouchi. He created Lady Shi princess and Lü Shao heir apparent.

In 391, Lü Guang tried to make a surprise attack against Western Qin while its prince, Qifu Gangui, was attacking the chieftain of the Poduoluo (破多羅) tribe, Moyigan, but Qifu Gangui quickly responded upon hearing about the attack, and so Lü Guang withdrew. This appeared to, however, start a series of battles with Western Qin. In 392, Lü Guang sent his brother Lü Bao (呂寶) against Western Qin and son Lü Zuan against Western Qin's vassal, the Qiang chief Peng Xi'nian (彭奚念), and both Lü Bao and Lü Zuan were defeated, although Lü Guang then personally attacked Peng, capturing Peng's city Fuhan (枹罕, in modern Linxia Hui Autonomous Prefecture, Gansu) and forcing him to flee.

In 394, Lü Guang received nominal submission by the powerful Xianbei chief Tufa Wugu, the words of whose advisor Shizhen Ruoliu (石真若留) indirectly showed that Later Liang was in its prime at this point—as Shizhen regarded Later Liang capable of destroying the Tufa tribe at will.

In fall 394, Lü Guang sent his son Lü Fu (呂覆) to take up the defense post at Gaochang (高昌, in modern Turpan Prefecture, Xinjiang), and at this point, Later Liang appeared to be in control of a substantial part of Xiyu.

In fall 395, Lü Guang made a major attack against Western Qin, and Qifu Gangui submitted as a vassal, sending his son Qifu Chibo (乞伏敕勃) as a hostage. However, Qifu Gangui soon regretted this arrangement, and executed his officials Mi Guizhou (密貴周) and Mozhe Gudi (莫者羖羝), who suggested it. Presumably, he also repudiated his submission to Lü Guang.

In 396, Lü Guang claimed the title "Heavenly King" (Tian Wang), signifying a claim to imperial title. He created Lü Shao crown prince, and created 20 of his brothers, sons, and nephews dukes or marquesses, and he bestowed titles on his officials as well. However, when he, as a part of these commissions, he tried to grant titles on Tufa Wugu, Tufa Wugu told Lü Guang's ambassador:

Heavenly King Lü's sons are all corrupt and immoral. His nephews are particularly violent and cruel. People both near and far are angry and ready to rebel. How can I go against the people and accept these unjust titles? I am about to claim a regal title myself.

Tufa therefore rejected the titles, although he kept the musicians and artisans that Lü Guang sent to him as part of the title bestowment. While Tufa's remarks were intended to have a propaganda effect, they were probably not inaccurate, based on later events.

== Late reign – gradual collapse of Later Liang ==
Later Liang's power appeared to start to fall apart in 397, when Lü Guang, determined to punish Qifu Gangui for his shifting positions, launched a major attack against Western Qin's capital Xicheng (西城, in modern Baiyin, Gansu). This frightened Qifu Gangui's officials enough that they recommended a retreat to Chengji (成紀, in modern Tianshui, Gansu) to the east, but Qifu Gangui, seeing weaknesses in Later Liang's forces despite their numbers, stood his ground. Later Liang forces were initially successful, capturing several major Western Qin cities, but Qifu Gangui tricked Lü Guang's brother and major general Lü Yan (呂延) the Duke of Tianshui into believing that he was retreating, and Lü Yan fell into a trap Qifu Gangui set and was killed. Lü Guang, in fear, withdrew to Guzang.

Soon after Lü Yan's defeat, Tufa Wugu declared himself independent from Later Liang, establishing Southern Liang and capturing Jincheng (金城, in modern Lanzhou, Gansu), which Later Liang had just captured from Western Qin. Lü Guang sent his general Dou Gou (竇苟) to attack Tufa Wugu, but was defeated.

After Lü Yan's death, Lü Guang believed false accusations against Lü Yan's assistants, the brothers Juqu Luochou (沮渠羅仇) and Juqu Quzhou (沮渠麴粥) and executed them. Their nephew Juqu Mengxun escorted their caskets back to their home territory of Zhangye (張掖, in modern Zhangye, Gansu) and then persuaded the various Xiongnu tribes to rebel against Later Liang. Initially, Lü Guang sent Lü Zuan to attack Juqu Mengxun and chased him into the mountains, but Juqu Mengxun's cousin Juqu Nancheng (沮渠男成) also rebelled and sieged the Later Liang city Jiankang (建康, in modern Zhangye, Gansu, not to be confused with Jin's capital of the same name). Juqu Nancheng persuaded the governor of Jiankang Commandery, Duan Ye, who was already fearful that Lü Guang would blame him for the Juqus' rebellion, to join them, and Juqu Nancheng offered the title of Duke of Jiankang to Duan Ye, thus establishing Northern Liang. Lü Zuan attacked the nascent state, but could not destroy it.

At this time, the magician Guo Nen (郭黁), whom Lü Guang and his people had trusted greatly, prophesied that Later Liang was about to be destroyed, and therefore started a rebellion himself within the capital Guzang, capturing even Lü Guang's eight grandsons and executing them cruelly. Guo soon supported the general Yang Gui (楊軌) as the leader of the rebellion. Lü Zuan was forced to abandon his attack against Duan and return to Guzang. Eventually, however, Yang and Guo were defeated by Later Liang forces and forced to flee to and submit to Southern Liang and Western Qin, respectively. From this point on, however, Later Liang, by now highly reduced in size and strength, were subject to constant attacks by Southern Liang, Northern Liang, and Western Qin, causing it to be unable to hold its territory. By 398, the western parts of the Later Liang (including Xiyu holdings) had fallen to Northern Liang as well. In 399, Lü Shao and Lü Zuan launched another attack on Northern Liang, but with Southern Liang coming to Northern Liang's aid, they were forced to withdraw.

In c.January 400, Lü Guang grew gravely ill, and he ordered Lü Shao to take the throne and the title Heavenly King; he himself claimed the title of retired emperor. Realizing that Lü Shao lacked talents and ability, he spoke to Lü Shao and his brothers Lü Zuan the Duke of Taiyuan and Lü Hong (呂弘) the Duke of Changshan, telling Lü Shao to trust his brothers and Lü Zuan and Lü Hong to serve Lü Shao faithfully. He died later that day. Soon, however, Lü Zuan and Lü Hong would turn on Lü Shao, and when they started a coup, Lü Shao committed suicide, and Lü Zuan took the throne, starting a series of destabilizing internal disturbances that, in combination with the attacks by the surrounding states, led to Later Liang's surrender to Later Qin in 403.

== Personal information ==
- Father
  - Lü Polou (呂婆樓), minister during reigns of Fu Jiàn, Fu Sheng, and Fu Jiān of Former Qin
- Wife
  - Princess/Empress Shi (created 389)
- Concubines
  - Consort Zhao, mother of Lü Zuan
- Children
  - Lü Zuan (呂篡), the Duke of Taiyuan, later Emperor Ling
  - Lü Hong (呂弘), initially the Duke of Changshan, later the Duke of Fanhe (created 399, executed by Lü Zuan 400)
  - Lü Shao (呂紹), the Crown Prince (created 396), later emperor
  - Lü Wei (呂緯), the Duke of Longxi (executed by Lü Chao 401)
  - Lü Fu (呂覆)

Emperor Yiwu of (Later) Liang House of Lü Born: 337 Died: 400
Regnal titles
Preceded by Himself as Prince of Sanhe	Emperor of Later Liang; 396–400	Succeeded by Lü Shao
Chinese royalty
Preceded by Himself as Duke of Jiuquan	Prince of Sanhe; 389–396	Succeeded by Himself as Emperor of Later Liang
Chinese nobility
New creation	Duke of Jiuquan; 386–389	Succeeded by Himself as Prince of Sanhe
Titles in pretence
Preceded by Fu Pi	— TITULAR — Emperor of China; 386–400; Reason for succession failure: Sixteen Kingdoms	Succeeded by Lü Shao
Preceded by Fu Pi	— TITULAR — Emperor of China; 386–400; Reason for succession failure: Sixteen Kingdoms	Succeeded by Tufa Wugu
Preceded by Fu Pi	— TITULAR — Emperor of China; 386–400; Reason for succession failure: Sixteen Kingdoms	Succeeded by Duan Ye
