= Lü Zuan =

Emperor Ling of Later Liang 後涼靈帝
- Heavenly King of Great Liang

Heavenly King of Later Liang
- Reign: 400–401
- Predecessor: Lü Shao
- Successor: Lü Long
- Died: 401
- Burial: Baishi Mausoleum (白石陵)
Full name
- Family name: Lǚ (呂); Given name: Zuǎn (纂)
Era name and dates
- Xián níng (咸寧): 400–401
Regnal name
- Heavenly King of Great Liang (大涼天王)
Posthumous name
- Emperor Líng (靈皇帝, lit. "unattentive")
- House: Lü
- Dynasty: Later Liang
- Father: Lü Guang

Lü Zuan (Chinese: 呂纂; died March 401), courtesy name Yongxu (永緒), also known by his posthumous name as Emperor Ling of Later Liang (後涼靈帝), was a monarch of the Di-led Later Liang dynasty of China, ruling as its Heavenly King. He was the oldest son of the founding emperor Lü Guang (Emperor Yiwu), but was not Lü Guang's rightful heir, as he was not born of Lü Guang's wife Princess Shi. After Lü Guang died in c.January 400, however, he seized the throne from his younger brother Lü Shao in a coup.

Lü Zuan was considered a capable general tactically, but not skilled in general strategy, and during his reign Later Liang's strength continued to be sapped, as it was during the late reign of Lü Guang, by attacks of rivals Northern Liang and Southern Liang dynasties. Despite this, Lü Zuan continued to occupy himself with hunting and other unimportant matters. In 401, he was assassinated by his cousin Lü Chao (呂超), who then supported his own older brother Lü Long as emperor.

== During Lü Guang's reign ==
Lü Zuan was described as favoring exercises in archery, horsemanship, and hunting when he was young, when he was a university student at the Former Qin capital Chang'an during the reign of Fu Jiān, where he was not studious. When Former Qin collapsed in the midst of multiple rebellions in 384 and 385, Lü Zuan fled initially to Shanggui (上邽, in modern Tianshui, Gansu), and then to Guzang (姑臧, in modern Wuwei, Gansu), where his father had established Later Liang and placed his capital.

The first actual historical reference to Lü Zuan was in 392, when he served as one of his father Lü Guang's generals in his campaign against Qifu Gangui, the prince of Western Qin, and Lü Zuan was unsuccessful in his attack on Qifu Gangui. In 397, Lü Guang, who had by then claimed imperial title, sent his son Lü Zuan (then referred to as the Duke of Taiyuan) and his brother Lü Yan (呂延) against Qifu Gangui, who had previously agreed to be a vassal and then changed his mind. Initially, Lü Zuan was successful, capturing the important city Jincheng (金城, in modern Lanzhou, Gansu), but after his uncle was defeated and killed in a trap laid by Qifu Gangui, Lü Zuan was forced to withdraw.

Throughout the rest of Lü Guang's reign, Lü Zuan became the general that his father relied on the most. In 397, when the Xiongnu general Juqu Mengxun rebelled, Lü Guang sent Lü Zuan against him, and Lü Zuan was initially successful in defeating Juqu Mengxun and forcing him to flee. However, after Juqu Mengxun's cousin Juqu Nancheng (沮渠男成) persuaded the official Duan Ye to join them and establish Northern Liang, Lü Guang was faced with a serious rebellion at Guzang itself—a rebellion by the general Yang Gui (楊軌) and the magician Guo Nen (郭黁), and Lü Zuan, while he had Duan Ye's capital Jiankang (建康, in modern Zhangye, Gansu) under siege, was forced to withdraw to fight Yang and Guo, allowing Duan Ye's nascent state to survive. In 398, Lü Zuan and his brother Lü Hong (呂弘) joined forces and defeated Yang and Guo, forcing them to surrender to Southern Liang and Western Qin, respectively.

In 399, Lü Zuan and his brother Lü Shao, Lü Guang's heir apparent, attacked Northern Liang, and were initially successfully, but after Southern Liang's prince Tufa Wugu sent Yang Gui and his brother Tufa Lilugu to aid Northern Liang, Lü Zuan and Lü Shao were forced to withdraw.

== Coup against Lü Shao ==
Around the new year 400, Lü Guang grew seriously ill. He ordered Lü Shao to take the throne as "Heavenly King" (Tian Wang), while he himself claimed the title of retired emperor. Lü Zuan was put in charge of the military forces, and Lü Hong the government. Lü Guang told the three to be united, and that Lü Shao should trust his brothers. He also told Lü Zuan and Lü Hong that Lü Shao might not be talented, but was the rightful heir, and that they should assist him faithfully. Lü Guang died later that day.

Initially, Lü Shao was not going to immediately announce Lü Guang's death, in fear that it might draw enemy attacks, but Lü Zuan broke down the door and forcibly entered the palace and mourned. Lü Shao became fearful and offered the throne to Lü Zuan, but Lü Zuan refused. Lü Shao's cousin Lü Chao (呂超) then secretly suggested to Lü Shao that Lü Zuan be arrested and executed, but Lü Shao refused.

However, soon thereafter (either that day or at most several days after), Lü Shao sent his assistant Jiang Ji (姜紀) to encourage Lü Zuan to seize the throne. At night, then, Lü Zuan led his personal guards to attack the palace. Lü Hong joined him. Lü Shao's guards initially resisted, and one of them, Qi Cong (齊從), hit Lü Zuan in the head with a sword but could not kill him. Lü Chao also tried to assist Lü Shao, but their forces were fearful of Lü Zuan and collapsed. Lü Shao fled to a secondary palace and committed suicide. Lü Zuan took the throne.

== Reign ==
Lü Zuan initially entrusted Lü Hong with all governmental matters, and also tried to show generosity by pardoning Qi Chong and Lü Chao. However, Lü Zuan and Lü Hong soon became suspicious of each other, and in spring 400, Lü Hong rebelled with his troops. Lü Zuan defeated Lü Hong's rebellion, and permitted his troops to pillage even the capital city Guzang itself, rewarding the women of the secondary district Dongwan (東苑, eastern half of Guzang) to his soldiers—including Lü Hong's wife and daughters. While he later relented and cancelled those orders under suggestion of Fang Gui (房晷), the damage had been done. When Lü Hong was subsequently captured during his flight to Southern Liang, Lü Zuan had him executed cruelly—by having his ribs repeatedly bounded.

Also in 400, Lü Zuan created his wife Lady Yang empress.

Lü Zuan soon started a campaign against Southern Liang, whose prince was by now Tufa Lilugu, but he was quickly defeated by Tufa Lilugu's brother Tufa Rutan. In summer, he started another campaign against Northern Liang, which was initially successful, as he put Northern Liang's new capital Zhangye (張掖, in modern Zhangye, Gansu) under siege, but as the official Jiang Ji (姜紀), who tried to persuade him not to carry out the campaign, predicted, Tufa Rutan made a major attack and even entered the city of Guzang before retreating, forcing Lü Zuan to end his campaign against Northern Liang.

Despite these military defeats, Lü Zuan spent much of his time drinking and hunting. When his official Yang Ying (楊穎) tried to persuade him to change his ways, he thanked and apologized to Yang, but could not change his ways.

In 401, Lü Chao, without prior approval from Lü Zuan, attacked the Xianbei chief Sipan (思盤). Sipan sent his brother Qizhen (乞珍) to file a protest with Lü Zuan, and Lü Zuan summoned Lü Chao and Sipan both to Guzang, which got Lü Chao nervous. Once Lü Zuan met with both, he threatened Lü Chao with death—but had no intent to carry the threat out; rather, he intended only to scare Lü Chao. He then held a feast for Lü Chao and Sipan, intending to create peace between them. During the feast, Lü Chao's brother Lü Long repeatedly offered Lü Zuan wine, and Lü Zuan was soon drunk. He sat on a man-pulled cart and gave Lü Chao and Sipan a tour of the palace. When the cart came to a threshold between two palaces, the cart could not roll over the threshold, and Lü Zuan's guards Dou Chuan (竇川) and Luo Teng (駱騰) left their swords on the side in order to lift the cart across. As they did, Lü Chao took their swords and attacked Lü Zuan. Lü Zuan tried to combat Lü Chao, unarmed, but Lü Chao quickly pierced him with a sword. Both Dou and Luo tried to combat Lü Chao but were also killed by him. Lü Zuan's wife Empress Yang tried to mobilize the guards to combat Lü Chao, but the guards soon abandoned her, and Lü Chao made his brother Lü Long emperor to succeed Lü Zuan. Lü Zuan's head was cut off and shown to the populace, but Lü Zuan was still later given an imperial posthumous name, albeit an unflattering one.

== Personal information ==
- Father
  - Lü Guang (Emperor Yiwu)
- Wife
  - Empress Yang (created 400, committed suicide 401)

Emperor Ling of (Later) Liang House of Lü Died: 401
Regnal titles
Preceded by Lü Shao	Emperor of Later Liang; 400–401	Succeeded by Lü Long
Chinese nobility
New creation	Duke of Taiyuan; 397–400	Merge into the Crown
Titles in pretence
Preceded by Lü Shao	— TITULAR — Emperor of China; 400–401; Reason for succession failure: Sixteen Kingdoms	Succeeded by Lü Long
