= Lü Chao =

Republic of China warlord and politician

- 呂超
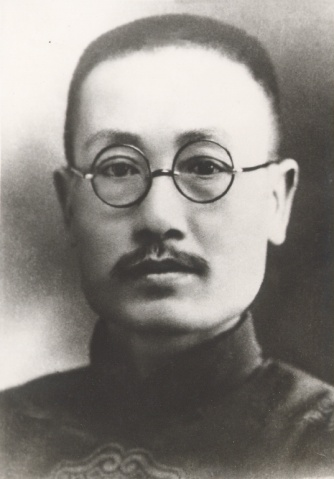
- Born: March 9, 1890; Yibin County, Sichuan, Qing China
- Died: 20 July 1951 (aged 61); Chongqing, Sichuan, People's Republic of China
- Other names: Hanjun, Wenlin
- Education: Baoding Military Academy
- Organization(s): Tongmenghui, Sichuan Clique, New Guangxi Clique
- Awards: Order of Rank and Merit

Lü Chao (March 9, 1890 – July 20, 1951), born in Xuzhou Prefecture, Yibin County, Sichuan, was a military and political figure in the early Republic of China's Warlord Era, active in his home province of Sichuan. He is known for fighting against Liu Cunhou and the Beiyang government and being one of the strongest supporters of Sun Yat-Sen in Sichuan.

== Early life ==
Lü Chao was born to a family originating in Hunan province in 1890. He entered the first phase of the Sichuan Army Elementary School, graduating in 1909. He entered the Fourth Middle School of the Army in Nanjing. During his time there, he picked up revolutionary ideals and sympathies, causing him to join the Tongmenghui. In spring 1910, he joined the Baoding Military Academy. In October 1911, with the beginning of the Wuchang Uprising, Lü went to Shanghai. Under orders from Chen Qimei, he headed North with Li Shizeng and Wang Jingwei (then known as Wang Zhaoming), where he founded the Beijing-Tianjin Tongmenghui Branch in Beijing. In February 1912, under the orders of Yuan Shikai the 3rd Division of the Beiyang Army destroyed the Beijing-Tianjin branch of the Tongmenghui. Lü fled back to Sichuan.

After returning to Sichuan, Lü Chao joined the Sichuan Army under the command of Xiong Kewu, commander of the 5th Division of the Sichuan Army. In 1913, Lü was promoted to the commander of the 2nd Regiment of the 5th Army. He participated in the Second Revolution and fled to Shanghai after it failed. He left for Japan to study, where he joined the Haoran Society. In 1914, while Sun Yat-Sen was organizing the Kuomintang in Japan, Lü joined. In December of the same year, he secretly returned to China and started participating in Anti-Yuan Shikai activities.

== Chaos in Sichuan ==
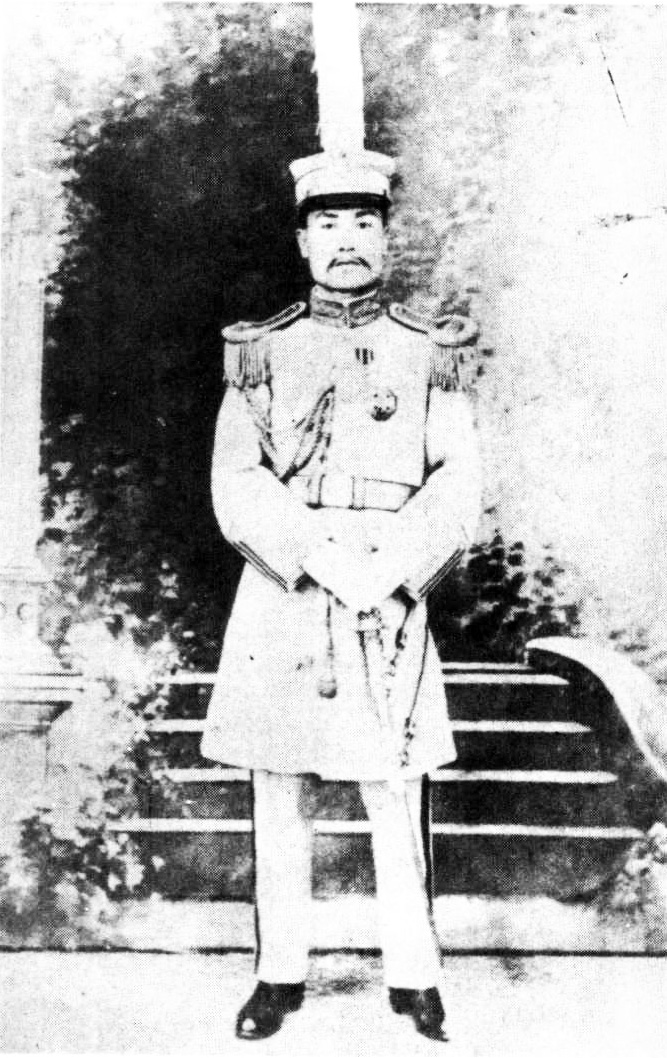

In 1915, with the breaking out of the National Protection War, Lü Chao served as the commander of revolutionary forces in Southern Sichuan, where he fought with Cai E's 1st Division against Yuan Shikai. In June 1916, Lü was made the commander of the 58th Regiment of the 5th Division. In February 1918, Sun Yat-Sen appointed Lü as the commander of the Sichuan Jingguojun. Shortly after, Lü attacked Chengdu, defeating the Beijing Government-appointed military governor Liu Cunhou, expelling him from the province. Xiong Kewu replaced him as military governor, with Yang Shukan as civilian governor and Lü being appointed commander of the 5th Division.

In 1919, Xiong Kewu started to advocate for Chinese Federalism with Chen Jiongming, Tang Jiyao, and Zhao Hengti, opposing Sun Yat-Sen. In April 1920, Lü Chao and other Kuomintang forces launched the "Anti-Xiong War", leading to the expulsion of Xiong Kewu from Chengdu, with Lü taking the position of commander-in-chief of the Sichuan Army. However, Xiong and his former enemy Liu Cunhou reconciled and fought back, expelling Lü, who, in September, was defeated and fled to Shanghai.

== Return to Sichuan and later years ==
As a direct subordinate of Sun Yat-Sen, Lü Chao was responsible for negotiations with political and military factions such as the Guominjun. In May 1923, Lü was promoted by Sun to the Generalissimo's Chief of Staff. In June, he was appointed Commander-in-Chief of the Sichuan Anti-Thief (referring to political opponents) Army, directly leading its 1st Army. He was responsible for fighting the pro-Beijing warlords Yang Sen and Liu Xiang. In March 1924, Xiong Kewu was defeated. Lü remained in Sichuan to fight against Governor of Sichuan Yang Sen. In November 1926, Lü was appointed High Pacification Commissioner of Sichuan by the National Government, an echo of the beginning of the Northern Expedition.

After the end of the Northern Expedition, Lü Chao joined Li Zongren's New Guangxi Clique. He fought against Chiang Kai-Shek but lost. In October 1939, Lü established the Chinese Anti-Japanese Reclamation Society in Chongqing to promote reclamation of territory from Japan. In January 1948, he started serving in the Supervisory Committee of the Control Yuan. In 1949, he helped the Chinese Communist Party in organizing defections of Kuomintang officers in Sichuan. In 1950, he was made a member of the Southwest Military and Political Committee of the People's Republic of China.

On July 20, 1951, Lü Chao died in Chongqing at the age of 62.
