= Later Liang (Sixteen Kingdoms) =

State of the Sixteen Kingdoms in China (386–403)

Later Liang (後涼) 酒泉 (387–389), 三河 (389–396), 涼 (396–403)
- 386–403
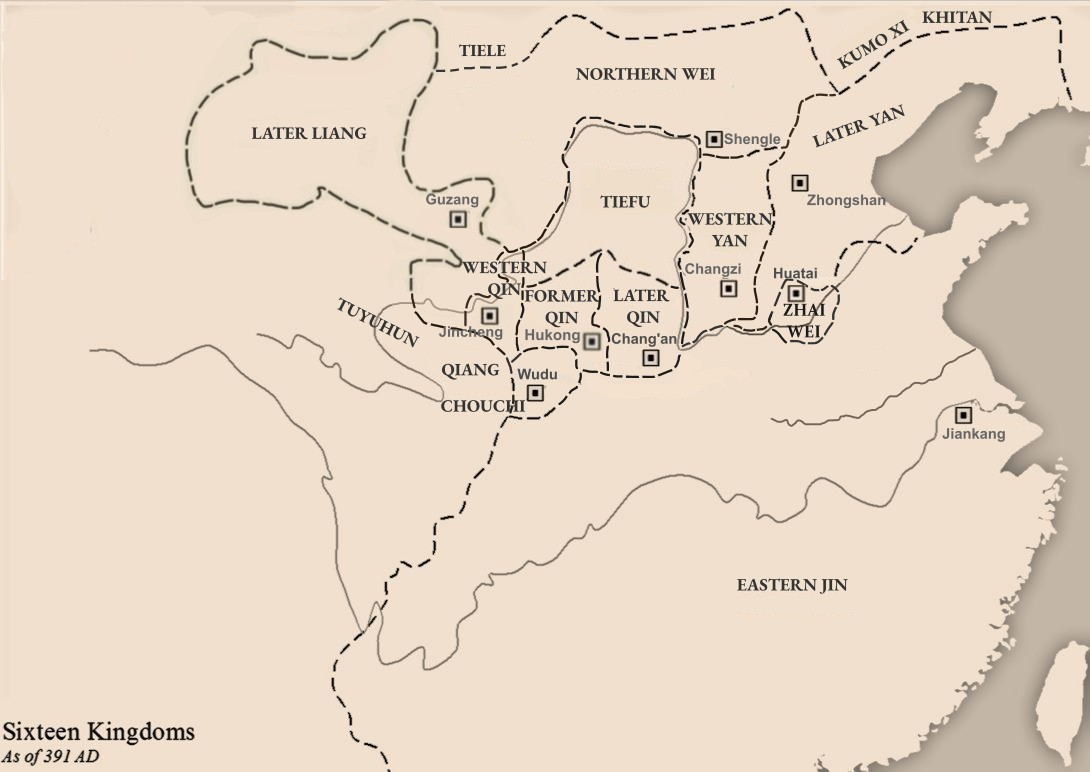
- Later Liang in the northwest
- Capital: Guzang
- Government: Monarchy
- Tian Wang
  - 386–400: Lü Guang
  - 400: Lü Shao
  - 401–403: Lü Zuan
  - 403–406: Lü Long
- History
  - Established: 386
  - Lü Guang's claiming of imperial title: 396
  - Southern Liang's and Northern Liang's independence: 397
  - Disestablished: 403
  - Lü Long's death: 416
Preceded by
Former Qin
Succeeded by
Southern Liang (Sixteen Kingdoms)
Northern Liang
Later Qin
- Today part of: China; Kyrgyzstan

The Later Liang (simplified Chinese: 后凉; traditional Chinese: 後凉; pinyin: Hòu Liáng; 386–403) was a dynastic state of China and one of the Sixteen Kingdoms in Chinese history. It was founded by the Lü family of the Di ethnicity and given the prefix of "Later" in historiography to distinguish it with the Former Liang dynasty before them and the three Liang states (Southern, Northern and Western) that emerged during their collapse.

All rulers of the Later Liang proclaimed themselves "Heavenly King" (Tian Wang). The state's founder, Lü Guang initially took on lesser titles before declaring himself Heavenly King of Liang in 396, and so the state was only known as "Liang" (涼) from 396 to 403. The Later Liang at its peak controlled the Hexi Corridor in Gansu with Guzang (姑臧, in modern Wuwei, Gansu) as their capital. After the Southern Liang and Northern Liang broke away in 397, their territory was gradually reduced to their capital region in central Gansu.

== History ==
=== Background ===
Lü Guang's family claimed descent from Lü Wenhe (呂文和), a Han Chinese from Pei Commandery who fled to Lüeyang Commandery (略陽郡; in modern Tianshui, Gansu) to escape persecution during the reign of Emperor Wen of Han (180–157 BC). The Lü integrated into the Di people of Lüeyang as chieftains and later served the Di-led Former Qin dynasty when they first established in 351. Lü Guang became a prominent general under Qin, and his father, Lü Polou was a key figure in supporting Fu Jian to the throne.

In 383, Lü Guang was ordered to lead an expedition to the Western Regions. In 384, he conquered Kucha, where he captured and met the Buddhist monk, Kumārajīva. He initially intended to settle down in the Western Regions, but at the advice of Kumārajīva, he decided to return to Former Qin with his plunders.

As he attempted to cross the Hexi Corridor back into China, the provincial inspector, Liang Xi was suspicious of Lü Guang and attempted to block his entry. However, Lü Guang defeated and executed Liang Xi, thus taking control of region and appointing himself as the new Inspector of Liang province. It was around this time when he was made aware that the Former Qin was collapsing following their defeat to the Eastern Jin at the Battle of Fei River in 383.

=== Reign of Lü Guang ===
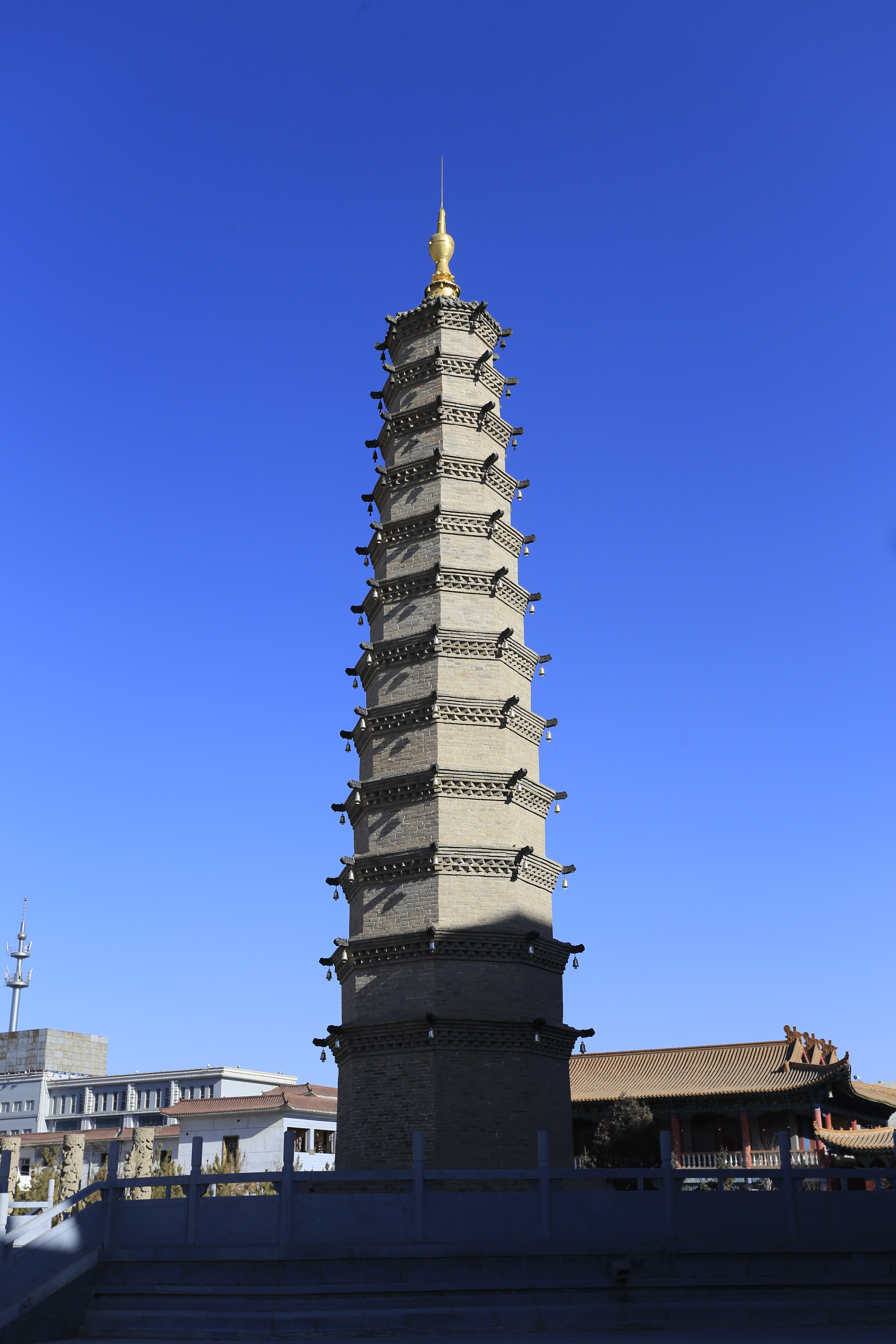
The Kumarajiva Temple Pagoda (罗什寺塔) in present-day Wuwei, Gansu. The temple and pagoda were first built during the Later Liang and underwent several expansions and repairs in the later dynasties.

In 386, after hearing of Fu Jian's death the prior year, Lü Guang posthumously honoured him as Emperor Wenzhao before introducing a new reign era at his capital, Guzang (姑臧, in modern Wuwei, Gansu). Historians consider this the beginning of the Later Liang dynasty, named so to distinguish it with the Former Liang and other Liang states from the period. However, Lü Guang would only claim an imperial title in 387, and even then, it was merely the lowly title of Duke of Jiuquan.

While a brilliant commander, Lü Guang was an unpopular ruler, as he was prone to killing his subjects and heavily relied on military might to consolidate his rule. In 386, he had several famous local literati executed, leading to a wave of rebellions breaking out in his territory, one of which was led by a member of the Former Liang ruling family, Zhang Dayu. Lü Guang managed to quell the revolts, and in 389, he elevated himself to King of Sanhe. He then began a war with the Western Qin in Longxi in 391, eventually managing to briefly force them into submission in 395. In 396, he finally claimed the title of Heavenly King of Great Liang.

In 397, intending to punish Western Qin for rebelling, Lü Guang began another campaign against them, but this time, his forces were badly routed. After this defeat, another wave of rebellions broke out in Later Liang. Most notably, the Tufa-Xianbei tribe rebelled at Lianchuan (廉川堡, in modern Haidong Prefecture, Qinghai) and founded the Southern Liang, while at Jiankang (建康, in modern Zhangye, Gansu), the Han Chinese administrator, Duan Ye, with the help of the Lushuihu Juqu family,established the Northern Liang. From here on, the Later Liang started to decline.

=== Fall ===
In 400, Lü Guang declared himself retired emperor while his eldest son to his wife, Lü Shao succeeded him as Heavenly King. However, shortly after Lü Guang died, the eldest among all of Lü Guang's son, Lü Zuan, launched a coup and forced Lü Shao to commit suicide. During his reign, Lü Zuan attacked Southern Liang and Northern Liang but to no avail. In 401, his cousin, Lü Chao had him assassinated and passed the throne to his own brother, Lü Long.

Soon after taking power, Lü Long had many of the local leaders killed. The situation in Later Liang soon became known to the Later Qin in the east, who then laid siege onto Guzang and forced Lü Long to submit as a vassal. Later Qin bestowed Lü Long the title of Duke of Jiankang and allowed him to remain at Guzang, although they also brought back with them Kumārajīva, who had been living as a captive under Later Liang. Lü Long continued to face attacks from Southern Liang and Northern Liang. No longer able to withstand the pressure, he surrendered his entire territory to Later Qin and moved to their capital of Chang'an in 403, thus ending the Later Liang.

Lü Long served as an official under Later Qin and kept his title of Duke of Jiankang. He became a confidant to the prince, Yao Bi, who plotted to usurp the role of Crown Prince from his brother, Yao Hong. However, in 416, after a failed coup, Yao Bi committed suicide and Lü Long was executed along with his brother Lü Chao.

== Rulers of the Later Liang ==
Temple name	Posthumous name	Personal name	Duration of reign	Era names
Taizu	Yiwu	Lü Guang	386–400	Tai'an (太安) 386–389; Linjia (麟嘉) 389–396; Longfei (龍飛) 396–400
–		Lü Shao	400	–
–	Ling	Lü Zuan	400–401	Xianning (咸寧) 400–401
–		Lü Long	401–403	Shending (神鼎) 401–403

== Rulers family tree ==
Later Liang

Lü Polou 呂婆樓
Lü Guang 呂光 (338–400); Yiwu 懿武 (r. 386–400)	Lu Bao 吕宝 (d. 392)
Lu Zuan 呂纂 (d. 401); Ling 靈 r. (397–)399–401	Lü Shao 呂紹 (d. 399); Yin 隱 (r. 399)	Lü Long 吕隆 (d. 416) r. 401–403(–416)

== See also ==
- Di (Five Barbarians)
- Kumarajiva
- Gansu
