= Di (Five Barbarians) =

Historical ethnic group in Chinese history

Total population
- assimilated into Han (Baima may be descended from Di)

Regions with significant populations
- northern China

Languages
- Di

Related ethnic groups
- Qiang? Baima?

The Di (Chinese: 氐; pinyin: Dī; Wade–Giles: Ti¹; < Eastern Han Chinese *tei < Old Chinese (B-S): *tˤij) were an ancient ethnic group that lived in western China, and are best known as one of the non-Han Chinese peoples known as Five Barbarians that seized power in northern China during the Sixteen Kingdoms period. This ethnic group should not be confused with the earlier Dí (狄), which refers to unrelated nomadic peoples in northern China during the earlier Zhou dynasty.

== History ==
=== Origins ===
The "Di" first appeared in the Classic of Poetry (11th to 7th century BCE), in which it referred to an unknown group of people who once paid tribute to the Shang dynasty during the reign of Tang (c.1670–1587 BCE). Later records specify that the Di lived in the regions of modern-day Gansu, western Shaanxi and northern Sichuan, with an especially dense population in area of Longnan. The term "Di" was likely an exonym given by the Chinese, as it was recorded that these people self-identified as "Hezhi" (盍稚). They were a proto-Tibeto-Burman people, and were culturally related to a broad group of western herding tribes known to the ancient Chinese as the Qiang. They were thus sometimes collectively referred to as the Di-Qiang, but unlike their more nomadic counterparts, the Di were also farmers who practiced agriculture in the river valleys and lived in wood-frame homes with mud walls. There were various distinct tribes among the Di people, each ruled by their own chieftain or king.

=== Han dynasty ===
In the 2nd century BCE, the most powerful tribe among the Di people were recorded as the Baima Di (白馬氐; "White Horse Di"), who lived in an area called Hechi (河池) or Chouchi (仇池) in modern Longnan, Gansu. In 111 BCE, as part of Emperor Wu of Han's westward expansion, the Han dynasty general, Guo Chang invaded the land of the Baima and established Wudu Commandery (武都; around present-day Longnan, Gansu) in its place. As more Han counties and commanderies were founded in the region, some of the Di tribes fled west and found refuge in the valleys around the Qinghai Lake, while the others that remained began to show resentment. In 108 BCE, the Di tribes rebelled against the Han in Wudu, but were promptly defeated. To deter further uprisings, Emperor Wu of Han had a number of their people forcibly relocated to Jiuquan Commandery in the Hexi Corridor. Another Di revolt broke out in Wudu in 80 BCE, but was quickly put down by Zhao Chongguo.

During the political upheaval of Wang Mang in the first half of the 1st century CE, the Di seized the opportunity to rebel once more and submitted to the local warlords of the Longxi and Shu regions. After Emperor Guangwu restored the Han dynasty, the Di people of Wudu, led by the powerful chieftain Qi Zhongliu (齊鐘留), defected back to Han and assisted them in their campaigns against Gongsun Shu and Wei Ao. For their contributions, some of the Di leaders were formally reinstated back to their positions as chieftains, kings and marquises, and were even bestowed with seals of office, recognizing them as official Han administrators.

=== Fall of Han and Three Kingdoms ===
The Di remained at peace for more than a century until the fall of the Han dynasty in the last 2nd century CE. With the collapse of central authority, the Di tribes were drawn into Han civil war and entered loose alliances with their surrounding warlords. In the Longxi, King Agui (阿貴) ruled over the Di people of Xingguo (興國; northeast of present-day Qin'an County, Gansu), while Yang Qianwan led the Baiqing Di at Mount Chouchi. Other Di leaders included Lei Ding (雷定) in Wudu and Xiabian (下辯; northwest of present-day Cheng County, Gansu) and Dou Mao (竇茂) in Hechi. When the Han Chancellor, Cao Cao invaded northwestern China in 211 CE, the Di tribes aligned themselves with the warlords, Ma Chao, Han Sui and Zhang Lu to resist him, but were eventually defeated.

By 217 CE, Cao Cao had reached a deadlock with his rival, Liu Bei, who held control over the Sichuan Basin. The Di homeland around Wudu became a hotly contested region between Cao Cao and Liu Bei's forces. Fearing that Liu Bei may sway the Di into defection and rebellion, Cao Cao facilitated a large-scale resettlement of the Di away from the frontlines, concentrating them in the commanderies of Jingzhao, Fufeng and Shiping (始平郡; in western Shaanxi) within the Guanzhong Basin, as well as Tianshui, Nan'an (南安郡; southeast of present-day Longxi County, Gansu) and Guangwei (廣魏; later known as Lüeyang (略陽) in modern Tianshui, Gansu) within the Longxi Basin.

The stalemate persisted into the Three Kingdoms period (220–280 CE), with the Cao Wei in northern China and Shu Han in Sichuan. Many of the Di still remained in the Wudu area, but despite their previous conflicts and concerns, the Di tribes were generally supportive of the Wei and remained submissive towards them throughout their rule. To manage the affairs of the resettled Di, the Wei court introduced the offices of the Colonel Protector Who Stabilizes the Yi (安夷護軍) and Colonel Protector Who Comforts the Yi (撫夷護軍). The Di people in the Guanzhong and Longxi underwent sinicization as they engaged in agriculture and intermingled with the local Chinese communities, but still retained their tribal affiliation.

=== Western Jin ===
After the establishment of the Western Jin dynasty (266–318 CE), however, the Colonel Protector offices were abolished, and the tribes of the Di were forcibly disbanded and turned into registered households under the local fiefdoms instead. As registered households, the Di were now obligated to pay taxes and carry out corvée labour. By 296 CE, the various minority groups in the Guanzhong and Longxi regions such as the Qiang and Lushuihu had also grown frustrated with the oppressive governance of the Prince of Zhao, Sima Lun. That year, a Di chieftain named Qi Wannian led these groups into a massive uprising against the Jin and declared himself emperor. The rebellion lasted for years, causing much devastation to the Guanzhong region along with famines and plagues as the Jin court struggled to put it down effectively. After the rebellion ended in Qi Wannian's death in 299 CE, the official, Jiang Tong, submitted a memorial to the court urging them, among others, to relocate the Di people of Guanzhong back to their old homelands in the Longnan region, but was ignored.

=== Sixteen Kingdoms ===
The Di people are considered in historiography as one of the "Five Barbarians" (together with the Xiongnu, Jie, Xianbei and Qiang) who founded most of the Sixteen Kingdoms of the 4th and early 5th centuries. The Former Qin (351–394 CE) and Later Liang (386–403 CE) were both founded by the Di people of Lüeyang Commandery (略陽郡; roughly modern day Tianshui, Gansu). The founders of Cheng-Han (304–347 CE) were actually Zong (賨) or Bandun Man people who intermixed with the Di people.

==== Cheng-Han (304–347) ====
As part of Cao Cao's resettlement strategy against Liu Bei in 215 CE, a number of Zong or Bandun Man people in Hanzhong were relocated north to Lüeyang Commandery, where they intermingled with the Di people. They became known as the Ba Di (巴氐), with "Ba" referring to the region of their ancestral home in the Sichuan Basin. Among the Ba Di people were the Li clan, and after the outbreak of Qi Wannian's rebellion in 296 CE, the family led many displaced refugees from six affected commanderies in the Guanzhong and Longxi to find refuge south in Sichuan. In 301 CE, the refugees refused to heed the Jin court's order to return north and rallied behind Li Te to rebel. In 304 CE, Li Xiong, the son of Li Te, ousted the Chinese provincial inspector from Chengdu and soon founded the state of Great Cheng (later renamed Han in 338 CE, and hence collectively known as "Cheng-Han").

Cheng-Han is considered the first of the Sixteen Kingdoms, and was the only state among them to be based within the Sichuan Basin. Their territory grew to encompass all of Sichuan, southwestern Shaanxi and parts of northern Guizhou and Yunnan, becoming a regional power in southwestern China. The ruling clan was highly sinicized, adopting the Jin style of imperial governance and showing reverence towards Taoism through the Way of the Celestial Masters sect. The state was eventually conquered by the Eastern Jin commander, Huan Wen in 347 CE.

==== Former Qin (351–394) ====
The Fu clan of the Lüeyang Di (略陽氐) were specifically from Linwei County (臨渭; in modern Qin'an County, Gansu) and claimed descent from the legendary Youhu clan from the ancient Xia period. During the collapse of the Western Jin, their chieftain, Fu Hong gathered refugees in his home commandery and proclaimed himself as the Duke of Lueyang in 310 CE. In 329 CE, he surrendered to the Jie-led Later Zhao dynasty, who later resettled him and his followers to the east in the Henan region, where he was given the important task of supervising the relocated Di and Qiang tribes. As the Later Zhao began to collapse in 349 CE, Fu Hong resolved to return to his home in the west and breakaway. In 351 CE, after entering the Guanzhong Basin and capturing Chang'an, Fu Hong's son, Fu Jiàn, established the Former Qin dynasty.

The Former Qin rose to power during the early reign of their third monarch, Fu Jiān. With the help of his Han Chinese Prime Minister, Wang Meng, the Qin formed a centralized Chinese-style bureaucracy and rapidly expanded their territory, unifying northern China and conquering Sichuan by 376 CE. Fu Jian vigorously upheld Confucianism by opening schools and presenting himself as a representative of the Middle Kingdom. At the same time, he also held Buddhism in high esteem and helped to promote the religion. Fu Jian often incorporated his defeated enemies such as the Qiang and Xianbei into his military and administration while also refusing to grant special privileges to the Di nobility at first.

With most of China under his rule, Fu Jian sought to complete the unification by conquering the Eastern Jin dynasty. In 378 CE, his forces captured the key city of Xiangyang, and two years later, he began assigning the Di nobles and soldiers to military garrisons in various parts of the empire outside of the Guanzhong Basin. In 383 CE, he led a massive force purported to be 870,000 strong and faced the outnumbered Jin army at the Battle of Fei River. Despite his numerical advantage, a defector within his rank enticed his army to make a panicked retreat, leading to a disastrous rout. Fu Jian barely escaped back to his capital, but just a year later, many of his vassals took the opportunity to rebel and fragmented his empire. Fu Jian was killed in 385 CE, and while his family continued to hold out, the Former Qin was eventually destroyed nine years later.

==== Later Liang (386–403) ====
The Lü clan were another prominent family among the Lüeyang Di, though their ancestor was a Chinese official who fled and lived among the Di to escape persecution during the Han dynasty. Under the Former Qin dynasty, the Lü became an important ally to the imperial Fu clan. In 383 CE, the general, Lü Guang was sent on an expedition to the Western Regions in the Tarim Basin, thus avoiding the chaos that followed the Battle of Fei River. Two years later, after conquering the city state of Kucha, Lü Guang returned to China. Along the way, he was met with resistance by the provincial inspector of Liang province, but prevailed and promptly took over the region of modern eastern Gansu. In 386 CE, upon receiving news of Fu Jian's death, he declared a new reign era at his capital of Guzang (姑臧, in modern Wuwei, Gansu), beginning the Later Liang dynasty.

Lü Guang was described as a capable military general but poor ruler. In 386 CE, he defeated a popular revolt led by the local Han and tribal populace. Later on, he entered a protracted war with the Xianbei Western Qin dynasty of the Longxi Basin, gaining the upper hand early on. However, in 397 CE, his forces suffered a decisive defeat to the Western Qin, and a new string of uprisings soon broke out within his territory, leading to the breakaway of the Southern Liang and Northern Liang. Lü Guang died in 400 CE, and his sons were described as even more violent than him. In 403 CE, faced with pressure from all sides, the Lü clan surrendered their territory to the Qiang-led Later Qin dynasty. The Di remained a significant population under the Later Qin and were a core fighting force within their military.

=== Five Realms of Chouchi (296–580) ===
The Di people of Qingshui County in Lüeyang Commandery were an offshoot of the Baima Di, and during the fall of Han, their chieftain, Yang Teng led them to occupy their ancestral home of Mount Chouchi. The tribe became known as the Baiqing Di (百頃氐; "Hundred Acres Di"), as the top of Mount Chouchi reportedly measured a hundred acres in area. During the Western Jin period, they briefly moved back to Lüeyang, but then returned to Chouchi following the outbreak of Qi Wannian's rebellion in 296 CE. Upon his return, their chieftain, Yang Maosou bestowed himself a princely title, founding a small independent polity that would last for nearly three centuries.

Chouchi is often divided into five periods; Former Chouchi, Later Chouchi, Wudu, Yinping and Wuxing. Despite their small size, Chouchi was able to survive by vacillating their submission between their more powerful neighbours and due to the rough mountainous terrain of the Longnan region. There was also an abundance of water springs around the mountain, which allowed their people to engage in salt production. The period of Former Chouchi lasted until 371 CE, when they were conquered by the Former Qin. After the Battle of Fei River, the state was restored as the Later Chouchi in 385 CE by Yang Ding and lasted until 443 CE, this time conquered by the Northern Wei.

With the help of the Liu Song dynasty, Chouchi was brought back by Yang Wende that same year, but the capital was shifted away from Mount Chouchi to Jialu (葭蘆; in modern Wudu, Gansu) in Wudu Commandery. This period was hence known as the Wudu period. In 477 CE, Chouchi was split into two after Yang Wendu was killed by the Northern Wei. In the south, Yang Guangxiang proclaimed himself as the King of Yinping (陰平; around present-day Wen County, Gansu) and pledged his allegiance to the Chinese Southern dynasties. In the north, the Northern Wei installed Yang Wenhong as the new ruler of Chouchi, and his successors later based their capital at Wuxing (武興; in present-day Lüeyang County, Gansu). The realm of Wuxing was conquered by the Western Wei in 553 CE, and while the fate of Yinping is not mentioned in contemporary records, it is believed that the kingdom was destroyed in 580 CE by the Northern Zhou.

=== Assimilation and descendants ===
Outside the realms of Chouchi, the Di people of northwestern China came under the rule of the Xianbei-led Northern Wei dynasty. The Di and other ethnic minority tribes were treated with disdain by the ruling Xianbei elites, who employed them as frontline auxiliaries in their armies. In response to the oppression they faced, the Di often allied with the local Han Chinese and surrounding ethnic tribes such as the Qiang and Chuge in rebellion against the Wei and their successor states. Between the period of 426 and 560 CE, it was recorded that more than 37 uprisings broke out in the northwest, most if not all of which were joined by the Di. In 566 CE, the Northern Zhou court began garrisoning militias (fubing) in the areas of Wudu, Liugu (留谷; in modern Baoji, Shaanxi) and Jinkeng (津坑; around modern Cheng County, Gansu), where the Di and Qiang frequently staged their uprisings. After the defeat of the chieftain, Yang Yong'an in 580 CE, Di rebellions were rarely mentioned in records.

The Di had long been undergoing a gradual process of sinicization, which was especially prevalent during the Former Qin and Later Qin periods. As their population dispersed and declined due to war, many of the Di cohabitated and intermarried with the Han Chinese, Qiang, Xianbei and others. By the Tang dynasty, most of them had assimilated with the Han Chinese, and those that mixed with the minority ethnic groups were eventually sinicized as well. With the rise of the Tibetan Empire to the west, the Di were also absorbed by the Tibetans before disappearing from history.

The modern Baima people (白馬人; White Horse people) living in southeast Gansu and northwest Sichuan may be descended from the Baima Di. The ancient Di might be related to the Geji (戈基) people in modern Qiang people stories.

== Culture ==
According to the 3rd century Chinese historical text, the Weilüe:

The Di have their own kings... They are not an homogenous race. They are said to be the descendants of Panhu. Some are called the Qing Di (青氐; Green Di), others the Bai Di (白氐; White Di), and others the Ran Di (蚺氐; Giant Python Di), referring to the class of reptiles in which they are placed. The people of the Middle Kingdom [Han Chinese] name them according to the colour of their clothes, but they call themselves Hezhi (盍稚). Their customs and language are not like those of the Middle Kingdom, but similar to those of the Qiang and several Hu peoples. Each person has a family name, like the family names of the Middle Kingdom. They prefer blue and deep red clothes. They are commonly skilled at weaving cloth; they are good farmers; they breed and rear pigs, oxen, horses, donkeys, and mules. When a woman marries, she wears a renlu (衽露) that, in the way that it is trimmed and decorated, sometimes resembles the renlu of the Qiang, and sometimes the tunic of the Middle Kingdom. All braid their hair. Many of them know the language of the Middle Kingdom because they have lived in the Middle Kingdom and mixed among the people. Nevertheless, when they return to their tribes they naturally speak the Di language. Their marriage (customs) resemble those of the Qiang.

— Yu Huan

== Language ==
Di
- Native to: Cheng-Han, Former Qin, Later Liang, Chouchi
- Region: Gansu, Qinghai, Sichuan, Shaanxi
- Ethnicity: Di
- Extinct: after 6th century
- Language family: unclassified Turkic? Tibetan?

Language codes
- ISO 639-3: None (mis)
- Glottolog: None

The Di language is poorly known apart from being described as different from Chinese, but similar to the Qiang. Only a few special Di names and place names have been preserved in old Chinese books. The Di are thought to have been of proto-Tibetan origin, though there is a minor theory among some scholars that the Di spoke a Turkic language.

== Notable family names ==
- Dan (啖)
- Dong (董)
- Dou (竇)
- Fan (樊)
- Fu (苻)
- Gai (蓋)
- Gong (共)
- Gou (苟)
- Jiang (姜)
- Jiao (焦)
- Kui (隗)
- Lei (雷)
- Li (李)
- Liang (梁)
- Lü (呂)
- Mao (毛)
- Qi (齊)
- Qiang (强)
- Qiu (仇)
- Shan (单)
- Tu (屠)
- Wang (王)
- Xu (徐)
- Yang (楊)
- Zhao (趙)

== See also ==
- List of past Chinese ethnic groups
- Qiang people (Ch'iang people)
- Cheng-Han
- Later Liang
- Former Qin
- Chouchi
