= 380s =

Decade

The 380s decade ran from January 1, 380, to December 31, 389.

== Events ==
=== By place ===
==== Roman Empire ====
- February 27 – Edict of Thessalonica: Theodosius I, with co-emperors Gratian and Valentinian II, declare their wish that all Roman citizens convert to trinitarian Christianity, in accordance with the patriarchs of Rome and Alexandria, implicitly rejecting the Arianism of the patriarch of Constantinople as heretical.
- Battle of Thessalonica: The Goths under Fritigern defeat a Roman army in Macedonia. Theodosius I retreats to Thessalonica and leaves Gratian in control of the Western Roman Empire.
- Rome's enemies (the Germans, Sarmatians and Huns) are taken into Imperial service; as a consequence, barbarian leaders begin to play an increasingly active role in the Roman Empire.
- November 24 – Theodosius I makes his adventus, or formal entry, into Constantinople.
- Queen Mavia, with her Saracen forces, defeats the Roman army in southern Syria.
- Emperor Theodosius I is baptized.

==== Europe ====
- The Visigothic chieftain Fritigern dies after ravaging the Balkans; his rival Athanaric becomes king of the entire Gothic nation.

==== India ====
- The annexation of western provinces by Chandragupta II gives him commerce with Europe and Egypt.

==== Pacific ====
- Easter Island, in the south Pacific Ocean, has been occupied by Neolithic seafarers under Hotu Matu'a ("supreme chief"), who about this time begin to fortify the island.

=== By topic ===
==== Arts and sciences ====
- Important works on mathematics and astronomy are written in Sanskrit.

==== Religion ====
- Ticonius writes a commentary on the Bible's Book of Revelation.
- A cathedral is built in Augusta Treverorum.
- The Council of Saragossa is held; Spanish and Aquitanian bishops condemn the teachings of Priscillianism.

=== By place ===
==== Roman Empire ====
- Emperor Gratian moves the capital to Mediolanum (modern-day Milan). Because of his Christian beliefs, he eliminates Pontifex Maximus as Imperial title. Gratian also refuses the robe of office, insulting the pagan aristocrats of Rome.
- The Gallic city of Cularo is renamed Gratianopolis (later Grenoble), in honor of Gratian having created a bishopric.

==== Europe ====
- The Visigothic chieftain Athanaric becomes the first foreign king to visit the Eastern Roman capital of Constantinople. He negotiates a peace treaty with emperor Theodosius I that makes his people foederati as "one body within the imperial soldiery". Athanaric dies 2 weeks later after an 18-year reign in which he has been undisputed king of all the Goths for just 1 year. The peace will continue until Theodosius's death in 395.
- The Sciri together with the Huns attack along Rome's lower Danubian frontier.

=== By topic ===
==== Religion ====
- First Council of Constantinople (some authorities date this council to 383): Theodosius I calls a general council to affirm and extend the Nicene Creed, and denounce Arianism and Apollinarism. Most trinitarian churches consider this an Ecumenical council.
- Council of Aquileia: Ambrose and the council depose the Arian bishops Palladius of Ratiaria and Secundianus of Singidunum.
- Flavian succeeds Meletius as Patriarch of Antioch.
- Timothy succeeds Peter II as Patriarch of Alexandria.
- Nectarius succeeds Gregory Nazianzus as Archbishop of Constantinople.
- John Chrysostom becomes a deacon.

=== By place ===
==== Roman Empire ====
- October 3 – Emperor Theodosius I commands his general Saturninus to conclude a peace treaty with the Visigoths, allowing them to settle south of the Danube. They are installed as foederati in Moesia and Thrace with the title of "Allies of the Roman People", in exchange for furnishing a contingent of auxiliary troops to defend the borders.
- Emperor Gratian refuses the divine attributes of the Imperial cult and removes the Altar of Victory from the Senate.

=== By topic ===
==== Religion ====
- The Council of Rome establishes Biblical canon in the Catholic Church. Pope Damasus I commissions a revision of the Vetus Latina, eventually resulting in the Vulgate of Jerome.
- The same council adopts Trinitarianism as doctrine, condemning Apollinarism. Theodosius I orders the death of members of the Manichaean monks.
- The first sermons declaring the virginity of Mary are given by John Chrysostom.

=== By place ===
==== Britannia ====
- Niall of the Nine Hostages becomes the first High King of Ireland.
- Magnus Maximus withdraws Roman troops from the region of Wales, marking the effective end of Roman rule in Wales.

==== Roman Empire ====
- January 19 – Arcadius is elevated to Emperor.
- Roman troops in Britannia proclaim Magnus Maximus as their Emperor. He crosses over to the continent and makes Trier his capital. Gaul, the Italian provinces and Hispania proclaim loyalty to him.
- August 25 – Emperor Gratian, age 24, is assassinated at Lugdunum (modern-day Lyon), leaving a young widow Laeta. Pannonia and Africa maintain their allegiance to co-emperor Valentinian II, now 12, whose mother, Justina, rules in his name.
- Emperor Theodosius I cedes Dacia and Macedonia to Valentinian II. They recognize Magnus Maximus as Augustus.
- Theodosius I sends Flavius Stilicho as an envoy to the Persian court of King Shapur III at Ctesiphon, to negotiate a peace settlement relating to the partition of Armenia.

==== Asia ====
- Battle of Fei River (Feishui): Former Qin forces are defeated by the numerically inferior Eastern Jin army in Anhui, preserving the Jin state in the south and precipitating the destruction of Former Qin in the north.
- King Ardashir II dies after a 4-year reign. He is succeeded by his son Shapur III.

=== By topic ===
==== Religion ====
- First Council of Constantinople (some authorities date this council to 381): Theodosius I calls a general council to affirm and extend the Nicene Creed, and denounce Arianism and Apollinarism. Most trinitarian Christian churches consider this an Ecumenical council.
- By the order of Theodosius I, Eunomius of Cyzicus is banished to Moesia.

=== By place ===
==== Roman Empire ====
- Magnus Maximus elevates his son Flavius Victor to the rank of Augustus.
- Magnus Maximus returns to Britain to aid the Roman army with the barbarian raids triggered by Maximus' withdrawal of troops to the continent.
- The Forum of Theodosius ("Forum of the Bull") is built in Constantinople.
- Quintus Aurelius Symmachus becomes urban prefect of Rome.
- An edict of Theodosius I closes pagan temples in the Nile Valley (Egypt).
- Stilicho marries Serena, adopted niece of Theodosius I.

==== Persia ====
- King Shapur III signs the Peace of Acilisene with Theodosius I. Armenia is divided in two kingdoms and becomes a vassal state of the Roman Empire and Persia. The friendly relations survive for 36 years.

==== Asia ====
- King Chimnyu ascends to the throne of Baekje (Korea); he welcomes the Indian Buddhist monk Marananta into his palace, and later declares Buddhism the official religion.
- Gogugyang becomes ruler of the Korean kingdom of Goguryeo.

==== China ====
- Following Former Qin's defeat at the Battle of Fei River, Murong Chui, Murong Hong, and Yao Chang declares themselves emperors of Later Yan, Western Yan, and Later Qin respectively, precipitating the disintegration of Former Qin.

=== By topic ===
==== Religion ====
- December 17 – Pope Siricius succeeds Damasus I as the 38th pope. He takes the title Pontifex Maximus, after it is relinquished by the late emperor Gratian.
- Jerome, Christian prophet, writes his celebrated letter "De custodia virginitatis" (vow of virginity) to Eustochium, daughter of the ascetic Paula. He has by this time completed his Vulgate translation of the Gospels.
- Ambrosius refuses the request of Empress Justina for a church in Milan, where she can worship according to her Arian belief.
- A synod is held in Bordeaux (France).
- The Gallaeci or Gallic woman Egeria concludes her Christian pilgrimage to the Holy Land at about this date; her narrative of it, the Itinerarium Egeriae, may be the earliest surviving formal writing by a woman in western European culture.

=== By place ===
==== Roman Empire ====
- The Roman synod exiles the prophet Jerome, who has incorporated ideas first propounded by the Roman statesman Cicero. He departs for Egypt, Bethlehem, and Jerusalem, accompanied by the Christian ascetic Paula, who will edit Jerome's translation of the Bible, which becomes the Latin Vulgate.

==== Asia ====
- Jinsa of Baekje becomes the 16th king of the ancient Korean kingdom of Baekje.

=== By topic ===
==== Arts and Sciences ====
- Ammianus Marcellinus begins writing a history, in the style of Tacitus, covering the years AD 96–378.

==== Religion ====
- The Serapeum of Alexandria, one of the largest Greek temples in Egypt, is destroyed by a Christian mob. The precise date is disputed, with 391 sometimes given as the moment of final destruction.
- Theophilus becomes Patriarch of Alexandria.
- Pope Siricius issues the Directa Decretal, proclaiming the primacy of Rome and the priestly obligation of celibacy.
- Priscillian, Spanish bishop, is accused of Manichaeism and magic, and beheaded at Trier . He becomes the first person in the history of Christianity to be executed for heresy.

==== Sport in the Roman Empire ====
- Aurelios Zopyros becomes the last reported athlete at the Ancient Olympic Games. He is a victor in "junior boxing" (pankration).

=== By place ===
==== Roman Empire ====
- Emperor Theodosius I signs a peace treaty with King Shapur III; they divide Armenia into two kingdoms (vassal states). The treaty establishes friendly relations between the Roman Empire and Persia for the next 36 years.
- The Greuthungi cross the Danube to raid the Roman garrisons on the northern frontier. They are met midstream by a well-armed fleet, and their rafts and dugouts sink. Those not drowned are slaughtered.
- Magnus Maximus invades Italy; he destroys Novara for supporting his rival Valentinian II.
- Theodosius I begins to rebuild the present-day Basilica of Saint Paul Outside the Walls.
- A column is constructed at Constantinople in honour of Theodosius I. Reliefs depict the emperor's victory over the barbarians in the Balkan.

==== Asia ====
- The Northern Wei Dynasty begins in China. The Tuoba clan of the Xianbei tribe (proto-Mongol people) is politically separated from the Chinese dynasties established in Jiankang (modern Nanjing). The Northern Wei rulers are ardent supporters of Buddhism. Prince Dao Wu Di, age 15, becomes the first emperor (see Northern dynasties).

=== By topic ===
==== Religion ====
- Saint Ambrose defends the rights of the Catholic Church with respect to those of the State.
- John Chrysostom becomes a presbyter; he also writes eight Homilies entitled "Adversus Iudaeos" ("Against the Jews").
- Augustine converts to Christianity. He ends his marriage plans after hearing a sermon on the life of Saint Anthony.
- The fight in the Roman Empire against anti-pagan laws becomes increasingly futile.
- Sumela Monastery is established in Asia Minor.

=== By place ===
==== Roman Empire ====
- Spring – Emperor Theodosius I increases the taxes in Antioch. A peasant uprising leads to a riot, and public buildings are set afire. Theodosius sends imperial troops to quell the disturbance, and closes the public baths and theatres.
- Magnus Maximus, usurping emperor of the West, invades Italy. Emperor Valentinian II, age 16, is forced out of Rome. He flees with his mother Justina and sisters to Thessaloniki (Thrace).
- Winter – The widowed emperor Theodosius I takes Valentinian II under his protection, and marries his sister Flavia Galla.

==== Persia ====
- Peace of Acilisene: King Shapur III signs a treaty with Theodosius I. Armenia is divided in two kingdoms, and becomes a vassal state of the Roman Empire and Persia.

=== By topic ===
==== Art and Science ====
- Oribase, Greek doctor, publishes a treatise on paralysis and bleedings.

==== Religion ====
- Augustine is baptized on Easter Vigil by Saint Ambrose, Bishop of Milan.

=== By place ===
==== Roman Empire ====
- Battle of the Save: Emperor Theodosius I defeats Magnus Maximus near Emona (modern Slovenia). Theodosius is in command of an army including Goths, Huns and Alans. Valentinian II, now 17, is restored as Roman Emperor.
- Frankish invasion of 388: Rebellious Franks led by Marcomer, Sunno and Genobaud invade the Roman Empire with plunder and threaten Colonia Claudia Ara Agrippinensium (Cologne). A part of the invaders are destroyed by the Romans in the charcoal forest (present-day Belgium). The Roman general Quintines pursues the invaders on Frankish soil and is ambushed. His army is surrounded and defeated by the Franks.
- August 28 – Magnus Maximus surrenders at Aquileia, and is executed. Theodosius I devotes himself to gluttony and voluptuous living. Maximus' son Flavius Victor is executed at Trier, by Valentinian's magister militum Arbogast.

==== Persia ====
- King Shapur III dies after a reign in which he has partitioned Armenia with the Roman Empire. He is succeeded by his son Bahram IV, who becomes the twelfth Sassanid king of Persia.

==== India ====
- Emperor Chandragupta II, ruler of the Gupta Empire, begins a war against the Shaka Dynasty in West India.

=== By topic ===
==== Religion ====
- Paternus becomes bishop of the Episcopal see of Braga (Portugal).
- Isaac, age 50, is named Catholicos (spiritual head) of the Armenian Apostolic Church.
- Jerome moves to Palestine, where he spends the rest of his life as a hermit near Bethlehem.
- A group of Christians storms the synagogue of the city Callinicum (Syria), at the Euphrates.

=== By place ===
==== Roman Empire ====
- All pagan buildings in Alexandria, including the library, are destroyed by fire.

== Births ==
380

- Aelia Eudoxia, empress and wife of Arcadius (approximate date)
- Alexius, Eastern saint (approximate date)
- Eucherius, bishop of Lyon (approximate date)
- Eutyches, presbyter and archimandrite (approximate date)
- Hephaestion of Thebes, Egyptian astrologer (approximate date)
- Kālidāsa, Classical Sanskrit writer (approximate date)
- Olympiodorus of Thebes, historical writer (approximate date)
- Peter Chrysologus, bishop of Ravenna (approximate date)
- Philip of Side, Christian church historian (approximate date)
- Socrates of Constantinople, church historian (approximate date)

381

- Helian Bobo, Chinese emperor of the Xiongnu state Xia (d. 425)

382

- Jin Andi, emperor of the Eastern Jin Dynasty (d. 419)
- Sima Yuanxian, regent during the Jin Dynasty (d. 402)

383

- Lupus of Troyes, French bishop and saint (approximate date)

384

- September 9 – Honorius, Roman Emperor (d. 423)
- Chu Lingyuan, last empress of the Jin Dynasty (d. 436)
- Maria, empress and daughter of Stilicho (approximate date)
- Sengzhao, Chinese Buddhist philosopher (d. 414)
- Wang Shen'ai, empress of the Jin Dynasty (d. 412)

385

- Avitus, Western Roman Emperor (approximate date)
- Murong Chao, emperor of the Xianbei state Southern Yan (d. 410)
- Murong Xi, emperor of the Xianbei state Later Yan (d. 407)
- Pulcheria, daughter of Theodosius I who died in infancy (d. 386)
- Saint Patrick, missionary in Ireland (approximate date)
- Paulus Orosius, historian and theologian (approximate date)
- Xie Lingyun, Chinese poet of the Southern and Northern Dynasties (d. 433)

386

- Jin Gongdi, last emperor of the Jin Dynasty (d. 421)
- Nestorius, founder of Nestorianism (approximate date)

387

- Vardan Mamikonian, Armenian military leader (d. 451)

388

- Elpidius of Atella (or Elpidio), Christian bishop (d. 452)
- Yao Hong, Chinese emperor of the Qiang-led Later Qin state (d. 417)

389

- Geiseric, king of the Vandals and Alans (approximate date)

== Deaths ==
380

- April 10 – James, Azadanus and Abdicius, Roman Catholic priests, martyrs and saints

=== Date unknown ===
- Fritigern, king of the Visigoths
- Samudragupta, ruler of the Gupta Empire
- Wang Fahui, empress of the Jin dynasty (b. 360)

381

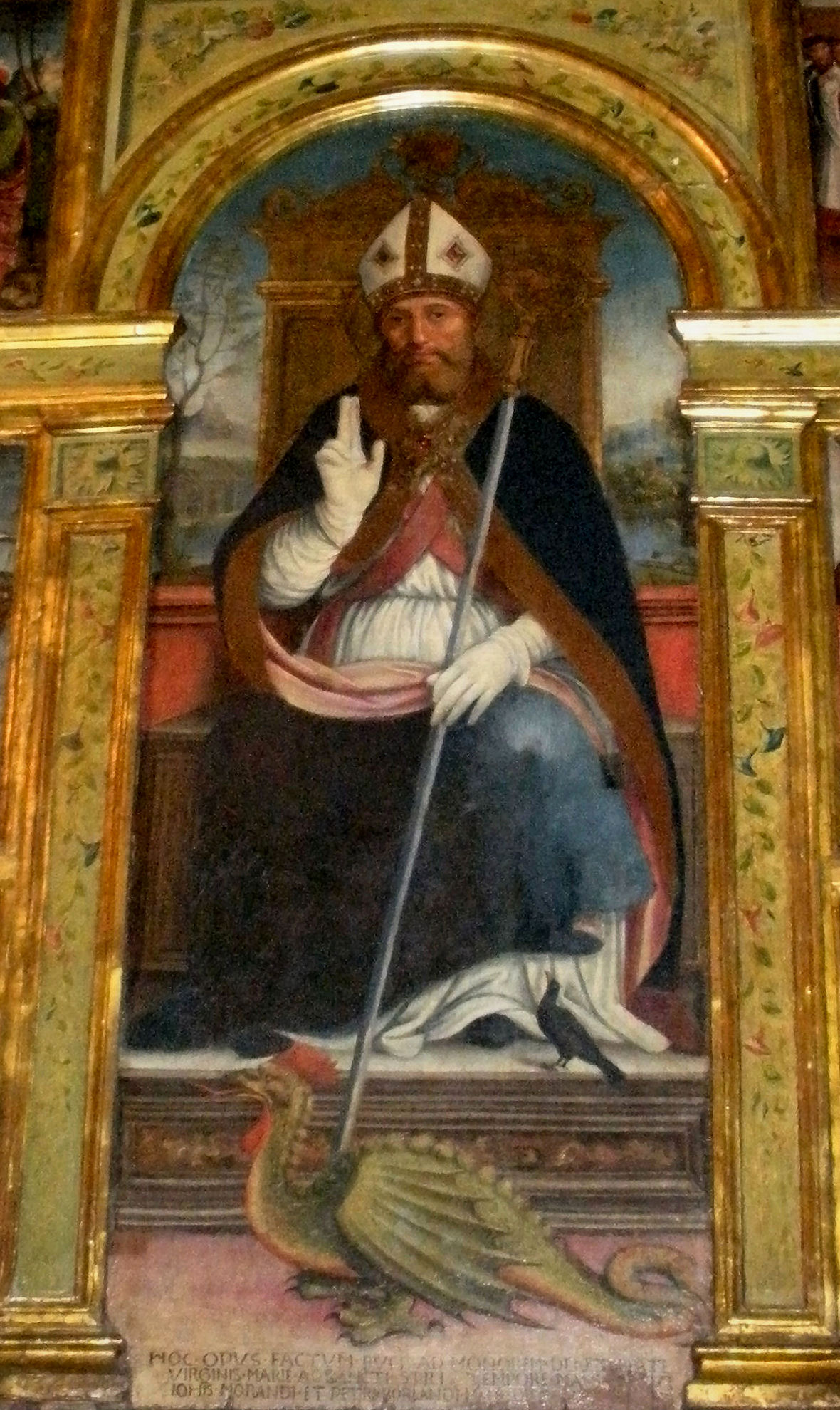
Saint Syrus of Genoa

- February 15 – Faustinus of Brescia, Roman Catholic bishop and saint
- February 27 – Peter II, Patriarch of Alexandria
- June 29 – Saint Syrus, Bishop of Genoa

=== Date unknown ===
- Athanaric, king of the Visigoths
- Saint Meletius, Patriarch of Antioch

382

- Apollinaris the Younger, bishop of Laodicea in Syria.

383

- May 30 – Isaac of Dalmatia, Byzantine Orthodox priest and saint
- August 25 – Gratian, Roman Emperor (assassinated) (b. 359)
- October 21 – Ursula, Roman Christian martyr and saint
- Ardashir II, Sassanid king (shah) ("King of Kings")
- Flavia Maxima Constantia, daughter of Constantius II
- Frumentius, Phoenician missionary and bishop
- Fu Rong, Chinese general and prime minister
- Ulfilas (or Wulfila), Gothic missionary and bishop

384

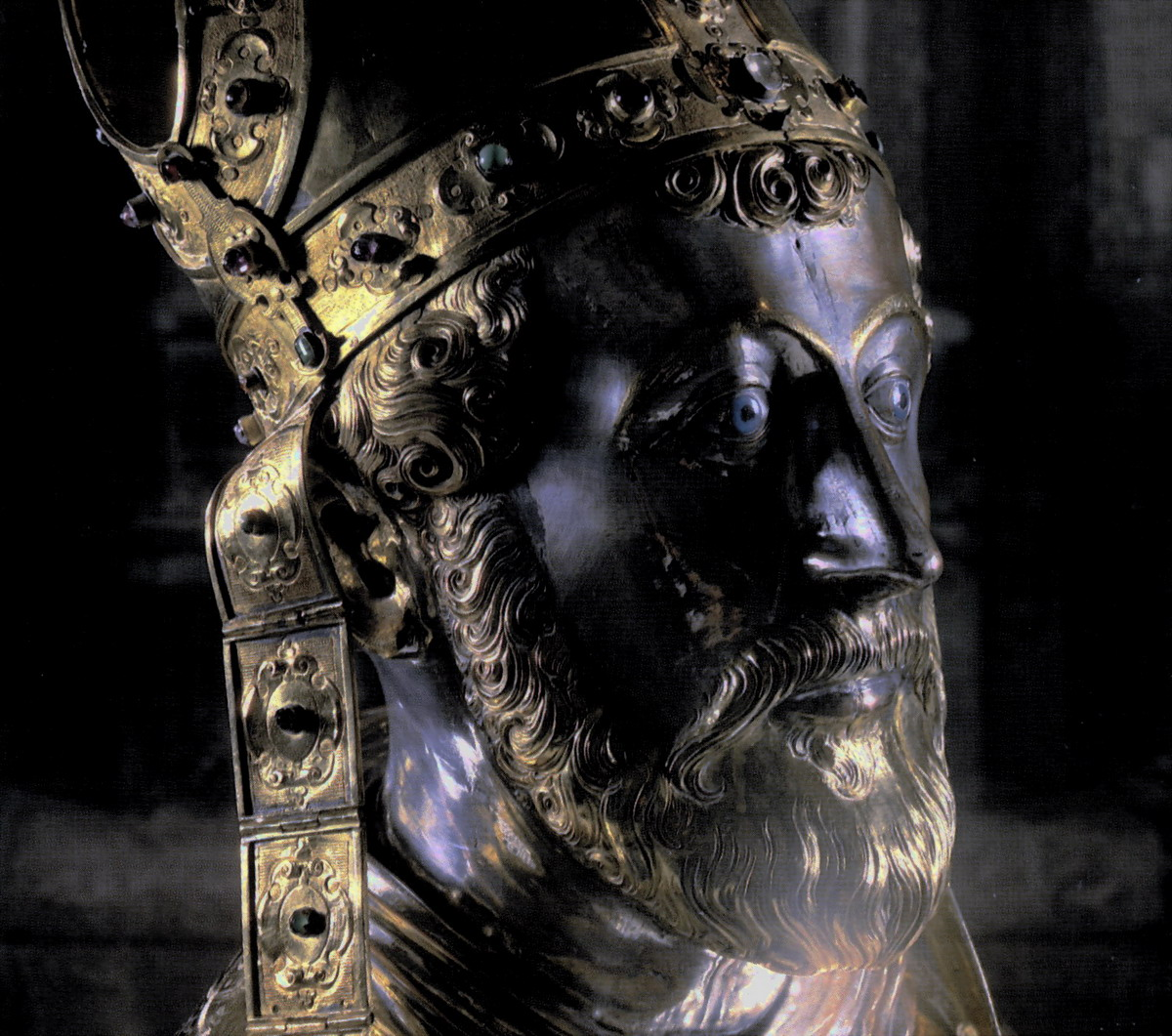
Saint Servatius of Tongeren

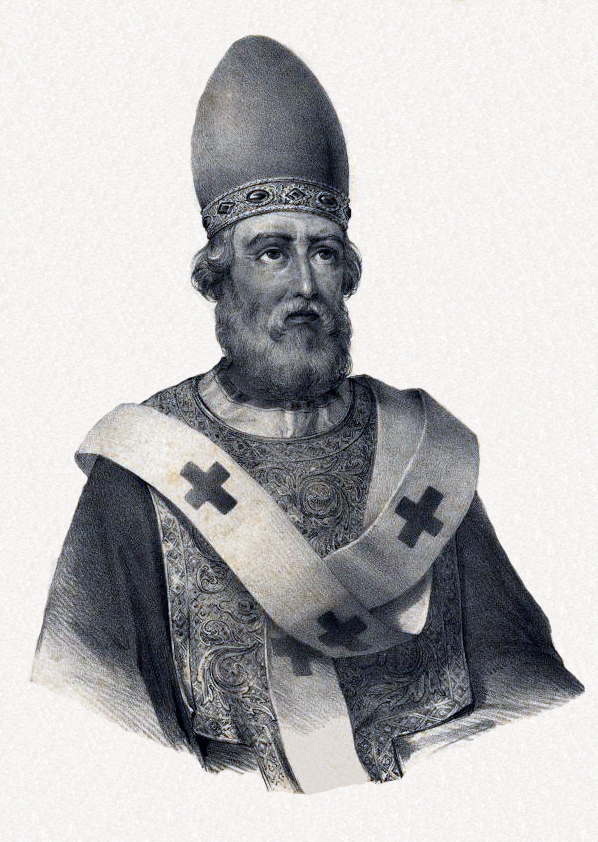
Pope Damasus I

- May 13 – Servatius of Tongeren, Roman Catholic bishop and saint
- July 20 – Pope Timothy I of Alexandria
- December 11 – Pope Damasus I

=== Date unknown ===
- Chu Suanzi, empress of the Jin Dynasty (b. 324)
- Geungusu, king of Baekje (Korea)
- Huan Chong, general and governor of the Jin Dynasty (b. 328)
- Murong Hong, founder of the Xianbei state Western Yan
- Vettius Agorius Praetextatus, praetorian prefect
- Xi Zuochi, Jin Dynasty historian

385

- October 16 – Fú Jiān, emperor of the Chinese Di state Former Qin (b. 337)
- Aelia Flaccilla, Roman empress and wife of Theodosius I (or possibly 386)
- Chimnyu, king of Baekje (Korea)
- Dao An, Buddhist monk of the Jin Dynasty (b. 312)
- Murong Wei, emperor of the Xianbei state Former Yan (b. 350)
- Priscillian, Spanish bishop and theologian
- Xie An, statesman of the Jin Dynasty (b. 320)

386

- November 23 – Jin Feidi, emperor of the Jin Dynasty (b. 342)
- Cyril of Jerusalem, theologian and saint
- Demophilus, Patriarch of Constantinople
- Duan Sui, ruler of the Western Yan
- Fu Pi, emperor of the Former Qin
- Murong Chong, emperor of the Western Yan (b. 359)
- Murong Yao, emperor of the Western Yan
- Murong Yi, ruler of the Western Yan
- Murong Zhong, emperor of the Western Yan
- Pulcheria, daughter of Theodosius I (b. 385)
- Wang Xianzhi, Chinese calligrapher (b. 344)
- Yang, empress of the Former Qin

387

- Aelia Flaccilla, Roman Empress and wife of Theodosius I
- Alatheus, chieftain of the Ostrogoths
- Saint Monica, mother of Augustine of Hippo
- Zhu Fatai, Chinese Buddhist scholar (b. 320)

388

- August 28 – Magnus Maximus, Roman emperor
- Flavius Victor, Roman co-emperor (Augustus)
- Huan Shiqian (or Zhen'e), Chinese general
- Maternus Cynegius, Roman praetorian prefect
- Qifu Guoren, Chinese ruler of the Xianbei-led Western Qin state
- Shapur III, king of the Sassanid Empire (Persia)
- Themistius, Byzantine statesman and rhetorician
- Xie Xuan (or Youdu), Chinese general (b. 343)

389

- Donatian of Reims (or Donat), Christian bishop and saint
- Florus of Lodève, Christian bishop and martyr (approximate date)
- Mao, Chinese empress and wife of Fu Deng (Former Qin)
