= 386 =

386 in various calendars
Gregorian calendar	386; CCCLXXXVI
Ab urbe condita	1139
Assyrian calendar	5136
Balinese saka calendar	307–308
Bengali calendar	−208 – −207
Berber calendar	1336
Buddhist calendar	930
Burmese calendar	−252
Byzantine calendar	5894–5895
Chinese calendar	乙酉年 (Wood Rooster); 3083 or 2876 — to — 丙戌年 (Fire Dog); 3084 or 2877
Coptic calendar	102–103
Discordian calendar	1552
Ethiopian calendar	378–379
Hebrew calendar	4146–4147
- Hindu calendars
Vikram Samvat	442–443
Shaka Samvat	307–308
Kali Yuga	3486–3487
Holocene calendar	10386
Iranian calendar	236 BP – 235 BP
Islamic calendar	243 BH – 242 BH
Javanese calendar	269–270
Julian calendar	386; CCCLXXXVI
Korean calendar	2719
Minguo calendar	1526 before ROC 民前1526年
Nanakshahi calendar	−1082
Seleucid era	697/698 AG
Thai solar calendar	928–929
Tibetan calendar	阴木鸡年 (female Wood-Rooster); 512 or 131 or −641 — to — 阳火狗年 (male Fire-Dog); 513 or 132 or −640

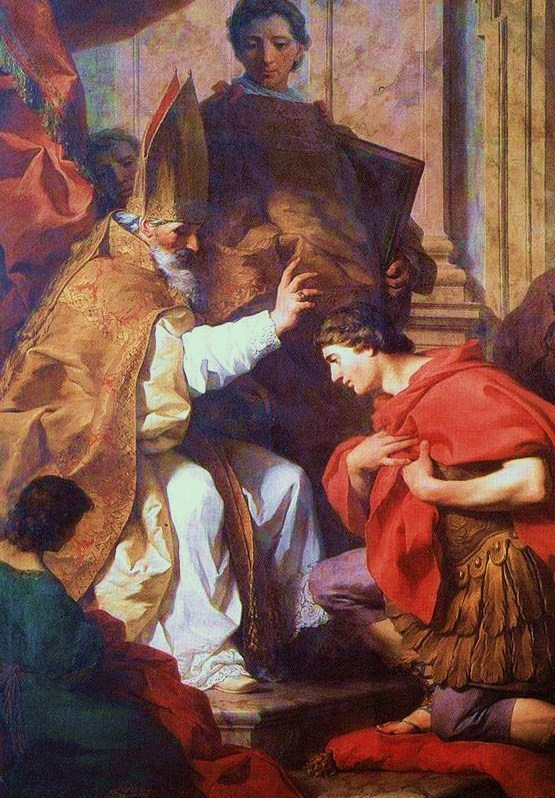
Saint Ambrose converting Theodosius I

Year 386 (CCCLXXXVI) was a common year starting on Thursday of the Julian calendar. At the time, it was known as the Year of the Consulship of Honorius and Euodius (or, less frequently, year 1139 Ab urbe condita). The denomination 386 for this year has been used since the early medieval period, when the Anno Domini calendar era became the prevalent method in Europe for naming years.

== Events ==
=== By place ===
==== Roman Empire ====
- Emperor Theodosius I signs a peace treaty with King Shapur III; they divide Armenia into two kingdoms (vassal states). The treaty establishes friendly relations between the Roman Empire and Persia for the next 36 years.
- The Greuthungi cross the Danube to raid the Roman garrisons on the northern frontier. They are met midstream by a well-armed fleet, and their rafts and dugouts sink. Those not drowned are slaughtered.
- Magnus Maximus invades Italy; he destroys Novara for supporting his rival Valentinian II.
- Theodosius I begins to rebuild the present-day Basilica of Saint Paul Outside the Walls.
- A column is constructed at Constantinople in honour of Theodosius I. Reliefs depict the emperor's victory over the barbarians in the Balkan.

==== Asia ====
- The Northern Wei Dynasty begins in China. The Tuoba clan of the Xianbei tribe (proto-Mongol people) is politically separated from the Chinese dynasties established in Jiankang (modern Nanjing). The Northern Wei rulers are ardent supporters of Buddhism. Prince Dao Wu Di, age 15, becomes the first emperor (see Northern dynasties).

=== By topic ===
==== Religion ====
- Saint Ambrose defends the rights of the Catholic Church with respect to those of the State.
- John Chrysostom becomes a presbyter; he also writes eight Homilies entitled "Adversus Iudaeos" ("Against the Jews").
- Augustine converts to Christianity. He ends his marriage plans after hearing a sermon on the life of Saint Anthony.
- The fight in the Roman Empire against anti-pagan laws becomes increasingly futile.
- Sumela Monastery is established in Asia Minor.

== Births ==
- Jin Gongdi, last emperor of the Jin Dynasty (d. 421)
- Nestorius, founder of Nestorianism (approximate date)

== Deaths ==
- November 23 – Jin Feidi, emperor of the Jin Dynasty (b. 342)
- Cyril of Jerusalem, theologian and saint
- Demophilus, Patriarch of Constantinople
- Duan Sui, ruler of the Western Yan
- Fu Pi, emperor of the Former Qin
- Murong Chong, emperor of the Western Yan (b. 359)
- Murong Yao, emperor of the Western Yan
- Murong Yi, ruler of the Western Yan
- Murong Zhong, emperor of the Western Yan
- Pulcheria, daughter of Theodosius I (b. 385)
- Wang Xianzhi, Chinese calligrapher (b. 344)
- Yang, empress of the Former Qin
