= 384 =

384 in various calendars
- Gregorian calendar: 384; CCCLXXXIV
- Ab urbe condita: 1137
- Assyrian calendar: 5134
- Balinese saka calendar: 305–306
- Bengali calendar: −210 – −209
- Berber calendar: 1334
- Buddhist calendar: 928
- Burmese calendar: −254
- Byzantine calendar: 5892–5893
- Chinese calendar: 癸未年 (Water Goat); 3081 or 2874 — to — 甲申年 (Wood Monkey); 3082 or 2875
- Coptic calendar: 100–101
- Discordian calendar: 1550
- Ethiopian calendar: 376–377
- Hebrew calendar: 4144–4145
- Hindu calendars
- Vikram Samvat: 440–441
- Shaka Samvat: 305–306
- Kali Yuga: 3484–3485
- Holocene calendar: 10384
- Iranian calendar: 238 BP – 237 BP
- Islamic calendar: 245 BH – 244 BH
- Javanese calendar: 267–268
- Julian calendar: 384; CCCLXXXIV
- Korean calendar: 2717
- Minguo calendar: 1528 before ROC 民前1528年
- Nanakshahi calendar: −1084
- Seleucid era: 695/696 AG
- Thai solar calendar: 926–927
- Tibetan calendar: ཆུ་མོ་ལུག་ལོ་ (female Water-Sheep); 510 or 129 or −643 — to — ཤིང་ཕོ་སྤྲེ་ལོ་ (male Wood-Monkey); 511 or 130 or −642

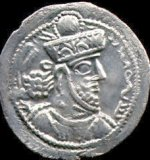
King Shapur III of Persia

Year 384 (CCCLXXXIV) was a leap year starting on Monday of the Julian calendar. At the time, it was known as the Year of the Consulship of Ricomer and Clearchus (or, less frequently, year 1137 Ab urbe condita). The denomination 384 for this year has been used since the early medieval period, when the Anno Domini calendar era became the prevalent method in Europe for giving names to years.

== Events ==
=== By place ===
==== Roman Empire ====
- Magnus Maximus elevates his son Flavius Victor to the rank of Augustus.
- Magnus Maximus returns to Britain to aid the Roman army with the barbarian raids triggered by Maximus' withdrawal of troops to the continent.
- The Forum of Theodosius ("Forum of the Bull") is built in Constantinople.
- Quintus Aurelius Symmachus becomes urban prefect of Rome.
- An edict of Theodosius I closes pagan temples in the Nile Valley (Egypt).
- Stilicho marries Serena, adopted niece of Theodosius I.

==== Persia ====
- King Shapur III signs the Peace of Acilisene with Theodosius I. Armenia is divided in two kingdoms and becomes a vassal state of the Roman Empire and Persia. The friendly relations survive for 36 years.

==== Asia ====
- King Chimnyu ascends to the throne of Baekje (Korea); he welcomes the Indian Buddhist monk Marananta into his palace, and later declares Buddhism the official religion.
- Gogugyang becomes ruler of the Korean kingdom of Goguryeo.

==== China ====
- Following Former Qin's defeat at the Battle of Fei River, Murong Chui, Murong Hong, and Yao Chang declares themselves emperors of Later Yan, Western Yan, and Later Qin respectively, precipitating the disintegration of Former Qin.

=== By topic ===
==== Religion ====
- December 17 – Pope Siricius succeeds Damasus I as the 38th pope. He takes the title Pontifex Maximus, after it is relinquished by the late emperor Gratian.
- Jerome, Christian prophet, writes his celebrated letter "De custodia virginitatis" (vow of virginity) to Eustochium, daughter of the ascetic Paula. He has by this time completed his Vulgate translation of the Gospels.
- Ambrosius refuses the request of Empress Justina for a church in Milan, where she can worship according to her Arian belief.
- A synod is held in Bordeaux (France).
- The Gallaeci or Gallic woman Egeria concludes her Christian pilgrimage to the Holy Land at about this date; her narrative of it, the Itinerarium Egeriae, may be the earliest surviving formal writing by a woman in western European culture.

== Births ==
- September 9 – Honorius, Roman Emperor (d. 423)
- Chu Lingyuan, last empress of the Jin Dynasty (d. 436)
- Maria, empress and daughter of Stilicho (approximate date)
- Sengzhao, Chinese Buddhist philosopher (d. 414)
- Wang Shen'ai, empress of the Jin Dynasty (d. 412)

== Deaths ==
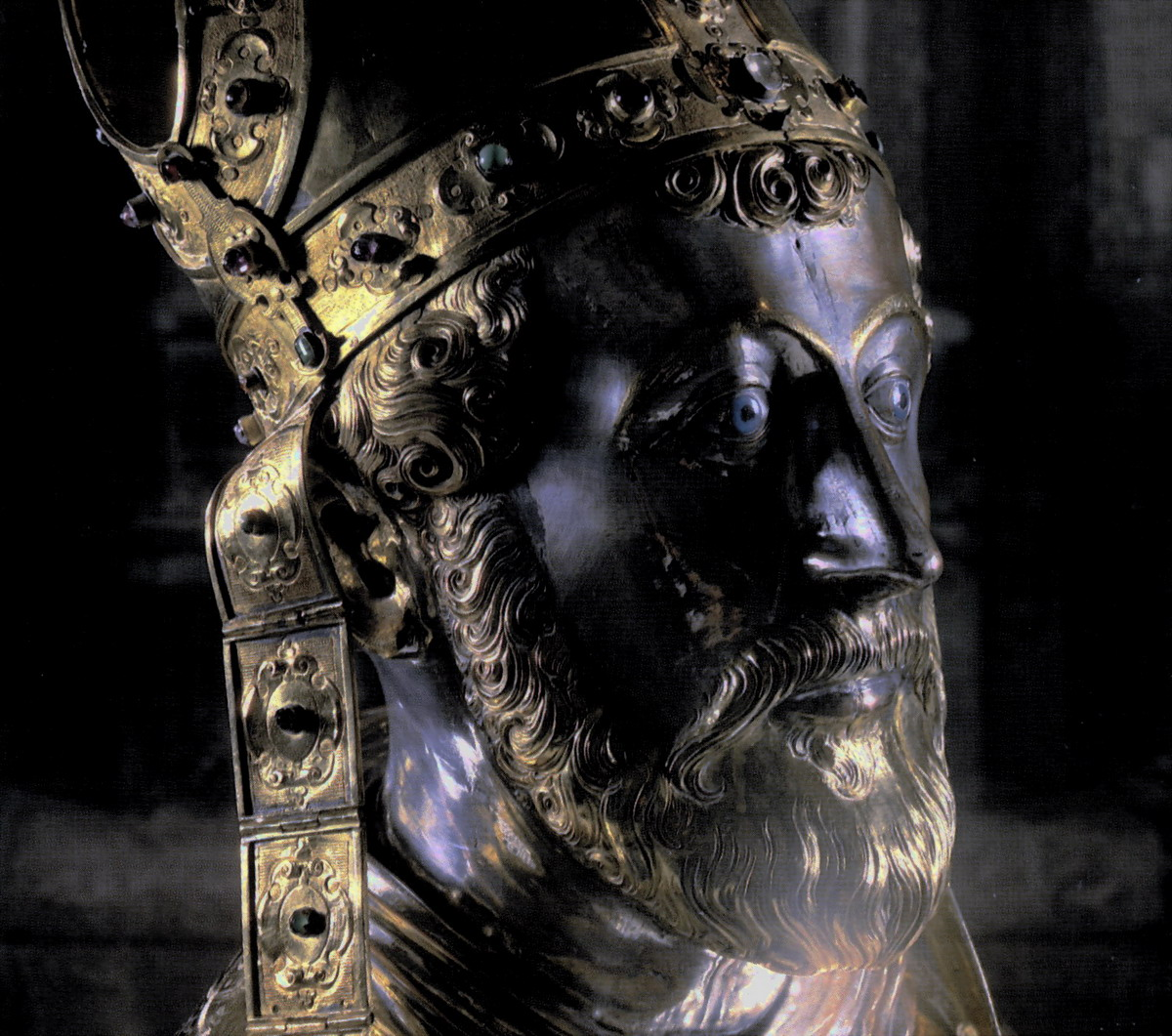
Saint Servatius of Tongeren

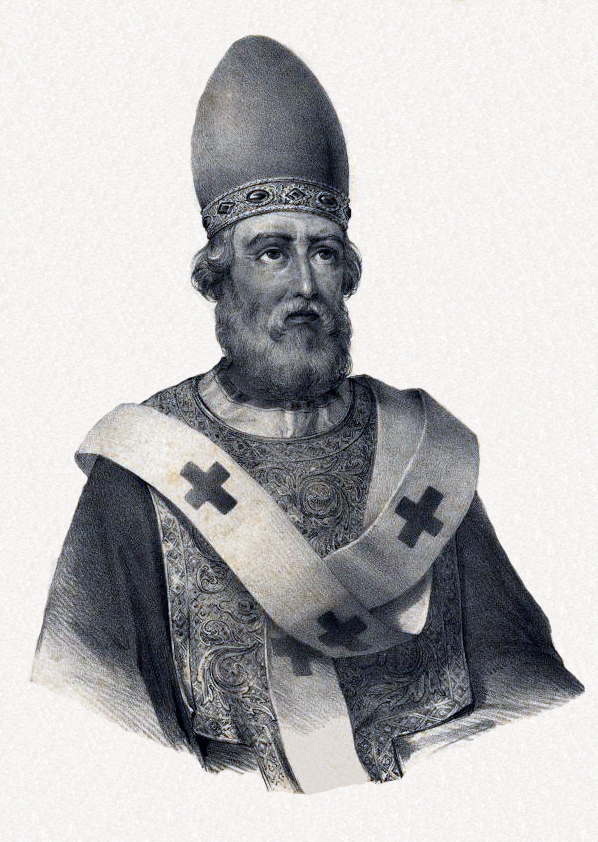
Pope Damasus I

- May 13 – Servatius of Tongeren, Roman Catholic bishop and saint
- July 20 – Pope Timothy I of Alexandria
- December 11 – Pope Damasus I

=== Date unknown ===
- Chu Suanzi, empress of the Jin Dynasty (b. 324)
- Geungusu, king of Baekje (Korea)
- Huan Chong, general and governor of the Jin Dynasty (b. 328)
- Murong Hong, founder of the Xianbei state Western Yan
- Vettius Agorius Praetextatus, praetorian prefect
- Xi Zuochi, Jin Dynasty historian
