= 414 (disambiguation) =

414 may refer to:

- 414 (number)

== Dates ==
- 414 CE (CDXIV), a year in the Western calendar, "A.D. 414"
- 414 BC, a year in the Western calendar, "414 BCE"

== Places ==
- 414 Liriope (asteroid 414), main belt asteroid
- Route 414, see List of highways numbered 414
- Area code 414
- 414 (Mexico City Metrobús), a BRT station in Mexico City

== Computing ==
- The 414s, a group of hackers
- HTTP 414, WWW status code

== Aviation ==
- Cessna 414 Chancellor, a pressurized light-twin-prop sub-10 passenger plane.
- Breguet 414, interwar bomber of France

== See also ==
- 414th (disambiguation)
- 414th (disambiguation)
- 1.414
- Gum arabic (E414) food additive
- Tan-Sahsa Flight 414
