= 414th =

414th may refer to:

- 414th Bombardment Squadron, inactive United States Air Force unit
- 414th Combat Training Squadron, United States Air Force unit
- 414th Fighter Group (414th FG), active United States Air Force unit
- 414th Infantry Regiment (United States), currently a Drill Sergeant Unit headquartered in Eugene, Oregon

== Other uses ==
- No. 414 Squadron RCAF, Canadian Forces, Royal Canadian Air Force
- 414 Panzer Battalion, German-Dutch tank battalion

== 414 vehicles ==
- Russian submarine Daniil Moskovsky (B-414)
- German submarine U-414
- USS Springer (SS-414)
- USS Russell (DD-414)
- HM LST-414

== See also ==
- 414 (disambiguation)
  - 414 (number)
  - 414, the year 414 (CDXIV) of the Julian calendar
  - 414 BC
