= Murong Yong =

Murong Yong 慕容永

Ruler of Western Yan
- Reign: 386–394
- Predecessor: Murong Zhong
- Died: 394
Full name
- Family name: Mùróng (慕容); Given name: Yǒng (永)
Era name and dates
- Zhōngxīng (中興): 386–394
- Dynasty: Western Yan

Murong Yong (Chinese: 慕容永; died 394), courtesy name Shuming (叔明), was the last emperor of the Xianbei-led Chinese Western Yan dynasty. He was the grandson of Murong Yun (慕容運), the uncle of Former Yan's founder Murong Huang. As a member of Former Yan's imperial clan, he was moved to Guanzhong, Former Qin's capital region, when Former Qin destroyed Former Yan in 370. He was described as poor, and he and his wife made their living by selling boots.

Murong Yong apparently became a Western Yan general in 384, when its first two rulers Murong Hong and Murong Chong rose against Former Qin. The first actual historical reference to his actions, however, was in 386, when, after Murong Chong was assassinated by the general Han Yan (韓延) and replaced by Duan Sui, Murong Yong and another general, Murong Heng (慕容恆), jointly attacked Duan Sui and killed him, replacing him with Murong Yi. The Xianbei people then abandoned Chang'an, formerly Former Qin's capital, and headed east back toward their homeland. Later that month, however, after Murong Heng's brother Murong Tao (慕容韜) killed Murong Yi, and Murong Heng supported Murong Chong's son Murong Yao to replace Murong Yi, Murong Yong, along with another general Diao Yun (刁雲), attacked Murong Tao, forcing him to flee to Murong Heng. Later that month, Murong Yong killed Murong Yao and replaced him with Murong Hong's son Murong Zhong.

Three months later, however, Diao killed Murong Zhong and supported Murong Yong to replace him. Murong Yong claimed the title of Prince of Hedong and sought to be a vassal of the Later Yan emperor Murong Chui. He also tried to negotiate with the Former Qin emperor Fu Pi, asking Fu Pi to allow him a path back east, but Fu Pi refused and tried to intercept Western Yan forces. Murong Yong defeated Fu Pi, killing his prime minister Wang Yong (王永) and general Juqu Jushizi (沮渠俱石子), and while Fu Pi fled, Murong Yong captured most of his officials and his wife Empress Yang. Fu Pi soon died at the hands of the Jin general Feng Gai (馮該).

Murong Yong took over Fu Pi's territory (roughly modern central and southern Shanxi), establishing a capital at Zhangzi (長子, in modern Changzhi, Shanxi). He also claimed imperial title, thus signifying a break with Murong Chui. He was ready to make Fu Pi's Empress Yang a concubine, but she tried to stab him with a sword, and he killed her. In fear of their lives, Murong Chui's son Murong Rou (慕容柔) and grandsons Murong Sheng and Murong Hui, who had been part of Western Yan's exodus, escaped and fled to Later Yan's capital Zhongshan (中山, in modern Baoding, Hebei), perhaps with good reason, for Murong Yong, in 387 or 388, ordered that all descendants of Murong Chui or the Former Yan emperor Murong Jun be slaughtered.

Murong Yong, once he settled in Zhangzi, carried out few military campaigns and appeared to be content with his domain. In 387, he did briefly engage Later Qin's emperor Yao Chang in battle, but did not seriously attack Yao. In 390, he headed for the Jin city of Luoyang, but the Jin general Zhu Xu (朱序) defeated him, and he withdrew. He attacked Luoyang again in 391 but was again repelled by Jin forces.

In 392, the Dingling chief Zhai Zhao, whose father Zhai Liao had years earlier rebelled against Later Yan and claimed the title "Heavenly King" (Tian Wang) and established a Wei state, was besieged by Murong Chui in his capital Huatai (滑台, in modern Anyang, Henan), and sought aid from Murong Yong. Murong Yong, wanting to let Murong Chui and Zhai Zhao wear each other out—not realizing that Murong Chui, being far stronger than Zhai Zhao, could crush Zhai Zhao easily—refused to go to Zhai Zhao's aid, and Murong Chui conquered Wei lands easily. Zhai Zhao fled to Western Yan and was created a prince, but a year later, suspecting Zhai of treason, Murong Yong killed Zhai.

In 393, Murong Chui, under advice of his brother Murong De, decided to attack Murong Yong to end any doubt about the Yan succession. In early 394, he got his forces ready in battle posture, but did not attack for several months. Murong Yong thought Murong Chui was trying for a trick attack and tried to anticipate it, but Murong Chui then attacked by three different routes, leading the main army heading for Zhangzi. Murong Yong personally engaged Murong Chui but was defeated, and he fled back to Zhangzi to try to defend the city. He also sought emergency aid from Jin and Northern Wei, but before Jin and Northern Wei forces could arrive, Zhangzi fell, and Murong Chui captured and executed Murong Yong. Western Yan was at its end, and its territory was annexed to Later Yan.

== Personal Information ==
=== Sons ===
- Murong Liang (慕容亮), Crown Prince
- Murong Hong (慕容弘), Duke of Changshan

Both his sons died in 394, presumably killed along with him.

Prince of (Western) Yan House of Murong Died: 394
Chinese royalty
| Preceded by Murong Zhong | Prince of Yan; 386–394 | Merged in the Crown |
Titles in pretence
| Preceded by Murong Zhong | — TITULAR — Emperor of China; 386–394; Reason for succession failure: Annexed by Later Yan | Succeeded by Murong Chui |
| Preceded by Fu Pi | — TITULAR — Emperor of China; 386–394; Reason for succession failure: Annexed by Later Yan | Succeeded by Murong Chui |
