= 386 (disambiguation) =

386 is a year in the Julian calendar.

386 may also refer to:

- the number 386
- The i386 microprocessor
- The Am386 microprocessor

== See also ==
- 386th (disambiguation)
