= 386th Division =

386th Division may refer to:

- 386th Motorized Division, Wehrmacht, Germany
- 386th Rifle Division, Soviet Union

== See also ==
- List of military divisions by number
- 386th (disambiguation)
