= Jianping =

Jianping may refer to:

== Locations ==
- Jianping County, a county in Liaoning, China
- Jianping, Jianping County, a town in Jianping County
- Jianping, Anhui, a town in Langxi County, Anhui, China
- Jianping, Sichuan, a town in Santai County, Sichuan, China
- Jianping Township, a township in Wushan County, Chongqing, China

== Historical eras ==
- Jianping (6BC–3BC), era name used by Emperor Ai of Han
- Jianping (330–333), era name used by Shi Le, emperor of Later Zhao
- Jianping (386), era name used by Murong Yao, emperor of Western Yan
- Jianping (398), era name used by Murong Sheng, emperor of Later Yan
- Jianping (400–405), era name used by Murong De, emperor of Southern Yan
