= 322 (disambiguation) =

322 is a year on the Julian Calendar.

322 may also refer to:

- 322 BC, a year of the pre-Julian Roman calendar
- 322 (film), Slovak film by director Dušan Hanák
- 322 (number)
- 322 Phaeo, an asteroid
- Plimpton 322, a Babylonian tablet
- U.S. Route 322, an east–west highway traversing Ohio, Pennsylvania, and New Jersey
- Skull and Bones or Order 322, a secret student society at Yale University in New Haven, Connecticut
