= 414th Regiment =

414th Regiment may refer to:

- 414th Infantry Regiment, United States
- 414th (Forth) Coast Regiment, Royal Artillery

== See also ==
- 414th (disambiguation)
