= Jianwu =

Jianwu (建武) was a Chinese era name used by several emperors of China. It may refer to:

- Jianwu (25–56), era name used by Emperor Guangwu of Han
- Jianwu (304), era name used by Emperor Hui of Jin
- Jianwu (317–318), era name used by Emperor Yuan of Jin
- Jianwu (335–348), era name used by Shi Hu, emperor of Later Zhao
- Jianwu (386), era name used by Murong Zhong, emperor of Western Yan
- Jianwu (494–498), era name used by Emperor Ming of Southern Qi
- Jianwu (529), era name used by Yuan Hao, self-proclaimed ruler of Northern Wei

== See also ==
- Sword dance, known in Chinese as Jianwu (剑舞; 劍舞)
