= 359 =

359 in various calendars
Gregorian calendar	359; CCCLIX
Ab urbe condita	1112
Assyrian calendar	5109
Balinese saka calendar	280–281
Bengali calendar	−235 – −234
Berber calendar	1309
Buddhist calendar	903
Burmese calendar	−279
Byzantine calendar	5867–5868
Chinese calendar	戊午年 (Earth Horse); 3056 or 2849 — to — 己未年 (Earth Goat); 3057 or 2850
Coptic calendar	75–76
Discordian calendar	1525
Ethiopian calendar	351–352
Hebrew calendar	4119–4120
- Hindu calendars
Vikram Samvat	415–416
Shaka Samvat	280–281
Kali Yuga	3459–3460
Holocene calendar	10359
Iranian calendar	263 BP – 262 BP
Islamic calendar	271 BH – 270 BH
Javanese calendar	241–242
Julian calendar	359; CCCLIX
Korean calendar	2692
Minguo calendar	1553 before ROC 民前1553年
Nanakshahi calendar	−1109
Seleucid era	670/671 AG
Thai solar calendar	901–902
Tibetan calendar	ས་ཕོ་རྟ་ལོ་ (male Earth-Horse); 485 or 104 or −668 — to — ས་མོ་ལུག་ལོ་ (female Earth-Sheep); 486 or 105 or −667

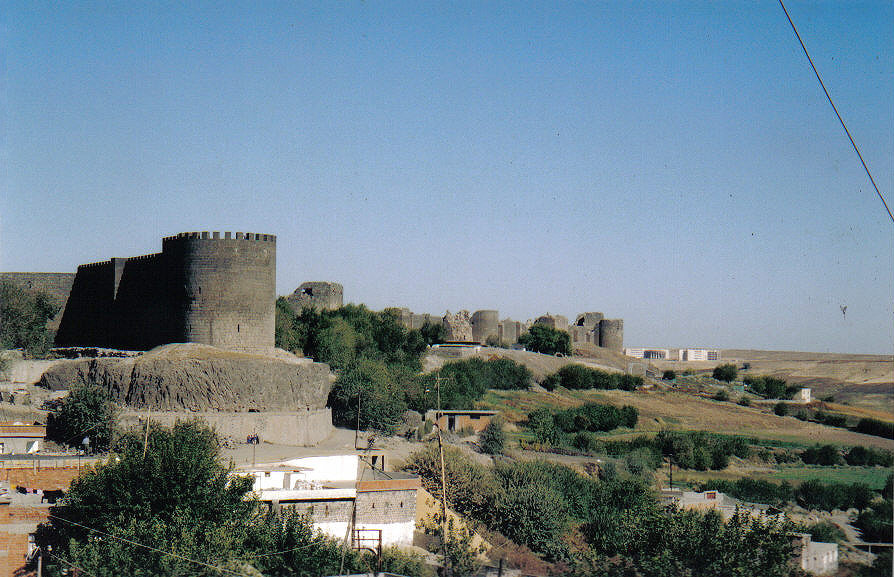
The walls of Amida (Turkey)

Year 359 (CCCLIX) was a common year starting on Friday of the Julian calendar. At the time, it was known as the Year of the Consulship of Eusebius and Hypatius (or, less frequently, year 1112 Ab urbe condita). The denomination 359 for this year has been used since the early medieval period, when the Anno Domini calendar era became the prevalent method in Europe for naming years.

== Events ==
=== By place ===
==== Roman Empire ====
- King Shapur II the Great of the Persian Empire invades southern Armenia. The Romans implement a scorched earth policy and place strong guards at the Euphrates crossings.
- Siege of Amida: Shapur II besieges the Roman fortress of Amida (modern Diyarbakir). After seventy-three days the city is conquered and the population is massacred by the Persians. Ammianus Marcellinus is a fortunate survivor and flees to Singara (Iraq).
- The first known Prefect of the city of Constantinople, Honoratus, takes office.
- Famine in Upper Rhineland: A fleet of 800 river boats, built for the Rhine, cross to the British east coast, and carry back enough corn to raise the famine.
- Winter – Shapur II halts his campaign, due to heavy casualties during the Persian invasion.

=== By topic ===
==== Art ====
- The Sarcophagus of Junius Bassus, in the Old St. Peter's Basilica, Vatican, is made (approximate date).

==== Religion ====
- July – Emperor Constantius II convenes the Council of Rimini, to resolve the crisis over Arianism in the Church. Some 400 bishops of the Western portion of the Roman Empire attend, while the Eastern bishops simultaneously hold a meeting at Seleucia. Given Saint Jerome's comment that, "The whole world groaned in astonishment to find itself Arian", it appears to have failed. Pope Liberius rejects the new creed at Rimini.

== Births ==
- Godigisel, king of the Vandals (d. 406)
- Gratian, Roman emperor (d. 383)
- Murong Chong, Chinese emperor (d. 386)
- Stilicho, Roman general (d. 408)

== Deaths ==
- Barbatio, Roman general (magister militum)
- Hosius of Corduba, Christian bishop (b. 256)
- Junius Bassus Theotecnius, Roman politician
- Xun Xian (or Lingze), Chinese general (b. 322)
- Zhang Guan, Chinese general and regent
