= 386th =

386th may refer to:

- 386th Air Expeditionary Wing, provisional United States Air Force unit assigned to United States Air Forces Central
- 386th Fighter Squadron or 174th Air Refueling Squadron, unit of the Iowa Air National Guard 185th Air Refueling Wing
- 386th Infantry Division (Germany) or 3rd Infantry Division (Wehrmacht), established under the cover name Wehrgauleitung Frankfurt in 1934
- 386th Tactical Fighter Squadron, inactive United States Air Force unit

== See also ==
- 386 (number)
- 386 (disambiguation)
- 386, the year 386 (CCCLXXXVI) of the Julian calendar
- 386 BC
