= Nanyi Lake =

- Location within China
- Coordinates: 31°05′26″N 118°58′34″E
- Lake type: Fresh water lake
- Catchment area: 3,368.7 km^{2} (1,300.7 sq mi)
- Basin countries: China
- Max. length: 26 km (16 mi)
- Max. width: 8.4 km (5 mi)
- Surface area: 148.4 km^{2} (100 sq mi)
- Average depth: 2.25 m (7 ft)
- Max. depth: 3.25 m (11 ft)
- Water volume: 334×10^{6} m^{3} (11.8×10^{9} cu ft)
- Surface elevation: 9.38 m (31 ft)

Nanyi Lake (Chinese: 南漪湖; pinyin: Nányī Hú) is a freshwater lake in China, it is situated in south of Anhui Province, between Xuanzhou District and Langxi County. The area of the watershed is 3,368.7 square kilometres (1,300.7 sq mi), with an elevation of 9.38 metres (30.8 ft), its length is 26 kilometres (16 mi) and the greatest breadth from east to west is 8.4 kilometres (5 mi) (the average breadth is 5.7 kilometres (4 mi)). The surface is equal to 148.4 square kilometres (100 sq mi), and volume is about 334 million cubic metres (11.8×10^{9} cu ft). The maximum depth of the Nanyi Lake is 3.25 metres (11 ft), and the average being 2.25 metres (7 ft).
