= Murong Yi =

Murong Yi 慕容顗

Ruler of Western Yan
- Reign: 386
- Predecessor: Duan Sui
- Successor: Murong Yao
- Died: 386
Full name
- Family name: Mùróng (慕容); Given name: Yǐ (顗)
Era name and dates
- Jiànmíng (建明): 386
- Dynasty: Western Yan

Murong Yi (Chinese: 慕容顗; died 386) was a ruler of the Xianbei-led Chinese Western Yan dynasty. He was a son of the Former Yan Prince of Yidu, Murong Huan (慕容桓), a son of the founder of Former Yan, Murong Huang.

In 386, after the temporary ruler Duan Sui was ambushed and killed by Murong Heng (慕容恆) and Murong Yong, they supported Murong Yi as the Prince of Yan. The Western Yan people—400,000 men and women—then abandoned Chang'an, which had been the Former Qin capital but had been captured by the prior Western Yan ruler Murong Chong -- to head back to their homeland in the east. While on the journey, however, Murong Heng's brother Murong Tao (慕容韜) killed Murong Yi at Linjin (臨晉, in modern Weinan, Shaanxi). He was replaced by Murong Chong's son Murong Yao.

Prince of (Western) Yan House of Murong Died: 386
Chinese royalty
Preceded by Duan Sui	Prince of Yan; 386	Succeeded by Murong Yao
Titles in pretence
Preceded by Duan Sui	— TITULAR — Emperor of China; 386; Reason for succession failure: Sixteen Kingdoms	Succeeded by Murong Yao
