= 322 =

322 in various calendars
| Gregorian calendar | 322; CCCXXII |
| Ab urbe condita | 1075 |
| Assyrian calendar | 5072 |
| Balinese saka calendar | 243–244 |
| Bengali calendar | −272 – −271 |
| Berber calendar | 1272 |
| Buddhist calendar | 866 |
| Burmese calendar | −316 |
| Byzantine calendar | 5830–5831 |
| Chinese calendar | 辛巳年 (Metal Snake); 3019 or 2812 — to — 壬午年 (Water Horse); 3020 or 2813 |
| Coptic calendar | 38–39 |
| Discordian calendar | 1488 |
| Ethiopian calendar | 314–315 |
| Hebrew calendar | 4082–4083 |
- Hindu calendars
| Vikram Samvat | 378–379 |
| Shaka Samvat | 243–244 |
| Kali Yuga | 3422–3423 |
| Holocene calendar | 10322 |
| Iranian calendar | 300 BP – 299 BP |
| Islamic calendar | 309 BH – 308 BH |
| Javanese calendar | 203–204 |
| Julian calendar | 322; CCCXXII |
| Korean calendar | 2655 |
| Minguo calendar | 1590 before ROC 民前1590年 |
| Nanakshahi calendar | −1146 |
| Seleucid era | 633/634 AG |
| Thai solar calendar | 864–865 |
| Tibetan calendar | ལྕགས་མོ་སྦྲུལ་ལོ་ (female Iron-Snake); 448 or 67 or −705 — to — ཆུ་ཕོ་རྟ་ལོ་ (male Water-Horse); 449 or 68 or −704 |

Year 322 (CCCXXII) was a common year starting on Monday of the Julian calendar. At the time, it was known as the Year of the Consulship of Probianus and Iulianus (or, less frequently, year 1075 Ab urbe condita). The denomination 322 for this year has been used since the early medieval period, when the Anno Domini calendar era became the prevalent method in Europe for naming years.

== Events ==
=== By topic ===
==== Technology ====
- The first dependable representation of a horse rider with paired stirrups is found in China, in a Jin Dynasty tomb.

== Births ==
- Kang of Jin (or Shitong), Chinese emperor (d. 344)
- Xun Xian (or Lingze), Chinese general (d. 359)

== Deaths ==
- Philogonius (or Filogonius), bishop of Antioch
- Rabbah bar Rav Huna, Jewish Talmudist
- Xu Kan, Chinese bandit leader and warlord
- Yang Xianrong, Chinese empress
