= 436 =

436 in various calendars
Gregorian calendar	436; CDXXXVI
Ab urbe condita	1189
Assyrian calendar	5186
Balinese saka calendar	357–358
Bengali calendar	−158 – −157
Berber calendar	1386
Buddhist calendar	980
Burmese calendar	−202
Byzantine calendar	5944–5945
Chinese calendar	乙亥年 (Wood Pig); 3133 or 2926 — to — 丙子年 (Fire Rat); 3134 or 2927
Coptic calendar	152–153
Discordian calendar	1602
Ethiopian calendar	428–429
Hebrew calendar	4196–4197
- Hindu calendars
Vikram Samvat	492–493
Shaka Samvat	357–358
Kali Yuga	3536–3537
Holocene calendar	10436
Iranian calendar	186 BP – 185 BP
Islamic calendar	192 BH – 191 BH
Javanese calendar	320–321
Julian calendar	436; CDXXXVI
Korean calendar	2769
Minguo calendar	1476 before ROC 民前1476年
Nanakshahi calendar	−1032
Seleucid era	747/748 AG
Thai solar calendar	978–979
Tibetan calendar	ཤིང་མོ་ཕག་ལོ་ (female Wood-Boar); 562 or 181 or −591 — to — མེ་ཕོ་བྱི་བ་ལོ་ (male Fire-Rat); 563 or 182 or −590

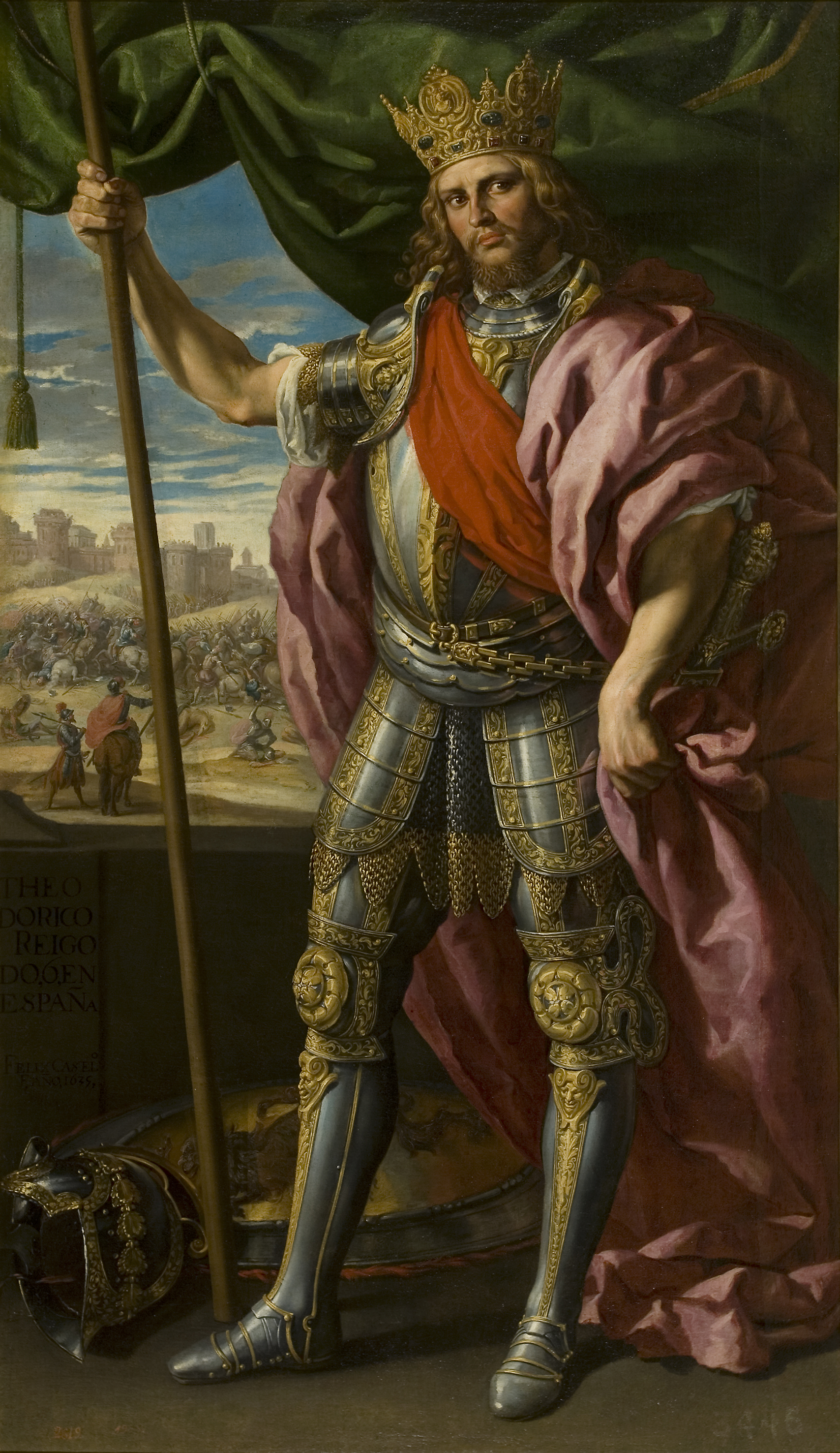
Theodoric I, by Felix Castello (1635)

Year 436 (CDXXXVI) was a leap year starting on Wednesday of the Julian calendar. At the time, it was known as the Year of the Consulship of Isodorus and Senator (or, less frequently, year 1189 Ab urbe condita). The denomination 436 for this year has been used since the early medieval period, when the Anno Domini calendar era became the prevalent method in Europe for naming years.

== Events ==
=== By place ===
==== Europe ====
- End of the Burgundian Revolt of Gunther: Flavius Aetius, Roman general (magister militum), attempts to put an end to Burgundian raids in Gaul. He calls in Hun mercenaries under the command of Attila and his brother Bleda, which plunder Augusta Vangionum, killing some 20,000 Burgundians. The Kingdom of the Burgundians is destroyed; King Gunther and his family are killed (this epic disaster will later provide the source for the Nibelungenlied).
- In the Gothic War (436-439) besieges king Theodoric I the city of Narbonne; the Visigoths obtain access to the Mediterranean Sea and the roads to the Pyrenees.

=== By topic ===
==== Religion ====
- The Buddhist Srimala Sutra is translated into Chinese by Gunabhadra.

== Births ==
- Wang Zhenfeng, empress of the Liu Song dynasty (d. 479)

== Deaths ==
- April 9 – Tan Daoji, general of the Liu Song dynasty
- Chu Lingyuan, last empress of the Jin dynasty (b. 384)
- Gunther, king of the Burgundians (approximate date)
