= 342 =

342 in various calendars
Gregorian calendar	342; CCCXLII
Ab urbe condita	1095
Assyrian calendar	5092
Balinese saka calendar	263–264
Bengali calendar	−252 – −251
Berber calendar	1292
Buddhist calendar	886
Burmese calendar	−296
Byzantine calendar	5850–5851
Chinese calendar	辛丑年 (Metal Ox); 3039 or 2832 — to — 壬寅年 (Water Tiger); 3040 or 2833
Coptic calendar	58–59
Discordian calendar	1508
Ethiopian calendar	334–335
Hebrew calendar	4102–4103
- Hindu calendars
Vikram Samvat	398–399
Shaka Samvat	263–264
Kali Yuga	3442–3443
Holocene calendar	10342
Iranian calendar	280 BP – 279 BP
Islamic calendar	289 BH – 288 BH
Javanese calendar	223–224
Julian calendar	342; CCCXLII
Korean calendar	2675
Minguo calendar	1570 before ROC 民前1570年
Nanakshahi calendar	−1126
Seleucid era	653/654 AG
Thai solar calendar	884–885
Tibetan calendar	ལྕགས་མོ་གླང་ལོ་ (female Iron-Ox); 468 or 87 or −685 — to — ཆུ་ཕོ་སྟག་ལོ་ (male Water-Tiger); 469 or 88 or −684

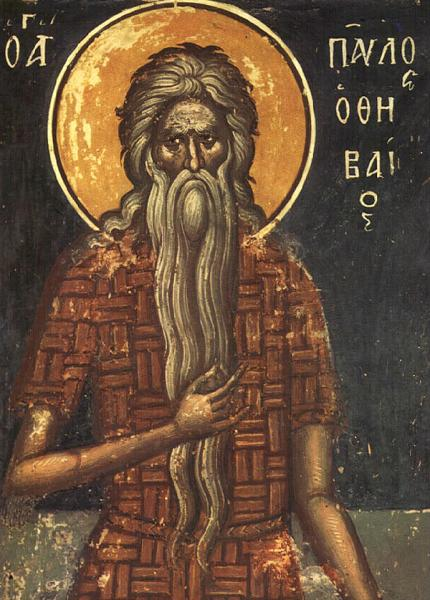
Saint Paul of Thebes

Year 342 (CCCXLII) was a common year starting on Friday of the Julian calendar. At the time, it was known as the Year of the Consulship of Constantius and Claudius (or, less frequently, year 1095 Ab urbe condita). The denomination 342 for this year has been used since the early medieval period, when the Anno Domini calendar era became the prevalent method in Europe for naming years.

== Events ==
=== By place ===
==== Roman Empire ====
- Emperor Constans I campaigns in Britain against the Picts.
- Constans I campaigns victoriously against the Franks.

==== Asia ====
- A large earthquake strikes Cyprus.
- Goguryeo is invaded by Murong Huang of the Xianbei.
- Jin Kangdi succeeds his brother Jin Chengdi as emperor of China.

=== By topic ===
==== Religion ====
- Paul I, Patriarch of Constantinople, is deposed and replaced by Macedonius I.
- February 15 – The original Hagia Sophia is dedicated in Constantinople.

== Births ==
- Fei of Jin (or Sima Yi), Chinese emperor (d. 386)

== Deaths ==
- July 26 – Chen of Jin (or Sima Yan), Chinese emperor (b. 321)
- Barsabias, Christian abbot, missionary and martyr
- Paul of Thebes, Christian hermit (approximate date)
- Tiberius Julius Rhescuporis VI, Roman client king
