= 344 =

344 in various calendars
Gregorian calendar	344; CCCXLIV
Ab urbe condita	1097
Assyrian calendar	5094
Balinese saka calendar	265–266
Bengali calendar	−250 – −249
Berber calendar	1294
Buddhist calendar	888
Burmese calendar	−294
Byzantine calendar	5852–5853
Chinese calendar	癸卯年 (Water Rabbit); 3041 or 2834 — to — 甲辰年 (Wood Dragon); 3042 or 2835
Coptic calendar	60–61
Discordian calendar	1510
Ethiopian calendar	336–337
Hebrew calendar	4104–4105
- Hindu calendars
Vikram Samvat	400–401
Shaka Samvat	265–266
Kali Yuga	3444–3445
Holocene calendar	10344
Iranian calendar	278 BP – 277 BP
Islamic calendar	287 BH – 286 BH
Javanese calendar	225–226
Julian calendar	344; CCCXLIV
Korean calendar	2677
Minguo calendar	1568 before ROC 民前1568年
Nanakshahi calendar	−1124
Seleucid era	655/656 AG
Thai solar calendar	886–887
Tibetan calendar	ཆུ་མོ་ཡོས་ལོ་ (female Water-Hare); 470 or 89 or −683 — to — ཤིང་ཕོ་འབྲུག་ལོ་ (male Wood-Dragon); 471 or 90 or −682

Year 344 (CCCXLIV) was a leap year starting on Sunday of the Julian calendar. At the time, it was known as the Year of the Consulship of Leontius and Bonosus (or, less frequently, year 1097 Ab urbe condita). The denomination 344 for this year has been used since the early medieval period, when the Anno Domini calendar era became the prevalent method in Europe for naming years.

== Events ==
=== By place ===
==== Roman Empire ====
- The Eastern Roman Emperor Constantius II campaigns in eastern Mesopotamia, against the Sassanid Persians.
- Battle of Singara: The Roman army under Constantius wins a close victory, at the strongly fortified city of Singara (Mesopotamia). His enemy, King Shapur II, is forced to lift the siege, and withdraw the Persian army.
- Shapur II, for the second time, besieges the Roman fortress of Nisibis in eastern Mesopotamia, but is repulsed by forces under General Lucilianus.

==== Asia ====
- Jin Mudi, age 1, succeeds his father Jin Kangdi as emperor of China. His mother, Empress Dowager Chu, becomes the ruling authority at court, and serves as regent.
- Gye becomes king of the Korean kingdom of Baekje.

=== By topic ===
==== Art ====
- The making of a detail of Admonitions of the Imperial Instructress to Court Ladies (attributed to Gu Kaizhi and being from the Six Dynasties period) begins (approximate year) and is completed in 406. It is now kept at the British Museum, London.

==== Religion ====
- Bishop Eustorgius I brings relics of the Three Magi from Constantinople to Milan, according to a 12th century legend.

== Births ==
- Gu Kaizhi, Chinese painter (approximate date)
- Kumārajīva, Buddhist monk and translator (d. 413)
- Mary of Egypt, patron Saint (approximate date)
- Wang Xianzhi, Chinese calligrapher (d. 386)
- Zhang Yaoling, ruler of Former Liang (d. 355)

== Deaths ==
- April 14
  - Chusdazat, Syrian Orthodox priest, martyr and saint
  - Pusai, Syrian Orthodox priest, martyr and saint
- August 20 – Heliodorus of Bet Zabdai, bishop and martyr
- November 17 – Jin Kangdi, emperor of the Jin Dynasty (b. 322)

=== Date unknown ===
- Biryu of Baekje, king of Baekje (Three Kingdoms of Korea)
