= Empress Yang (Former Qin) =

Chinese empress (died 386)

Empress Yang (Chinese: 楊皇后; personal name unknown; died 386) was an empress of the Di-led Former Qin dynasty of China. Her husband was Fu Pi (Emperor Aiping).

She was already Fu Pi's wife and duchess at least by 380, when her brother Yang Ying (楊膺) was described as one of the Di officers who commanded soldiers distributed to Fu Pi, then serving as viceroy over the six eastern provinces formerly ruled by Former Yan, as part of Fu Jiān (Emperor Xuanzhao)'s plan to distribute his Di people around the empire to serve as a stabilizing force. When the empire subsequently began collapsing in 384 following the failure to conquer Jin and defeat at the Battle of Fei River in 383, Yang Ying suggested to Fu Pi, whose headquarters of Yecheng (鄴城, in modern Handan, Hebei) was the only city in the eastern empire that had not fallen either to Jin or to the new state Later Yan, established by the rebel general Murong Chui, that he should surrender to Jin. When Fu Pi refused, Yang Ying conspired with another official, Jiang Rang (姜讓), to forcibly seize Fu Pi and surrender to Jin, but was discovered and killed. Despite this, Duchess Yang remained Fu Pi's wife.

In 385, the Former Qin capital Chang'an fell to the rebel state Western Yan, and Fu Jiān was killed by another rebel general, Yao Chang the founder of Later Qin. Upon hearing this news, Fu Pi, who had then withdrawn from Yecheng to Jinyang (晉陽, in modern Taiyuan, Shanxi), declared himself emperor, and he created Princess Yang empress. Their son Ning was named crown prince. (Note: Contrary to Cui Hong's account, historian Fangyi Cheng lists Fu Ning as only a "possible son" of Empress Yang.) In 386, however, as he tried to intercept Western Yan's prince Murong Yong, who was trying to return east, he was defeated by Murong Yong, and Empress Yang was captured. Fu Pi would then be intercepted by the Jin general Feng Gai (馮該) and killed. Murong Yong wanted to take Empress Yang as a consort, but she tried to assassinate him with a sword. He then put her to death.

== Notes ==
Chinese royalty
Preceded by Empress Gou	Empress of Former Qin; 385–386	Succeeded by Empress Mao
Preceded by Empress Gou	Empress of China (Eastern Gansu); 385–386	Succeeded by Empress Mao
Preceded by Empress Gou	Empress of China (Central/Southern Shanxi); 385–386	Succeeded by Empress Duan Yuanfei of Later Yan
Preceded by Empress Gou	Empress of China (Northern Shanxi/Inner Mongolia); 385–386	Succeeded by Empress Murong of Northern Wei
Preceded by Empress Gou	Empress of China (Central/Western Gansu); 385–386	Succeeded by Princess/Empress Shi of Later Liang
Preceded by Empress Gou	Empress of China (Southwestern Gansu/Southeastern Qinghai); 385	Succeeded by Queen Bian of Western Qin
