= Prince of Yan =

Chinese feudal title

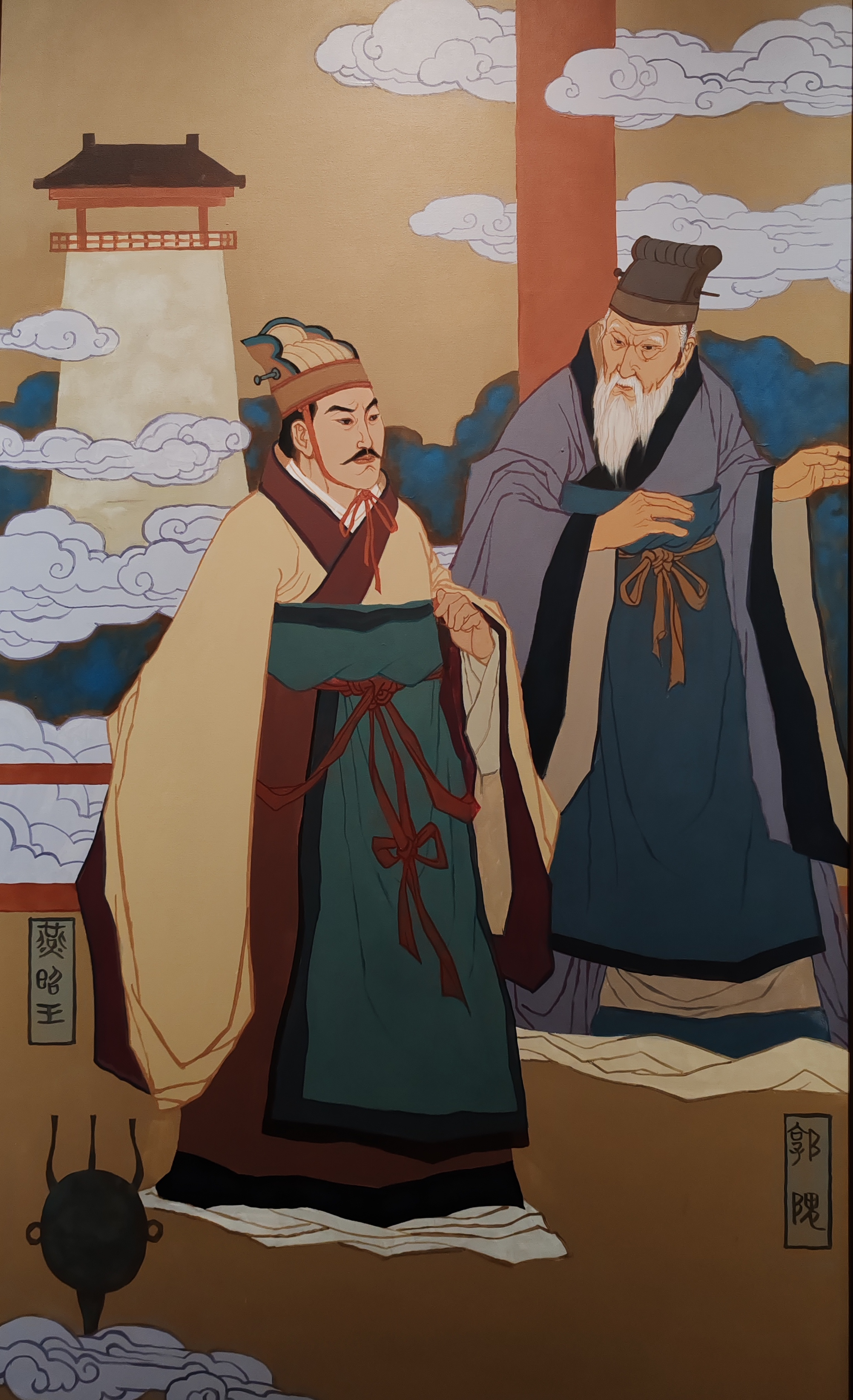
King Zhao of Yan and Guo Huai (郭隗)

Prince or King of Yan (Chinese: 燕王; pinyin: Yān wáng; Wade–Giles: Yen^{¹}-wang^{²}) was a Chinese feudal title referring to the ancient Chinese State of Yan and to its fiefs including the capital Yanjing (located within modern Beijing).

Typically, the title is translated as "King of Yan" for rulers prior to the establishment of the Chinese empire by Qin Shi Huang and "Prince of Yan" as a peerage title after the restoration of feudal titles by the Han dynasty. It was generally held by powerful members of the imperial family and – owing to its important position protecting central China from Mongolian and Manchurian invaders – typically included powerful and well-fortified military forces.

More specifically, "Yanwang" in Chinese and "Prince of Yan" in English typically refers to Zhu Di, who held that rank before launching the Jingnan Campaign which established him as the Ming dynasty's Yongle Emperor in the 15th century.

== Zhou dynasty ==
- King Xiao of Yan (燕孝王)
- King Xi of Yan, ruled 255–222 BC, last king of the Yan state.

== Qin dynasty ==
- Han Guang, (died 206 BC), a regional warlord in Liaodong.
- Zang Tu, (died 202 BC), a warlord who lived in the late Qin dynasty and early Han dynasty.

== Han dynasty ==
- Lu Wan, (256 BC – 194 BC), a military general served under Liu Bang.
- Liu Jian (Chinese: 劉建), ruled 195 BC – 180 BC, Emperor Gaozu of Han's eighth son.
- Lu Tong (Chinese: 呂通), died 180 BC, appointed by Empress Lü Zhi.

== Three Kingdoms ==
- Cao Yu (Chinese: 曹宇), ruled 232–265, Cao Cao's son.
- Gongsun Yuan (Chinese: 公孫淵), claimed independence in 237 and called his country Yan, which fell in 238.

== Jin dynasty and Sixteen Kingdoms ==
- Sima Ji (Chinese: 司馬機), younger brother of Emperor Wu of Jin.
- Murong Huang, (297–348), founder of the Former Yan state.
- Murong Jun, (319–360), first ruler declared emperor in Former Yan.
- Murong Yi, (died 386), a ruler of the Western Yan state.
- Murong Yao, (died 386), a ruler of the Western Yan state.
- Murong Zhong, (died 386), a ruler of the Western Yan state.
- Murong Yong, (died 394), last ruler of the Western Yan state.

== Sui and Tang dynasties ==
- Yang Tan (Chinese: 楊倓), son of Yang Zhao and grandson of Emperor Yang of Sui.
- Luo Yi, a Sui dynasty official later submitted to Tang dynasty.
- Li Yu (Chinese: 李祐), fifth son of Emperor Taizong of Tang.
- Li Lingkui (Chinese: 李靈夔), nineteenth son of Emperor Gaozu of Tang.

== Song dynasty ==
- Zhao Dezhao, second son of Emperor Taizu of Song.
- Zhao Yuanyan, eighth son of Emperor Taizong of Song.
- Zhao Yu, son of Emperor Shenzong of Song.

== Yuan dynasty ==
- Zhenjin, second son of Kublai Khan.

== Ming dynasty ==
- The Yongle Emperor, third emperor of Ming dynasty.

== Qing dynasty ==
- Qin Rigang, a military leader of the Taiping Rebellion.

== See also ==
- Hebei
- History of Beijing
- Yan (state)
- Yan Kingdom (Han dynasty)
- Former Yan
- Western Yan
- Later Yan
- Southern Yan
- Northern Yan
- Yan (An–Shi)
- Yan (Five Dynasties period)
