= HM LST-414 =

LST-1-class tank landing ship

History

United Kingdom
- Name: LST-414
- Ordered: as a Type S3-M-K2 hull, MCE hull 934
- Builder: Bethlehem-Fairfield Shipyard, Baltimore, Maryland
- Yard number: 2186
- Laid down: 18 October 1942
- Launched: 21 November 1942
- Commissioned: 19 January 1943
- Identification: Hull symbol: LST-414
- Fate: Lost in action, 15 August 1943

General characteristics
- Class & type: LST-1-class tank landing ship
- Displacement: 4,080 long tons (4,145 t) full load; 2,160 long tons (2,190 t) landing
- Length: 328 ft (100 m) oa
- Beam: 50 ft (15 m)
- Draft: Full load: 8 ft 2 in (2.49 m) forward; 14 ft 1 in (4.29 m) aft; Landing at 2,160 t: 3 ft 11 in (1.19 m) forward; 9 ft 10 in (3.00 m) aft
- Installed power: 2 × 900 hp (670 kW) Electro-Motive Diesel 12-567A diesel engines; 1,700 shp (1,300 kW)
- Propulsion: 1 × Falk main reduction gears; 2 × Propellers
- Speed: 12 kn (22 km/h; 14 mph)
- Range: 24,000 nmi (44,000 km; 28,000 mi) at 9 kn (17 km/h; 10 mph) while displacing 3,960 long tons (4,024 t)
- Boats & landing craft carried: 2 or 6 x LCVPs
- Capacity: 2,100 tons oceangoing maximum; 350 tons main deckload
- Troops: 163
- Complement: 117
- Armament: Varied, ultimate armament; 1 × QF 12-pounder 12 cwt naval gun; 6 × 20 mm (0.79 in) Oerlikon cannon; 4 × Fast Aerial Mine (FAM) mounts

HMS LST-414 was a United States Navy LST-1-class tank landing ship that was transferred to the Royal Navy during World War II. As with many of her class, the ship was never named. Instead, she was referred to by her hull designation.

== Construction ==
LST-414 was laid down on 18 October 1942, under United States Maritime Commission (MARCOM) contract, MC hull 934, by the Bethlehem-Fairfield Shipyard, Baltimore, Maryland; launched 21 November 1942; then transferred to the United Kingdom and commissioned on 19 January 1943.

== Service history ==
LST-414 saw no active service in the United States Navy.

At 03:35, 15 August 1943, LST-414 was struck by a torpedo off Cani Rocks, Tunisia. Capitano Carlo Faggioni, of the Regia Aeronautica (Italian Air Force), had flown his SM.79 torpedo bomber of the 278th ''Squadriglia'', 132nd ''Gruppo'', from Decimomannu Airfield in Sardinia. LST-414 was later beached off Bizerta.

She struck from the Navy list on 24 November 1943.

== See also ==
- List of United States Navy LSTs

== Notes ==
Citations

== Bibliography ==
Online resources

- "LST-414". Dictionary of American Naval Fighting Ships. Naval History and Heritage Command. This article incorporates text from this source, which is in the public domain.
- "Bethlehem-Fairfield, Baltimore MD". ShipbuildingHistory.com. 14 August 2008.
- "USS LST-414". NavSource. 15 November 2004.
- Helgason, Guðmundur. "HMS LST-414". German U-boats of WWII - uboat.net.
