= 423 =

423 in various calendars
- Gregorian calendar: 423; CDXXIII
- Ab urbe condita: 1176
- Assyrian calendar: 5173
- Balinese saka calendar: 344–345
- Bengali calendar: −171 – −170
- Berber calendar: 1373
- Buddhist calendar: 967
- Burmese calendar: −215
- Byzantine calendar: 5931–5932
- Chinese calendar: 壬戌年 (Water Dog); 3120 or 2913 — to — 癸亥年 (Water Pig); 3121 or 2914
- Coptic calendar: 139–140
- Discordian calendar: 1589
- Ethiopian calendar: 415–416
- Hebrew calendar: 4183–4184
- Hindu calendars
- Vikram Samvat: 479–480
- Shaka Samvat: 344–345
- Kali Yuga: 3523–3524
- Holocene calendar: 10423
- Iranian calendar: 199 BP – 198 BP
- Islamic calendar: 205 BH – 204 BH
- Javanese calendar: 307–308
- Julian calendar: 423; CDXXIII
- Korean calendar: 2756
- Minguo calendar: 1489 before ROC 民前1489年
- Nanakshahi calendar: −1045
- Seleucid era: 734/735 AG
- Thai solar calendar: 965–966
- Tibetan calendar: ཆུ་ཕོ་ཁྱི་ལོ་ (male Water-Dog); 549 or 168 or −604 — to — ཆུ་མོ་ཕག་ལོ་ (female Water-Boar); 550 or 169 or −603

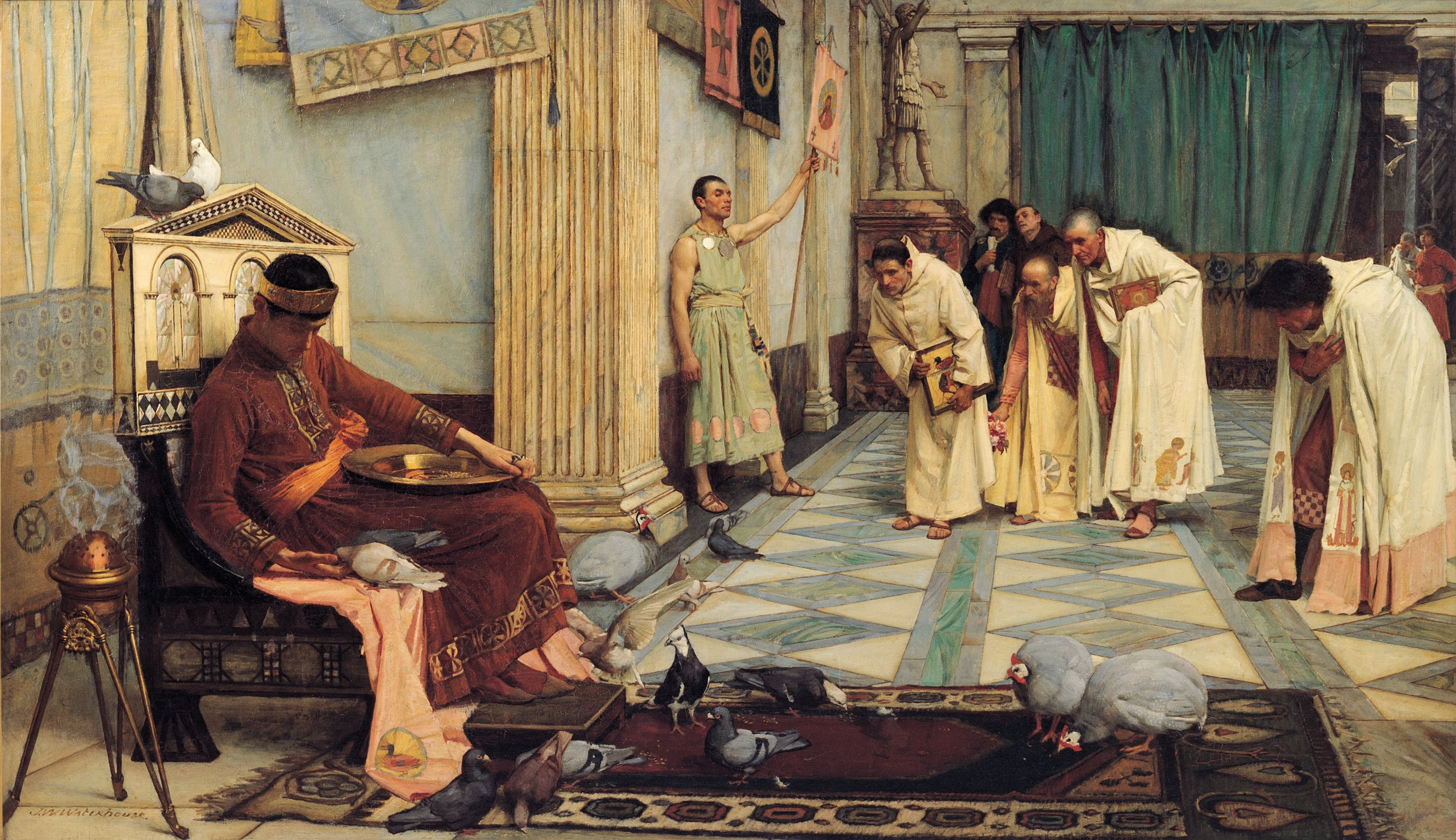
The favorites of Emperor Honorius, by John William Waterhouse (1883)

Year 423 (CDXXIII) was a common year starting on Monday of the Julian calendar. At the time, it was known in Rome as the Year of the Consulship of Marinianus and Asclepiodotus (or, less frequently, year 1176 Ab urbe condita). The denomination 423 for this year has been used since the early medieval period, when the Anno Domini calendar era became the prevalent method in Europe for naming years.

== Events ==
=== By place ===
==== Roman Empire ====
- Early spring – Roman empress Galla Placidia departs with her children Grata Honoria and Valentinian to the court of Constantinople.
- August 15 – Emperor Honorius, age 38, dies at Ravenna of dropsy, perhaps pulmonary edema. With no children to claim the throne, Joannes, primicerius notariorum ("chief notary", head of the civil service), seizes the throne of the Western Roman Empire, and is declared emperor. Among his supporters are Flavius Aetius, Roman general (magister militum). Joannes' rule is accepted in the dioceses of Gaul, Hispania and Italia, but not in Africa.
- Winter – Emperor Theodosius II refuses to recognize Joannes as emperor, and prepares for war. He mobilizes an expeditionary force under command of Ardaburius, and his son Flavius Aspar.

=== By topic ===
==== Religion ====
- Theodoret becomes bishop of Cyrrhus (Syria). He converts more than 1,000 Marcionites in his diocese.

== Births ==
- Theodosius the Cenobiarch, monk and founder of the Monastery of St. Theodosius (approximate date)

== Deaths ==
- August 15 – Honorius, Roman Emperor (b. 384)
- December 23 – Ming Yuan Di, ruler of the Xianbei state Northern Wei (b. 392)
- Eulalius, antipope of Rome
- Tufa, Chinese princess and wife of Qifu Chipan
- Xiao Wenshou, empress dowager of the Liu Song dynasty (b. 343)
