= Murong Yao =

Murong Yao 慕容瑤

Ruler of Western Yan
- Reign: 386
- Predecessor: Murong Yi
- Successor: Murong Zhong
- Died: 386
Full name
- Family name: Mùróng (慕容); Given name: Yáo (瑤)
Era name and dates
- Jiànpíng (建平): 386
- Dynasty: Western Yan

Murong Yao (Chinese: 慕容瑤; died 386), also known as Murong Wang (慕容望), was an emperor of the Xianbei-led Western Yan dynasty of China. He was the son of Murong Chong (Emperor Wei), the son of the Former Yan emperor Murong Jun.

Murong Chong was killed in 386 by his general, Han Yan (韓延) after he, against his people's desire to return to their homeland, wanted to settle in Chang'an. Two intervening brief reigns by Duan Sui and Murong Yi took place, but after Murong Tao (慕容韜) killed Murong Yi, Murong Tao's brother Murong Heng (慕容恆), who did not approve of Murong Tao's actions, supported Murong Yao as emperor. However, the people did not favor Murong Yao. They abandoned him in favor of general Murong Yong, who then killed Murong Yao in a coup and replaced him with Murong Zhong, the son of Western Yan's founder Murong Hong the Prince of Jibei.

Prince of (Western) Yan House of Murong Died: 386
Chinese royalty
| Preceded by Murong Yi | Prince of Yan; 386 | Succeeded by Murong Zhong |
Titles in pretence
| Preceded by Murong Yi | — TITULAR — Emperor of China; 386; Reason for succession failure: Sixteen Kingdoms | Succeeded by Murong Zhong |
