= Duan Sui =

Duan Sui 段隨

Ruler of Western Yan
- Reign: 386
- Predecessor: Murong Chong
- Successor: Murong Yi
- Died: 386
Full name
- Family name: Duàn (段); Given name: Suí (隨)
Era name and dates
- Chāngpíng (昌平): 386
- Dynasty: Western Yan

Duan Sui (Chinese: 段隨; died 386) was a monarch of the Xianbei-led Chinese Western Yan dynasty. He was the only ruler of the short-lived state who was not a member of the Murong clan, the imperial clan of the Western Yan.

He was a general under the emperor Murong Chong, whose people wanted to return east to their homeland but who, after capturing the Former Qin capital Chang'an, wanted to settle in Chang'an, against the wishes of his people. In spring 386, the general Han Yan (韓延) assassinated Murong Chong in a coup and supported Duan Sui as the Prince of Yan. About a month later, however, the officials Murong Heng (慕容恆) and Murong Yong ambushed Duan Sui and killed him. They supported Murong Yi, the son of the Former Yan Prince of Yidu Murong Huan (慕容桓) as the new Prince of Yan.

Chinese royalty
Preceded by Murong Chong as Emperor of Western Yan	Prince of Yan; 386	Succeeded by Murong Yi
Titles in pretence
Preceded by Murong Chong	— TITULAR — Emperor of China; 386; Reason for succession failure: Sixteen Kingdoms	Succeeded by Murong Yi
Preceded by Murong Chong	— TITULAR — Emperor of China; 386; Reason for succession failure: Sixteen Kingdoms	Succeeded by Yao Chang
