= 414 BC =

414 BC in various calendars
Gregorian calendar	414 BC; CDXIV BC
Ab urbe condita	340
Ancient Egypt era	XXVII dynasty, 112
Pharaoh	Darius II of Persia, 10
Ancient Greek Olympiad (summer)	91st Olympiad, year 3
Assyrian calendar	4337
Balinese saka calendar	N/A
Bengali calendar	−1007 – −1006
Berber calendar	537
Buddhist calendar	131
Burmese calendar	−1051
Byzantine calendar	5095–5096
Chinese calendar	丙寅年 (Fire Tiger); 2284 or 2077 — to — 丁卯年 (Fire Rabbit); 2285 or 2078
Coptic calendar	−697 – −696
Discordian calendar	753
Ethiopian calendar	−421 – −420
Hebrew calendar	3347–3348
- Hindu calendars
Vikram Samvat	−357 – −356
Shaka Samvat	N/A
Kali Yuga	2687–2688
Holocene calendar	9587
Iranian calendar	1035 BP – 1034 BP
Islamic calendar	1067 BH – 1066 BH
Javanese calendar	N/A
Julian calendar	N/A
Korean calendar	1920
Minguo calendar	2325 before ROC 民前2325年
Nanakshahi calendar	−1881
Thai solar calendar	129–130
Tibetan calendar	མེ་ཕོ་སྟག་ལོ་ (male Fire-Tiger) −287 or −668 or −1440 — to — མེ་མོ་ཡོས་ལོ་ (female Fire-Hare) −286 or −667 or −1439

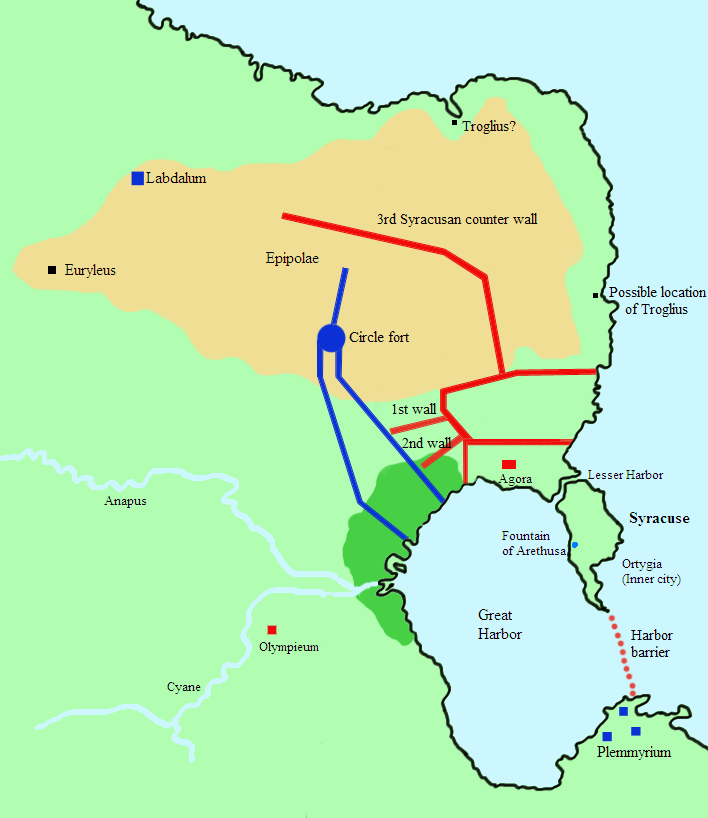
Siege of Syracuse

Year 414 BC was a year of the pre-Julian Roman calendar. At the time, it was known as the Year of the Tribunate of Cossus, Ambustus, Potitus and Albinus (or, less frequently, year 340 Ab urbe condita). The denomination 414 BC for this year has been used since the early medieval period, when the Anno Domini calendar era became the prevalent method in Europe for naming years.

== Events ==
=== By place ===
==== Greece ====
- Athens responds to appeals from its general, Nicias, by sending out 73 vessels to Sicily under the command of Demosthenes to assist Nicias and his forces with the siege of Syracuse.
- The Athenian army moves to capture Syracuse while the larger fleet of Athenian ships blocks the approach to the city from the sea. After some initial success, the Athenian troops become disorganised in the chaotic night operation and are thoroughly routed by Gylippus, the Spartan commander. The Athenian commander Lamachus is killed. Nicias, although ill, is left in sole charge of the siege of Syracuse.

=== By topic ===
==== Drama ====
- Aristophanes' play The Birds is performed.

== Deaths ==
- Lamachus, Athenian general
