= Pulcheria (daughter of Theodosius I) =

Daughter of Roman Emperor Theodosius I

Pulcheria (c. 378 – c. 385) was the daughter of the emperor Theodosius I and his first wife Aelia Flaccilla.

She was born prior to her father becoming emperor in January 379, but died in childhood, shortly before her mother. In his consolatory oration on Pulcheria, Gregory of Nyssa described her as “a new-sprung blossom, with shining petals not yet lifted fully from the bud,” and vividly recalled how her death devastated the populace, indicating strong sympathy for the emperor’s family.

== Sources ==
- Hebblewhite, Mark (2020). Theodosius and the Limits of Empire. London: Routledge. doi:10.4324/9781315103334. ISBN 978-1-138-10298-9. S2CID 213344890.
- Holum, Kenneth G. (1982). Theodosian Empresses: Women and Imperial Dominion in Late Antiquity. Berkeley, Los Angeles and London: University of California Press. ISBN 978-0-520-04162-2.
- Martindale, John R.; Jones, A. H. M.; Morris, John, eds. (1971). The Prosopography of the Later Roman Empire: Volume I, AD 260–395. Cambridge: Cambridge University Press. ISBN 0-521-07233-6.

=== Primary Sources ===
- Gregory of Nyssa, A Homily of Consolation Concerning Pulcheria
