= Murong Zhong =

Murong Zhong 慕容忠

Ruler of Western Yan
- Reign: 386
- Predecessor: Murong Yao
- Successor: Murong Yong
- Died: 386
Full name
- Family name: Mùróng (慕容); Given name: Zhōng (忠)
Era name and dates
- Jiànwǔ (建武): 386
- Dynasty: Western Yan

Murong Zhong (Chinese: 慕容忠; died 386) was an emperor of the Xianbei-led Western Yan dynasty of China. He was the son of Western Yan's founder, Murong Hong the Prince of Jibei, a son of the Former Yan emperor Murong Jun.

In 386, a year that had already seen four Western Yan rulers killed, Murong Zhong was made emperor by the general Murong Yong after Murong Yong had killed Murong Yao. Murong Zhong made Murong Yong the commander of the armed forces and created him the Duke of Hedong.

At that time, the Western Yan people were on an exodus from Chang'an, the Former Qin capital that they had captured in 385 but abandoned earlier in 386 because they wanted to head east back to their homeland. After Murong Zhong became emperor, his people reached Wenxi (聞喜, in modern Yuncheng, Shanxi) when they heard that Murong Zhong's granduncle Murong Chui had already established Later Yan as its emperor, and they were hesitant to proceed further, and they built the city of Yanxi (燕熙) at Wenxi to serve as temporary headquarters.

Just three months after he became emperor, Murong Zhong was assassinated in a coup by the general Diao Yun (刁雲), who then supported Murong Yong as the ruler.

Prince of (Western) Yan House of Murong Died: 386
Chinese royalty
Preceded by Murong Yao	Prince of Yan; 386	Succeeded by Murong Yong
Titles in pretence
Preceded by Murong Yao	— TITULAR — Emperor of China; 386; Reason for succession failure: Sixteen Kingdoms	Succeeded by Murong Yong
