= Murong Hong =

Murong Hong 慕容泓

Ruler of Western Yan
- Reign: 384
- Successor: Murong Chong
- Died: 384
Full name
- Family name: Mùróng (慕容); Given name: Hóng (泓)
Era name and dates
- Yān xīng (燕興): 384
Posthumous name
- Emperor Liewen (烈文皇帝)
Temple name
- Suzong (肅宗)
- Dynasty: Western Yan

Murong Hong (Chinese: 慕容泓; died 384) was the founder of the Xianbei-led Western Yan dynasty of China. He was a son of the Former Yan emperor Murong Jun and a younger brother of Former Yan emperor Murong Wei.

It is not known when Murong Hong was born. In 359, he was created the Prince of Jibei. After Former Yan was destroyed by Former Qin in 370, he and his brothers were made local officials throughout the Former Qin realm. By 384, he was the secretary general to the commandery governor of Beidi (北地, roughly modern Tongchuan, Shaanxi).

Early that year, he heard that his uncle Murong Chui had rebelled against Former Qin rule in light of the Former Qin emperor Fu Jiān's defeat at the Battle of Fei River in 383. He fled from his post and gathered several thousand Xianbei soldiers and, after defeating the Former Qin general Qiang Yong (強永), claimed for himself the titles of supreme commander and governor of Yong Province (雍州, modern central and northern Shaanxi), but did not claim a more honored regal title than the one he had under Former Yan—Prince of Jibei.

Murong Hong, upon hearing that Fu Jiān's brother Fu Rui (苻叡) was arriving with Former Qin forces to attack him, wanted to flee east back to the Yan homeland with his Xianbei soldiers. Fu Rui, instead, rejecting his assistant Yao Chang's suggestion that Murong Hong be allowed to withdraw, cut off Murong Hong's escape route and attacked him—and Murong Hong defeated and killed him. Meanwhile, his younger brother Murong Chong had also rebelled against Former Qin, but after a defeat joined his army.

Murong Hong sent a demand to Fu Jiān at the Former Qin capital Chang'an for him to deliver his older brother Murong Wei to him, promising to leave Guanzhong and not attack Former Qin any further if that was done. Fu Jiān summoned Murong Wei and rebuked him, but spared Murong Wei when Murong Wei pledged allegiance. He also had Murong Wei write letters to Murong Chui, Murong Hong, and Murong Chong, urging them to surrender. However, Murong Wei also sent a secret messenger to Murong Hong, stating:

I am a man within an iron cage, and there is no reason for me not to die. Further, I also sinned against Yan, and you should not mind me. You should earnestly seek to establish yourself.

He also explicitly urged Murong Hong to prepare taking the imperial title if Murong Hong heard that Fu Jiān had executed him. Murong Hong therefore advanced on Chang'an and officially broke from Former Qin by changing the era name. However, in summer 384, his strategist Gao Gai (高蓋) and other officials felt that Murong Hong's reputation was not as great as his brother Murong Chong's, and that his punishments were overly harsh, killed him and supported Murong Chong to succeed him, under the title of crown prince.

== Personal information ==
- Father
  - Murong Jun (Emperor Jingzhao of Former Yan)
- Children
  - Murong Zhong (慕容忠), later emperor

Prince of Jibe House of Murong Died: 384
Chinese royalty
New creation	Prince of Jibei; 350–370	Suspended Title next held by Himself
Recreated Title last held by Himself	Prince of Jibei; 384	Succeeded by Murong Chong
Titles in pretence
Preceded by Fu Jiān	— TITULAR — Emperor of China; 384; Reason for succession failure: Sixteen Kingdoms	Succeeded by Murong Chong
