= Murong Chong =

Emperor Wei of Western Yan 西燕威帝

Emperor of Western Yan
- Reign: 385–386
- Predecessor: Murong Hong
- Successor: Duan Sui
- Born: c. 359
- Died: 386 (aged 26–27)
- Issue: Murong Yao
Full name
- Family name: Mùróng (慕容); Given name: Chōng (沖)
Era name and dates
- Gēngshǐ (更始): 385–386
Posthumous name
- Emperor Wēi (威皇帝, "aggressive") (short)
Temple name
- Gāozōng (高宗)
- Dynasty: Western Yan
- Father: Murong Jun
- Mother: Empress Dowager Kezuhun

Murong Chong (Chinese: 慕容沖; c. 359–386), formally Emperor Wei of (Western) Yan ((西)燕威帝), was an emperor of the Western Yan. He was a son of the Former Yan emperor Murong Jun and a younger brother of Former Yan emperor Murong Wei.

It is not known when Murong Chong was born — although as his older brother Murong Wei was born in 350, he must have been born later than that, but before 359, when he was created the Prince of Zhongshan. In 368, after his uncle Murong Ke, the regent for his brother Murong Wei, had died in 367, he succeeded Murong Ke in his post as the commander of the armed forces, but there is no evidence that he actually commanded armies. After Former Yan was destroyed by Former Qin in 370, he and his brothers were made local officials throughout the Former Qin realm. Historical accounts indicate that he had a sexual relationship with the Former Qin emperor Fu Jiān—and that Fu Jiān's favors for him and his sister Consort Murong, whom Fu Jiān took as a concubine, were the talk of the Former Qin capital Chang'an.

By 384, he was the governor of Pingyang Commandery (平陽, roughly modern Linfen, Shanxi). When he heard that his uncle Murong Chui and his older brother Murong Hong had rebelled against Former Qin in light of Fu Jiān's defeat at the Battle of Fei River in 383, he rebelled as well. He was soon defeated by the Former Qin general Dou Chong, and he joined his brother Murong Hong.

In summer 384, as Murong Hong was advancing on Chang'an, Murong Hong's strategist Gao Gai (高蓋) and other officials felt that Murong Hong's reputation was not as great as Murong Chong's, and that Murong Hong's punishments were overly harsh. They therefore killed him and supported Murong Chong to be the new ruler. As Murong Wei was still alive but under Former Qin control in Chang'an, Murong Chong took the title of crown prince. Fu Jiān made a peace overture to him with an apparent sexual undertone—by sending him a robe and a message reminding him of their personal relationship, but Murong Chong rejected the overture.

Around the new year 385, Murong Wei and his cousin Murong Su (慕容肅) organized the Xianbei men within Chang'an, preparing to start an uprising to join Murong Chong, but after Fu Jiān discovered their plot, he executed them and slaughtered the Xianbei inside the city.

Upon hearing news of his brother's death, Murong Chong declared himself emperor. After he took the title, he became capricious and handed out rewards and punishments at his whim. However, he did not let up his pressure against Chang'an, and Chang'an, under his siege, soon fell into a terrible famine. He also allowed his soldiers to pillage the Guanzhong region at will. In summer 385, Fu Jiān broke out to try to find food supplies to relieve Chang'an, leaving his crown prince Fu Hong (苻宏) in defense of the city—but as soon as he left, the city fell to Murong Chong, and Fu Hong fled.

Despite his Xianbei people's desire to return east to their homeland, Murong Chong decided to settle in Chang'an—both because he liked the city and because he feared his uncle Murong Chui, who had by then established Later Yan. He therefore sought to get his people to decide to settle as well, but they resented him for the decision. In spring 386, his general Han Yan (韓延) assassinated him in a coup and supported another general, Duan Sui, as the Prince of Yan.

== Personal information ==
- Father
  - Murong Jun (Emperor Jingzhao of Former Yan)
- Children
  - Murong Yao (慕容瑤), later emperor

Emperor Wei of (Western) Yan House of Murong Born: 359 Died: 386
Regnal titles
Preceded by Himself as Prince of Jibei	Emperor of Western Yan; 385–386	Succeeded by Duan Sui as Prince of Yan
Chinese royalty
Preceded by Murong Hong	Prince of Jibei; 384–385	Succeeded by Himself as Emperor of Western Yan
Titles in pretence
Preceded by Murong Hong	— TITULAR — Emperor of China; 384–386; Reason for succession failure: Sixteen Kingdoms	Succeeded by Duan Sui
