= 414 =

414 in various calendars
- Gregorian calendar: 414; CDXIV
- Ab urbe condita: 1167
- Assyrian calendar: 5164
- Balinese saka calendar: 335–336
- Bengali calendar: −180 – −179
- Berber calendar: 1364
- Buddhist calendar: 958
- Burmese calendar: −224
- Byzantine calendar: 5922–5923
- Chinese calendar: 癸丑年 (Water Ox); 3111 or 2904 — to — 甲寅年 (Wood Tiger); 3112 or 2905
- Coptic calendar: 130–131
- Discordian calendar: 1580
- Ethiopian calendar: 406–407
- Hebrew calendar: 4174–4175
- Hindu calendars
- Vikram Samvat: 470–471
- Shaka Samvat: 335–336
- Kali Yuga: 3514–3515
- Holocene calendar: 10414
- Iranian calendar: 208 BP – 207 BP
- Islamic calendar: 214 BH – 213 BH
- Javanese calendar: 297–299
- Julian calendar: 414; CDXIV
- Korean calendar: 2747
- Minguo calendar: 1498 before ROC 民前1498年
- Nanakshahi calendar: −1054
- Seleucid era: 725/726 AG
- Thai solar calendar: 956–957
- Tibetan calendar: ཆུ་མོ་གླང་ལོ་ (female Water-Ox); 540 or 159 or −613 — to — ཤིང་ཕོ་སྟག་ལོ་ (male Wood-Tiger); 541 or 160 or −612

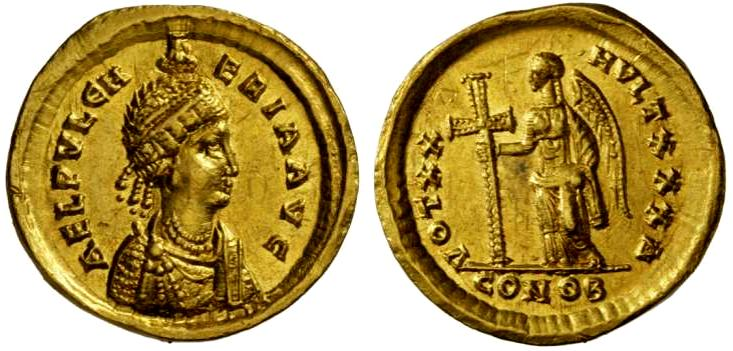
Empress Aelia Pulcheria

Year 414 (CDXIV) was a common year starting on Thursday of the Julian calendar. At the time, it was known as the Year of the Consulship of Constantius and Constans (or, less frequently, year 1167 Ab urbe condita). The denomination 414 for this year has been used since the early medieval period, when the Anno Domini calendar era became the prevalent method in Europe for naming years

== Events ==
=== By place ===
==== Roman Empire ====
- Roman Civil war of 407–415:
  - January 1 – Galla Placidia, half-sister of emperor Honorius, is married to the Visigothic king Ataulf at Narbonne. The wedding is celebrated with Roman festivities and magnificent gifts from the Gothic booty.
  - July 4 – Emperor Theodosius II, age 13, yields power to his older sister Aelia Pulcheria, who reigns as regent and proclaims herself empress (Augusta) of the Eastern Roman Empire.
  - Constantius III, Roman general (magister militum), begins a military campaign against the Visigoths in Gaul. He blockades the Gallic ports and besieges Marseille.
  - Priscus Attalus is proclaimed rival emperor by the Visigoths for a second time at Bordeaux, in order to impose their terms on Honorius, who has his residence in Ravenna.

==== Asia ====
- The Southern Liang, a state of the Sixteen Kingdoms during the Jin Dynasty, comes to an end.

=== By topic ===
==== Religion ====
- Fa-Hien, Chinese Buddhist monk, returns from India and begins translating Buddhist works into Chinese.
- Abdas, bishop of Susa, burns down a Zoroastrian temple; in retaliation, King Yazdegerd I of Persia orders the destruction of churches.

== Deaths ==
- Synesius, bishop of Ptolemais (approximate date)
- Yujiulü Hulü, ruler of the Rouran Khaganate (Mongolia)
