= Western Yan =

384–394 dynastic state of China

Yan 燕
- 384–394
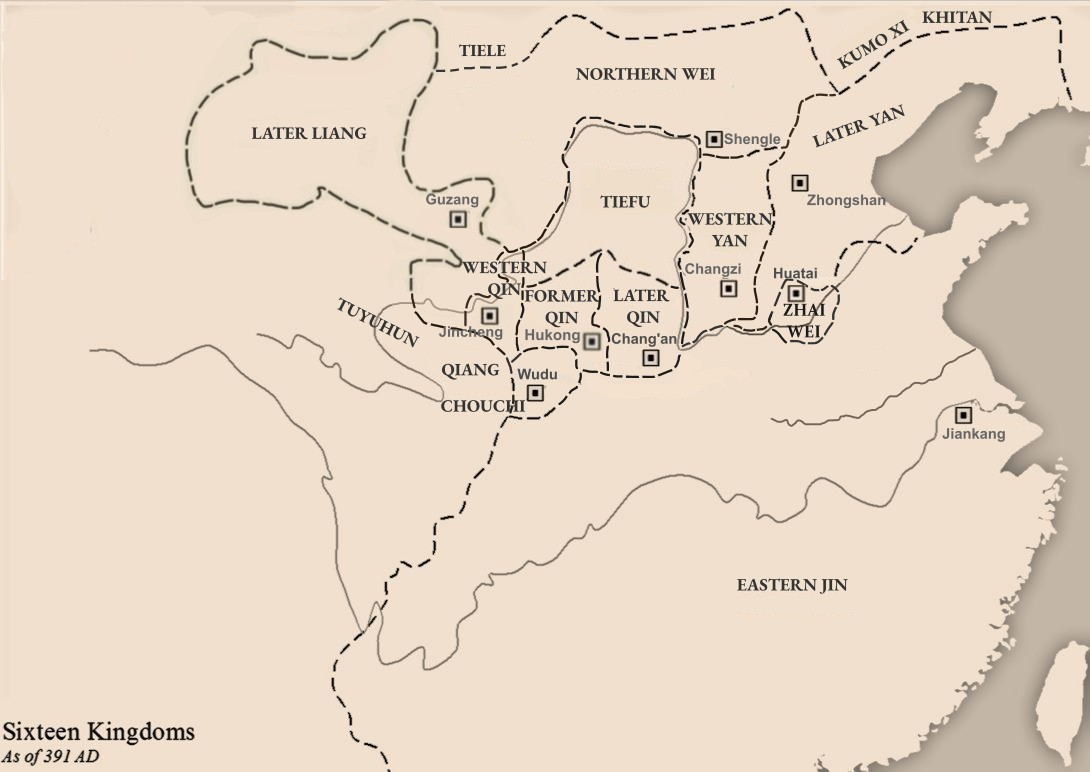
- Capital: Chang'an (385–386); Zhangzi (386–394)
- Emperor
  - 384: Murong Hong
  - 384–386: Murong Chong
  - 386–394: Murong Yong
- History
  - Established: 384
  - Murong Chong's claim of imperial title: 27 January 385
  - Capturing of Chang'an: 385
  - Abandoning of Chang'an: 386
  - Settling at Zhangzi: 386
  - Disestablished: 394
Preceded by	Succeeded by
Former Qin	Later Yan
- Today part of: China

Yan, known in historiography as the Western Yan (Chinese: 西燕; pinyin: Xī Yān; 384–394) was a dynastic state of China ruled by the Xianbei ethnicity. The dynasty existed during the era of Sixteen Kingdoms, but it is not counted among the 16. It was founded by Murong Hong in 384 in the aftermath of the Former Qin's defeat by the Eastern Jin in the Battle of Fei River, with the stated intent of permitting the Xianbei, whom the Former Qin's emperor Fu Jiān had relocated to Former Qin's capital region after destroying the Former Yan in 370. It initially also was intended to rescue the last Former Yan emperor Murong Wei, until he was executed by Fu Jiān in 385. It was a state that was characterized by extreme political instability and internal fighting, as all seven of its rulers (during a short span of 10 years) died of unnatural causes. After eviscerating the Former Qin, the people of the state abandoned the Guanzhong region and headed east back toward their homeland, but eventually settled down in modern Shanxi. It was destroyed in 394 as Later Yan's emperor Murong Chui wanted to reunite the people formerly of Yan and conquered it.

Some rulers of the Western Yan declared themselves emperors while some declared themselves wang (translatable as either "king" or "prince").

== History ==
=== Background ===
After the fall of Former Yan, the last emperor Murong Wei and his brothers were relocated near the Former Qin capital, Chang'an, where they were allowed to serve as military generals and officials. Murong Hong was made Administrator of Beidi while Murong Chong was appointed Administrator of Pingyang. As part of Qin's plan to integrate the various tribes with each other, many Xianbei from the east were resettled in the Guanzhong region, with around 40,000 of them at the time of Former Yan's demise.

In 383, Former Qin suffered a devastating defeat to the Eastern Jin dynasty at the Battle of Fei River. With the Qin exposed, Murong Wei's uncle, Murong Chui restored the state as the Later Yan in Hebei in 384. When news of the restoration reached Beidi, Murong Hong fled east of Tong Pass and gathered the Xianbei. After defeating a Qin force at Huayin, he claimed several offices for himself including the Grand General while declaring Murong Chui as the new prime minister. Murong Chong also rebelled in Pingyang with 20,000 people, but was soon defeated and joined Hong.

Murong Wei was still alive in Chang'an as the rebellions began. The ruler of Former Qin, Fu Jian, ordered him to tell his family members to stand down, but Wei instead secretly deferred his authority over to Hong in a letter, allowing him to take the throne once he hear of his death. Hong changed the reign era, which is often seen as the start of the Western Yan, before leading his soldiers towards Chang'an.

=== Siege of Chang'an ===
Not long after, Murong Hong was assassinated by his official, Gao Gai, who installed Murong Chong as the new leader. After setting camp at Epang Palace, Chong laid siege on Chang'an and fought several battles against Fu Jian for months. During the siege, Murong Wei plotted a rebellion but was discovered and executed by Fu Jian in 385, prompting Chong to claim the title of Emperor of Yan. Eventually, a severe famine broke out in Chang'an, forcing Fu Jian to flee and leave his son, Fu Hong to hold the city. However, Fu Hong soon followed suit, allowing Murong Chong's forces to enter and sack Chang'an.

Fu Jian never returned to Chang'an, as he was captured and killed by the Later Qin. With the ancient capital in hand, Murong Chong was content with settling in, leaving many of his Xianbei followers unsatisfied as they wanted to return to their homeland in the east. Chong was fearful of dealing with his uncle, Murong Chui, so he enacted several policies to help the Xianbei settle. However, in 386, he was assassinated by one of his generals and replaced with Duan Sui.

=== Exodus to the east ===
Duan Sui claimed the title of King of Yan, but he was suddenly killed by Murong Yong and Murong Heng (慕容恆), who acclaimed Murong Yi as the new king. Under Yi, the Xianbei began their exodus to the east from Chang'an, during which the throne was passed from him to Murong Yao and to Murong Zhong in a span of a few months, as they were all assassinated in succession. After Zhong's death, Murong Yong was installed to the throne.

At the time, Shanxi was controlled by Fu Jian's son, Fu Pi, who had declared himself emperor after his father's death. Yong sent envoys to him asking for permission to pass through his territory so that he could join Murong Chui, but was denied. Yong defeated Fu Pi in a decisive battle, and Fu Pi was soon intercepted and killed by Eastern Jin forces. Yong then occupied Fu Pi's capital at Zhangzi (長子, in modern Changzhi, Shanxi), where contrary to his previous intentions, he declared himself the new Emperor of Yan.

=== Rule in Shanxi and fall ===
Though Murong Yong was a distant relative of Murong Wei, being the grandson of Murong Yun (慕容運), the uncle of Former Yan's founder Murong Huang, his proclamation threatened the legitimacy of Later Yan, as there were now two states claiming to be the successor of Former Yan. After several princes defected to Later Yan, Murong Yong had the descendants of Murong Chui and Murong Jun, Former Yan's second ruler and Murong Wei's father, all killed.

Murong Yong ruled Shanxi for roughly nine years, during which he made little effort to expand. He briefly fought with Later Qin and tried to capture Luoyang from Eastern Jin, but was ultimately unsuccessful. In 392, the Dingling-led Zhai Wei state requested reinforcements from Western Yan as they were under attack by Later Yan, but Yong failed to respond and allowed them to fall. With Hebei pacified, Murong Chui set sight on conquering Western Yan and ending the legitimacy question. In 394, Chui personally led his forces to attack Western Yan and laid siege on Zhangzi. Yong was eventually captured and killed, thus ending the Western Yan.

== Rulers of the Western Yan ==
Posthumous names	Personal name	Durations of reign	Era names
Liewen (Note: He is also known by is temple name, Suzong)	Murong Hong	384	Yanxing (燕興) 384
Wei (Note: Also known by his temple name, Gaozong)	Murong Chong	384–386	Yanxing (燕興) 384; Gengshi (更始) 385–386
–	Duan Sui	386	Changping (昌平) 386
–	Murong Yi	386	Jianming (建明) 386
–	Murong Yao	386	Jianping (建平) 386
–	Murong Zhong	386	Jianwu (建武) 386
– (Note: He is known by is pre-ascencion title, Prince of Hedong)	Murong Yong	386–394	Zhongxing (中興) 386–394

== See also ==
- Xianbei
- List of past Chinese ethnic groups
- Wu Hu
