= Cities along the Silk Road =

The Silk Road was ancient network of trade routes that connected many communities of Eurasia(Europe and Asia) by land and sea, stretching from the Mediterranean basin in the west to the Korean peninsula and the Japanese archipelago in the east.

Its main eastern end was in the Chinese city of Chang'an (modern-day Xi'an, China) and its main western end was in the Greek city of Antioch (modern-day Antakya, Turkey). It came into existence in the 2nd century BCE, when Emperor Wu of the Han dynasty was in power, and lasted until the 15th century CE, when the Ottoman Empire blocked off all the trade routes with Europe after it captured Constantinople and thereby conquered the Byzantine Empire.

This article lists the cities along the Silk Road, sorted by region and the modern-day countries in which they are located.

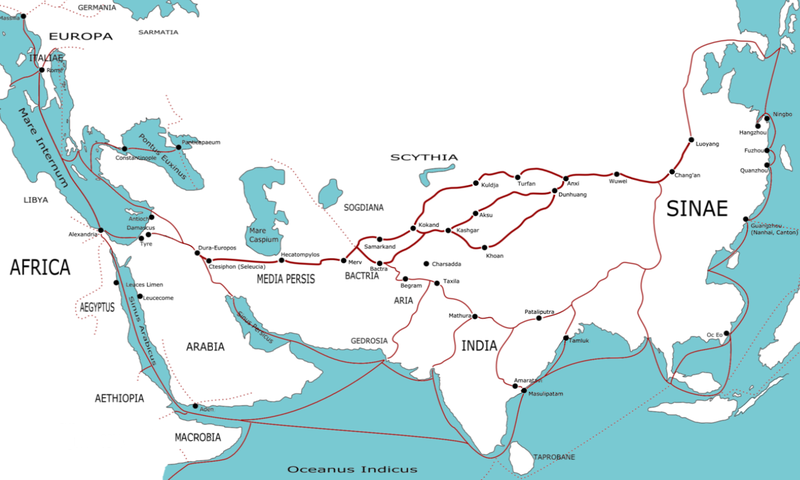
Map of the Silk Road, 1st century CE

== Terrestrial/land routes through Eurasia ==
Major cities, broadly from the Eastern Mediterranean to South Asia, and arranged roughly west to east in each area.

=== West Asia ===
==== Turkey ====
- Constantinople, ancient Byzantium (now Istanbul)
- Bursa
- Beypazarı
- Mudurnu
- Taraklı
- Konya
- Adana
- Antioch
- İzmir
- Trabzon

==== Azerbaijan ====
- Baku
- Shamakhi
- Barda

==== Georgia ====
- Tbilisi (Tiflis)
- Batumi (Batoum)
- Poti

==== Armenia ====
- Yerevan

==== Lebanon ====
- Tyre

==== Syria ====
- Aleppo
- Tartus
- Homs
- Damascus
- Palmyra
- Raqqa
- Dura Europos

==== Iraq ====
- Mosul
- Erbil
- Samarra
- Fallujah
- Baghdad
- Ctesiphon
- Baquba

==== Iran ====
- Tabriz
- Zanjan
- Rasht
- Kermanshah
- Hamadan
- Rey (or Ray in modern-day Tehran)
- Hecatompylos (Damghan)
- Sabzevar
- Nishapur
- Mashhad
- Tus
- Bam
- Yazd
- Qazvin
- Qumis (Hekatompylos)

=== Central Asia ===
==== Turkmenistan ====
- Nisa
- Merv
- Urgench
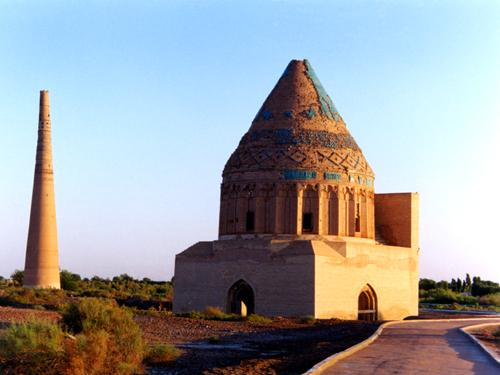
  Ruins of Muhammad II's palace in Old Urgench.
- Amul

==== Uzbekistan ====
- Bukhara
- Shahrisabz
- Samarkand
- Tashkent
- Kokand (Fergana Valley)
- Andijon (Fergana Valley)

==== Tajikistan ====
- Khujand (Fergana Valley)
- Istaravshan

==== Kazakhstan ====
- Otrar
- Ispidjab (or Sairum)
- Taraz
- Hazrat-e Turkestan
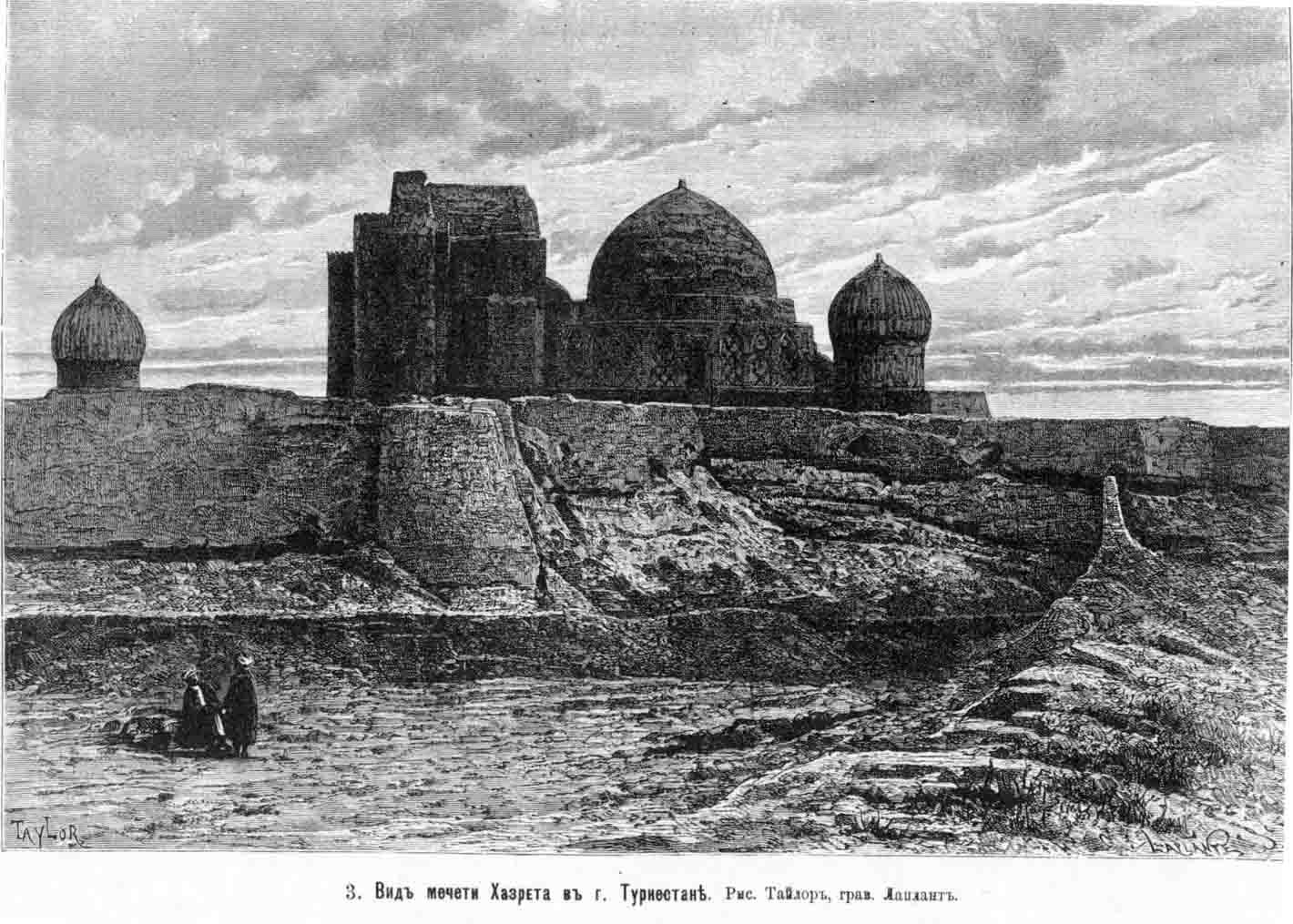
  The Mausoleum of Khoja Ahmed Yasavi in the town of Hazrat-e Turkestan. Built by Timur in the 1390s.
- Almaty

==== Kyrgyzstan ====
- Issyk kul
- Tokmok
- Bishkek
- Osh

=== South Asia ===
==== Afghanistan ====
- Bactra (Balkh)
- Herat
- Alexandria Arachosia (Kandahar)
- Bamyan
- Kabul

==== Pakistan ====
- Peshawar
- Pushkalavati
- Takshashila
- Multan
- Banbhore/Barbarikon
- Debal/Patala

==== India ====
- Tamralipta (or Tamluk)
- Leh
- Jaisalmer
- Mathura
- Varanasi (or Benares)
- Pataliputra

==== Nepal ====
- Kathmandu – see also Patan & Bhaktapur

==== Bangladesh ====
- Wari-Bateshwar
- Pundranagara
- Vikrampura
- Somapura
- Bhitargarh
- Sonargaon
- Chattagram/Chatgaon/Chittagong
- Comilla/Mainamati/Samatata
- Jahangir Nagar/Dhaka

==== Bhutan ====
- Jakar
- Paro

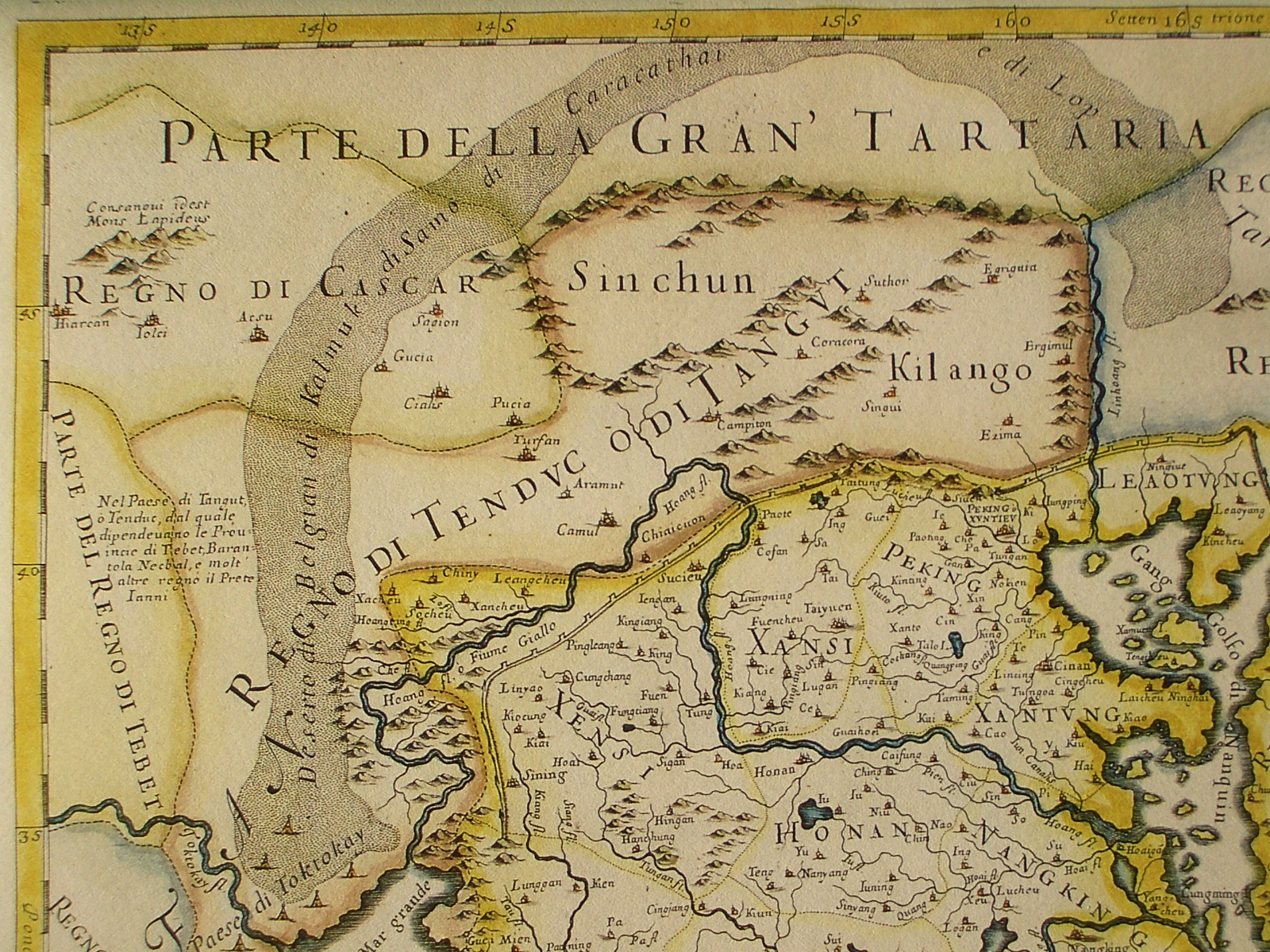
The chain of cities along the northern route along the Taklamakan, probably based on Bento de Góis's itinerary, from Hiarcan (Yarkand) to Cialis (Karasahr or Korla) to Sucieu (Suzhou, Gansu)

=== East Asia ===
==== China: the northern route along the Taklamakan Desert ====
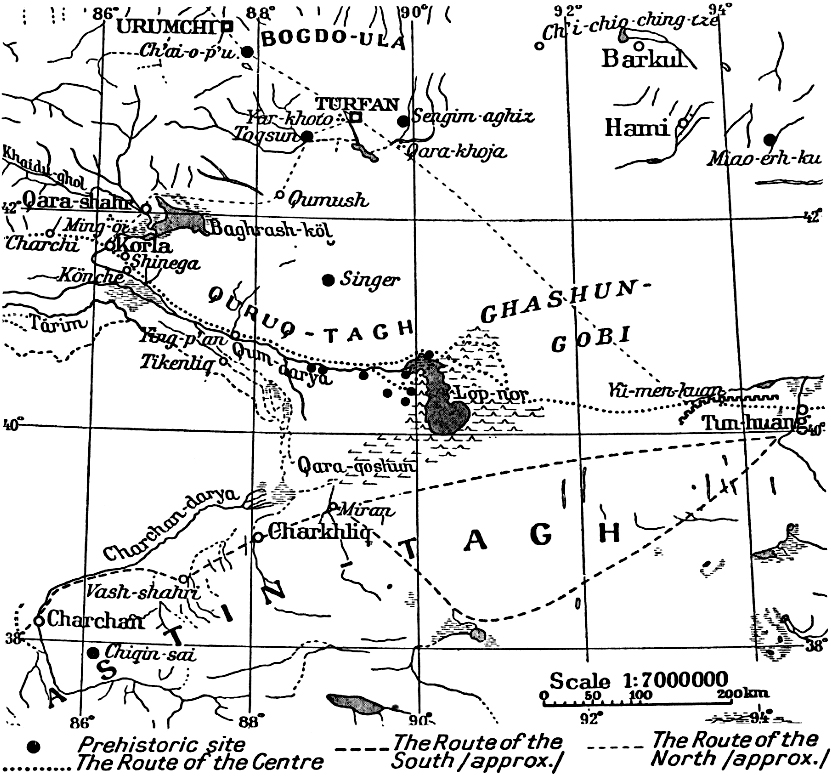
Map of eastern Xinjiang with prehistoric sites and the courses of the Folke Bergman, 1939

- Kashgar (or Kashi) (Major City)
- Liqian
- Aksu
- Kucha
- Korla
- Loulan
- Karasahr (Yanqi)
- Turpan (Turfan)
  - Jiaohe Ruins
  - Turpan Water Museum
- Gaochang
  - the Bezeklik Thousand Buddha Caves
- Chang'an
- Kumul/Hami
- Ürümqi
- Yumen Pass (or Jade Gate or Pass of the Jade Gate) (city called Yumenguan or Hecang)
- Anxi

==== China: the southern route along the Taklamakan Desert ====
- Kashgar (or Kashi) (Major City)
- Pishan
- Khotan
- Niya
- Mingfeng
- Endere
- Charchan
- Waxxari
- Ruoqiang Town (Charklik)
- Miran
- Yangguan, or Yangguan Pass
- Dunhuang
  - the Mogao Caves
- Anxi

==== China: from Anxi/Dunhuang to Chang'an (Xi'an) ====
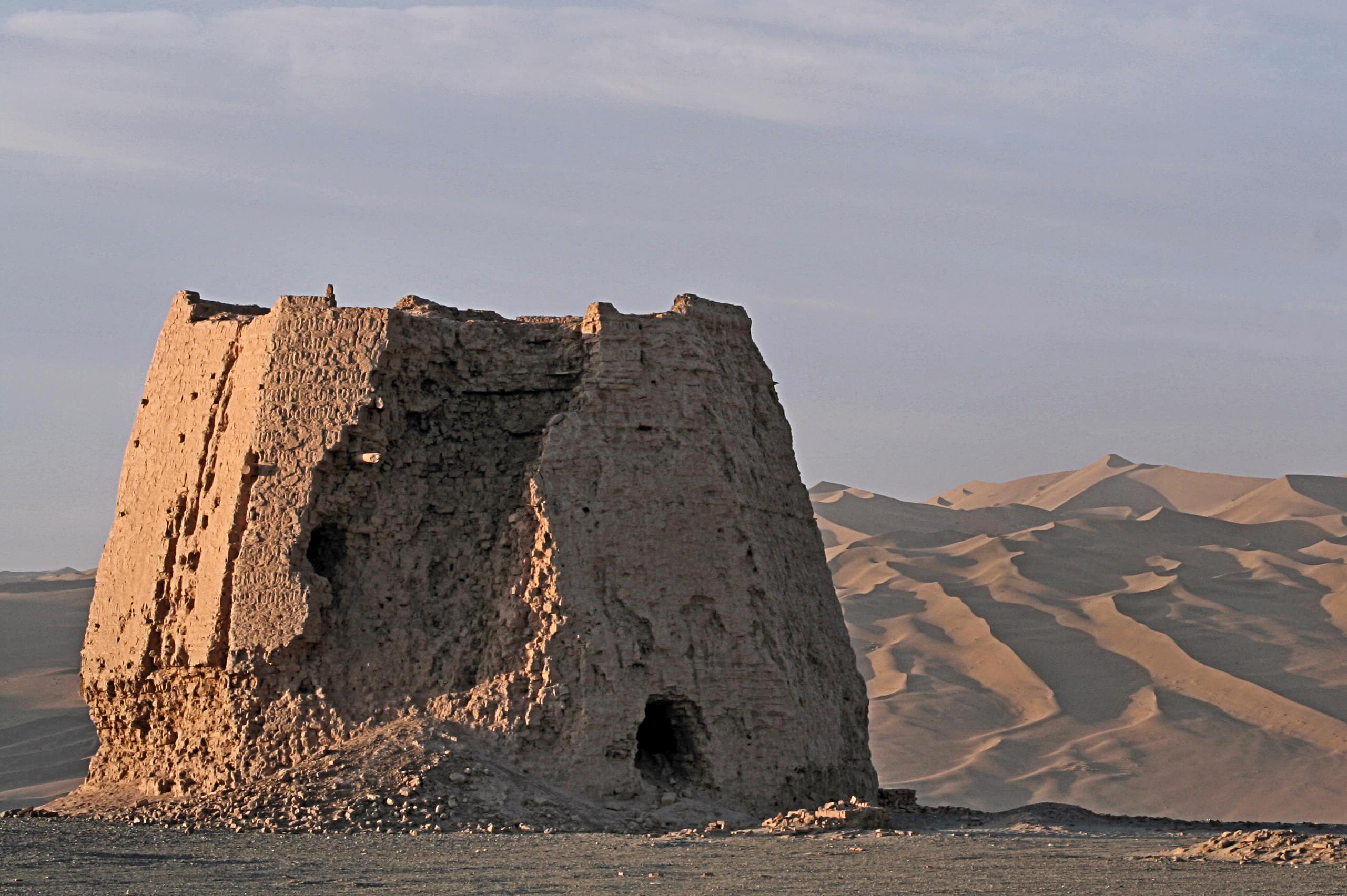
The ruins of a Han dynasty (202 BC – 220 AD) Chinese watchtower made of rammed earth at Dunhuang, Gansu province, the eastern edge of the Silk Road

- Dunhuang (Major City)
- Jiayuguan
- Jiuquan
- Zhangye
- Shandan
- Liangzhou (Wuwei)
- Tianzhu, Gansu
- Lanzhou
- Tianshui
- Baoji
- Chang'an (modern-day Xi'an)

== Maritime routes to or along the Indian Ocean ==
=== South Asia ===
==== Pakistan ====
- Debal
- Banbhore

==== China ====
- Ningbo, China
- Fuzhou, China
- Quanzhou, China
- Guangzhou, China

==== Bangladesh ====
- Chittagong, Bangladesh

==== Sri Lanka ====
- Colombo, Sri Lanka

==== India ====
- Tamralipta, West Bengal, India
- Poompuhar, Tamil Nadu, India
- Chennai, Tamil Nadu, India
- Korkai, Tamil Nadu, India
- Muziris, Kerala, India
- Goa, India
- Mumbai, Maharashtra, India
- Cochin, Kerala, India
- Masulipatnam, Andhra Pradesh, India
- Lothal, Gujarat, India

=== Southern and Eastern Europe ===
==== Ukraine ====
- Sudak, Ukraine

==== Russia ====
- Astrakhan, Russia
- Derbent, Russia

==== Italy ====
- Venice, Italy
- Rome, Italy

=== West Asia ===
==== Oman ====
- Muscat, Oman

==== Yemen ====
- Aden, Yemen

==== Turkey ====
- Ayas, Turkey

=== Northeast Africa ===
==== Somalia ====
- hafun, Somalia

==== Egypt ====
- Suez, Egypt

=== Southeast Asia ===
==== Indonesia ====
- Perlak, Indonesia

==== Malaysia ====
- Kedah (Early history of Kedah)
- Malacca

==== Philippines ====
- Bolinao, Pangasinan, Philippines

==== Thailand ====
- Ligor

==== Vietnam ====
- Vijaya, Champa
- Hanoi, Vietnam
- Hoi An, Vietnam

== List by Claudius Ptolemy ==
This following list is attributed to Ptolemy. All city names are Ptolemy's, throughout all his works. Most of the names are included in Geographia.

Some of the cities provided by Ptolemy either: no longer exist today or have moved to different locations. Nevertheless, Ptolemy has provided an important historical reference for researchers.

(This list has been alphabetized.)

- Africa
  - East Africa – Akhmim, Aromaton Emporion, Axum, Coloe, Dongola, Juba, Maji, Opone, Panopolis, Sarapion, Sennar.
  - North Africa – Caesarea, Carthage, Cyrene, Leptis Magna, Murzuk, Sijilmassa, Tamanrasset, Tingis.
- Arabia – Cane, Eudaemon Arabia, Mokha, Mosylon, Sanaa, Zafar (Saphar), Saue.
- Bangladesh – Sounagaora.
- China – Cattigara, Chengdu, Kaifeng, Qitai, Kunming, Yarkand.
- Europe – Aquileia, Athens, Augusta Treverorum (Trier), Gades (Cádiz), Ostia.
- India – Argaru, Astakapra, Bacare, Balita, Barake, Byzantion, Colchi, Erannoboas, Horaia, Kalliena, Mandagora, Melizeigara, Muziris, korkai, Poompuhar, Naura, Nelcynda, Paethana, Palaepatmae, Palaesimundu, Poduca, Semylla, Sopatma, Suppara, Tagara, Tymdis.
- Pakistan – Barbaricum, Peshawar, Taxila
- Persia – Alexandria Areion, Kandahar, Persepolis.
- Persian Gulf – Apologos, Asabon, Charax, Gerrha (or Gerra), Ommana.
- Red Sea – Adulis, Aualites, Berenica, Malao, ancient Berbera, Mokha, Myos Hormos, Ocalis, Ptolemais Theron.
- Southeast Asia – Kattigara (Oc Eo), Thaton, Trang.
- Unknown – Ecbatana (located in either modern Iran or Syria), Jiaohei.

== See also ==
- Silk Roads: the Routes Network of Chang'an-Tianshan Corridor
- Silk Road transmission of Buddhism
- Silk Road transmission of art
- Silk Road numismatics
