= Turpan Karez Paradise =

Museum in Xinjiang, China

Coordinates: 42.971°N 89.219°E

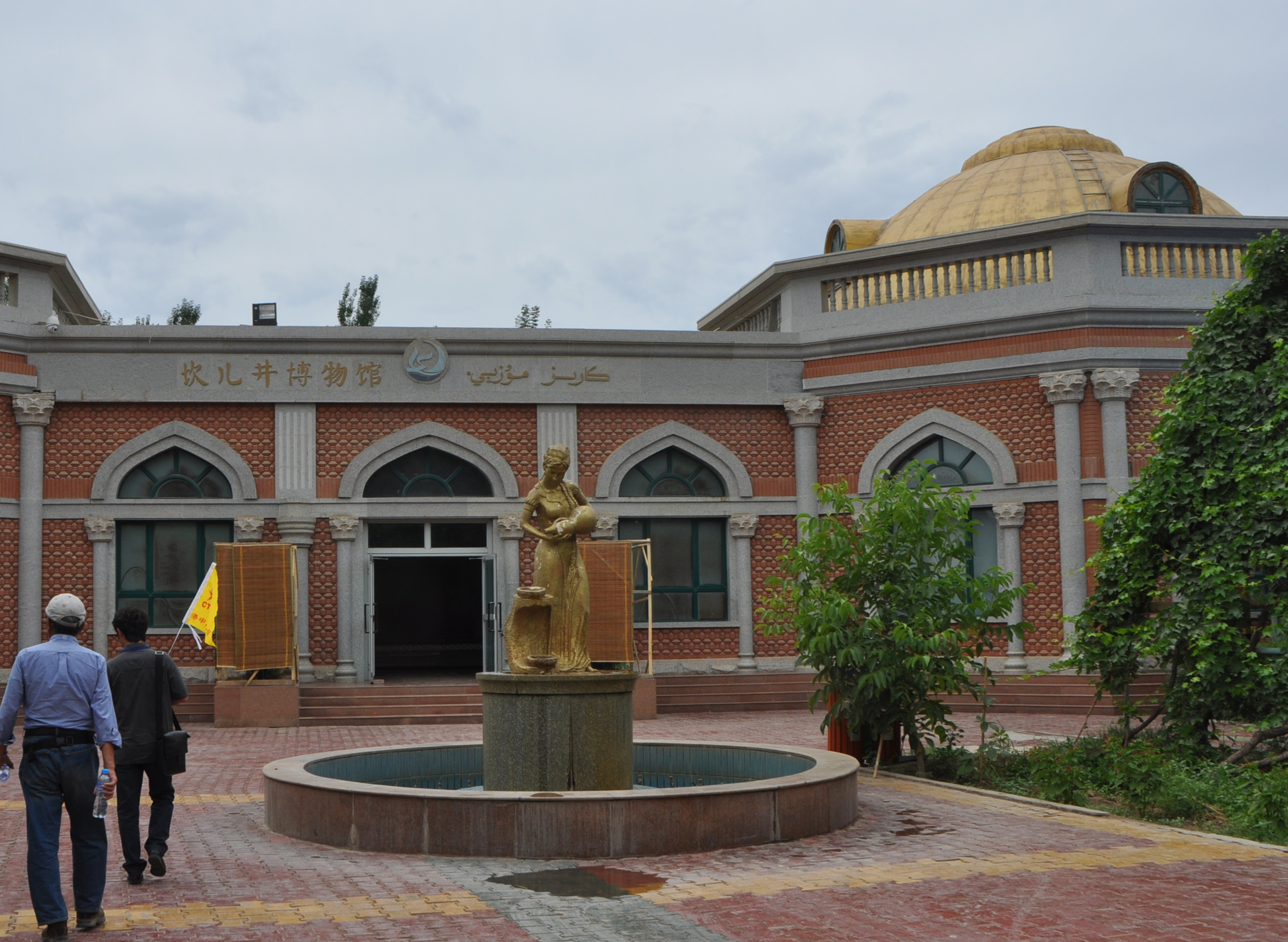
The entrance to the museum of Turpan Karez Paradise

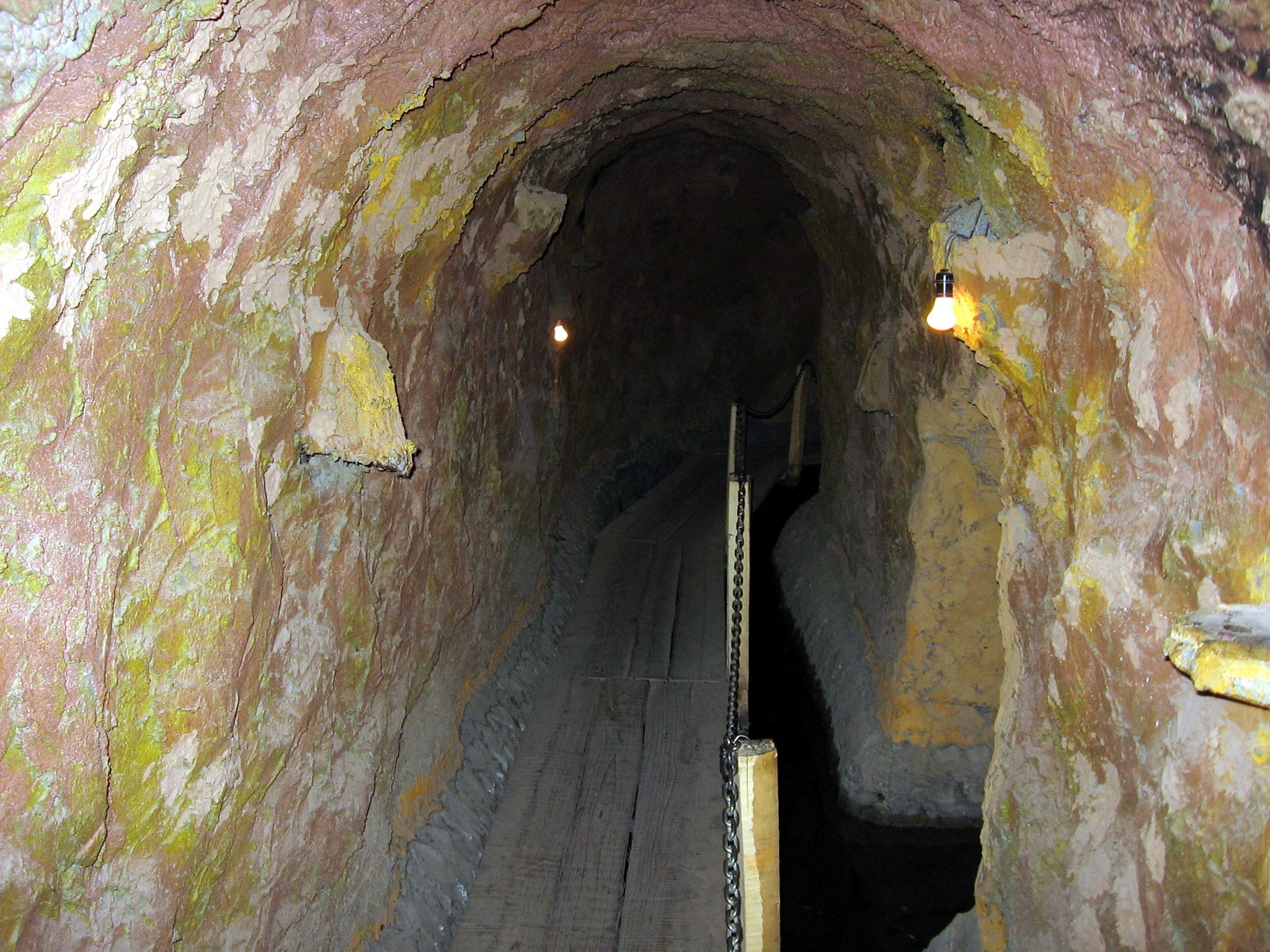
An underground corridor of a Turpan karez

Turpan Karez Paradise (Chinese: 吐魯番坎儿井乐园) is a museum featuring Turpan's karez water management system in Turpan, a city in the Turpan Depression, Xinjiang, China. The karez is a vertical tunnel system connecting wells developed by the Turpan people to irrigate their arid land. The word karez means "well" (karez, Uyghur: كارىز, romanized: kariz) in the local Uyghur language. Visitors to the museum can learn about the underground irrigation system in the desert area and see the karez system in operation.

This facility is in a relatively convenient location, about five kilometers from the city center of Turpan, about one kilometer from China National Highway 312. The karez there, called Miyim Haji's Karez (Chinese: 米依木·阿吉坎儿井) was built about 800 years ago.

== See also ==
- Turpan water system
- Turpan Museum
