= Grape Valley =

Valley in Xinjiang, China

Coordinates: 42°56′06″N 89°38′33″E

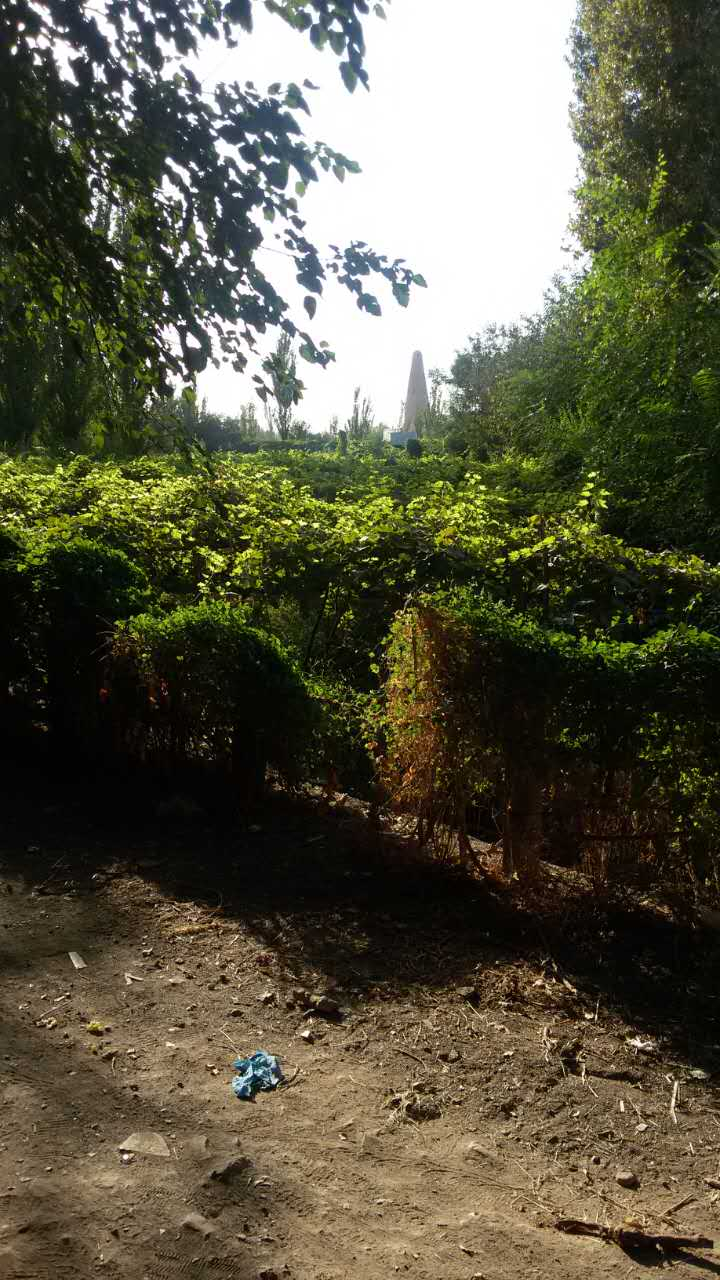
Turpan grape valley

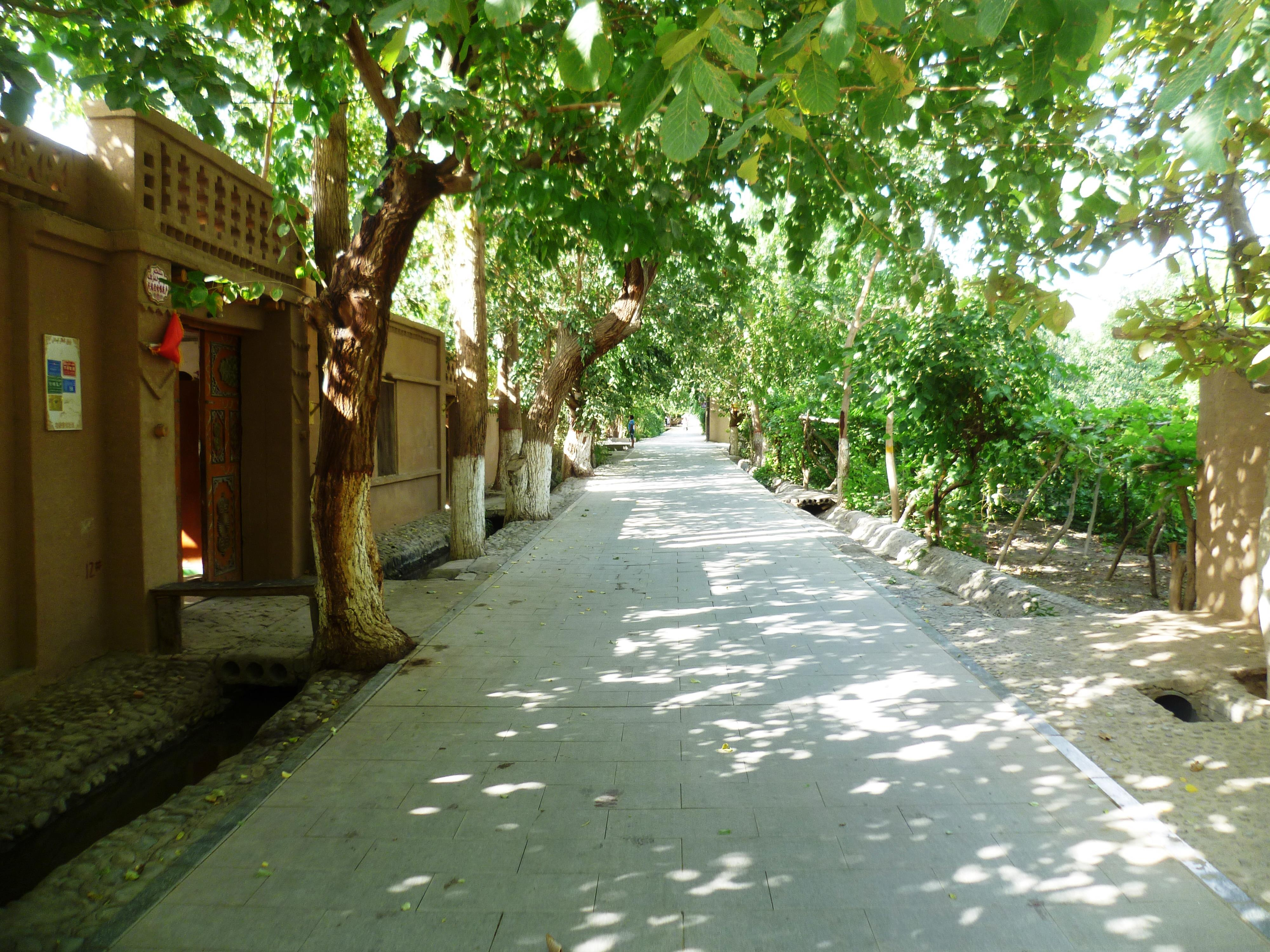
Valley of Grapes, Turpan

Grape Valley (Chinese: 葡萄沟; pinyin: Pútáogōu) is an area of arid land in Turpan, Xinjiang, China, where grapes and other fruits are grown. The valley is 8 km long, 600-2,000 meters wide, and is located some 10 km east of Turpan's city center.

Turpan has a historically long tradition of growing grape and other fruits, using the karez underground irrigation system. It is famous for growing the seedless white grape, the manaizi (Chinese: 马奶子; pinyin: mǎnǎizi, mare's nipple) grape. Raisins and other dried fruits are also sold at the Grape Valley tourists' area.

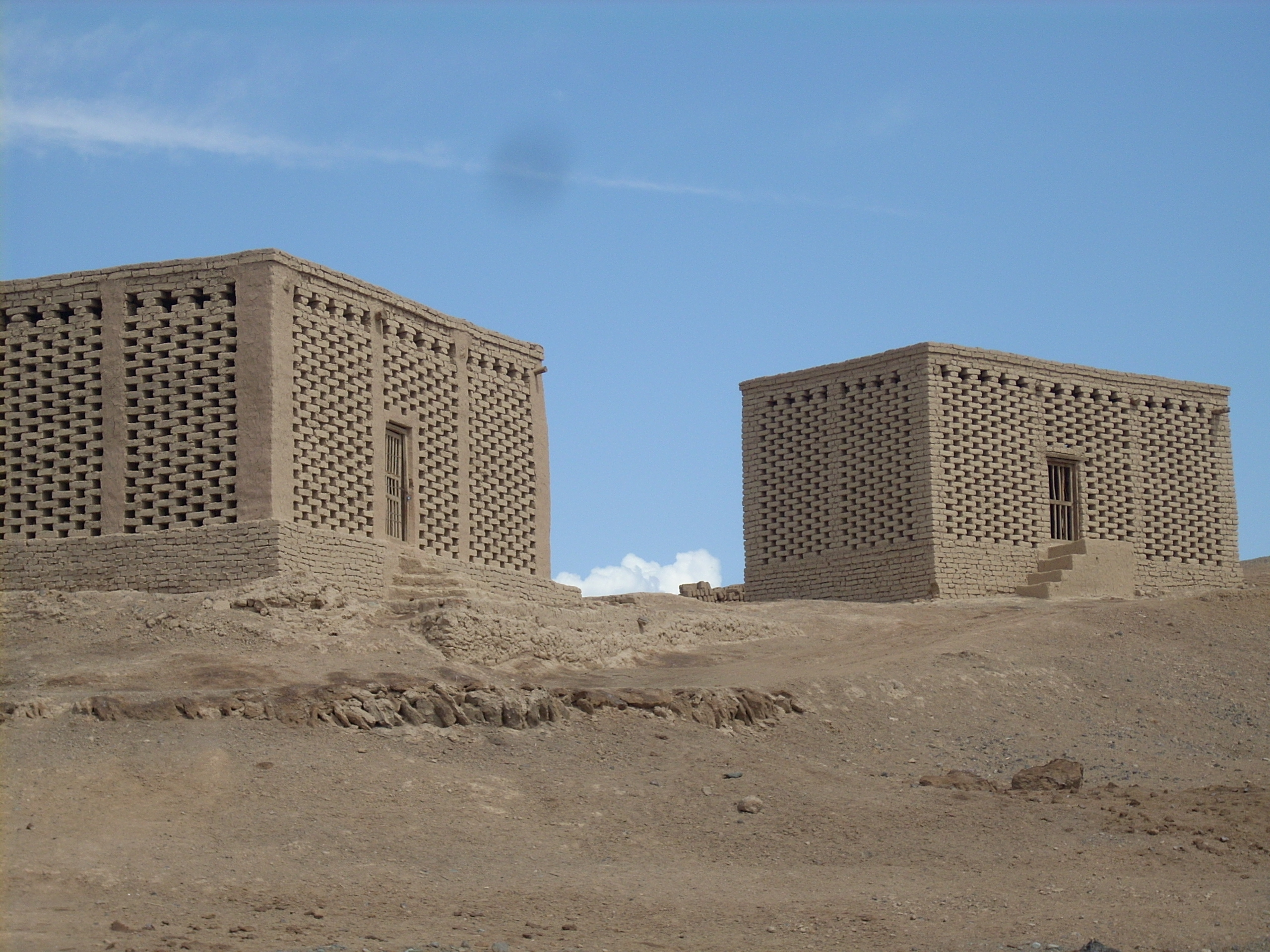
Chunche grape drying buildings

Grape and raisin production in Turpan accounts for over eighty percent of China's total, making China the world's third-largest producer of raisins and the world's largest producer of green raisins.

== See also ==
- Turpan Depression
- Chunche - used for drying grapes
