= Turpan water system =

Irrigation system

Coordinates: 42.873°N 89.398°E

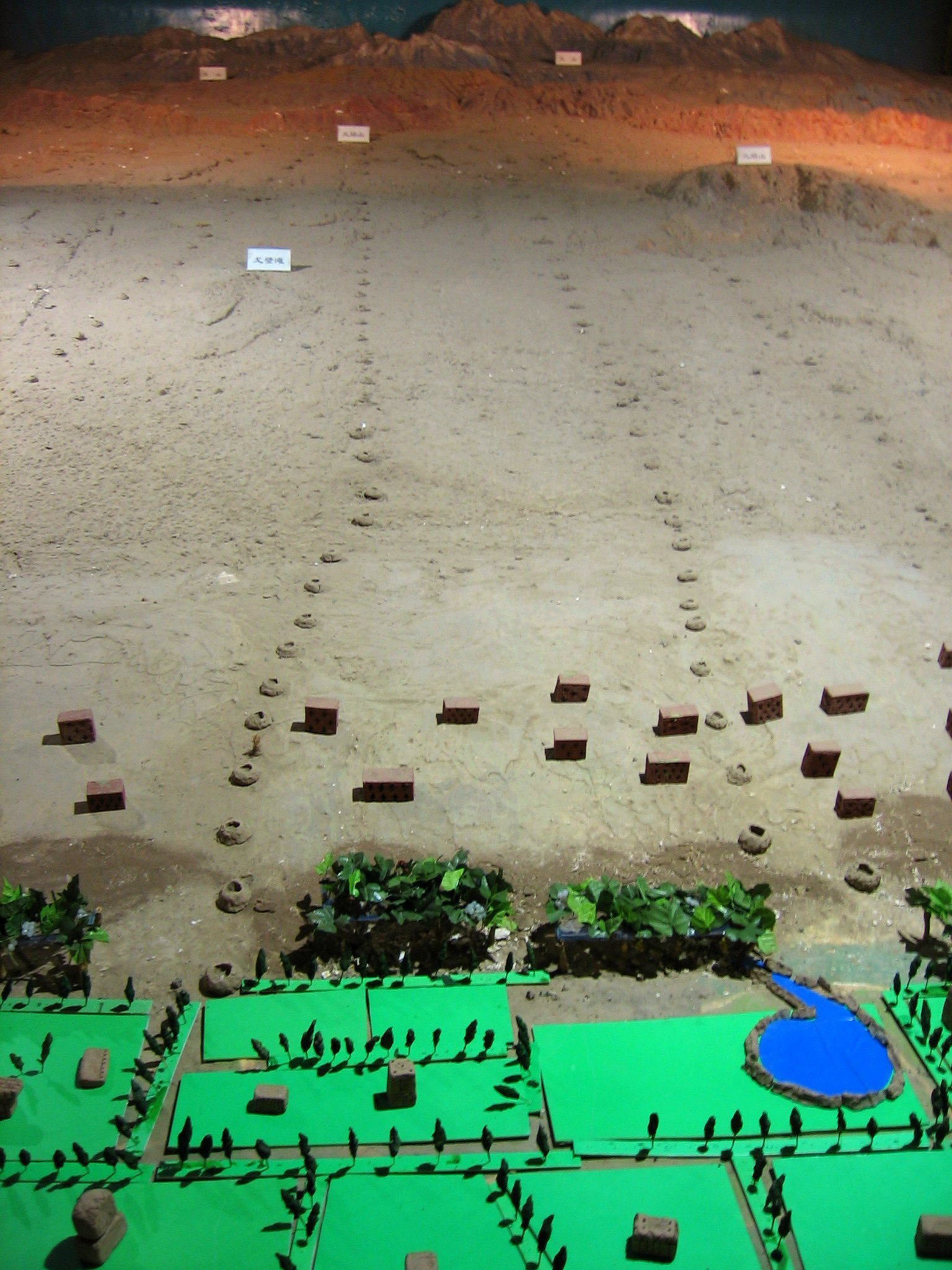
A model of the Turpan karez water system in Turpan Karez Paradise (museum): Water is collected from mountains and channeled underground to agriculture fields.

The Turpan water system, also called the Turfan kārēz system, is used for water supply via a vertical tunnel in the Turpan Depression of Xinjiang, China. "Karez" (lit. 'well') is a word in the local Uyghur language that is derived from the word in the Persian language for the system from which it is derived: kārīz. Turpan has the Turpan Karez Paradise (a Protected Area of the People's Republic of China), which is dedicated to demonstrating its karez water system, as well as exhibiting other historical artifacts.

Turpan's karez well system was crucial in Turpan's development as an important oasis stopover on the Silk Road, which skirted the barren and hostile Taklamakan Desert.

== Description ==
The karez water system is made up of a network of interconnected wells.

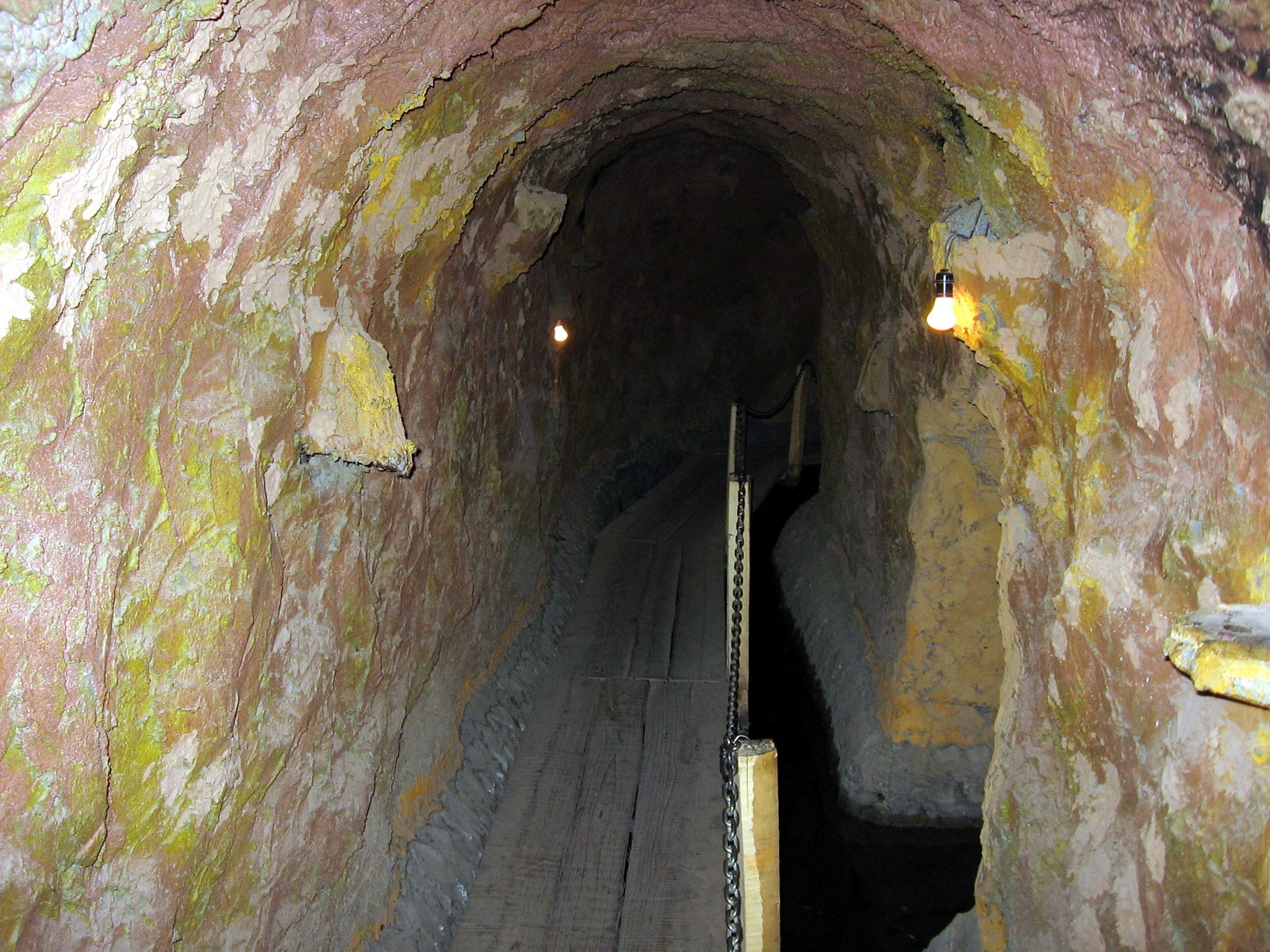
Karez gallery near Turpan, Xinjiang, China

Turpan's karez water system is made up of a horizontal series of vertically dug wells that are then linked by underground water canals to collect water from the watershed surface runoff from the base of the Tian Shan Mountains and the nearby Flaming Mountains. The canals channel the water to the surface, taking advantage of the current provided by the gravity of the downward slope of the Turpan Depression. The canals are mostly underground to reduce water evaporation and to make the slope long enough to reach far distances being only gravity fed.

The system has wells, dams and underground canals built to store the water and control the amount of water flow. Vertical wells are dug at various points to tap into the groundwater flowing down sloping land from the source, the mountain runoff. The water is then channeled through underground canals dug from the bottom of one well to the next well and then to the desired destination. Turpan's karez irrigation system of special connected wells is believed to be of indigenous origin in China, perhaps combined with technology arriving from more western regions.

In Xinjiang, the greatest number of karez wells are in the Turpan Depression, where today there remain over 1100 karez wells and channels having a total length of over 5,000 kilometres (3,100 mi). The local geography makes karez wells practical for agricultural irrigation and other uses. Turpan is located in the second deepest geographical depression in the world, with over 4,000 km^{2} (1,500 sq mi) of land below sea level and with soil that forms a sturdy basin. Water naturally flows down from the nearby mountains during the rainy season in an underground current to the low depression basin under the desert. The Turpan summer is very hot and dry with periods of wind and blowing sand.

== Importance ==
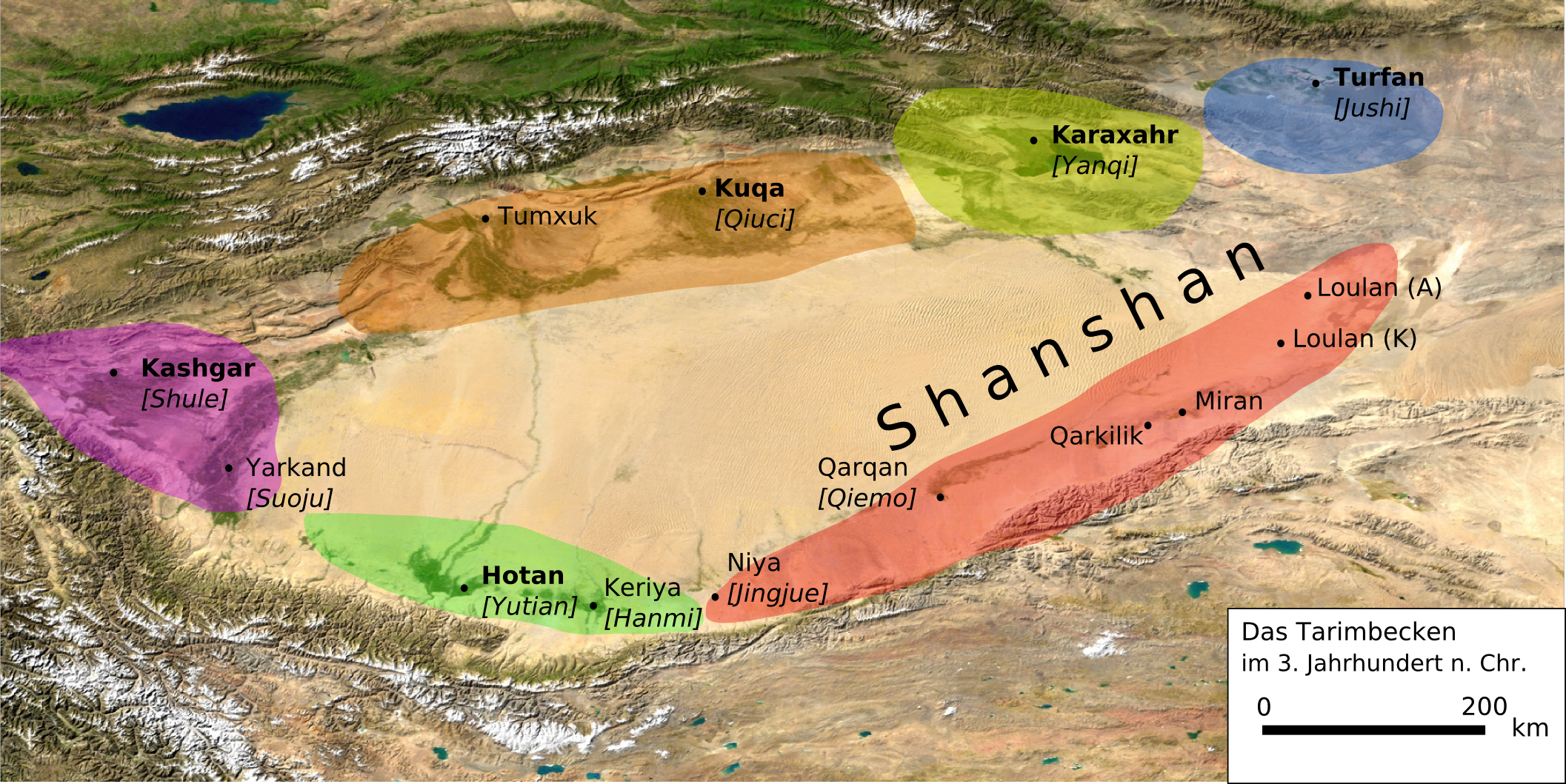
Map showing location of Turpan (upper right) on the Silk Road

Ample water was crucial to Turpan, so that the oasis city could service the many caravans on the Silk Route resting there near a route skirting the Taklamakan Desert. The caravans included merchant traders and missionaries with their armed escorts, animals including camels, sometimes numbering into the thousands, along with camel drivers, agents and other personnel, all of whom might stay for a week or more. The caravans needed pastures for their animals, resting facilities, trading bazaars for conducting business and replenishment of food and water.

== Potential UNESCO World Heritage Site ==
Karez wells in the Turfan area are on the UNESCO World Heritage Sites Tentative List for China.

== Threatened by global warming ==
There are 20,000 glaciers in Xinjiang – nearly half of all the glaciers in China. The water from the glaciers via the underground channels has provided a stable water source year round, independent of season, for thousands of years. But since the 1950s, Xinjiang's glaciers have retreated by between 21 percent to 27 percent due to global warming, threatening the agricultural productivity of the region.

== See also ==
- Qanat – Water supply system developed in ancient Iran
- Taklamakan Desert – Desert in Xinjiang, China
- Tarim Basin – Endorheic basin in Xinjiang, China
- Cities along the Silk Road
