= Turpan =

Prefecture-level city in Xinjiang, China

Turpan: 吐鲁番市 (Chinese); تۇرپان شەھىرى (Uyghur); Turfan
- Prefecture-level city
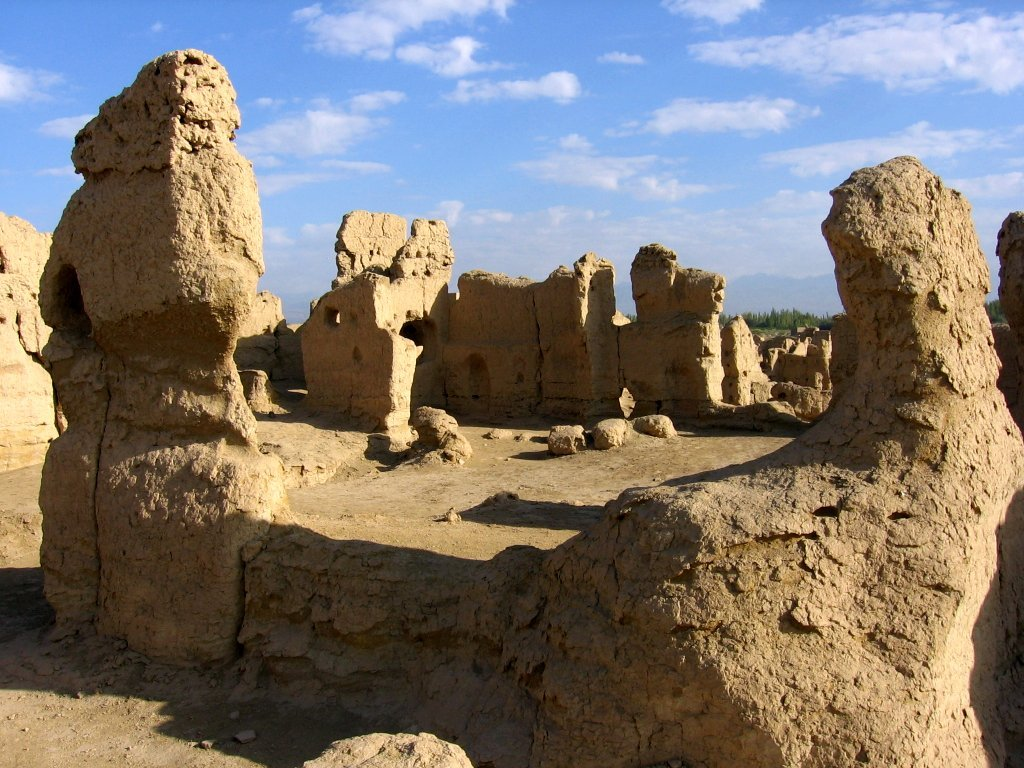
- Jiaohe Ruins

- Turpan (red) in Xinjiang (orange)

- Location of the city center in Xinjiang Turpan (China)
- Coordinates (Turpan municipal government): 42°57′04″N 89°11′22″E
- Country: China
- Region: Xinjiang
- County-level divisions: 3
- Prefecture seat: Gaochang District

Area
  - Prefecture-level city: 69,759 km^{2} (26,934 sq mi)
  - Urban: 13,650 km^{2} (5,270 sq mi)
- Elevation: 30 m (98 ft)
- Lowest elevation (Ayding Lake): −154 m (−505 ft)

Population (2020)
  - Prefecture-level city: 693,988
  - Density: 9.9484/km^{2} (25.766/sq mi)
  - Urban: 317,443
  - Urban density: 23.26/km^{2} (60.23/sq mi)

Demographics
  - Major ethnic groups: 77% Uyghurs; 16.8% Han Chinese; 5.9% Hui

GDP
  - Prefecture-level city: CN¥ 31.0 billion US$ 4.7 billion
  - Per capita: CN¥ 49,279; US$ 7,180
- Time zone: UTC+8 (China Standard)
- ISO 3166 code: CN-XJ-04
- Climate: BWk
- Website: Turpan Prefecture-level city Government

Turpan

Chinese name
- Simplified Chinese: 吐鲁番
- Traditional Chinese: 吐魯番
Transcriptions
Standard Mandarin
- Hanyu Pinyin: Tǔlǔfān
- Wade–Giles: Tʻu^{3}-lu^{3}-fan^{1}

Uyghur name
- Uyghur: تۇرپان
Transcriptions
- Latin Yëziqi: Turpan
- Yengi Yeziⱪ: Turpan
- SASM/GNC: Turpan
- Siril Yëziqi: Турпан

Turpan (Uyghur: تۇرپان) or Turfan (Chinese: 吐鲁番) is a prefecture-level city located in the east of the autonomous region of Xinjiang, China. It has an area of 69,759 km^{2} (26,934 sq mi) and a population of 693,988 (2020). The historical center of the prefectural area has shifted a number of times, from Yar-Khoto (Jiaohe, 10 km or 6.2 mi to the west of modern Turpan) to Qocho (Gaochang, 30 km or 19 mi to the southeast of Turpan) and to Turpan itself.

== Names ==
Historically, many settlements in the Tarim Basin, being situated between Chinese, Turkic, Mongolian, and Persian language users, have a number of cognate names. Turpan or Turfan is one such example. The original name of the city is unknown. The form Turfan, while older than Turpan, was not used until the middle of the 2nd millennium CE and its use became widespread only in the post-Mongol period.

== History ==
Turpan has long been the centre of a fertile oasis (with water provided by the karez canal system) and an important trade centre. It was historically located along the Silk Road. At that time, other kingdoms of the region included Korla and Yanqi.

Along with city-states such as Krorän (Loulan) and Kucha, Turpan was inhabited by people speaking the Indo-European Tocharian languages up to at least the 8th century AD. Manuscripts from the 5th to the 8th century AD shows that the Tocharian A (Turfanian, Agnean, or East Tocharian; natively ārśi) of Qarašähär (ancient Agni, Chinese Yanqi and Sanskrit Agni) and Turpan (ancient Turfan and Xočo) was used in the region for administration and religious texts.

The Jushi Kingdom ruled the area in the 1st millennium BC, until it was conquered by the Chinese Han dynasty in 107 BC. It was subdivided into two kingdoms in 60 BC, between the Han and its enemy the Xiongnu Empire. The city changed hands several times between the Xiongnu and the Han, interspersed with short periods of independence. Nearer Jushi has been linked to the Turpan Oasis, while Further Jushi to the north of the mountains near modern Jimsar.

After the fall of the Han dynasty in 220, the region was virtually independent but tributary to various dynasties. Until the 5th century AD, the capital of this kingdom was Jiaohe (modern Yarghul 16 kilometres (9.9 mi) west of Turpan).

Many Han Chinese along with Sogdians settled in Turfan during the post Han dynasty era. The Chinese character dominated Turfan in the eyes of the Sogdians. Kuchean speakers made up the original inhabitants before the Chinese and Sogdian influx. The oldest evidence of the use of Chinese characters was found in Turfan in a document dated to 273 AD.

In 327, the Gaochang Commandery (jùn) was created in the Turfan area by the Former Liang under Zhang Jun. The Chinese set up a military colony/garrison and organized the land into multiple divisions. Han Chinese colonists from the Hexi region and the central plains also settled in the region. Gaochang was successively ruled by the Former Liang, Former Qin and Northern Liang.

In 439, remnants of the Northern Liang, led by Juqu Wuhui and Juqu Anzhou, fled to Gaochang where they would hold onto power until 460 when they were conquered by the Rouran Khaganate.

=== Gaochang Kingdom ===
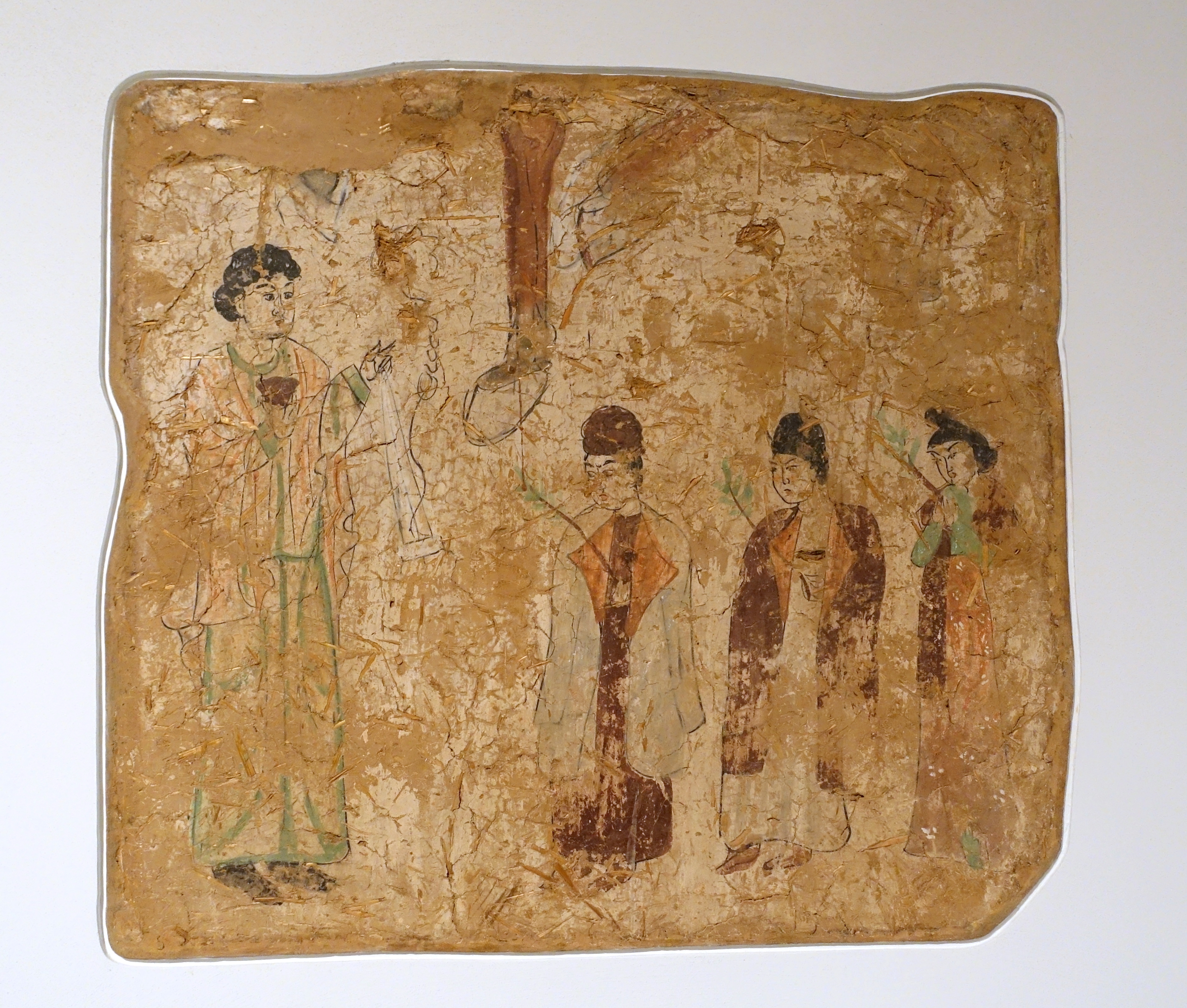
Wall painting from a Christian church, Qocho (Gaochang) 683–770 CE

At the time of its conquest by the Rouran Khaganate, there were more than ten thousand Han Chinese households in Gaochang. The Rouran Khaganate, which was based in Mongolia, appointed a Han Chinese named Kan Bozhou to rule as King of Gaochang in 460, and it became a separate vassal kingdom of the Khaganate. Kan was dependent on Rouran backing. Yicheng and Shougui were the last two kings of the Chinese Kan family to rule Gaochang.

At this time the Gaoche was rising to challenge power of the Rouran in the Tarim Basin. The Gaoche king Afuzhiluo killed King Kan Shougui, who was the nephew of Kan Bozhou. and appointed a Han from Dunhuang, named Zhang Mengming (張孟明), as his own vassal King of Gaochang. Gaochang thus passed under Gaoche rule.

Later, Zhang Mengming was killed in an uprising by the people of Gaochang and replaced by Ma Ru (馬儒). In 501, Ma Ru himself was overthrown and killed, and the people of Gaochang appointed Qu Jia (麴嘉) from Jincheng Commandery as their king. Qu Jia at first pledged allegiance to the Rouran, but the Rouran khaghan was soon killed by the Gaoche and he had to submit to Gaoche overlordship. Later, when the Göktürks emerged as the supreme power in the region, the Qu dynasty of Gaochang became vassals of the Göktürks.

While the material civilization of Kucha to its west in this period remained chiefly Indo-Iranian in character, in Gaochang it gradually merged into the Tang aesthetics. Qu Wentai, King of Gaochang, was a main patron of the Tang pilgrim and traveller Xuanzang.

=== Tang conquest ===
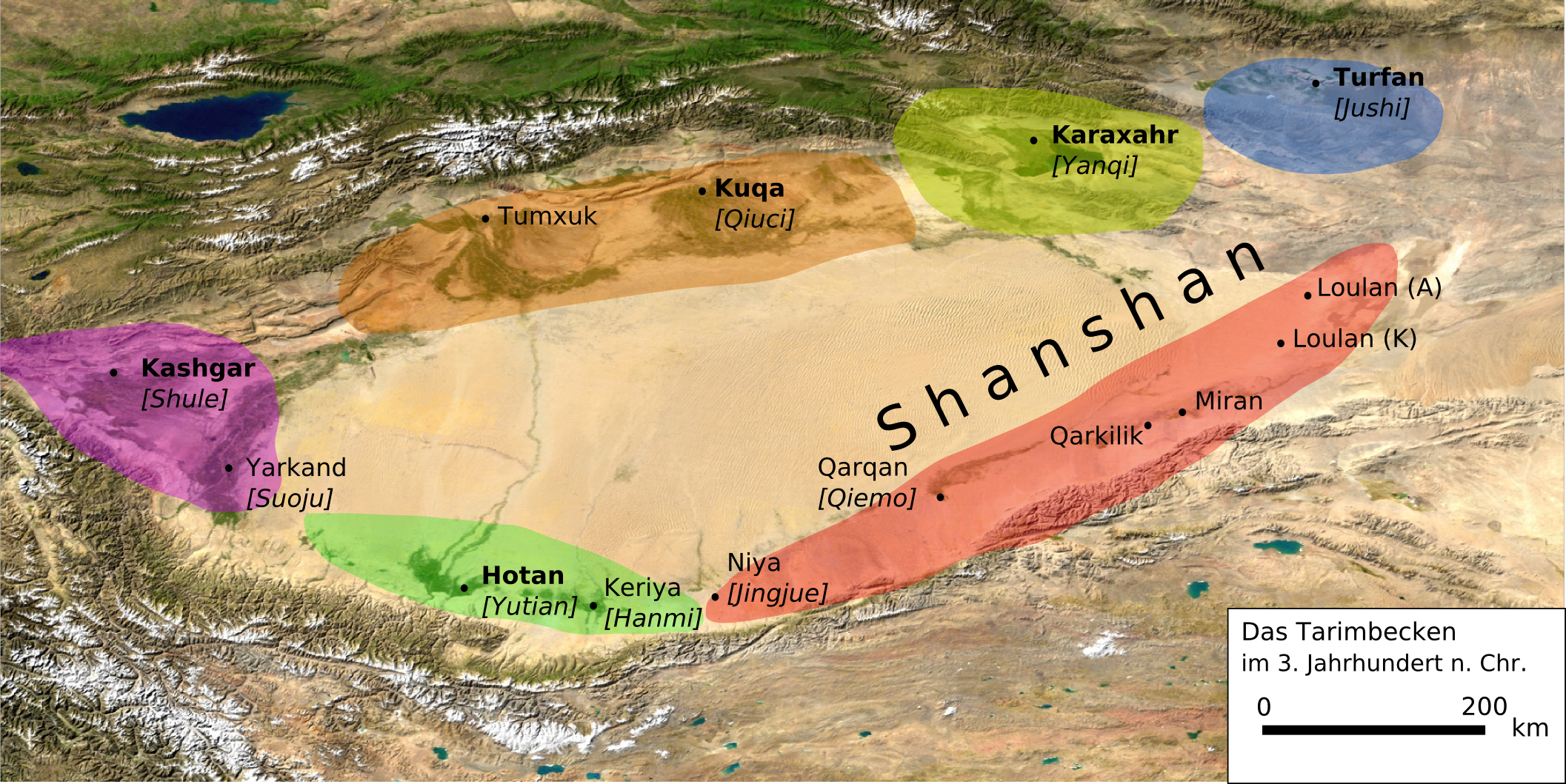
Tarim Basin in the 3rd century

The Tang dynasty had reconquered the Tarim Basin by the 7th century AD and for the next three centuries the Tibetan Empire, the Tang dynasty, and the Turks fought over dominion of the Tarim Basin. Sogdians and Chinese engaged in extensive commercial activities with each other under Tang rule. The Sogdians were mostly Mazdaist at this time. The Turpan region was renamed Xi Prefecture (西州) when the Tang conquered it in 640 AD, had a history of commerce and trade along the Silk Road already centuries old; it had many inns catering to merchants and other travelers, while numerous brothels are recorded in Kucha and Khotan. According to Valerie Hansen, even before the Tang conquest, Han ethnic presence was already so extensive that the cultural alignment of the city led to Turpan's name in the Sogdian language becoming known as "Chinatown" or "Town of the Chinese". As late as the tenth century, the Persian source Hudud Al-Alam continued to refer to the town as Chīnanjkanth (Chinese town).

In Astana Cemetery, a contract written in Sogdian detailing the sale of a Sogdian girl to a Chinese man was discovered dated to 639 AD. Individual slaves were common among silk route houses; early documents recorded an increase in the selling of slaves in Turpan. Twenty-one 7th-century marriage contracts were found that showed, where one Sogdian spouse was present, for 18 of them their partner was a Sogdian. The only Sogdian men who married Chinese women were highly eminent officials. Several commercial interactions were recorded, for example a camel was sold priced at 14 silk bolts in 673, and a Chang'an native bought a girl age 11 for 40 silk bolts in 731 from a Sogdian merchant. Five men swore that the girl was never free before enslavement, since the Tang Code forbade commoners to be sold as slaves.

The Tang dynasty became weakened considerably due to the An Lushan Rebellion, and the Tibetans took the opportunity to expand into Gansu and the Western Regions. The Tibetans took control of Turfan in 792.

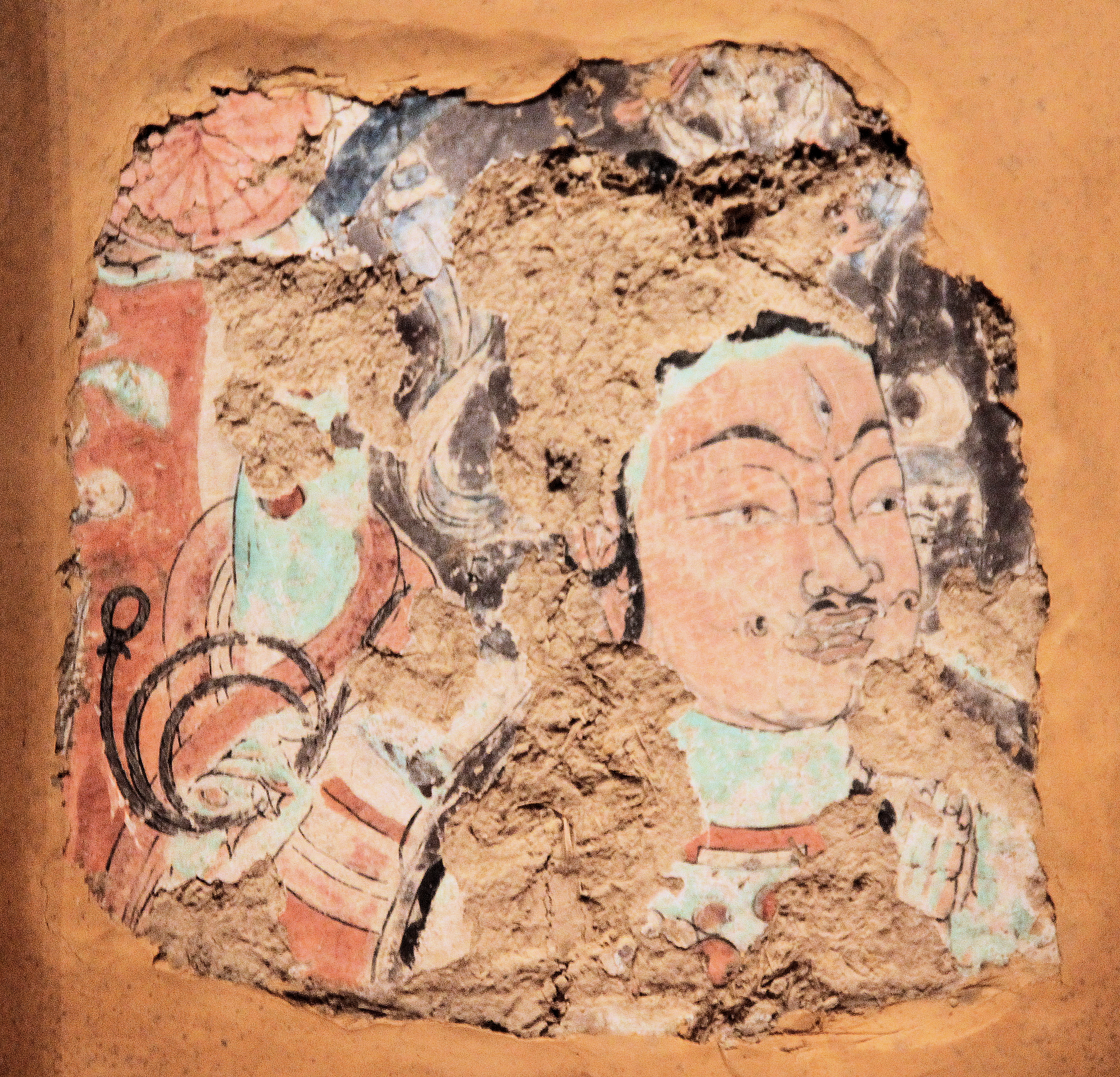
Maheshvara, Turpan, 10th–12th century

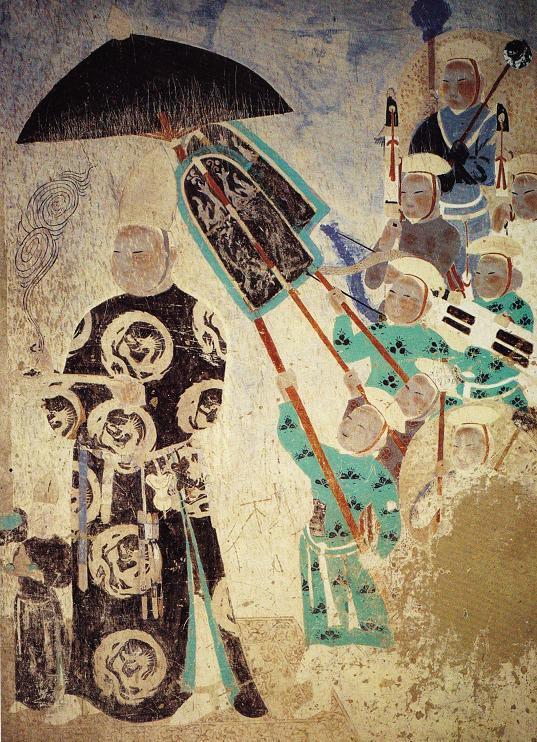
Buddhist Uyghur king from Turpan attended by servants. Depicted in Dunhuang Mogao Caves, Western Xia dynasty.

Clothing for corpses was made out of discarded, used paper in Turfan which is why the Astana graveyard is a source of a plethora of texts.

Seventh or 8th century dumplings and wontons were found in Turfan.

=== Uyghur rule ===
In 803, the Uyghurs of the Uyghur Khaganate seized Turfan from the Tibetans. The Uyghur Khaganate however was destroyed by the Kirghiz and its capital Ordu-Baliq in Mongolia sacked in 840. The defeat resulted in the mass movement of the Uyghurs out of Mongolia and their dispersal into Gansu and Central Asia, and many joined other Uyghurs already present in Turfan. In the early twentieth century, a collection of some 900 Christian manuscripts dating to the ninth to the twelfth centuries was found by the German Turfan expeditions at a monastery site at Turfan.

==== Idikut kingdom ====
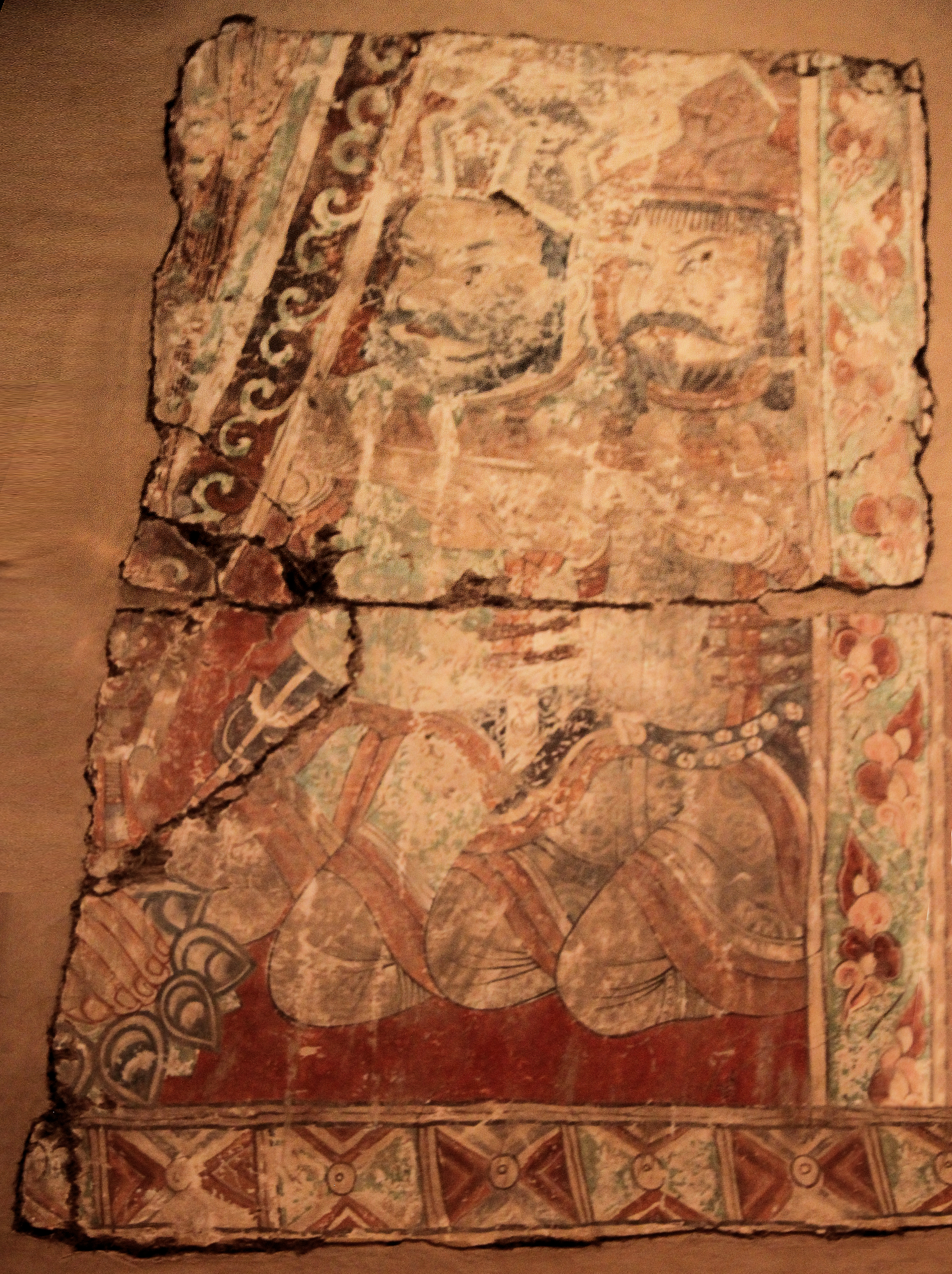
Pranidhi scene, Turpan, 10th–12th century.

The Uyghurs established a Kingdom in the Turpan region with its capital in Gaochang or Kara-Khoja. The kingdom was known as the Uyghuria Idikut state or Kara-Khoja Kingdom that lasted from 856 to 1389 AD. The Uyghurs were Manichaean but later converted to Buddhism and funded the construction of cave temples in the Bezeklik Caves. The Uyghurs formed an alliance with the rulers of Dunhuang. The Uyghur state later became a vassal state of the Kara-Khitans and then as a vassal of the Mongol Empire. This Kingdom was led by the Idikuts or Saint Spiritual Rulers. The last Idikut left Turpan area in 1284 for Kumul and then Gansu to seek protection of the Yuan dynasty, but local Uyghur Buddhist rulers still held power until the invasion by the Moghul Khizr Khoja in 1389.

==== Turfan expeditions ====
German scientists conducted archaeological expeditions, known as the German Turfan expeditions, at the beginning of the 20th century (between 1902 and 1914). They discovered paintings and other art treasures that were transported to the Museum of Asian Art in Berlin.

Artifacts of Manichaean and Buddhist provenance were also found in Turfan. During World War II, many of these artifacts were destroyed or looted.

==== Turfan fragments ====
Uyghur, Persian, Sogdian and Syriac documents have been found in Turfan. Turfan also has documents in Middle Persian.

All these are known as the Turfan fragments. They comprise a collection of over 40,000 manuscripts and manuscript fragments in 16 different languages and 26 different typefaces in different book forms. They are in the custody of the Berlin State Library where their study continues.

These writings deal with Buddhist as well as Christian-Nestorian, Manichaean and secular contents. The approximately 8,000 Old Turkic Buddhist texts make up the largest part of this.

A whole series of Sogdian Buddhist scriptures were found in Turpan (and also in Dunhuang), but these date from the Tang dynasty (618–907) and are translations from Chinese. Earlier Sogdian Buddhist texts could not be found.

Christian texts exist mainly in Syriac and Sogdian, but also as Syriac-Sogdian bilinguals (bilingual texts), as well as some Turkish-Nestorian fragments. They include fragments of Sogdian translations of works by Isaac the Syrian.

Manichaean texts survive in Middle Persian, Parthian, Sogdian and Uyghur; the Sogdian and Uyghur documents show a notable adaptation to Buddhism, but there is also evidence of a reverse influence.

Important parts of the Gospel of Mani were found here, for example. Also, parts of the Arzhang (Book of Pictures), one of the holy books of Manichaeism were discovered.

Most of the Buddhist texts survive in only fragmentary form. There are several Indian Sanskrit texts from various schools of Mahayana and Hinayana, Uyghur texts that are mostly translations from Sanskrit, Tocharian and, starting in the 9th century, increasingly from the Chinese.

Many of the Uyghur documents and fragments of Buddhist scriptures edited to date include didactic texts (sutras) and philosophical works (the abhidharma). In contrast to the other Buddhist contents, the monastic discipline texts (the vinaya) did not seem to be translated, but rather taught and studied in Sanskrit.

=== Conversion to Islam ===
The conversion of the local Buddhist population to Islam was completed in the second half of the 15th century.

After being converted, the descendants of the previously Buddhist Uyghurs in Turfan failed to retain memory of their ancestral legacy and falsely believed that the "infidel Kalmuks" (Dzungars) were the ones who built Buddhist monuments in their area.

=== 15th and 16th centuries ===
Buddhist images and temples in Turfan were described in 1414 by the Ming diplomat Chen Cheng.

As late as 1420, the Timurid envoy Ghiyāth al-dīn Naqqāsh, who passed through Turpan on the way from Herat to Beijing, reported that many of the city's residents were "infidels". He visited a "very large and beautiful" temple with a statue of Shakyamuni; in one of the versions of his account it was also claimed that many Turpanians "worshipped the cross".

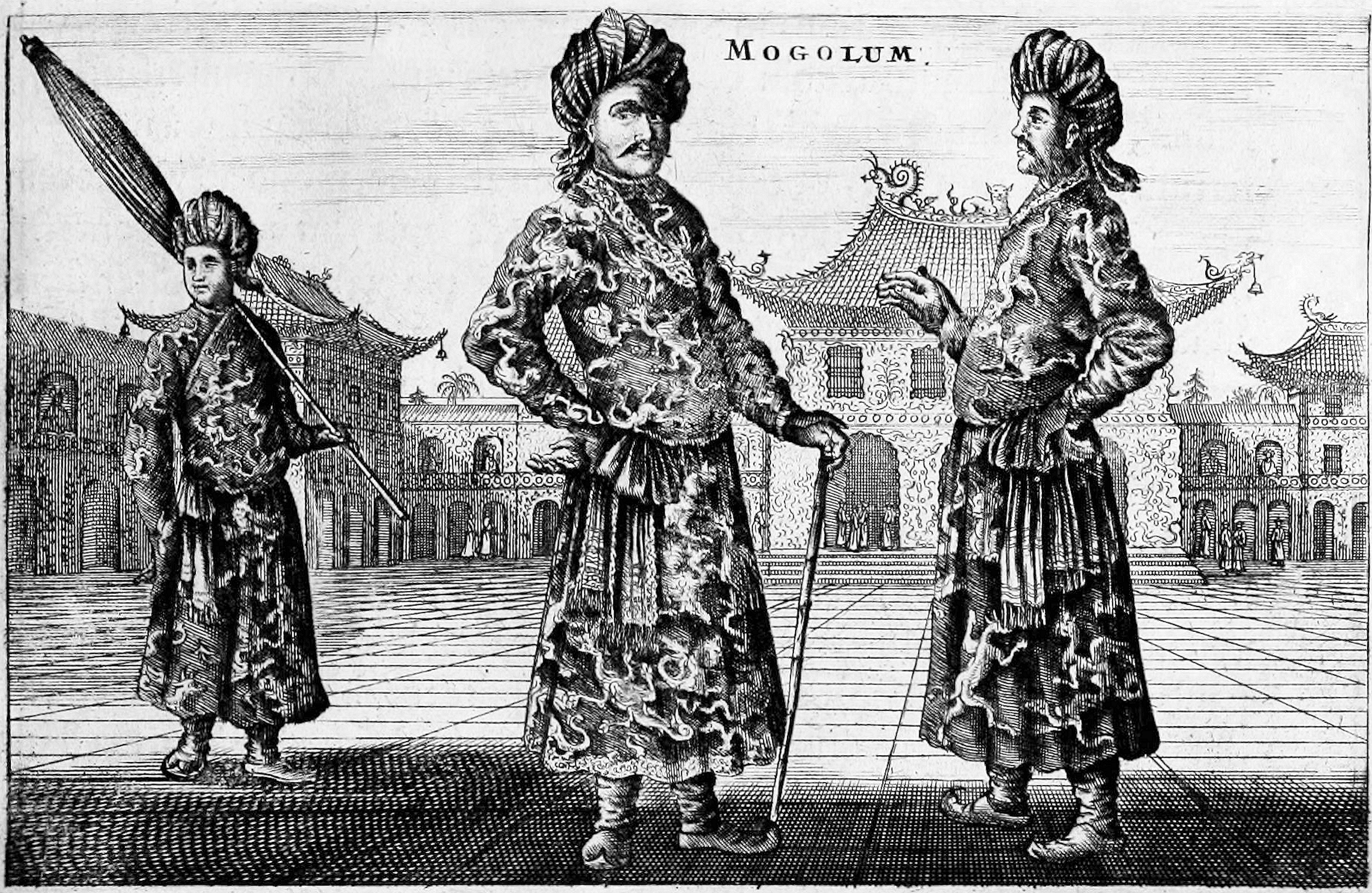
"Mughal embassy", seen by the Dutch visitors in Beijing in 1656. According to Lach & Kley (1993), modern historians (namely, Luciano Petech) think that the emissaries portrayed had come from Turpan, rather than all the way from the Moghul India.

The Moghul ruler of Turpan Yunus Khan, also known as Ḥājjī 'Ali (ruled 1462–1478), unified Moghulistan (roughly corresponding to today's Eastern Xinjiang) under his authority in 1472. Around that time, a conflict with the Ming China started over the issues of tribute trade: Turpanians benefited from sending "tribute missions" to China, which allowed them to receive valuable gifts from the Ming emperors and to do plenty of trading on the side; the Chinese, however, felt that receiving and entertaining these missions was just too expensive. (Muslim envoys to the early Ming China were impressed by the lavish reception offered to them along their route through China, from Suzhou to Beijing, such as described by Ghiyāth al-dīn Naqqāsh in 1420–1421.)

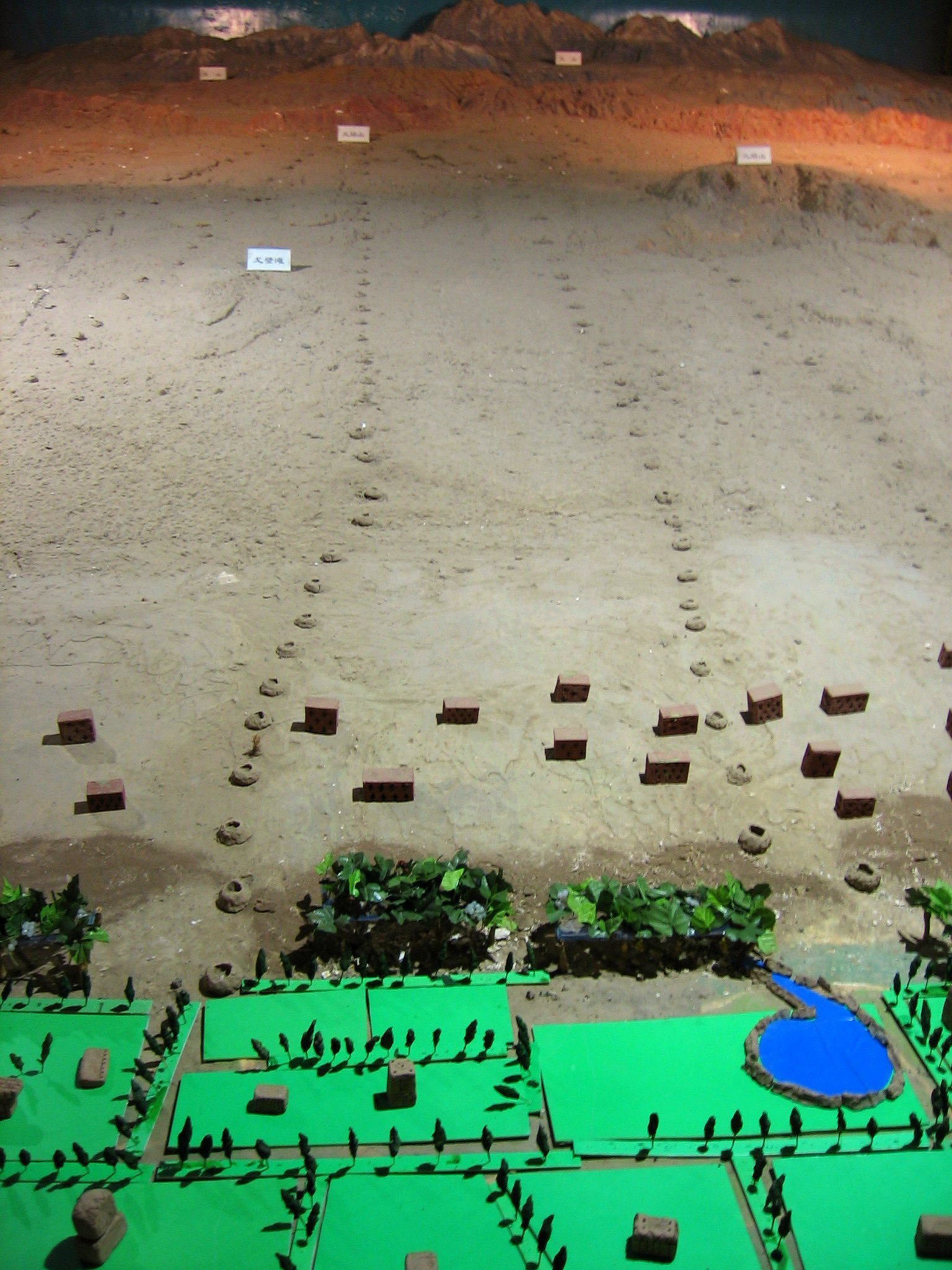
A model of the Turpan water system, (karez) in the Turpan Water Museum: Water is collected from mountains and channeled underground to grape vineyards.

Yunus Khan was irritated by the restrictions on the frequency and size of Turpanian missions (no more than one mission in 5 years, with no more than 10 members) imposed by the Ming government in 1465 and by the Ming's refusal to bestow sufficiently luxurious gifts on his envoys (1469). Accordingly, in 1473 he went to war against China, and succeeded in capturing Hami in 1473 from the Oirat Mongol Henshen and holding it for a while, until Ali was repulsed by the Ming dynasty into Turfan. He reoccupied Hami after Ming left. Henshen's Mongols recaptured Hami twice in 1482 and 1483, but the son of Ali, Ahmad Alaq, who ruled Eastern Moghulistan or Turpan Khanate, reconquered it in 1493 and captured the Hami leader and the resident of China in Hami (Hami was a vassal state to Ming). In response, the Ming dynasty imposed an economic blockade on Turfan and kicked out all the Uyghurs from Gansu. It became so harsh for Turfan that Ahmed left. Ahmed's son Mansur succeeded him and took over Hami in 1517. These conflicts were called the Ming–Turpan conflict.

Several times, after occupying Hami, Mansur tried to attack China in 1524 with 20,000 men, but was beaten by Chinese forces. The Turpan kingdom under Mansur, in alliance with Oirat Mongols, tried to raid Suzhou in Gansu in 1528, but were severely defeated by Ming Chinese forces and suffered heavy casualties. The Chinese refused to lift the economic blockade and restrictions that had led to the battles and continued restricting Turpan's tribute and trade with China. Turfan also annexed Hami.

=== 18th and 19th centuries ===
The Imin mosque of Turfan was built in 1779.

Francis Younghusband visited Turpan in 1887 on his overland journey from Beijing to India. He said it consisted of two walled towns, a Chinese one with a population of no more than 5,000 and, about a mile (1.6 km) to the west, a Turk town of "probably" 12,000 to 15,000 inhabitants. The town (presumably the "Turk town") had four gateways, one for each of the cardinal directions, of solid brickwork and massive wooden doors plated with iron and covered by a semicircular bastion. The well-kept walls were of mud and about 35 ft (10.7 m) tall and 20 to 30 feet (6 to 9 m) thick, with loopholes at the top. There was a level space about 15 yards (14 m) wide outside the main walls surrounded by a musketry wall about 8 ft (2.4 m) high, with a ditch around it some 12 ft (3.7 m) deep and 20 ft (6 m) wide. There were drumtowers over the gateways, small square towers at the corners and two small square bastions between the corners and the gateways, "two to each front". Wheat, cotton, poppies, melons and grapes were grown in the surrounding fields.

Turpan grapes impressed other travelers to the region as well. The 19th-century Russian explorer Grigory Grum-Grshimailo, thought the local raisins may be "the best in the world" and noted the buildings of a "perfectly peculiar design" used for drying them called chunche.

Mongols, Chinese and Chantos all lived in Turfan during this period.

=== 20th and 21st centuries ===
In 1931, a Uyghur rebellion broke out in the region, after a Chinese commander tried to forcibly marry a local girl. The Chinese responded by indiscriminately attacking Muslims; this turned the entire countryside against the Chinese administration and the Uyghurs, Kazakhs, Kyrgyz and Tungans joined the rebels.

On 19 August 1981, Deng Xiaoping conducted an inspection in Turpan Prefecture.

On 31 March 1995, Turpan and Dunhuang became sister cities.

== Geography ==
=== Subdivisions ===
Turpan directly controls one district and two counties.

Map
#	Name	Chinese characters	Hanyu Pinyin	Uyghur (UEY)	Uyghur Latin (ULY)	Population (2020 Census)	Area (km^{2})	Density (/km^{2})
1	Gaochang District	高昌区	Gāochāng Qū	قاراھوجا رايونى	Qarahoja Rayoni	317,443	13,651	23.25
2	Shanshan County	鄯善县	Shànshàn Xiàn	پىچان ناھىيىسى	Pichan Nahiyisi	242,310	39,547	6.13
3	Toksun County	托克逊县	Tuōkèxùn Xiàn	توقسۇن ناھىيىسى	Toqsun Nahiyisi	134,235	16,561	8.11

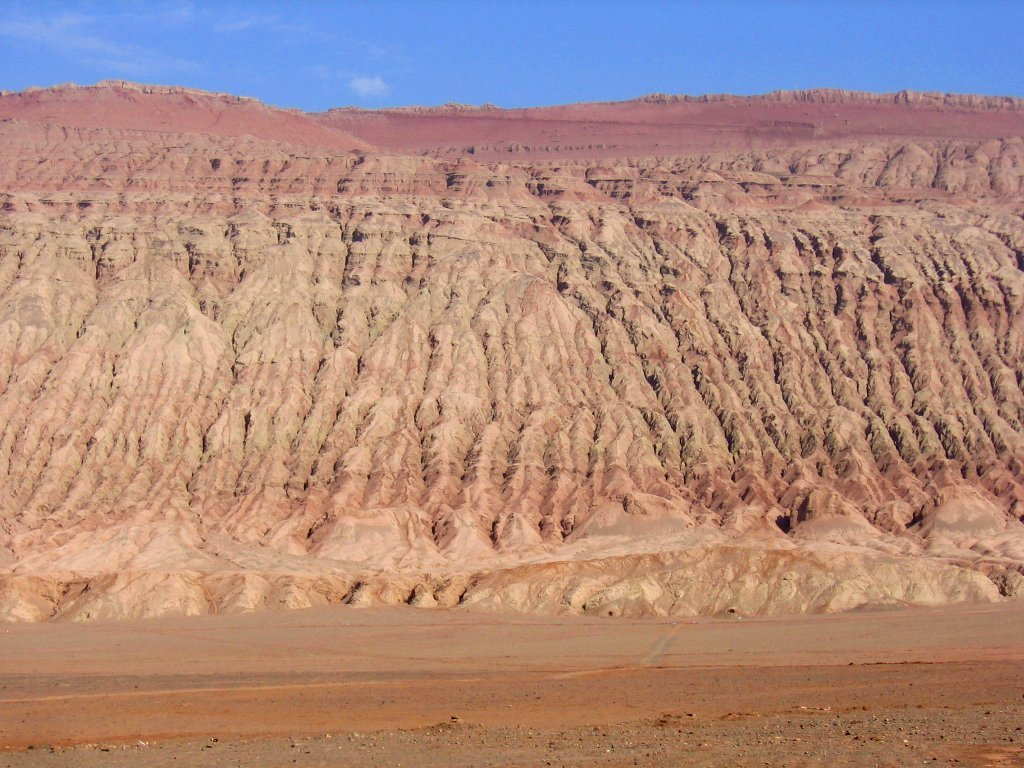
View of the "Flaming Mountains"

Turpan is located about 150 km (93 mi) southeast of Ürümqi, Xinjiang's capital, in a mountain basin, on the northern side of the Turpan Depression, at an elevation of 30 m (98 ft) above sea level. Outside of Turpan is a small volcanic cone, the Turfan volcano, that is said to have erupted in 1120 as described in the Song dynasty. In June 1995, a book of standard names for local geography was published.

=== Climate ===
Turpan has an extremely continental desert climate (Köppen Climate Classification BWk. Trewartha BWho), with long, extremely hot summers (resembling a hot desert climate or BWh) and somewhat short but very cold winters, with very brief spring and autumn in between. Annual precipitation is very low, amounting to only 15.7 millimetres (0.62 in). The monthly 24-hour average temperature ranges from −6.7 °C (19.9 °F) in January to 33.1 °C (91.6 °F) in July, or a very large seasonal variation of 39.8 °C (71.6 °F); the annual mean is 15.7 °C (60.3 °F). With monthly percent possible sunshine ranging from 48% in December to 75% in September, sunshine is abundant and the city receives 2,912 hours of bright sunshine annually.

Extremes have ranged from −28.9 °C (−20 °F) to 49.1 °C (120 °F), with Turpan Dongkan station nearby having a record high of 49.8 °C (122 °F) with Sanbu to its east having recorded a national all-time record high for China at 52.2 °C (126 °F), although a reading of 49.6 °C (121 °F) in July 1975 is regarded as dubious. However, the high heat and dryness of the summer, when combined with the area's ancient system of irrigation, allows the countryside around Turpan to produce great quantities of high-quality fruit.

Climate data for Turpan, elevation 39 m (128 ft), (1991–2020 normals, extremes 1951–present)
Month	Jan	Feb	Mar	Apr	May	Jun	Jul	Aug	Sep	Oct	Nov	Dec	Year
Record high °C (°F)	8.5 (47.3)	19.5 (67.1)	31.7 (89.1)	40.9 (105.6)	43.6 (110.5)	47.6 (117.7)	49.1 (120.4)	47.8 (118.0)	43.4 (110.1)	34.3 (93.7)	23.0 (73.4)	9.6 (49.3)	49.1 (120.4)
Mean daily maximum °C (°F)	−2.3 (27.9)	7.0 (44.6)	17.9 (64.2)	27.8 (82.0)	33.9 (93.0)	38.8 (101.8)	40.5 (104.9)	39.0 (102.2)	32.6 (90.7)	22.5 (72.5)	10.3 (50.5)	−0.4 (31.3)	22.3 (72.1)
Daily mean °C (°F)	−6.7 (19.9)	1.3 (34.3)	11.6 (52.9)	20.7 (69.3)	26.6 (79.9)	31.6 (88.9)	33.1 (91.6)	31.2 (88.2)	24.6 (76.3)	14.5 (58.1)	4.4 (39.9)	−4.4 (24.1)	15.7 (60.3)
Mean daily minimum °C (°F)	−10.3 (13.5)	−3.5 (25.7)	5.9 (42.6)	14.2 (57.6)	19.8 (67.6)	24.7 (76.5)	26.5 (79.7)	24.6 (76.3)	18.4 (65.1)	9.1 (48.4)	0.3 (32.5)	−7.6 (18.3)	10.2 (50.3)
Record low °C (°F)	−34 (−29)	−24.5 (−12.1)	−20.4 (−4.7)	−3.5 (25.7)	1.8 (35.2)	10.7 (51.3)	15.1 (59.2)	11.6 (52.9)	1.3 (34.3)	−5.7 (21.7)	−17.8 (0.0)	−26.1 (−15.0)	−34 (−29)
Average precipitation mm (inches)	0.9 (0.04)	0.5 (0.02)	0.7 (0.03)	0.9 (0.04)	1.0 (0.04)	2.6 (0.10)	2.0 (0.08)	2.0 (0.08)	1.4 (0.06)	1.2 (0.05)	0.6 (0.02)	0.9 (0.04)	14.7 (0.6)
Average precipitation days (≥ 0.1 mm)	1.0	0.3	0.3	0.7	1.1	2.0	2.3	1.9	0.9	0.8	0.5	1.1	12.9
Average snowy days	2.5	0.9	0	0	0	0	0	0	0	0	0.2	2.6	6.2
Average relative humidity (%)	56	40	25	23	25	27	30	31	35	45	50	56	37
Mean monthly sunshine hours	121.8	172.0	234.2	263.7	308.4	301.6	303.3	299.6	273.5	238.6	163.7	108.2	2,788.6
Percentage possible sunshine	41	57	62	65	67	66	66	71	74	71	57	39	61
Source 1: China Meteorological Administration
Source 2: NOAAextremes

Climate data for Turpan (Dongkan Station), elevation −49 m (−161 ft), (1991–2020 normals)
Month	Jan	Feb	Mar	Apr	May	Jun	Jul	Aug	Sep	Oct	Nov	Dec	Year
Mean daily maximum °C (°F)	−1.9 (28.6)	7.6 (45.7)	18.6 (65.5)	28.5 (83.3)	34.5 (94.1)	39.3 (102.7)	40.8 (105.4)	39.3 (102.7)	33.2 (91.8)	23.2 (73.8)	10.9 (51.6)	0.0 (32.0)	22.8 (73.1)
Daily mean °C (°F)	−8.0 (17.6)	0.5 (32.9)	11.1 (52.0)	20.7 (69.3)	26.8 (80.2)	31.9 (89.4)	33.3 (91.9)	31.4 (88.5)	24.8 (76.6)	14.8 (58.6)	3.8 (38.8)	−5.7 (21.7)	15.5 (59.8)
Mean daily minimum °C (°F)	−12.8 (9.0)	−5.5 (22.1)	4.5 (40.1)	13.8 (56.8)	19.7 (67.5)	24.9 (76.8)	26.6 (79.9)	24.7 (76.5)	18.3 (64.9)	8.6 (47.5)	−1.3 (29.7)	−9.9 (14.2)	9.3 (48.8)
Average precipitation mm (inches)	0.8 (0.03)	0.4 (0.02)	0.6 (0.02)	1.0 (0.04)	1.0 (0.04)	2.5 (0.10)	2.0 (0.08)	1.9 (0.07)	1.3 (0.05)	0.9 (0.04)	0.4 (0.02)	0.6 (0.02)	13.4 (0.53)
Average precipitation days (≥ 0.1 mm)	1.0	0.3	0.3	0.8	1.0	2.1	2.4	2.1	1.0	0.6	0.4	0.8	12.8
Average snowy days	2.2	0.6	0	0	0	0	0	0	0	0	0.1	2.0	4.9
Average relative humidity (%)	56	41	26	24	25	28	32	33	34	41	48	57	37
Mean monthly sunshine hours	161.9	193.2	246.9	267.1	307.9	304.8	306.1	302.3	282.0	254.7	186.0	140.0	2,952.9
Percentage possible sunshine	55	64	66	66	67	67	67	71	77	76	65	50	66
Source: China Meteorological Administration

== Demographics ==
According to the 2015 government census, the city of Turpan had a population of 651,853 (population density 15.99 inh./km^{2}). Islam is largest religion. The breakdown by ethnicity was as follows:

2000

Nationality	Percentage
Uyghurs	70.0%
Han	23.3%
Hui	6.4%
Others	0.3%

2015

Percentage
75.0%
18.7%
6.0%
0.3%

2018

Percentage
77.0%
16.8%
5.9%
0.3%

=== Language ===
There is Chinese influence in the vocabulary of Uyghur dialect in Turpan.

=== Assimilation ===
Turpan Uyghurs have more Han Chinese features and looks than Uyghurs elsewhere and this is suggested to be due to intermarriage between Han Chinese and Uyghurs in the past according to the locals. Due to physical features found in Uyghurs in Turpan it was claimed that Uyghurs married slaves sent to Turpan's Lukchun area by the Qing according to the Manchu Ji Dachun.

== Economy ==
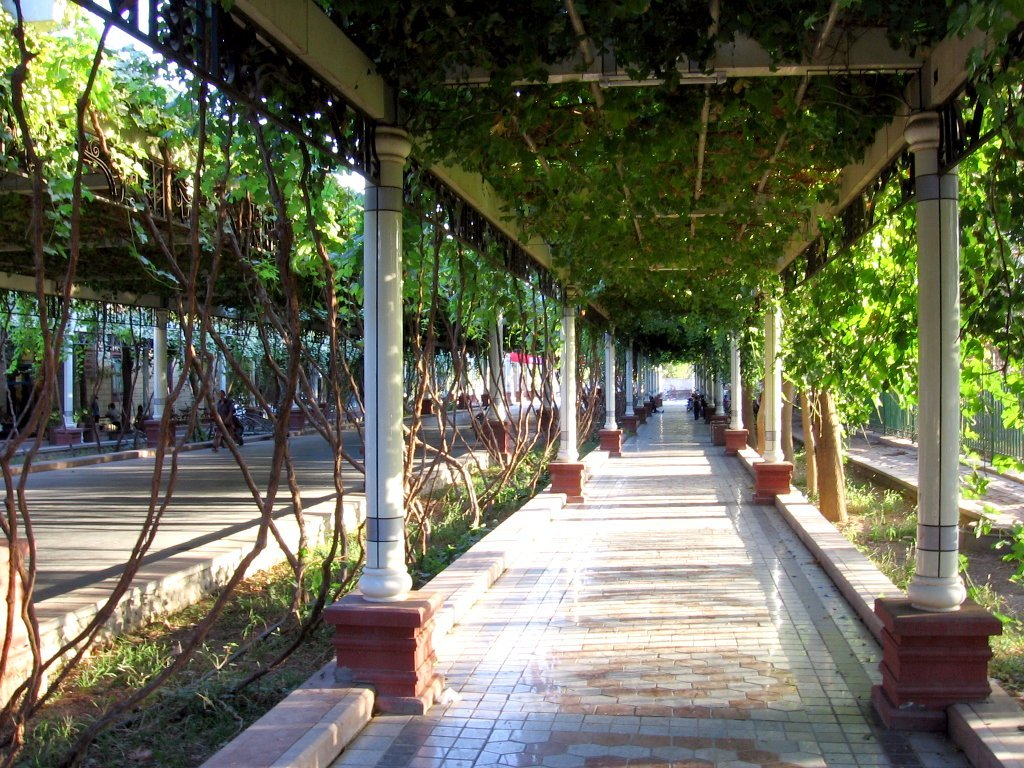
Youth Road (青年路), a Turpan street shaded by grapevine trellises

Turpan is an agricultural economy growing vegetables, cotton, and especially grapes being China's largest raisin producing area. There is a steady increase in farming acreage devoted to grapes backed by strong local government support for increased production. The local government has coordinated improvements in raisin distribution, offered preferential loans for grape cultivation, and free management training to growers. The annual Turpan Grape festival includes a mass wedding of Uyghurs funded by the government.

== Transport ==
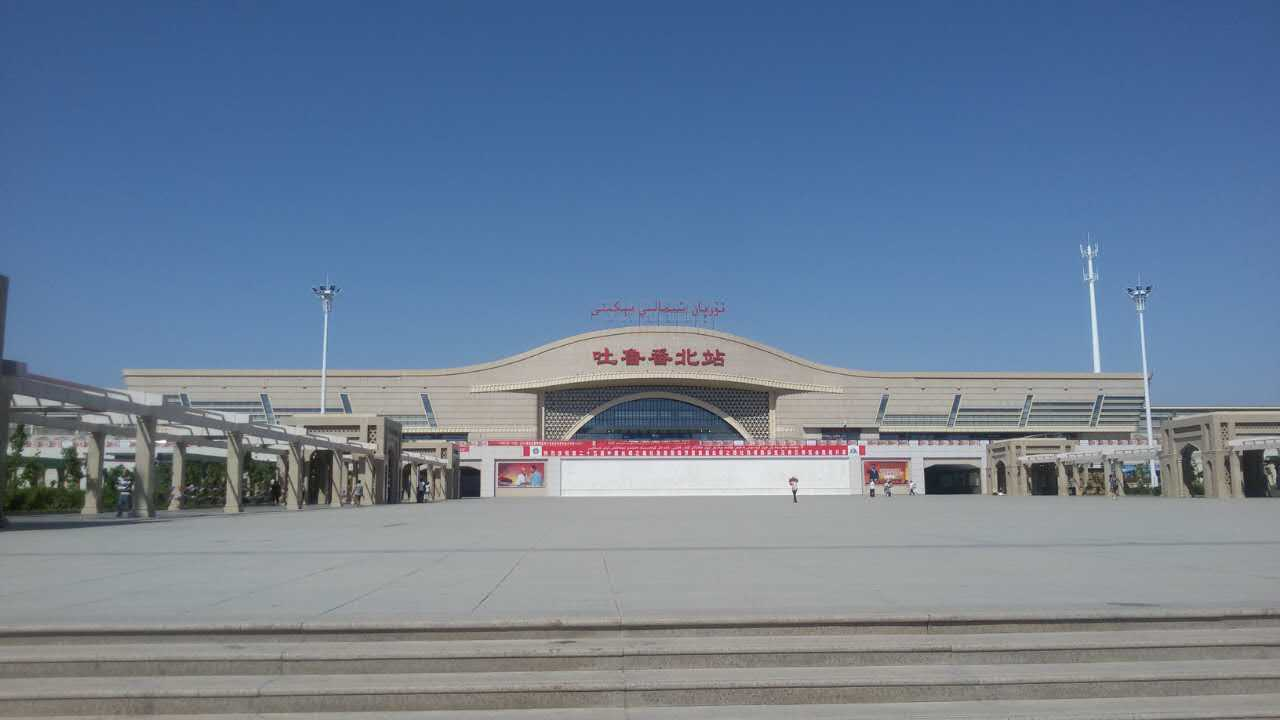
Turpan North Railway Station

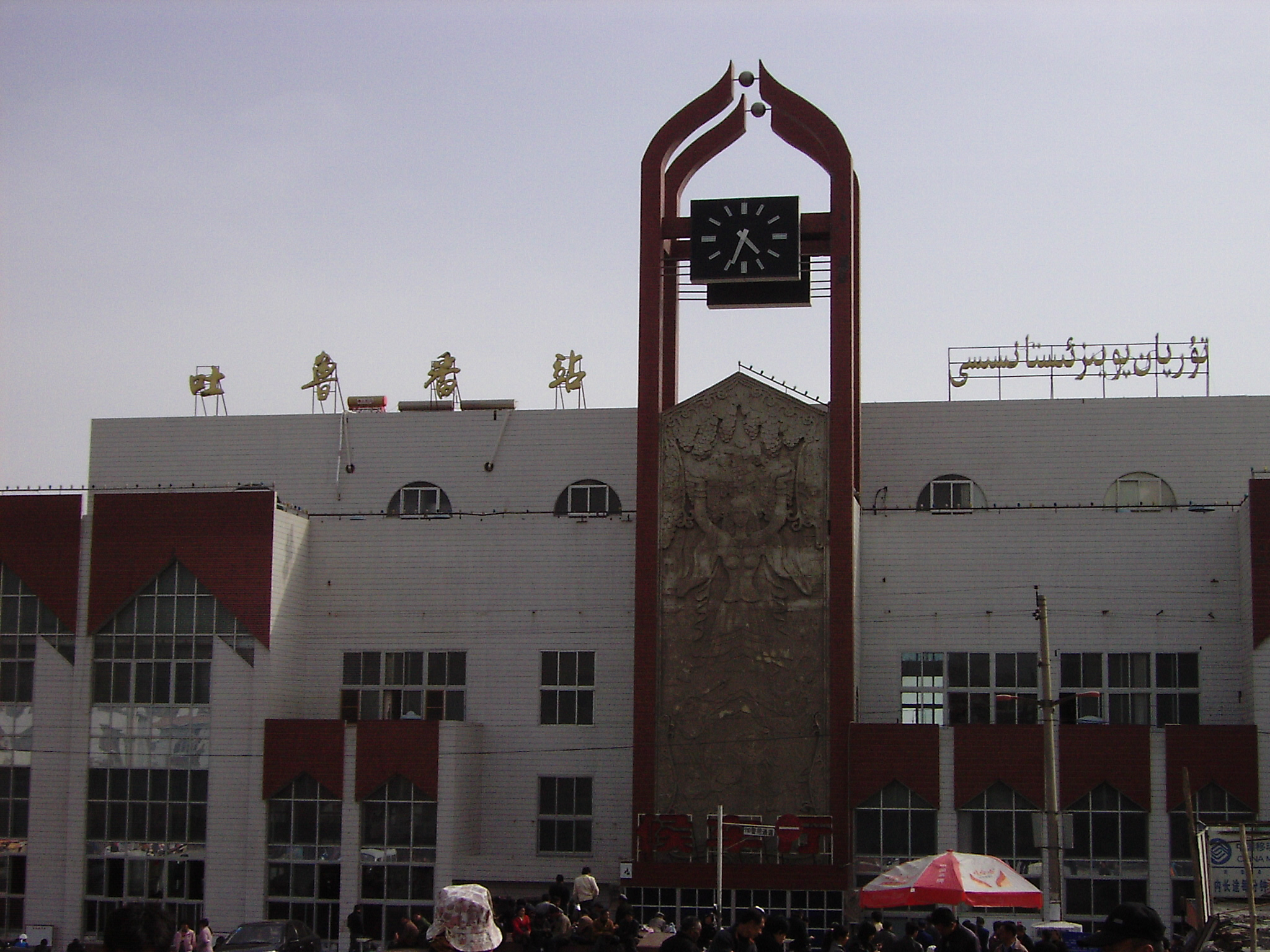
Turpan Railway Station

Turpan is served by the Lanzhou–Xinjiang High-Speed Railway through the Turpan North Railway Station. Turpan Railway Station is the junction for two conventional lines, the Lanzhou-Xinjiang and the Southern Xinjiang Railways. The Turpan Tram is currently under construction.

China National Highway 312 passes through Turpan.

The Tulufan Jiaohe Airport is close to Turpan North Railway Station.

== Attractions ==
Turpan is home to one (known as the Tuyuq Khojam Mazar) of several caves associated with the pious Christian and Muslim legend of the Seven Sleepers.

== Notable persons ==
- Mahmut Muhiti
- Emin Khoja

== See also ==
- Dingling (with a special section about the Fufuluo)
- German Turfan expeditions
- Grape Valley
- Jiaohe ruins
- Silk Road transmission of Buddhism
- Tarim mummies
- Turpan Karez Paradise
- Turpan Museum
- Turpan Khanate
- Death Valley
