= Turpan Depression =

Fault-bounded trough in the Tian Shan mountain range

Coordinates: 42.78°N 89.34°E

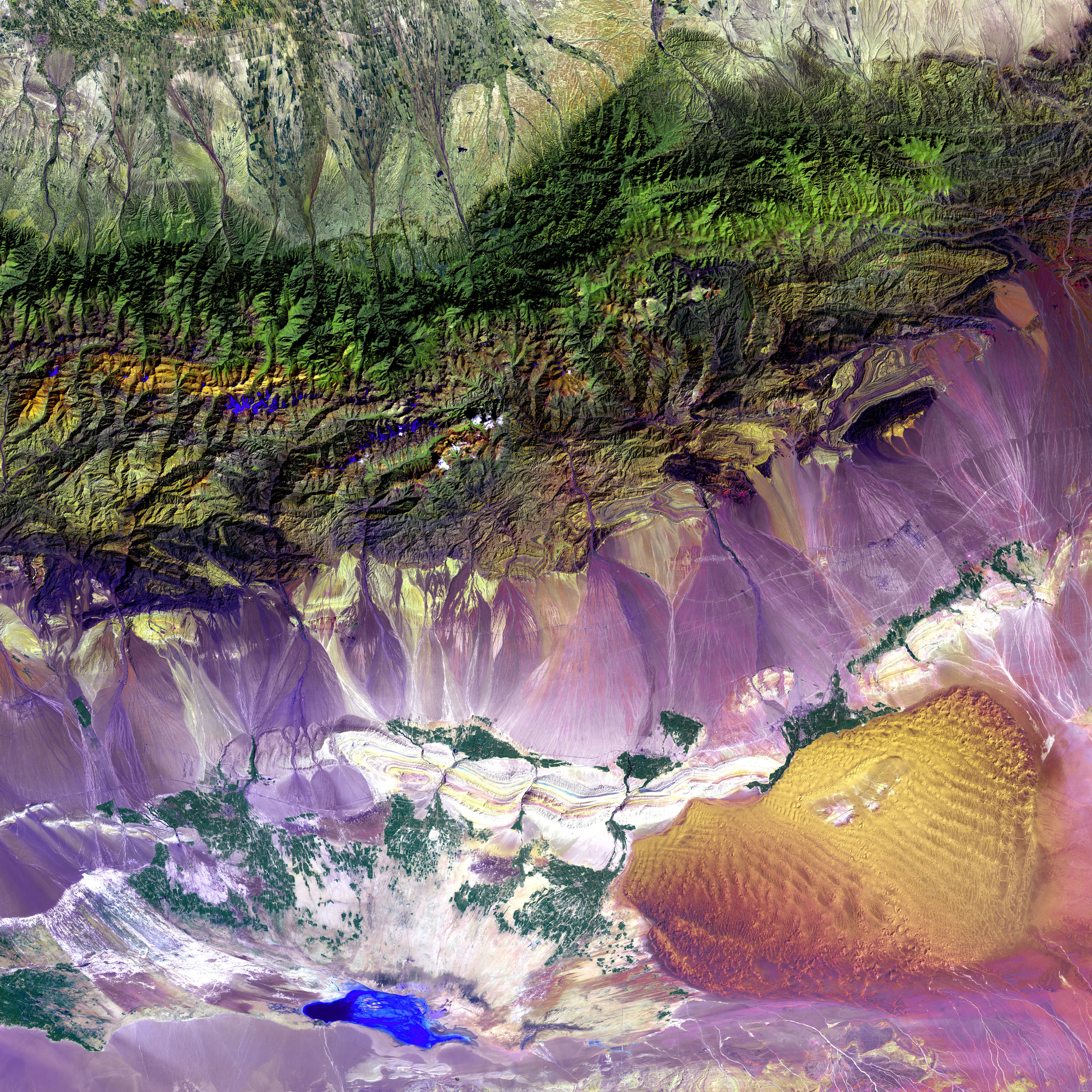
- The Turpan Depression, nestled at the foot of China's Bogda Shan Mountains.

Chinese name
- Traditional Chinese: 吐魯番盆地
- Simplified Chinese: 吐鲁番盆地
Transcriptions
Standard Mandarin
- Hanyu Pinyin: Tǔlǔfán Péndì

Uyghur name
- Uyghur: تۇرپان ئويمانلىقى
Transcriptions
- Latin Yëziqi: Turpan Oymanliqi
- Siril Yëziqi: Турпан Ойманлиқи

The Turpan Depression or Turfan Depression, is a fault-bounded trough located around and south of the city-oasis of Turpan, in the Xinjiang Autonomous Region in far Western China, about 150 kilometres (93 mi) southeast of the regional capital Ürümqi. It includes Lake Ayding, −154 metres (−505 ft), the second or third lowest depression on Earth. By some measures, it is also the hottest and driest area in China during the summer.

== Geology and relief ==
The Turpan Basin is a fault-bounded trough located in the eastern part of the Tian Shan. It covers an area of 50,000 square kilometres (19,000 sq mi). The surrounding mountain ranges are: the central Tian Shan in the west, the Bogda Shan in the north-west, the Haerlike Shan in the north-west, and the Jueluotage Shan in the south. Beyond the surrounding mountain ranges lie the Junggar Basin in the north and the Tarim Basin in the south.

Some geographers also use the term Turpan-Hami Basin, which is understood as including the Turpan Depression along with the Hami Depression (located to the east of the Turpan Depression, and to the southwest of the city of Hami) and the Liaodong Uplift separating the two depressions. A source using this terminology gave the area of the Turpan Depression proper as 28,600 km^{2} (11,000 sq mi), that of the Hami Depression as 19,300 km^{2} (7,500 sq mi), and for the entire Turpan-Hami Basin, as 48,000 km^{2} (19,000 sq mi).

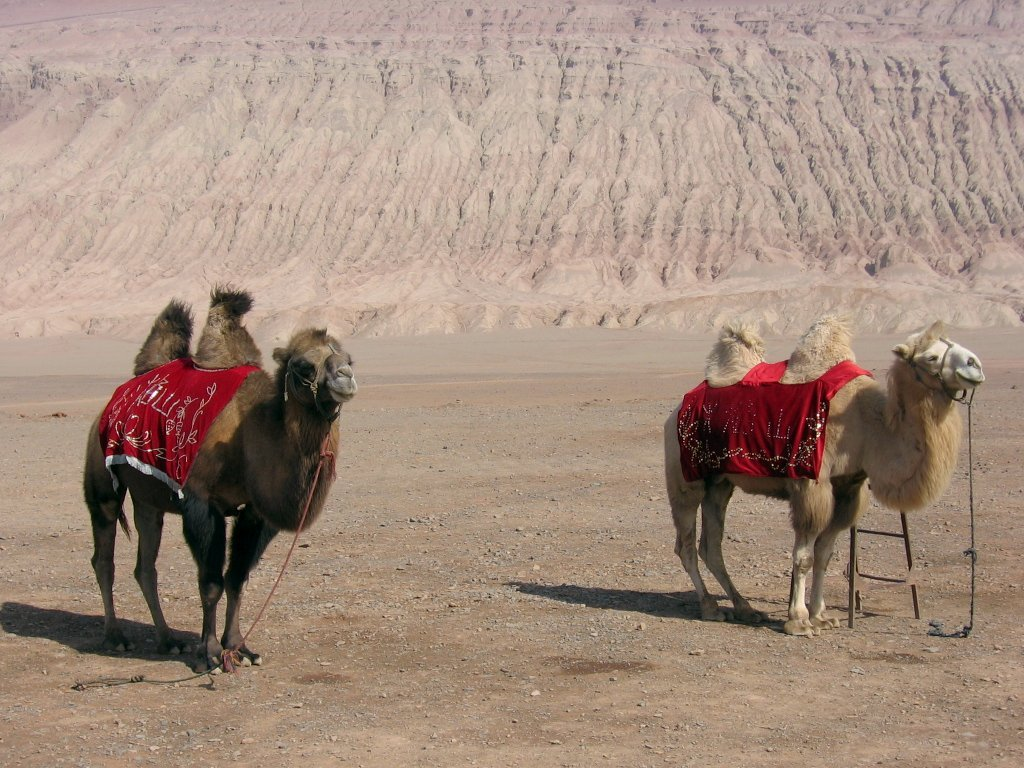
Basin scene near Flaming Mountains

The Turpan Basin formed in a shear zone during the Late Permian due to motion between the East European and the Angaran craton. It was subsequently deformed by the collision of the Indian Plate and Eurasian Plate in the Cenozoic. In the latter deformation, a thrust fault belt running from east to west, the Flaming Mountains, was formed in the center of the basin. The Flaming Mountains are 98 km (61 mi) long and 9 km (5.6 mi) wide; the highest peak reaches an elevation of 831.7 m (2,729 ft) above sea level. The Turfan volcano is located near Turpan.

Also in the center of the basin lies the Ayding Lake (Moonlight Lake) which has an elevation of 154.5 m (507 ft) below sea level, the sixth lowest exposed elevation on the Earth's land surface. It is the lowest surface point in China.

The Shihongtan uranium ore deposit is located at the southwestern margin of the Turpan Depression, some 35 km (22 mi) south-southwest from Turpan City.

== History of human settlement ==
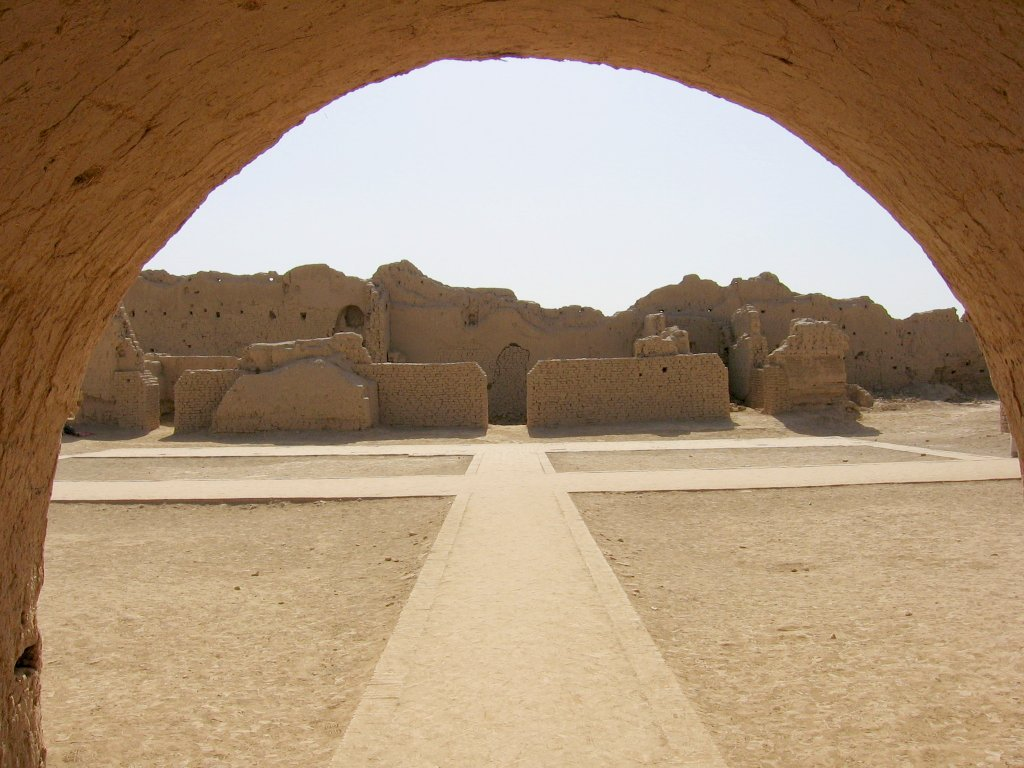
Ruins of Gaochang

The ancient city of Gaochang was a key point on the ancient Silk Road and dates back to the 1st century BC. It was burnt down in wars in the 14th century. The Bezeklik Thousand Buddha Caves, which are located in the Flaming Mountains' Mutou Valley, about 30 km (19 mi) east of the city of Turpan, have been hewn into the rock from the Tang dynasty–era up to the time of the Yuan dynasty (13th century). The caves are famous for their murals, which can still be found in about 40 of the 77 known caves. The desert climate has favored preservation of the content of the Astana-Karakhoja ancient tombs, which are located about 6 km from the ancient city of Gaochang. The tombs are the burial place for nobles, officials, and others who were interred there from the times of the Western Jin dynasty until the middle of the Tang dynasty era.

The modern city of Turpan has a population of 242,000, of whom 71% are Uyghur. For water, the city relies on wells and traditional karez (meaning "well" in the local Uyghur language).

== Climate ==
The Turpan Basin has a harsh, continental desert climate (Koppen BWk) in which the precipitation is far less than the potential evaporation. At Turpan City, July is the hottest month with a 24-hour average temperature of 32.2 °C (90.0 °F) and January the coldest with a 24-hour average temperature of −7.6 °C (18.3 °F). Monthly rainfall is highest in June, at 2.9 millimetres (0.11 in) and lowest in February and April, at 0.5 mm (0.020 in). The annual average precipitation is only 15.7 mm (0.62 in), falling on only 13 days per year. In contrast to this, the potential annual evaporation rate reaches 3,000 mm (120 in). Because of its climate, the area is sometimes counted as one of the Furnaces of China, although the locations included under this heading vary.

Climate data for Turpan, elevation 39 m (128 ft), (1991–2020 normals, extremes 1951–present)
Month	Jan	Feb	Mar	Apr	May	Jun	Jul	Aug	Sep	Oct	Nov	Dec	Year
Record high °C (°F)	8.5 (47.3)	19.5 (67.1)	31.7 (89.1)	40.9 (105.6)	43.6 (110.5)	47.6 (117.7)	49.1 (120.4)	47.8 (118.0)	43.4 (110.1)	34.3 (93.7)	23.0 (73.4)	9.6 (49.3)	49.1 (120.4)
Mean daily maximum °C (°F)	−2.3 (27.9)	7.0 (44.6)	17.9 (64.2)	27.8 (82.0)	33.9 (93.0)	38.8 (101.8)	40.5 (104.9)	39.0 (102.2)	32.6 (90.7)	22.5 (72.5)	10.3 (50.5)	−0.4 (31.3)	22.3 (72.1)
Daily mean °C (°F)	−6.7 (19.9)	1.3 (34.3)	11.6 (52.9)	20.7 (69.3)	26.6 (79.9)	31.6 (88.9)	33.1 (91.6)	31.2 (88.2)	24.6 (76.3)	14.5 (58.1)	4.4 (39.9)	−4.4 (24.1)	15.7 (60.3)
Mean daily minimum °C (°F)	−10.3 (13.5)	−3.5 (25.7)	5.9 (42.6)	14.2 (57.6)	19.8 (67.6)	24.7 (76.5)	26.5 (79.7)	24.6 (76.3)	18.4 (65.1)	9.1 (48.4)	0.3 (32.5)	−7.6 (18.3)	10.2 (50.3)
Record low °C (°F)	−34 (−29)	−24.5 (−12.1)	−20.4 (−4.7)	−3.5 (25.7)	1.8 (35.2)	10.7 (51.3)	15.1 (59.2)	11.6 (52.9)	1.3 (34.3)	−5.7 (21.7)	−17.8 (0.0)	−26.1 (−15.0)	−34 (−29)
Average precipitation mm (inches)	0.9 (0.04)	0.5 (0.02)	0.7 (0.03)	0.9 (0.04)	1.0 (0.04)	2.6 (0.10)	2.0 (0.08)	2.0 (0.08)	1.4 (0.06)	1.2 (0.05)	0.6 (0.02)	0.9 (0.04)	14.7 (0.6)
Average precipitation days (≥ 0.1 mm)	1.0	0.3	0.3	0.7	1.1	2.0	2.3	1.9	0.9	0.8	0.5	1.1	12.9
Average snowy days	2.5	0.9	0	0	0	0	0	0	0	0	0.2	2.6	6.2
Average relative humidity (%)	56	40	25	23	25	27	30	31	35	45	50	56	37
Mean monthly sunshine hours	121.8	172.0	234.2	263.7	308.4	301.6	303.3	299.6	273.5	238.6	163.7	108.2	2,788.6
Percentage possible sunshine	41	57	62	65	67	66	66	71	74	71	57	39	61
Source 1: China Meteorological Administration
Source 2: NOAAextremes

Climate data for Turpan (Dongkan Station), elevation −49 m (−161 ft), (1991–2020 normals)
Month	Jan	Feb	Mar	Apr	May	Jun	Jul	Aug	Sep	Oct	Nov	Dec	Year
Mean daily maximum °C (°F)	−1.9 (28.6)	7.6 (45.7)	18.6 (65.5)	28.5 (83.3)	34.5 (94.1)	39.3 (102.7)	40.8 (105.4)	39.3 (102.7)	33.2 (91.8)	23.2 (73.8)	10.9 (51.6)	0.0 (32.0)	22.8 (73.1)
Daily mean °C (°F)	−8.0 (17.6)	0.5 (32.9)	11.1 (52.0)	20.7 (69.3)	26.8 (80.2)	31.9 (89.4)	33.3 (91.9)	31.4 (88.5)	24.8 (76.6)	14.8 (58.6)	3.8 (38.8)	−5.7 (21.7)	15.5 (59.8)
Mean daily minimum °C (°F)	−12.8 (9.0)	−5.5 (22.1)	4.5 (40.1)	13.8 (56.8)	19.7 (67.5)	24.9 (76.8)	26.6 (79.9)	24.7 (76.5)	18.3 (64.9)	8.6 (47.5)	−1.3 (29.7)	−9.9 (14.2)	9.3 (48.8)
Average precipitation mm (inches)	0.8 (0.03)	0.4 (0.02)	0.6 (0.02)	1.0 (0.04)	1.0 (0.04)	2.5 (0.10)	2.0 (0.08)	1.9 (0.07)	1.3 (0.05)	0.9 (0.04)	0.4 (0.02)	0.6 (0.02)	13.4 (0.53)
Average precipitation days (≥ 0.1 mm)	1.0	0.3	0.3	0.8	1.0	2.1	2.4	2.1	1.0	0.6	0.4	0.8	12.8
Average snowy days	2.2	0.6	0	0	0	0	0	0	0	0	0.1	2.0	4.9
Average relative humidity (%)	56	41	26	24	25	28	32	33	34	41	48	57	37
Mean monthly sunshine hours	161.9	193.2	246.9	267.1	307.9	304.8	306.1	302.3	282.0	254.7	186.0	140.0	2,952.9
Percentage possible sunshine	55	64	66	66	67	67	67	71	77	76	65	50	66
Source: China Meteorological Administration

== Vegetation and agriculture ==
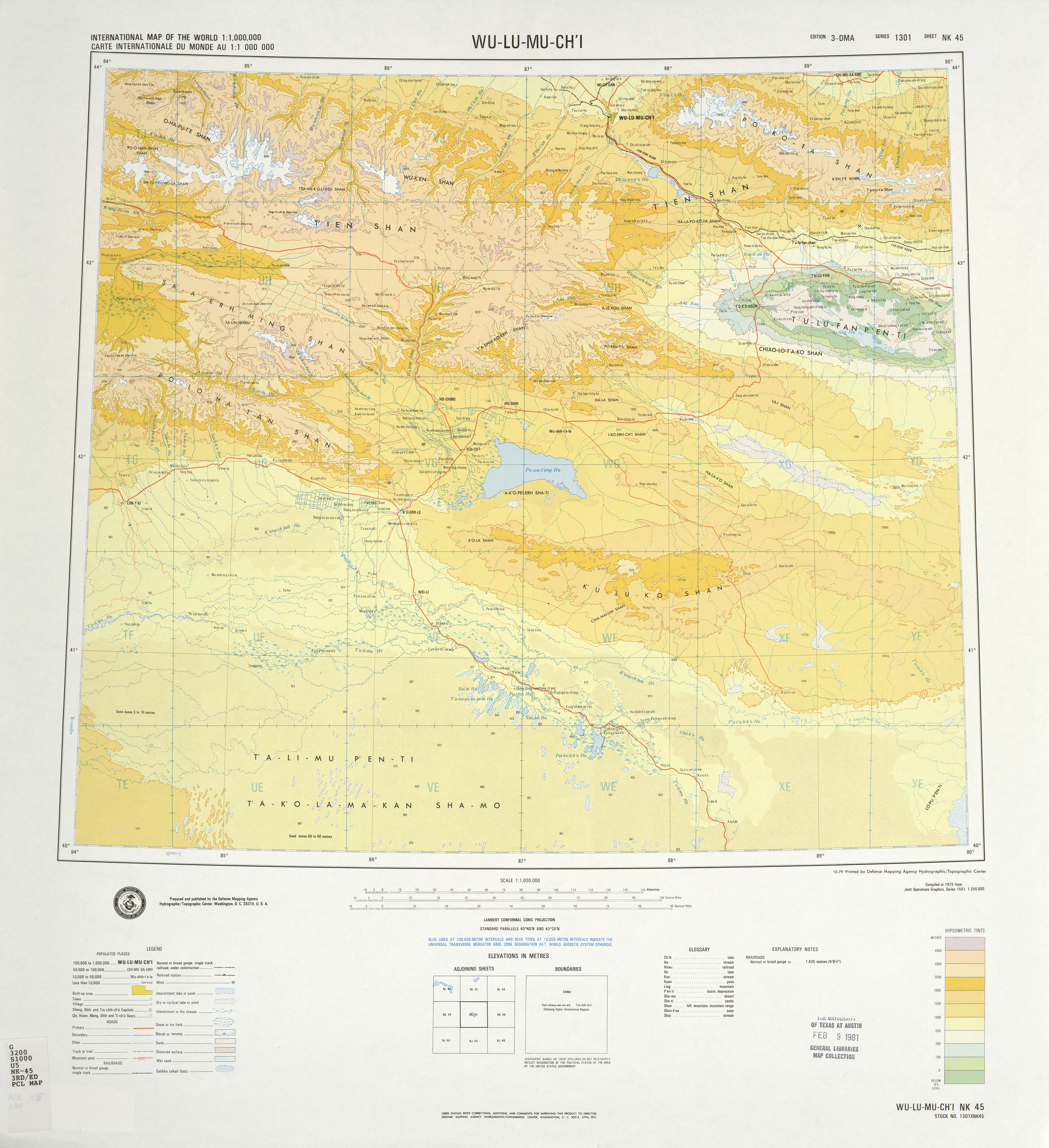
Map including the Turfan Depression (labeled as T'U-LU-FAN P'EN-TI) (1975)

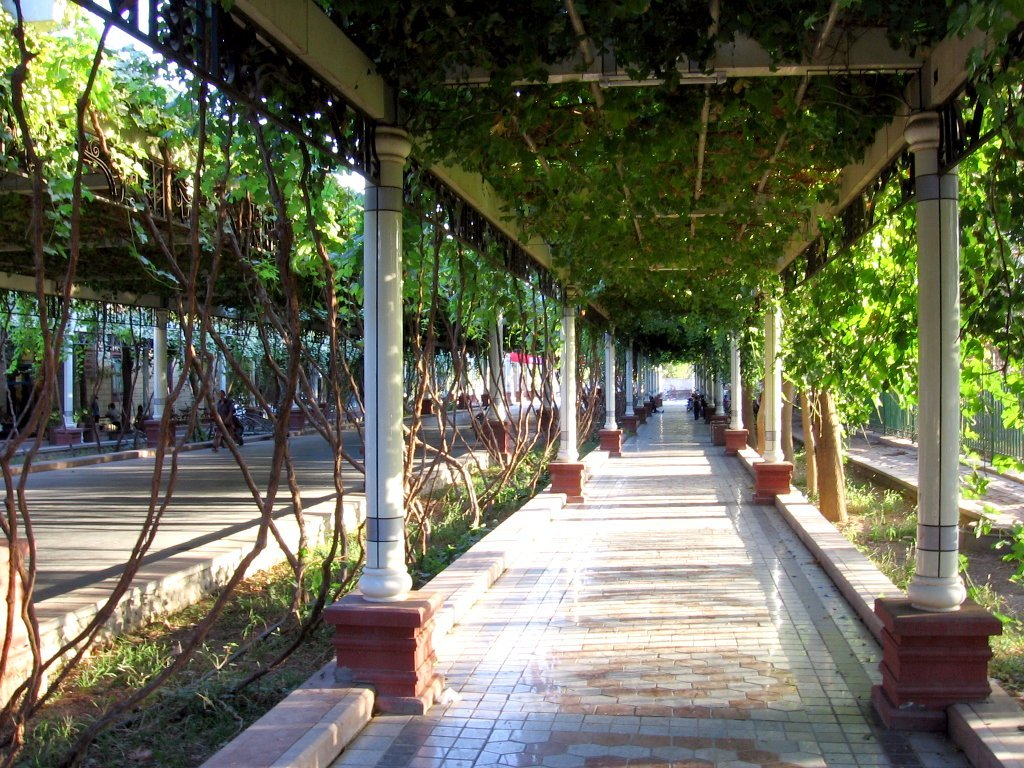
Qingnian Lu, a Turpan city street shaded by grapevine trellises in China's Grape Valley

On the shores of Aydingkol Lake, reeds, tamarisks, saxauls, as well as other shrubs and weeds can be found. Away from sources of water, the Turpan Basin is not covered by vegetation. Consequently, agriculture is limited to oasis and depends on a sophisticated irrigation system known as the Karez System. The irrigation water comes from the surrounding mountain ranges, in particular from the annual melting of the snow. The Karez System consists of wells, underground channels, ground canals, and small reservoirs, which use the natural slope of the terrain to sustain the water flow and guide the water right to the plants while minimizing evaporation all along the way. The historical record of the system extends back to the Han dynasty. The number of Karez systems in the area is slightly below one thousand and the total length of the canals is about 5,000 km (3,100 mi) in length. The Karez System is therefore considered one of the three great ancient projects in China along with the Great Wall and the Grand Canal. Recently, development of groundwater through tubewells has led to a general fall in water tables, and many karez systems have failed. Farming in the Turpan Basin is particularly famous for its fruit. Because of the dry and hot conditions, the fruits grown in the depression have very high concentrations of sugar. They are traditionally processed by drying in open drying barns. The cultivated fruit include: mulberry, peach, apricot, apple, pomegranate, pear, fig, walnut, as well as grapes, watermelons and true melons. Among the fruit, the grapes stand out: more than 100 varieties of grape are cultivated in the area and it accounts for 90% of China's seedless grape crop. Other specialty agricultural products of the region are Donghu Hami melons and long-staple cotton.

== Sources ==
- Lei, Shao; Statteggerb, Karl; Wenhou, Lic; Haupt, Bernd J. (1999). "Depositional style and subsidence history of the Turpan Basin (NW China)". Sedimentary Geology. 128 (1–2): 155–169. Bibcode:1999SedG..128..155S. doi:10.1016/S0037-0738(99)00066-4.
- Allen, M.B.; Sengör, A.M.C.; Natal'in, B.A. (1995). "Junggar, Turpan and Alakol basins as Late Permian to Early Triassic extensional structures in a sinistral shear zone in the Altaid orogenic collage, Central Asia". Journal of the Geological Society. 152 (2): 327–338. Bibcode:1995JGSoc.152..327A. doi:10.1144/gsjgs.152.2.0327. S2CID 128482060.
