= Wuwei =

Wuwei may refer to:

== Philosophy ==
- Wu wei (無為／无为), Chinese philosophical concept from Confucianism and an important concept in Chinese statecraft and Taoism

== Places ==
- Wuwei, Gansu (武威市), prefecture-level city, China
- Wuwei, Anhui (无为市), Wuhu, Anhui, China
- Wuwei, Dingyuan (吴圩镇), town in Dingyuan County, Anhui

== People ==
- Wuwei Chanyu (烏維), chanyu of the Xiongnu empire
- Princess Wuwei (武威公主), also known as Princess Tuoba, daughter of Emperor Mingyuan of Northern Wei in ancient China
- Princess Wuwei (武威公主), daughter of Juqu Mujian and Princess Tuoba in ancient China

== See also ==
- Wu Wei (disambiguation)
