= Gao Xu (Northern Wei) =

Chinese writer and military leader

Gao Xu (Chinese: 高緒; pinyin: Gāo xù, 514–545 CE) was a Chinese writer and military leader of Northern and Eastern Wei with the courtesy name "Shuzong" (Chinese: 叔宗; pinyin: Shū zōng).

He was a son of Gao Qianzhi and a grandson of Gao Chong, himself a grandson of King Juqu Mujian of Northern Liang. Gao Xu was eager to learn, and growing up dabbled in book biography. Gao Xu joined the army of Wei as Sikong (Chinese: 司空; pinyin: Sīkōng) and was then appointed Changliu canjun (Chinese: 長流參軍; pinyin: Chángliú cānjūn). He further served as General Zhenyuan (Chinese: 鎮遠將軍; pinyin: Zhènyuǎn jiāngjūn).

He died in the third year of the Wuding Era (545), aged thirty-two.
