= Gao Xiaozhen =

Chinese official

Gao Xiaozhen (Chinese: 高孝貞; pinyin: Gāoxiàozhēn, fl. 543–550) was a Chinese official from Eastern Wei.

He was a son of Gao Qianzhi and a grandson of Gao Chong. Gao Chong was also a grandson of the king of Northern Liang Juqu Mujian. His father Gao Qianzhi composed a history of Northern Liang and the Juqu clan, compiling ten volumes of the Liang Shu (Chinese: 涼書; pinyin: Liáng shū).

He joined the military of Wei during the years of the Wuding era (543–550), holding the posts of Situ Shicaocanjun (Chinese: 司徒士曹參軍; pinyin: Sītú shì cáo cānjūn).
