= Sima Huilang =

Chinese official

Sima Huilang (Chinese: 司馬徽亮; pinyin: Sīmǎ huī liàng, fl. 496 CE) was a Chinese official and military leader from Northern Wei.

== Biography ==
He was the son of Sima Jinlong (Chinese: 司馬金龍; pinyin: Sīmǎ jīnlóng), courtesy name Rongze (榮則), a prince and general of Northern Wei. His father spent all his life among the Northern Wei, was given in marriage the niece of Emperor Taiwu of Northern Wei (brother of her mother, Princess Wuwei) and also daughter of the Northern Liang ruler Juqu Mujian, giving birth to Sima Huilang. He was favored by Empress Wenming and was able to inherit all the titles of his father.

He participated in Mutai's (Chinese: 穆泰; pinyin: Mù tài) rebellion, losing his title.
