= Gao Qianzhi =

Chinese bureaucrat, literati and scholar

Gao Qianzhi (Chinese: 高謙之; pinyin: Gāo qiānzhī, 486–527 CE) was a bureaucrat, literati, and scholar of the Northern Wei Dynasty with the courtesy name of Daorang (Chinese: 道讓; pinyin: Dào ràng). He was from Bohai Commandery.

== History ==
He was born to Northern Wei nobleman and official Gao Chong. He was raised by his stepmother Li, who made no distinctions between her children and him, and Qianzhi showed filial piety towards her. When he grew up, he read widely, not only classics and histories, but also astronomy and maps. He inherited his father's title, and was given the title of General Xuanwei (Chinese: 宣威將軍; pinyin: Xuān wēi jiāngjūn). He was promoted to Che Duwei (Chinese: 奉車都尉; pinyin: Fèng chē dū wèi) and Tingwei Cheng (Chinese: 廷尉丞; pinyin: Tíng wèi chéng).

In 525 (first year of Xiaochang), he acted as the county magistrate of Heyin. He soon received the title of General Ningyuan (Chinese: 寧遠將軍; pinyin: Níngyuǎn jiāngjūn). Gao Qianzhi spent two years in Heyin, making profits and losses on the political system, and he often studied the old rules. At that time, his younger brother Gao Daomu (that is, Gao Gongzhi, courtesy name Daomu) was the censor. He also had a reputation for being talented. He made a plea for fair reward and punishment, which caught the attention of Empress Dowager Hu, who appointed him Guozi official (Chinese: 國子博士; pinyin: Guó zǐ bóshì). He inquired about the history of the Northern Liang Juqu clan and compiled the Liang Shu (Chinese: 涼書; pinyin: Liáng shū) in ten volumes.

In 527 (in the third year of Xiaochang), when the Imperial Court planned to mint coins, he ordered the minting of three coins. Although this plan was accepted, it was not implemented during his lifetime.

Always in the third year of Xiaochang (527), he was framed by Li Shengui and died in prison on the eve of the amnesty at the age of forty-two. During the Yong'an period, he was given the posthumous titles of Provincial Governor of Yingzhou (Chinese: 營州刺史; pinyin: Yíng zhōu cìshǐ) and Conscript General (Chinese: 徵虜將軍; pinyin: Zhǐ lǔ jiāngjūn), and was given the posthumous name of "Kang" (Chinese: 康; pinyin: Kāng).

Over 100 articles written by him during his lifetime were collected and compiled into an anthology.

== Personal information ==
Consort and issue(s):

- Mrs Zhang (張氏) from Zhongshan
  - Gao Ziru (高子儒), courtesy name Xiaoli (孝禮), held several posts, including Guanglu Dafu (Chinese: 光祿大夫; pinyin: Guāng lù dàfū)
  - Gao Xu (高緒), courtesy name Shuzong (叔宗), held several posts, including General Zhenyuan (Chinese: 鎮遠將軍 編輯; pinyin: Zhènyuǎn jiāngjūn biānjí)
  - Gao Xiaozhen (高孝貞)
  - Gao Xiaoqian (高孝幹)
