= Jin dynasty (266–420) =

Imperial dynasty in China

Jin 晉
- 266–420 CE
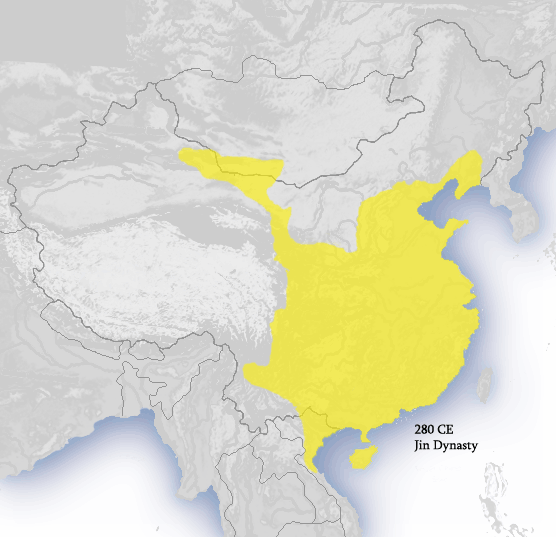
- The Western Jin at its greatest extent, c. 280
- Capital: Luoyang (266–311); Chang'an (312–316); Jiankang (317–420)
- Common languages: Eastern Han Chinese
- Religion: Buddhism, Taoism, Chinese folk religion
- Government: Monarchy
- Emperor
  - 266–290: Emperor Wu
  - 318–323: Emperor Yuan
  - 419–420 (last): Emperor Gong
- Chancellor
- History
  - Establishment: 266
  - Reunification of China proper: 280
  - Eastern Jin begins; evacuation south of the Huai River: 317
  - Abdication to Liu Song: 420 CE

Area
- 280 (Western Jin peak): 3,100,000 km^{2} (1,200,000 sq mi)
- 347 (Eastern Jin peak): 2,800,000 km^{2} (1,100,000 sq mi)
- Currency: Chinese coin, Cash
Preceded by	Succeeded by
Cao Wei; Eastern Wu	Sixteen Kingdoms; Liu Song
- Today part of: China; Mongolia; North Korea; Vietnam

Jin dynasty
- Traditional Chinese: 晉朝
- Simplified Chinese: 晋朝
Transcriptions
Standard Mandarin
- Hanyu Pinyin: Jìncháo
- Wade–Giles: Chin^{4} ch‘ao^{2}
- IPA: [tɕîn ʈʂʰǎʊ]
Yue: Cantonese
- Yale Romanization: Jeun chìuh
- Jyutping: Zeon3 ciu4
- IPA: [tsɵn˧ tsʰiw˩]
Old Chinese
- Baxter–Sagart (2014): tsinH

Alternative Chinese name
- Traditional Chinese: 司馬晉
- Simplified Chinese: 司马晋
Transcriptions
Standard Mandarin
- Hanyu Pinyin: Sīmǎ Jìn
- Wade–Giles: Ssu^{1}-ma^{4} Chin^{4}

Second alternative Chinese name
- Traditional Chinese: 兩晉
- Simplified Chinese: 两晋
- Literal meaning: Two Jins
Transcriptions
Standard Mandarin
- Hanyu Pinyin: Liǎng Jìn
- Wade–Giles: Liang^{3} Chin^{4}

The Jin dynasty or the Jin Empire, officially Jin, sometimes distinguished as the Sima Jin or the Two Jins, was an imperial dynasty in China that existed from 266 to 420 CE. It was founded by Sima Yan, posthumously known as Emperor Wu of Jin, who previously served as the regent of the Cao Wei dynasty.

There are two main divisions in the history of the dynasty. The Western Jin (266–316 CE) was established as the successor to Cao Wei after Emperor Wu usurped the throne from Cao Huan. The capital of the Western Jin was initially in Luoyang, though it later moved to Chang'an (modern Xi'an). In 280 CE, after conquering Eastern Wu, the Western Jin ended the Three Kingdoms period and reunited China proper for the first time since the end of the Han dynasty.

From 291 to 306 CE, a series of civil wars known as the War of the Eight Princes were fought over control of the Jin state which weakened it considerably. In 304 CE, the dynasty experienced a wave of rebellions by non-Han ethnicities termed by exonym as "Five Barbarians". The "barbarians" went on to establish nonpermanent dynastic states in northern China. This helped to usher in the Sixteen Kingdoms era of Chinese history, in which states in the north rose and fell in rapid succession, constantly fighting both one another and the Jin. Han-Zhao, one of the northern states established during the disorder, sacked Luoyang in 311, captured Chang'an in 316, and executed Emperor Min of Jin in 318 CE, ending the Western Jin era. Sima Rui, who succeeded Emperor Min, then reestablished the Jin dynasty with its capital in Jiankang (modern Nanjing), inaugurating the Eastern Jin (317–420 CE).

The Eastern Jin dynasty remained in near-constant conflict with its northern neighbors for most of its existence, and it launched several invasions of the north with the aim of recovering its lost territories. In 383 CE, the Eastern Jin inflicted a devastating defeat on the Former Qin, a Di-ruled state that had briefly unified northern China. In the aftermath of that battle, the Former Qin state splintered, and Jin armies recaptured the lands south of the Yellow River. The Eastern Jin was eventually usurped by General Liu Yu in 420 CE and replaced with the Liu Song dynasty. The Eastern Jin dynasty is considered the second of the Six Dynasties.

== History ==
=== Background ===
During the Three Kingdoms period, the Sima clan—with its most accomplished individual being Sima Yi—rose to prominence within the kingdom of Cao Wei that dominated northern China. Sima Yi was the regent of Cao Wei, and in 249 he instigated a coup d'état known as the Incident at the Gaoping Tombs, after which the Sima clan began to surpass the imperial Cao clan's power in the kingdom. After Sima Yi's death in 251, Sima Yi's eldest son Sima Shi succeeded his father as regent of Cao Wei, maintaining the Sima clan's tight grip on the Cao Wei political scene. After Sima Shi's death in 255, Sima Shi's younger brother Sima Zhao became the regent of Cao Wei. Sima Zhao further assisted his clans' interests by suppressing rebellions and dissent.

In 263, he directed Cao Wei forces in conquering Shu Han and capturing Liu Shan (the son of Liu Bei), marking the first demise of one of the Three Kingdoms. Sima Zhao's actions awarded him the title of King of Jin, the last achievable rank beneath that of emperor. He was granted the title because his ancestral home was located in Wen County, on the territory of the Zhou-era state of Jin, which was centered on the Jin River in Shaanxi. Sima Zhao's ambitions for the throne were visible, but he died in 265 before any usurpation attempt could be made, passing the opportunity to his ambitious son Sima Yan.

=== Western Jin (266–316) ===
==== Founding and unification ====
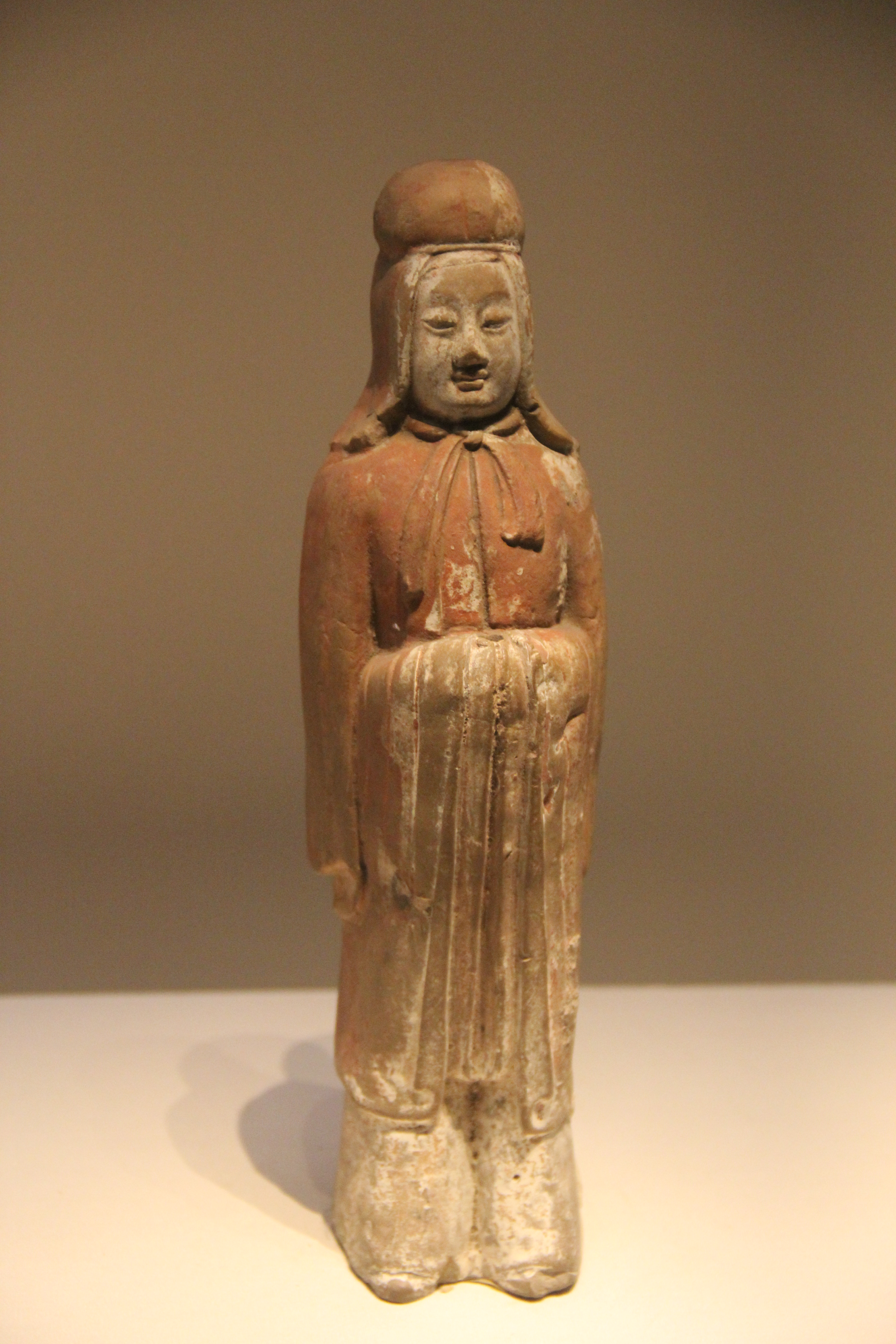
Western Jin-era porcelain figurine

The Jin dynasty was founded by Sima Yan, who became known as Emperor Wu (the "Martial Emperor of Jin"). After succeeding his father as the King of Jin and regent of Cao Wei in 265, Sima Yan declared himself emperor of the Jin dynasty on 4 February 266 and forced the final Wei ruler Cao Huan to abdicate. Emperor Wu permitted Cao Huan to live the rest of his life with honour as the Prince of Chenliu, and he was later buried with imperial ceremony. In 280, Emperor Wu conquered the Eastern Wu and united China proper, thus ending the Three Kingdoms period.

Following the unification, China entered a decade of peace and economic prosperity, with accounts detailing the extravagant and outlandish lifestyles of the aristocracy. Internally, Emperor Wu upheld Confucian primogeniture by decreeing that his eldest son, Sima Zhong, posthumously known as Emperor Hui, would succeed him to the throne, despite his apparent developmental disability. To protect his heir and dynasty, he empowered his princes and dukes by appointing them to important military and administrative positions. Meanwhile, a few officials also began expressing concerns regarding the growing population and treatment of the various non-Han peoples ("Five Barbarians") that had been resettling in northern China for centuries.

==== Decline ====
Emperor Wu died in 290, and Emperor Hui's ascension began the War of the Eight Princes. In 291, Emperor Hui's wife, Empress Jia, seized power and began ruling the empire behind her husband's throne. Under her rule, the affluence of the aristocracy went unchecked, and corruption ran rampant within the government. She and her family were overthrown in a coup in 300, but a series of civil wars soon broke out between the Sima princes for the regency and succession of Emperor Hui, devastating most of northern China and the imperial military.

The short-lived unification of China came to an end in 304; that year, the Cheng-Han and Han-Zhao declared their independence from Jin. The Upheaval of the Five Barbarians carried on the chaos from the War of the Eight Princes, as uprisings and famines continued to erode Jin authority in the north. In 311, the Jin capital Luoyang was sacked by Han-Zhao forces under Liu Cong, and Sima Chi, posthumously known as Emperor Huai, was captured and later executed. Emperor Huai's successor Sima Ye, posthumously known as Emperor Min, was then also captured and executed by Han-Zhao when they seized Chang'an (present-day Xi'an) in 316, marking the end of the Western Jin. The surviving members of the Jin imperial family, as well as large numbers of Han Chinese from the North China Plain, subsequently fled to southern China. These refugees had a large impact on the lands they moved to—for example, they gave Quanzhou's Jin River its name upon their settlement there.

=== Eastern Jin (317–420) ===
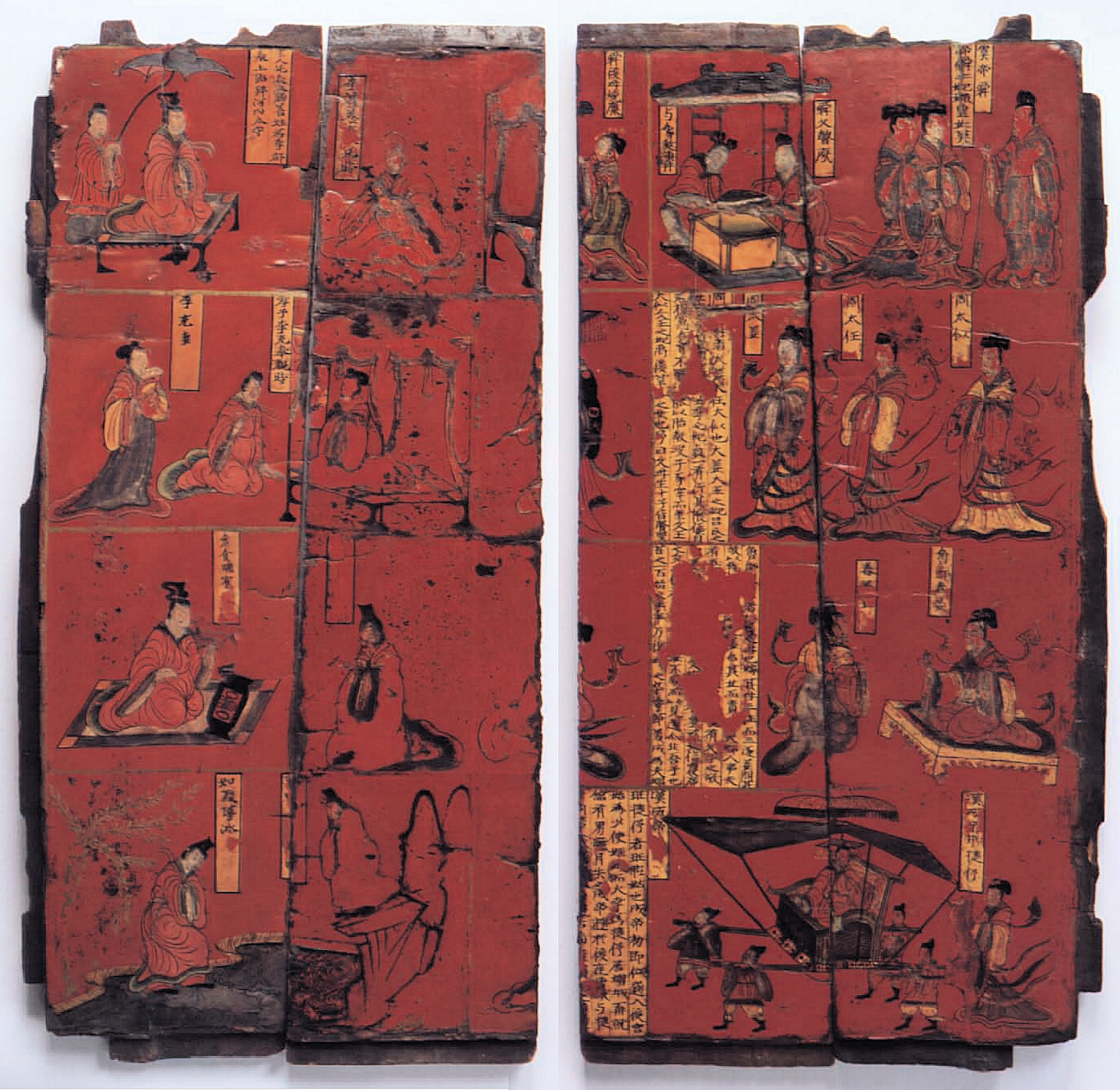
Lacquer screen, from the tomb of Sima Jinlong, 484 CE. Untypical of the Northern Wei style, it was probably brought from the court of the Jin dynasty by Sima Jinlong's father. Alternatively, it could be a Northern Wei work strongly influenced by Jin artistic styles, such as the work of Gu Kaizhi.

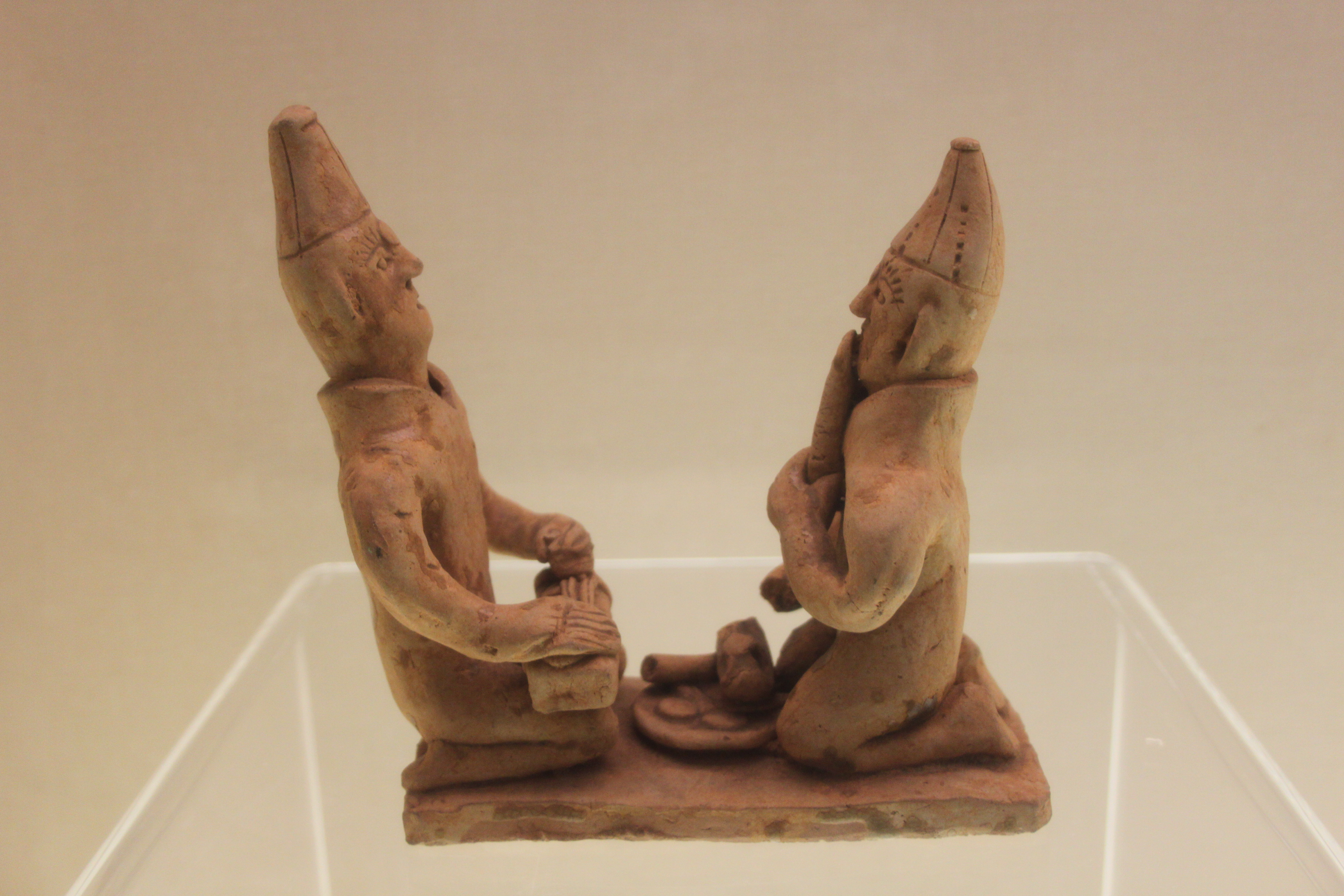
Western Jin celadon figures

==== Establishment ====
After the fall of Chang'an and the execution of Emperor Min of Jin, Sima Rui, posthumously known as Emperor Yuan, was enthroned as Jin emperor in 318. He reestablished the Jin government at Jiankang (modern Nanjing), which became the dynasty's new capital and marked the beginning of the Eastern Jin period. Since one of Sima Rui's titles was the prince of Langya, the newly established northern states, which denied the legitimacy of his succession, sometimes referred to his empire as "Langya".

The Eastern Jin period saw the peak of menfa (門閥 'gentry clan') politics. The authority of the emperors was limited, while national affairs were controlled by powerful immigrant elite clans like the Wang (王) clans of Langya and Taiyuan, the Xie (謝) clan of Chenliu, the Huan (桓) clan of Qiao Commandery, and the Yu (庾) clan of Yingchuan. Among the people, a common remark was that "Wang Dao and Sima Rui, they dominate the nation together" (王與馬，共天下). It was said that when Emperor Yuan was holding court, he even invited Wang Dao to sit by his side so they could jointly accept congratulations from ministers, but Wang Dao declined the offer.

==== Wars with the north ====
In order to recover the lands lost during the fall of the Western Jin, the Eastern Jin dynasty launched several military campaigns against the northern states, such as the expeditions led by Huan Wen from 354 to 369. Most notably, in 383, a heavily outnumbered Eastern Jin force inflicted a devastating defeat on the state of Former Qin at the Battle of Fei River. After this battle, the Former Qin—which had recently unified northern China—began to collapse, and the Jin dynasty recovered the lands south of the Yellow River. Some of these lands were later lost, but the Jin regained them once more when Liu Yu defeated the northern states in his northern expeditions of 409–416.

Despite successes against the northern states like the Battle of Fei River, paranoia in the royal family and a constant disruptions to the throne often caused loss of support for northern campaigns. For example, lack of support by the Jin court was a major cause of Huan Wen's failure to recover the north in his expeditions. Additionally, internal military crises—including the rebellions of generals Wang Dun and Su Jun, but also lesser fangzhen (方鎮 'military command') revolts—plagued the Eastern Jin throughout its 104-year existence.

==== Mass migration to the south ====
The local aristocrat clans of the south were often at odds with the immigrants from the north. As such, tensions increased, and rivalry between the immigrants and southern locals loomed large in the domestic politics of the Jin. Two of the most prominent local clans, the Zhou (周) clan of Yixing and the Shen (沈) clan of Wuxing, were dealt a bitter blow from which they never quite recovered. There was also conflict between the various northern immigrant clans. This led to a virtual balance of power, which somewhat benefited the emperor's rule.

Special "commanderies of immigrants" and "white registers" were created for the massive amounts of northern Han Chinese who moved south during the Eastern Jin. The southern Chinese aristocracy was formed from the offspring of these migrants. Particularly in the Jiangnan region, Celestial Masters and the nobility of northern China subdued the nobility of southern China during the Jin dynasty. Southern China overtook the north in population due to depopulation of the north and the migration of northern Chinese to southern China. Different waves of migration of aristocratic Chinese from northern China to the south at different times resulted in distinct groups of aristocratic lineages.

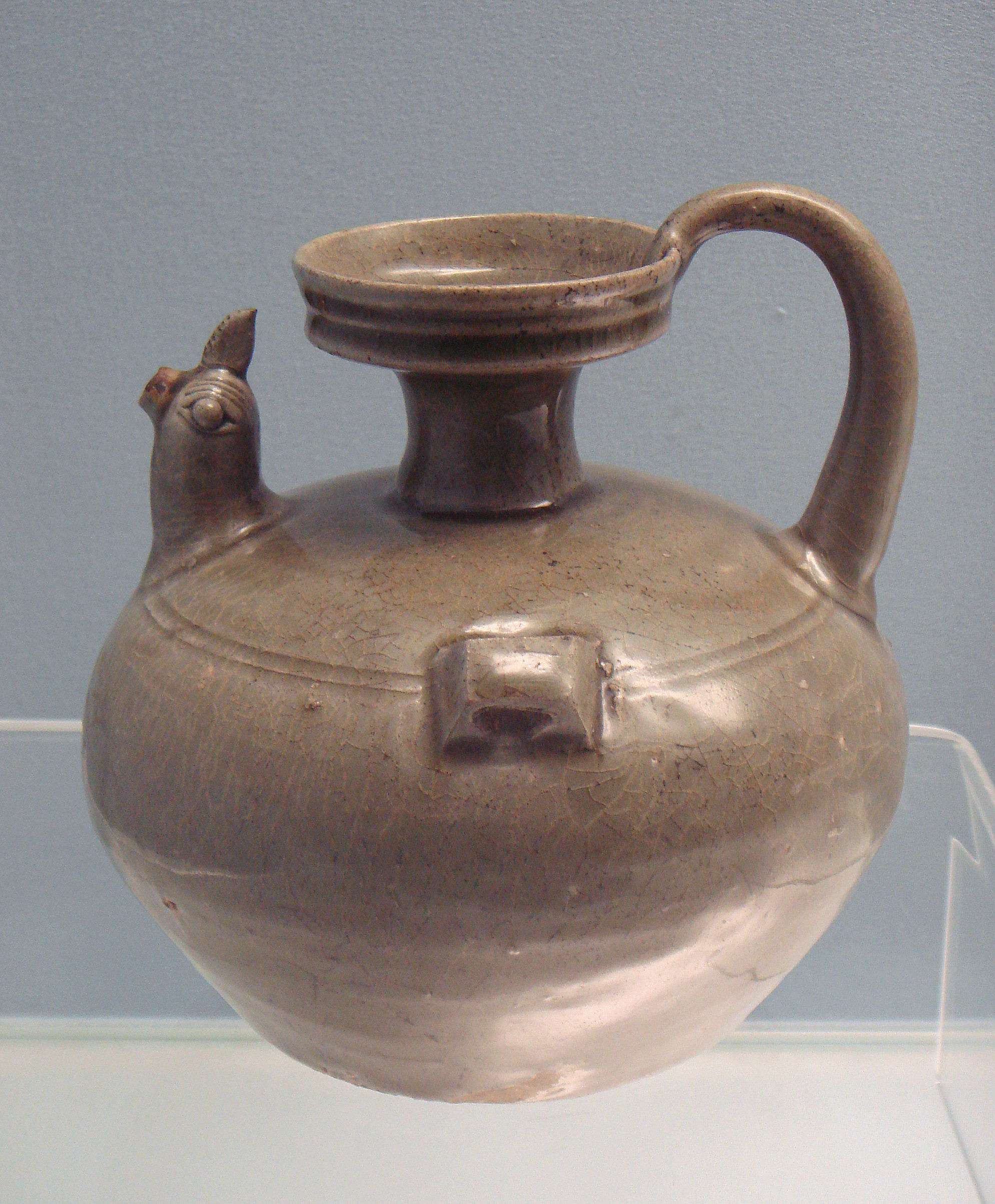
Eastern Jin celadon jar

=== Demise ===
In 403, Huan Xuan, the son of esteemed general Huan Wen, usurped the Jin throne and declared the dynasty of Huan Chu. Huan Xuan was soon toppled by Liu Yu, who reinstated Jin rule by installing Sima Dezong on the throne, posthumously known as Emperor An. Meanwhile, the civilian administration suffered, as there were further revolts led by Sun En and Lu Xun, and Western Shu became an independent kingdom under Qiao Zong. In 419, Liu Yu had Sima Dezong strangled and replaced by his brother Sima Dewen, posthumously known as Emperor Gong. Finally, in 420, Sima Dewen abdicated in favour of Liu Yu, who declared himself the ruler of the new Song dynasty (which is referred to as the Liu Song dynasty by historians in order to prevent confusion with the Song dynasty established in 960). Sima Dewen was then asphyxiated with a blanket in the following year. In the north, Northern Liang, the last of the Sixteen Kingdoms, was conquered by Northern Wei in 439, ushering in the Northern dynasties period.

The Xianbei Northern Wei accepted the Jin refugees Sima Fei (司馬朏) and Sima Chuzhi (司馬楚之). They both married Xianbei princesses. Sima Fei's wife was named Huayang (華陽公主), who was a daughter of Emperor Xiaowen; Sima Chuzhi's son was Sima Jinlong, who married a Northern Liang princess who was a daughter of the Lushuihu king Juqu Mujian. More than fifty percent of Tuoba Xianbei princesses of the Northern Wei were married to southern Han Chinese men from the imperial families and aristocrats from southern China of the Southern dynasties who defected and moved north to join the Northern Wei. Much later, Sima Guang (1019–1086), who served as chancellor for the Song and created the comprehensive history Zizhi Tongjian, claimed descent from the Jin dynasty (specifically, Sima Fu, brother of Sima Yi).

== Government and demography ==
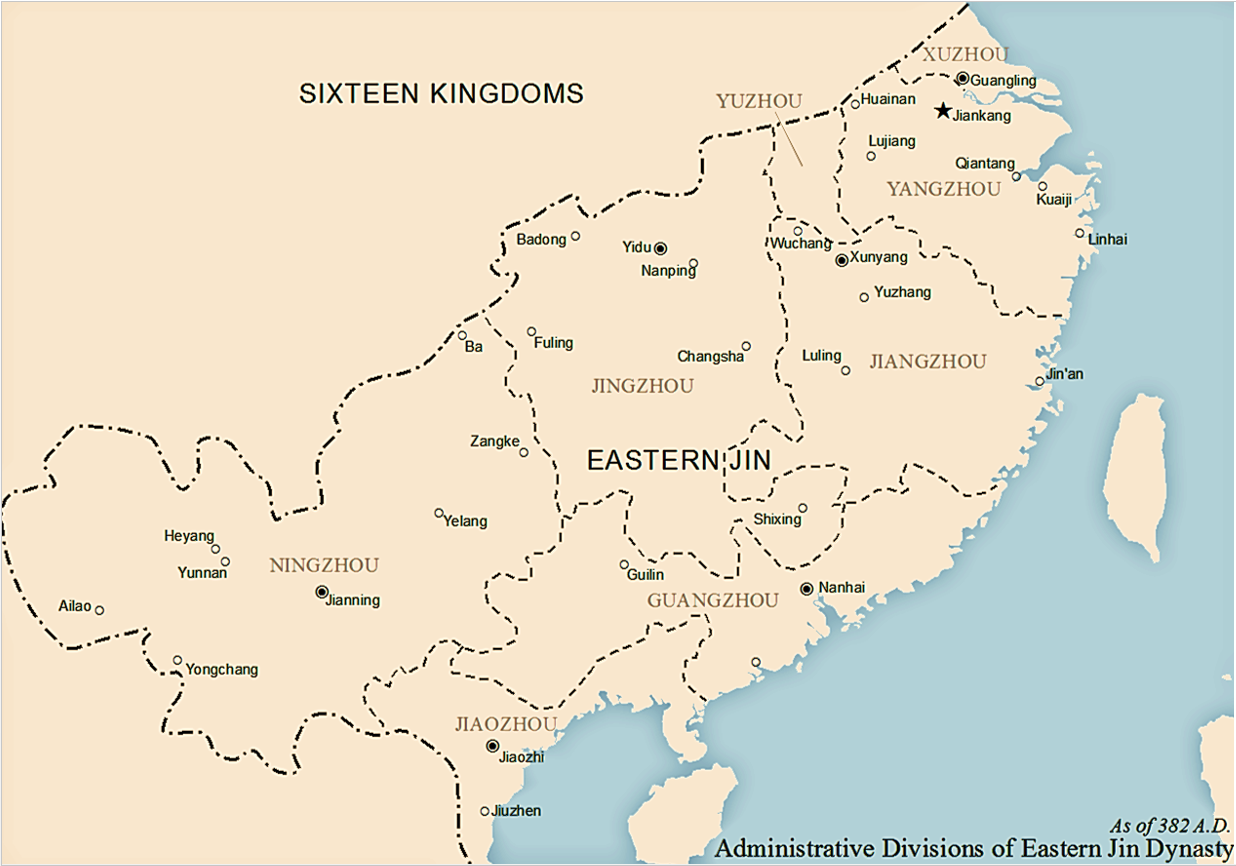
Administrative divisions of Eastern Jin dynasty as of 382

=== Qiaoren and baiji ===
The uprising of the five barbarians led to one in eight northerners migrating to the south. These immigrants were called qiaoren (僑人 'lodged people'), accounting for one-sixth of the population of the south at the time. With consideration of the material loss refugees had experienced before arrival, they were exempt from the diao (調) tax, and other services. Those whose registers were bound in white paper were called baiji (白籍), while the others with registers bound in yellow paper were called huangji (黃籍). When the crisis had subsided, this preferential increasingly seemed a heavy burden on the people, arousing dissatisfaction in the natives. Hence, tu duan was an increasingly important issue for the Eastern Jin.

=== Lodged administrative divisions ===
The Eastern Jin court established three levels of administrative divisions which served as strongholds for the qiaoren: the qiaozhou (僑州, 'province'), qiaojun (僑郡, 'commandery'), and qiaoxian (僑縣, the lodged county), these lodged administrative divisions were merely nominal without possessing actual domain, or rather, they were local government in exile; what could scarcely be denied was their significance in Jin's legitimacy for the northern territory as somewhat an announcement. Furthermore, it was also an action done to appease the refugees' homesickness, which was evoking their desire to reacquire what had been lost.

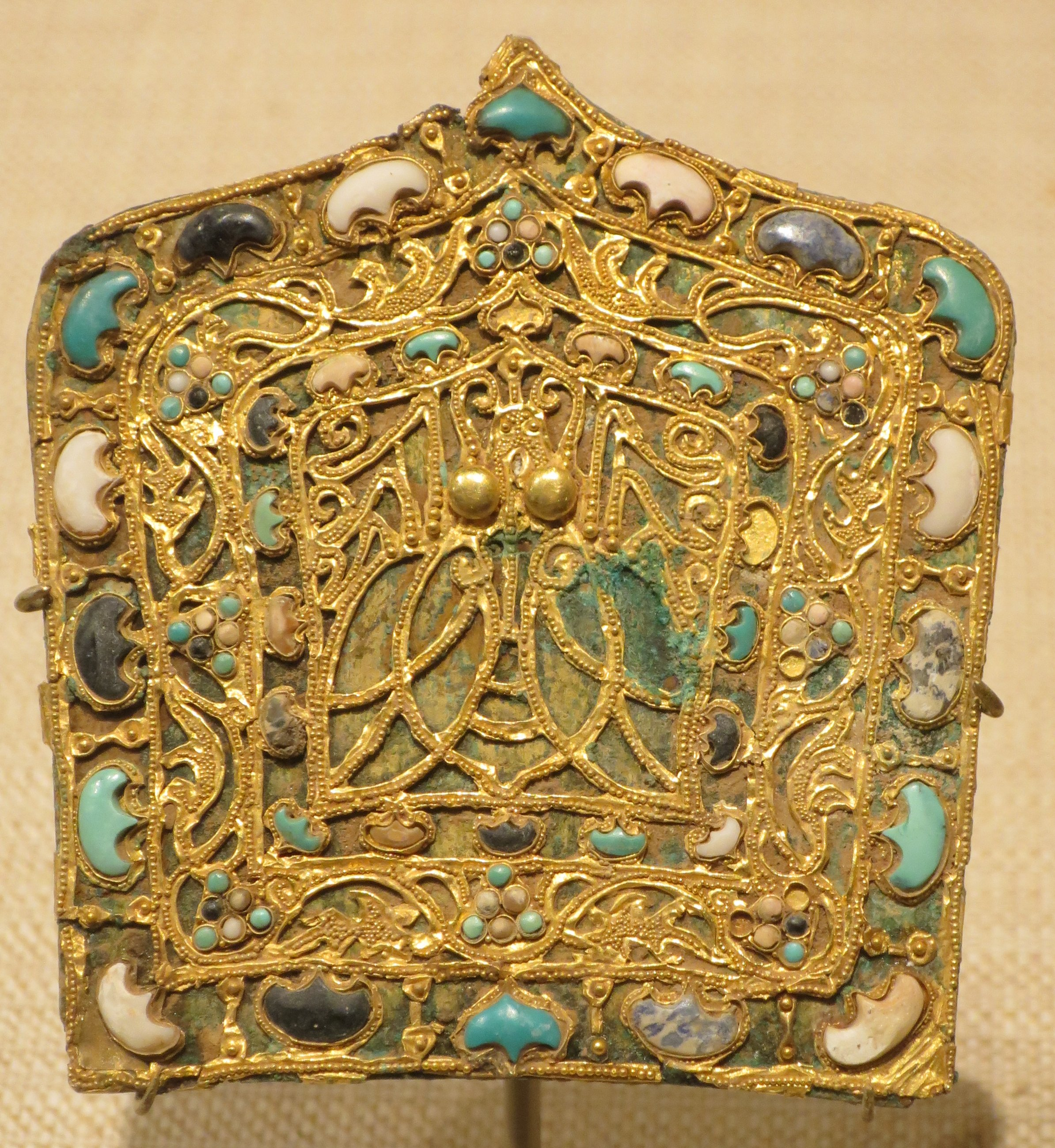
Ornamental plaque, Eastern Jin dynasty, Metropolitan Museum of Art.

During the rule of Emperor Yuan, Emperor Ming, and Emperor Cheng, the lodged administrative divisions were concentrated in the area south of the Huai River and the Lower Yangtze Plain. At first there was the lodged Langya Commandery within lodged Fei County in Jiankang, but when it began is not exactly known. Then the lodged Huaide County was also established in Jiankang, around 320. According to the Book of Song:

晉永嘉大亂，幽、冀、青、并、兗州及徐州之淮北流民，相率過淮，亦有過江在晉陵郡界者……又徙流民之在淮南者于晉陵諸縣，其徙過江南及留在江北者，並立僑郡縣以司牧之。徐、兗二州或治江北，江北又僑立幽、冀、青、并四州……(After Disaster of Yongjia, the refugees from You, Ji, Qing, Bing, Yan and Xu provinces came across the Huai River, some even came across the Yangtze River and stayed in Jinling Commandery... The lodged administrative divisions were established to govern them. The seats of Xu and Yan provinces perhaps were moved to the area north of the Yangtze River, where the lodged You, Ji, Qing, Bing provinces were established.)

The lodged Pei, Qinghe, Xiapi, Dongguang, Pingchang, Jiyin, Puyang, Guangping, Taishan, Jiyang, and Lu commanderies were established when Emperor Ming ruled. The rebellions and invasions occurring in Jianghuai area led to more refugees switching to settle in the south of the Yangtze River, where the lodged Huainan Commandery was established afterwards.

However, carrying these out was more complex than the policy was formulated. Several actual counties were under the jurisdiction of the lodged commanderies.

A few lodged administrative divisions are still retained in China nowadays. For instance, Dangtu County was originally located in the area of Bengbu, however, the lodged Dangtu County was established in where it is now, and the latter replaced the former, inheriting its place name.

=== Tu Duan policy ===
The Eastern Jin dynasty and contemporary Asian polities c. 400

The tu duan (土斷) is the abbreviation for yi tu duan (以土斷, means classifying people according to their present habitation to register). It was a policy to ensure the ancient hukou system working since the Western Jin. These terms were first recorded in the biographies of Wei Guan and Li Chong included in the Book of Jin:

今九域同規，大化方始，臣等以為宜皆蕩除末法，一擬古制，以土斷，定自公卿以下，皆以所居為正，無復懸客遠屬異土者。

然承魏氏凋弊之跡，人物播越，仕無常朝，人無定處，郎吏蓄於軍府，豪右聚於都邑，事體駁錯，與古不同。謂九品既除，宜先開移徙，聽相並就。且明貢舉之法，不濫於境外，則冠帶之倫將不分而自均，即土斷之實行矣。

Hence, it was perhaps initially proposed by these two people, but was only seriously implemented during the Eastern Jin and the Southern dynasties.

== Society and culture ==
=== Religion ===
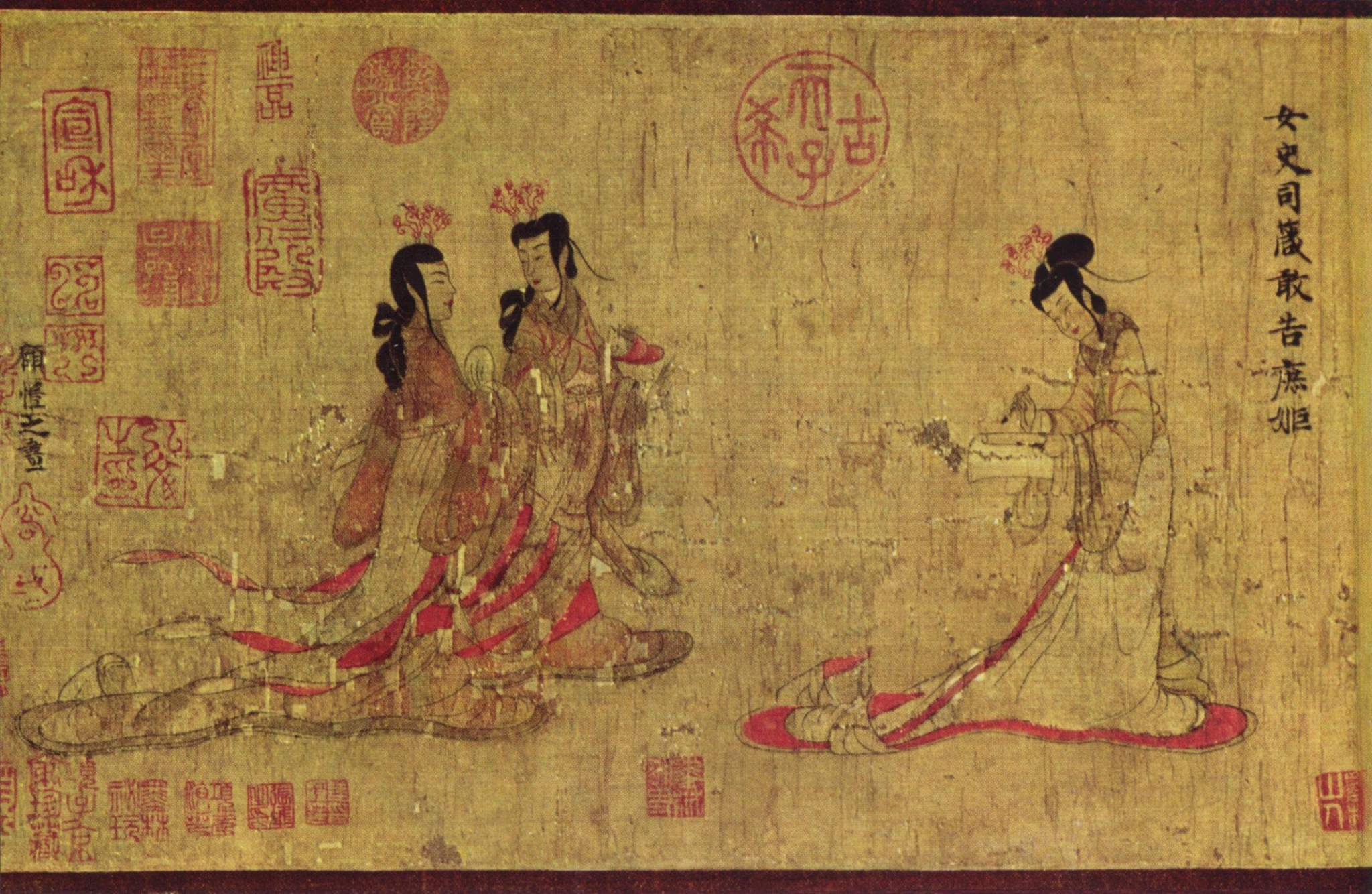
Scene of the Admonitions Scroll, traditionally considered as a Jin court painting by Gu Kaizhi (c. 345–406)

Taoism was polarised in the Jin dynasty. The Jin emperors repressed Taoists harshly, but also tried to exploit it, given the way it had been used near the end of the Han era in the Yellow Turban Rebellion. Amidst the political turmoil of the era, many successful merchants, small landowners, and other moderately comfortable people found great solace in Taoist teachings and a number of major clans and military officers also took up the faith. Ge Hong emphasized loyalty to the emperor as a Taoist virtue; he even taught that rebels could never be Taoist immortals, which made Taoism more palatable to the imperial hierarchy. As a result, popular Taoist religions were considered heterodoxy while the official schools of the court were supported, but the popular schools like the Tianshi Dao (Way of the Celestial Masters) were still secretly held dear and promulgated amongst ordinary people.

While the religion had been in China since the 1st century CE, the chaos of the Sixteen Kingdoms made Buddhism more popular, in part due to the non-Chinese finding solace in a foreign teaching and the focus on addressing suffering. With the northern states sponsoring the spread of Buddhism, the teaching soon permeated to the south as monks such as Zhi Dun and Dao'an engaged in scholarly "pure conversation" (清談; Qīngtán) debates with the ruling elites, marking a critical era for the Mahayana school in China. Even before the fall of Western Jin and Kumārajīva's 5th-century translations, there was the early and important translation of the Lotus Sutra by the monk Dharmarakṣa in 286. It was said that there were 1,768 Buddhist temples in the Eastern Jin.

Furthermore, Taoism advanced chemistry and medicine in China, whereas the contribution of Mahayana was concentrated in philosophy and literature.

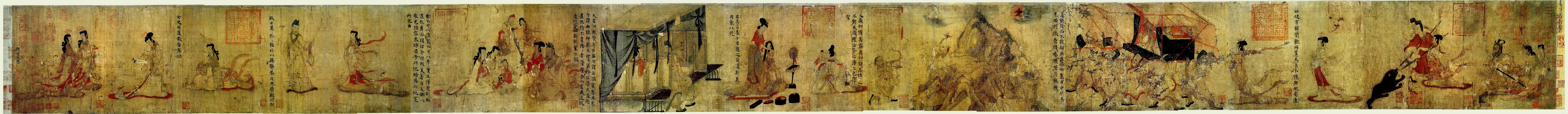
The British Museum copy of The Admonitions of the Instructress to the Court Ladies, attributed to Gu Kaizhi (c. 344–406), but likely a Tang-era copy

=== Material culture ===
The Jin dynasty is well known for the quality of its greenish celadon porcelain wares, which immediately followed the development of proto-celadon. Jar designs often incorporated animal, as well as Buddhist, figures. Examples of Yue ware are also known from the Jin dynasty.

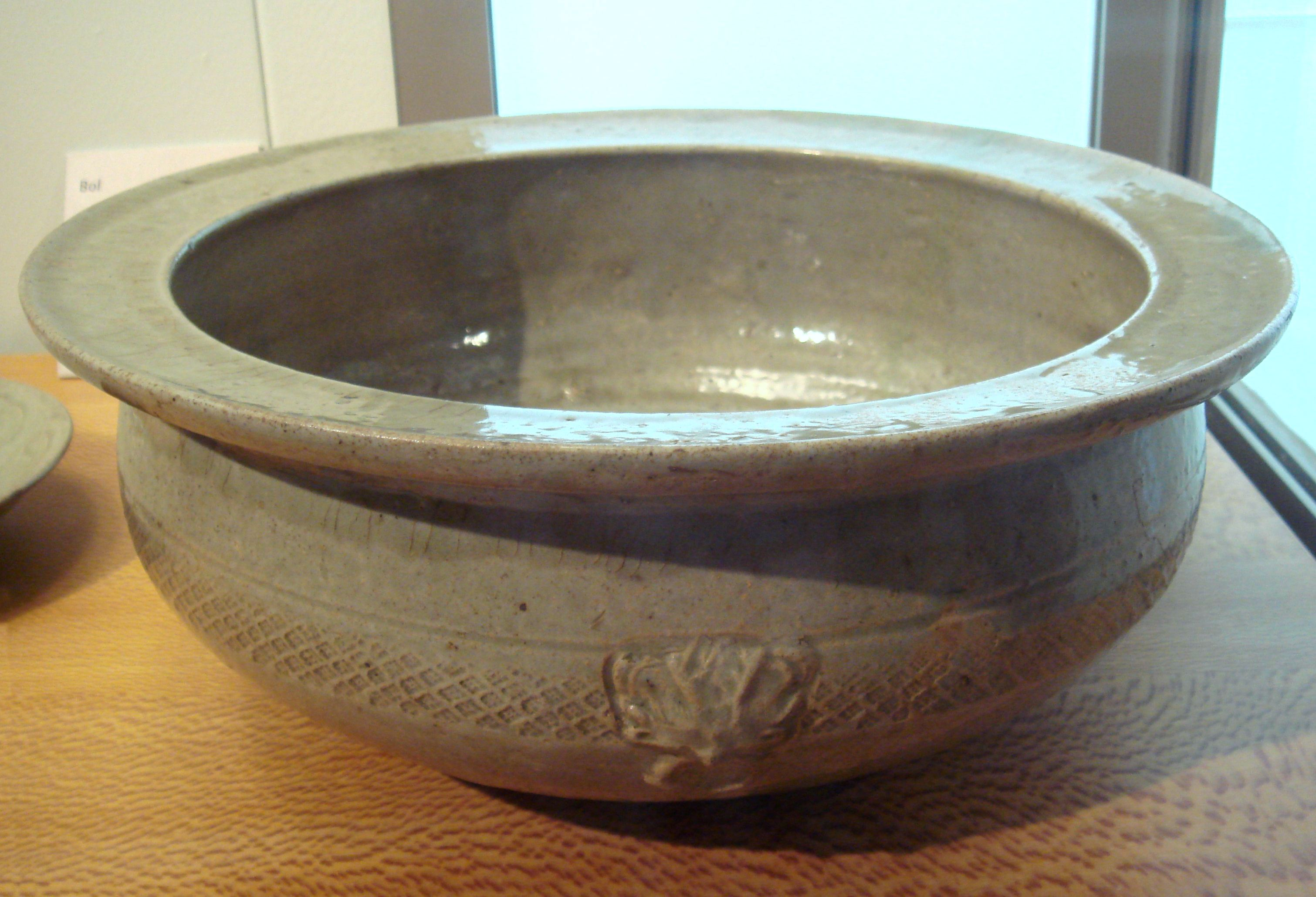
Yue ware with motif, 3rd century CE, Western Jin, Zhejiang.

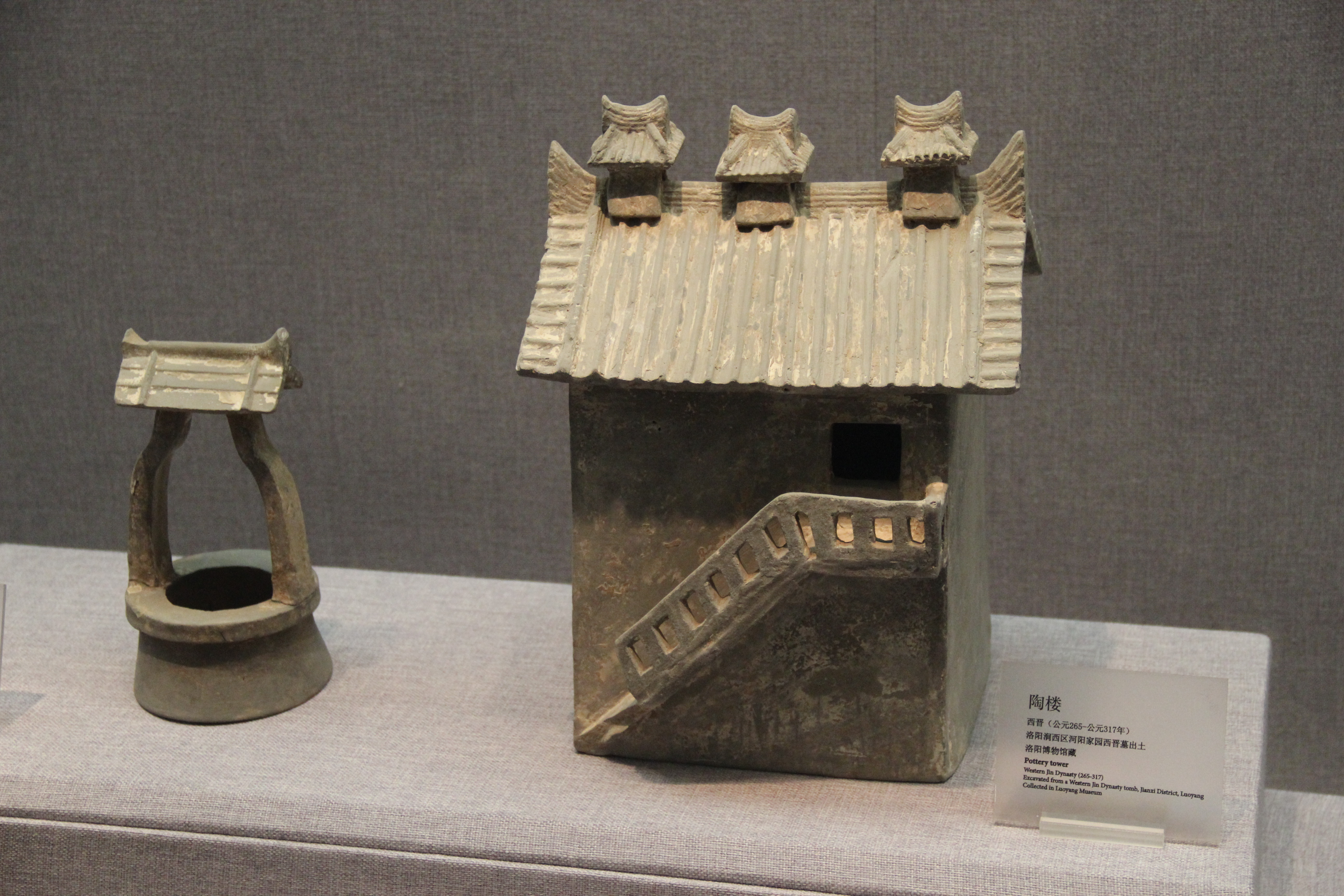
Pottery tower, Western Jin, 265–317 CE.

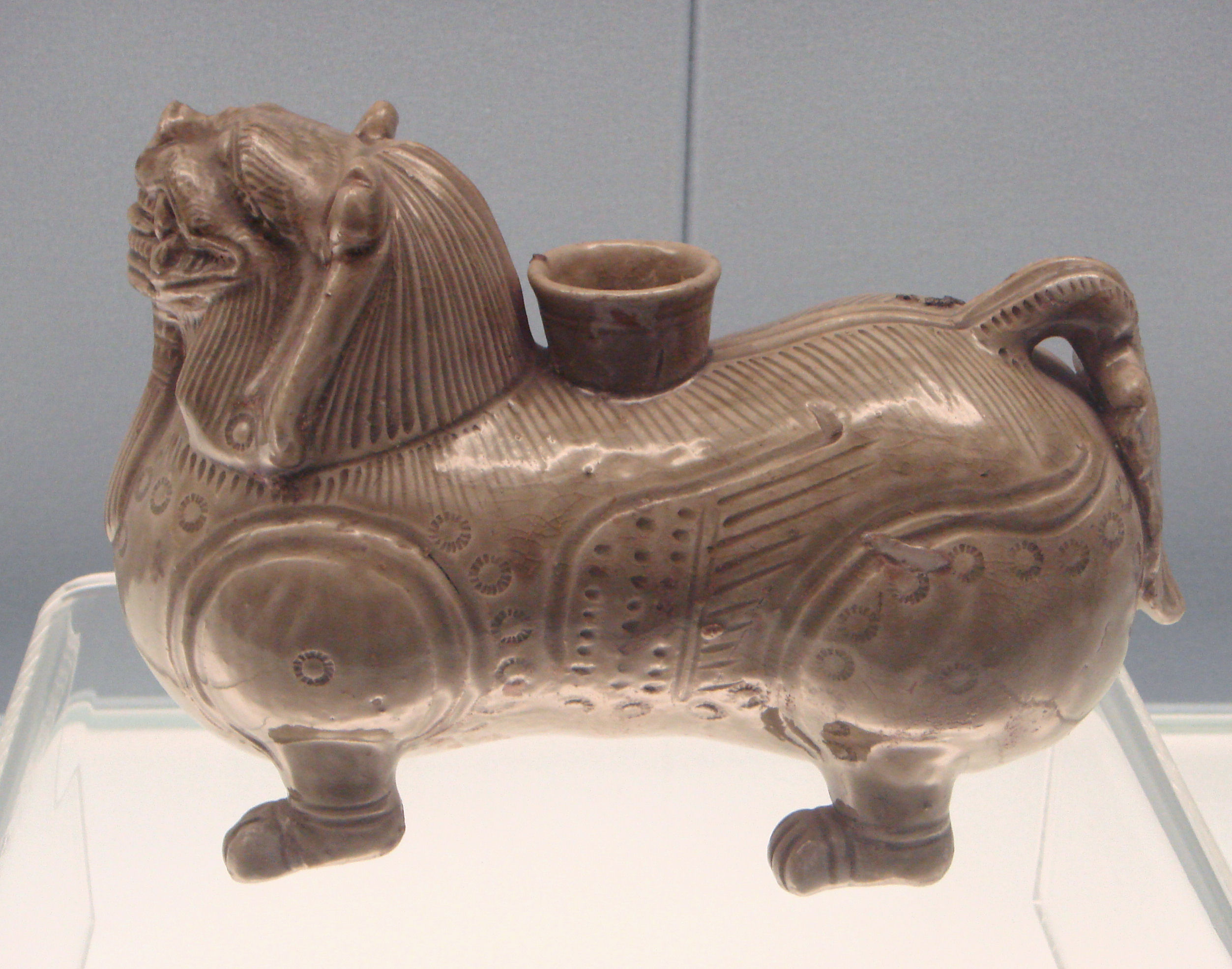
Celadon lion-shaped bixie, Western Jin, 265–317 CE.

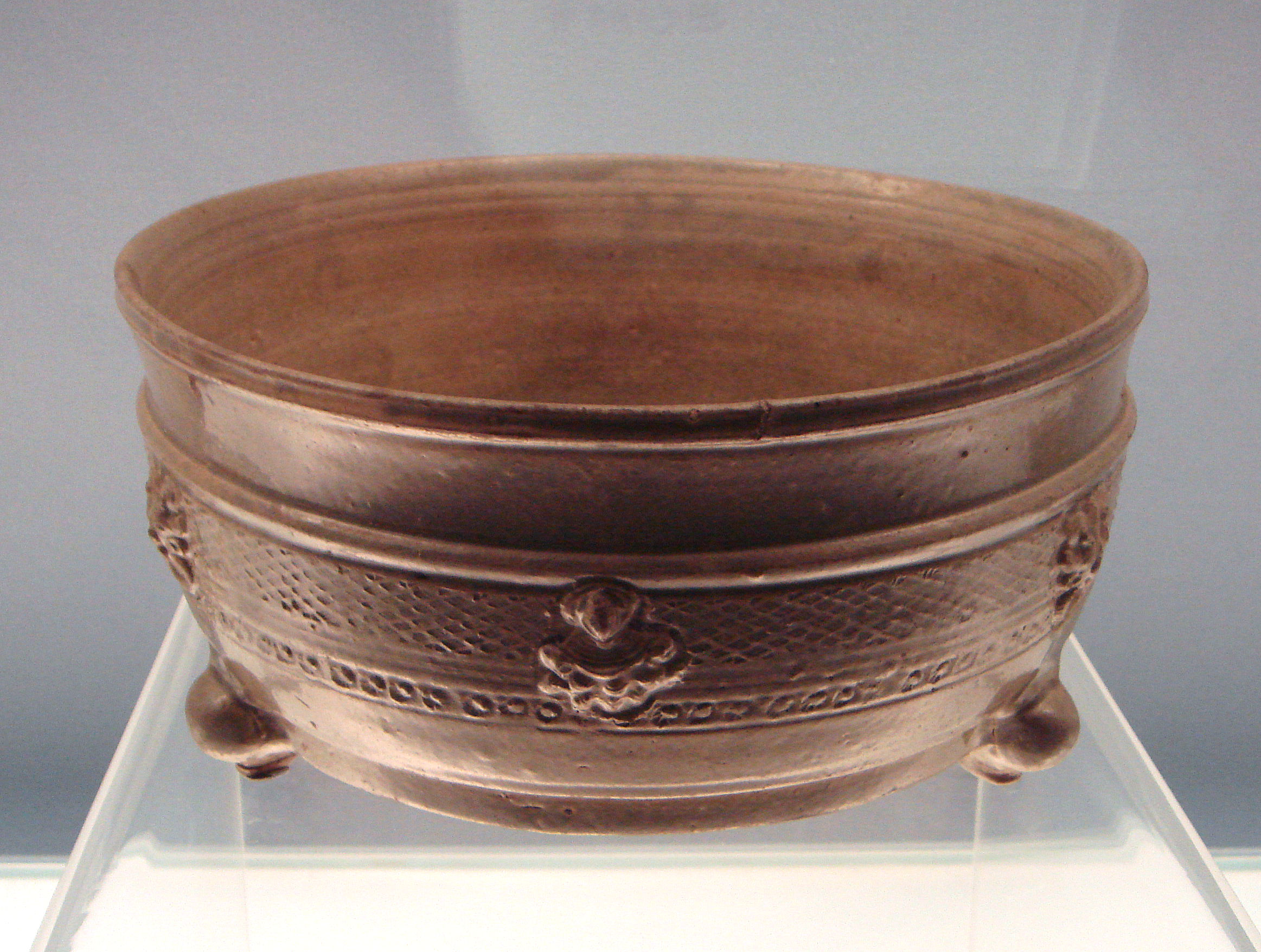
Celadon lian bowl with Buddhist figures, Western Jin, 265–317 CE.

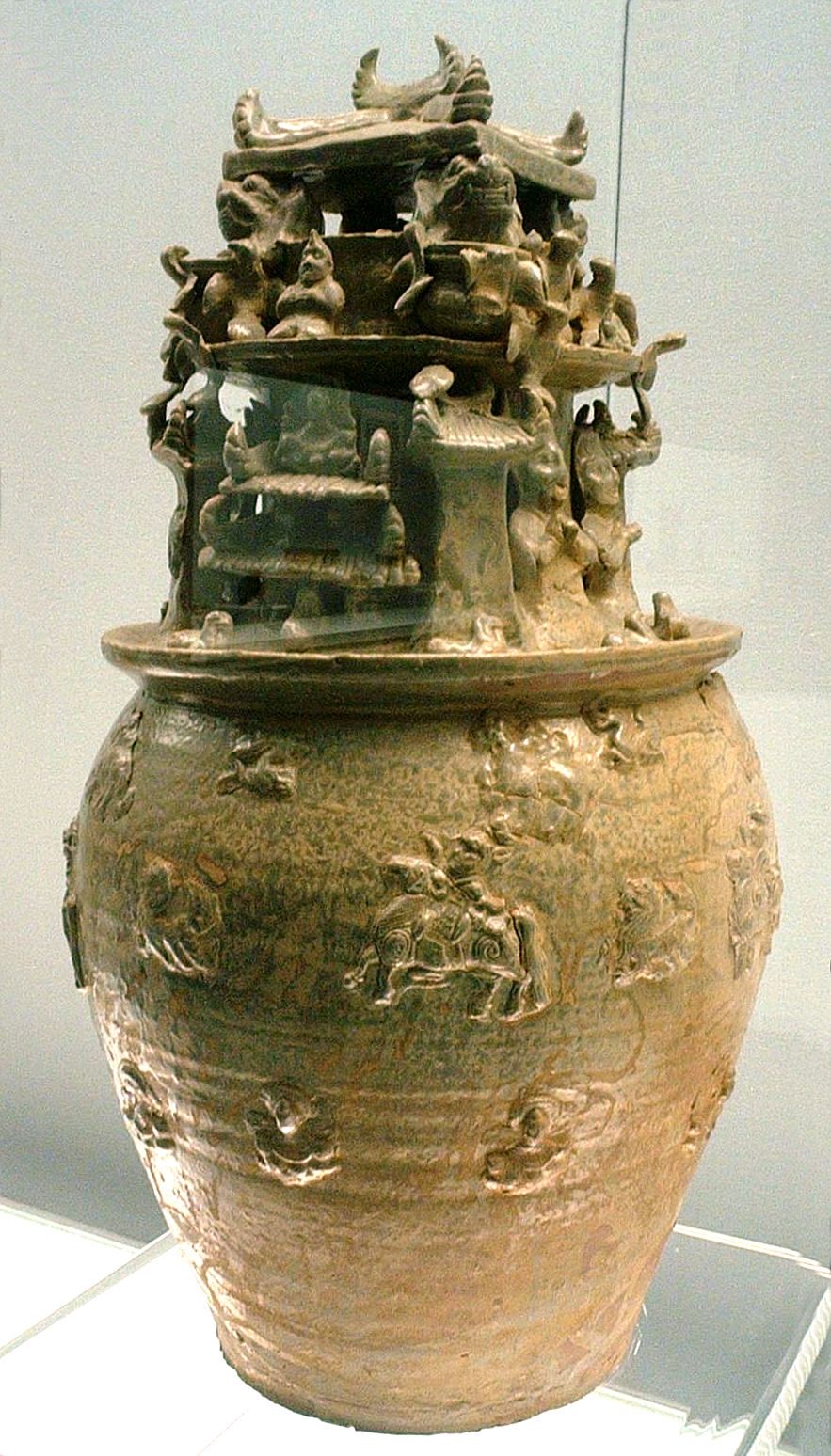
Hunping jar of the Western Jin, with Buddhist figures.

== List of emperors and eras ==
Posthumous names	Family name and given names	Durations of reigns	Era names and their according range of years	Territories
Western Jin dynasty 266–316
Wu	Sima Yan	266–290	Taishi, 266–274; Xianning, 275–280; Taikang, 280–289; Taixi, 28 January 290 – 17 May 290	Western Jin: Territorial extent of the Jin c. 280; Traditional Chinese: 西晉; Simplified Chinese: 西晋; Transcriptions; Standard Mandarin; Hanyu Pinyin: Xījìn; Wade–Giles: Hsi Chin; Yue: Cantonese; Yale Romanization: Sai^{1} Jeun^{3}; IPA: [sɐj˥ tsɵn˧]
Hui	Sima Zhong	290–307	Yongxi, 17 May 290 – 15 February 291; Yongping, 16 February – 23 April 291; Yuankang, 24April 291 – 6 February 300; Yongkang, 7 February 300 – 3 February 301; Yongning, 1 June 301 – 4 January 303; Taian, 5 January 303 – 21 February 304; Yongan, 22 February – 15 August 304; 25 December 304 – 3 February 305; Jianwu, 16 August – 24 December 304; Yongxing, 4 February 305 – 12 July 306; Guangxi, 13 July 306 – 19 February 307	Western Jin: Territorial extent of the Jin c. 280; Traditional Chinese: 西晉; Simplified Chinese: 西晋; Transcriptions; Standard Mandarin; Hanyu Pinyin: Xījìn; Wade–Giles: Hsi Chin; Yue: Cantonese; Yale Romanization: Sai^{1} Jeun^{3}; IPA: [sɐj˥ tsɵn˧]
none	Sima Lun	301	Jianshi, 3 February – 1 June 301	Western Jin: Territorial extent of the Jin c. 280; Traditional Chinese: 西晉; Simplified Chinese: 西晋; Transcriptions; Standard Mandarin; Hanyu Pinyin: Xījìn; Wade–Giles: Hsi Chin; Yue: Cantonese; Yale Romanization: Sai^{1} Jeun^{3}; IPA: [sɐj˥ tsɵn˧]
Huai	Sima Chi	307–311	Yongjia, 307 – 313	Western Jin: Territorial extent of the Jin c. 280; Traditional Chinese: 西晉; Simplified Chinese: 西晋; Transcriptions; Standard Mandarin; Hanyu Pinyin: Xījìn; Wade–Giles: Hsi Chin; Yue: Cantonese; Yale Romanization: Sai^{1} Jeun^{3}; IPA: [sɐj˥ tsɵn˧]
Min	Sima Ye	313–316	Jianxing, 313–316	Western Jin: Territorial extent of the Jin c. 280; Traditional Chinese: 西晉; Simplified Chinese: 西晋; Transcriptions; Standard Mandarin; Hanyu Pinyin: Xījìn; Wade–Giles: Hsi Chin; Yue: Cantonese; Yale Romanization: Sai^{1} Jeun^{3}; IPA: [sɐj˥ tsɵn˧]
Eastern Jin dynasty 317–420
Yuan	Sima Rui	317–323	Jianwu, 317–318; Taixing, 318–322; Yongchang, 322–323	Eastern Jin: The Jin Empire (yellow), c. 400 (Eastern Jin); Traditional Chinese: 東晉; Simplified Chinese: 东晋; Transcriptions; Standard Mandarin; Hanyu Pinyin: Dōngjìn; Wade–Giles: Tung Chin; Yue: Cantonese; Yale Romanization: Dung^{1} Jeun^{3}; IPA: [tʊŋ˥ tsɵn˧]
Ming	Sima Shao	323–325	Taining, 323–326	Eastern Jin: The Jin Empire (yellow), c. 400 (Eastern Jin); Traditional Chinese: 東晉; Simplified Chinese: 东晋; Transcriptions; Standard Mandarin; Hanyu Pinyin: Dōngjìn; Wade–Giles: Tung Chin; Yue: Cantonese; Yale Romanization: Dung^{1} Jeun^{3}; IPA: [tʊŋ˥ tsɵn˧]
Cheng	Sima Yan	325–342	Xianhe, 326–335; Xiankang, 335–342	Eastern Jin: The Jin Empire (yellow), c. 400 (Eastern Jin); Traditional Chinese: 東晉; Simplified Chinese: 东晋; Transcriptions; Standard Mandarin; Hanyu Pinyin: Dōngjìn; Wade–Giles: Tung Chin; Yue: Cantonese; Yale Romanization: Dung^{1} Jeun^{3}; IPA: [tʊŋ˥ tsɵn˧]
Kang	Sima Yue	342–344	Jianyuan, 343–344	Eastern Jin: The Jin Empire (yellow), c. 400 (Eastern Jin); Traditional Chinese: 東晉; Simplified Chinese: 东晋; Transcriptions; Standard Mandarin; Hanyu Pinyin: Dōngjìn; Wade–Giles: Tung Chin; Yue: Cantonese; Yale Romanization: Dung^{1} Jeun^{3}; IPA: [tʊŋ˥ tsɵn˧]
Mu	Sima Dan	344–361	Yonghe, 345–357; Shengping, 357–361	Eastern Jin: The Jin Empire (yellow), c. 400 (Eastern Jin); Traditional Chinese: 東晉; Simplified Chinese: 东晋; Transcriptions; Standard Mandarin; Hanyu Pinyin: Dōngjìn; Wade–Giles: Tung Chin; Yue: Cantonese; Yale Romanization: Dung^{1} Jeun^{3}; IPA: [tʊŋ˥ tsɵn˧]
Ai	Sima Pi	361–365	Longhe, 362–363; Xingning, 363–365	Eastern Jin: The Jin Empire (yellow), c. 400 (Eastern Jin); Traditional Chinese: 東晉; Simplified Chinese: 东晋; Transcriptions; Standard Mandarin; Hanyu Pinyin: Dōngjìn; Wade–Giles: Tung Chin; Yue: Cantonese; Yale Romanization: Dung^{1} Jeun^{3}; IPA: [tʊŋ˥ tsɵn˧]
none	Sima Yi	365–372	Taihe, 365–372	Eastern Jin: The Jin Empire (yellow), c. 400 (Eastern Jin); Traditional Chinese: 東晉; Simplified Chinese: 东晋; Transcriptions; Standard Mandarin; Hanyu Pinyin: Dōngjìn; Wade–Giles: Tung Chin; Yue: Cantonese; Yale Romanization: Dung^{1} Jeun^{3}; IPA: [tʊŋ˥ tsɵn˧]
Jianwen	Sima Yu	372	Xianan, 372–373	Eastern Jin: The Jin Empire (yellow), c. 400 (Eastern Jin); Traditional Chinese: 東晉; Simplified Chinese: 东晋; Transcriptions; Standard Mandarin; Hanyu Pinyin: Dōngjìn; Wade–Giles: Tung Chin; Yue: Cantonese; Yale Romanization: Dung^{1} Jeun^{3}; IPA: [tʊŋ˥ tsɵn˧]
Xiaowu	Sima Yao	372–396	Ningkang, 373–375; Taiyuan (太元), 376–396	Eastern Jin: The Jin Empire (yellow), c. 400 (Eastern Jin); Traditional Chinese: 東晉; Simplified Chinese: 东晋; Transcriptions; Standard Mandarin; Hanyu Pinyin: Dōngjìn; Wade–Giles: Tung Chin; Yue: Cantonese; Yale Romanization: Dung^{1} Jeun^{3}; IPA: [tʊŋ˥ tsɵn˧]
An	Sima Dezong	396–419	Longan, 397–402; Yuanxing, 402–405; Yixi, 405–419	Eastern Jin: The Jin Empire (yellow), c. 400 (Eastern Jin); Traditional Chinese: 東晉; Simplified Chinese: 东晋; Transcriptions; Standard Mandarin; Hanyu Pinyin: Dōngjìn; Wade–Giles: Tung Chin; Yue: Cantonese; Yale Romanization: Dung^{1} Jeun^{3}; IPA: [tʊŋ˥ tsɵn˧]
Gong	Sima Dewen	419–420	Yuanxi, 419–420	Eastern Jin: The Jin Empire (yellow), c. 400 (Eastern Jin); Traditional Chinese: 東晉; Simplified Chinese: 东晋; Transcriptions; Standard Mandarin; Hanyu Pinyin: Dōngjìn; Wade–Giles: Tung Chin; Yue: Cantonese; Yale Romanization: Dung^{1} Jeun^{3}; IPA: [tʊŋ˥ tsɵn˧]

== Major events ==
Jin dynasty
- Traditional Chinese: 晉朝
- Simplified Chinese: 晋朝
Transcriptions
Standard Mandarin
- Hanyu Pinyin: Jìn cháo
- Gwoyeu Romatzyh: Jinn Chaur
- Wade–Giles: Chin^{4} Ch'ao^{2}
- IPA: [tɕîn ʈʂʰǎʊ]
Yue: Cantonese
- Yale Romanization: Jeun^{3} Chiu^{4}
- Jyutping: Zeon^{3} Ciu^{4}
- IPA: [tsɵn˧ tsʰiw˩]
Southern Min
- Tâi-lô: Tsìn Tiâu
Middle Chinese
- Middle Chinese: Tsìn Djew

Sima Jin
- Traditional Chinese: 司馬晉
- Simplified Chinese: 司马晋
Transcriptions
Standard Mandarin
- Hanyu Pinyin: Sīmǎ Jìn
- Wade–Giles: Ssu-ma Chin
Yue: Cantonese
- Yale Romanization: Si^{1}ma^{5} Jeun^{3}
- IPA: [si˥ ma˩˧ tsɵn˧]

Liang Jin
- Traditional Chinese: 兩晉
- Simplified Chinese: 两晋
- Literal meaning: Two Jins
Transcriptions
Standard Mandarin
- Hanyu Pinyin: Liǎng Jìn
- Wade–Giles: Liang Chin
Yue: Cantonese
- Yale Romanization: Leung^{2} Jeun^{3}
- IPA: [lœŋ˧˥ tsɵn˧]

- Conquest of Wu by Jin
- Battle of Fei River
- Butterfly Lovers
- War of the Eight Princes
- Upheaval of the Five Barbarians

== See also ==
- List of tributaries of Imperial China
- Liu Song dynasty
- Romance of the Three Kingdoms
- Fugan Temple
- Five Barbarians

Preceded by Three Kingdoms	Jin dynasty 266–420	Succeeded by Liu Song
