= Gao Ziru =

Chinese minister and official

Gao Ziru (Chinese: 高子儒; pinyin: Gāozirú, 508–548 CE) was a Chinese minister and official of Eastern Wei with the courtesy name Xiaoli (Chinese: 孝禮; pinyin: Xiào lǐ).

== History ==
He was from Bohai Commandery. Gao Ziru was the son of Gao Qianzhi and the grandson of Gao Chong. He was a minister of Northern Wei and Eastern Wei. He held many positions. Gao Ziru inherited his father's title, served as Tongzhilang (Chinese: 通直郎; pinyin: Tōng zhí láng), General Andong (Chinese: 安東將軍; pinyin: Āndōng jiāngjūn), Zhongbing canjun (Chinese: 中兵參軍; pinyin: Zhōng bīng cānjūn), and served as Imperial Censor of the Palace (Chinese: 殿中侍御史; pinyin: Diànzhōng shì yù shǐ). He further served as Jian hu shi (Chinese: 檢戶使; pinyin: Jiǎn hù shǐ) in Liangzhou, Northern Yuzhou, and Western Yanzhou.

He died in the sixth year of Wuding, aged forty-one.
