= Sima Jinlong =

Prince and general

Sima Jinlong 司馬金龍
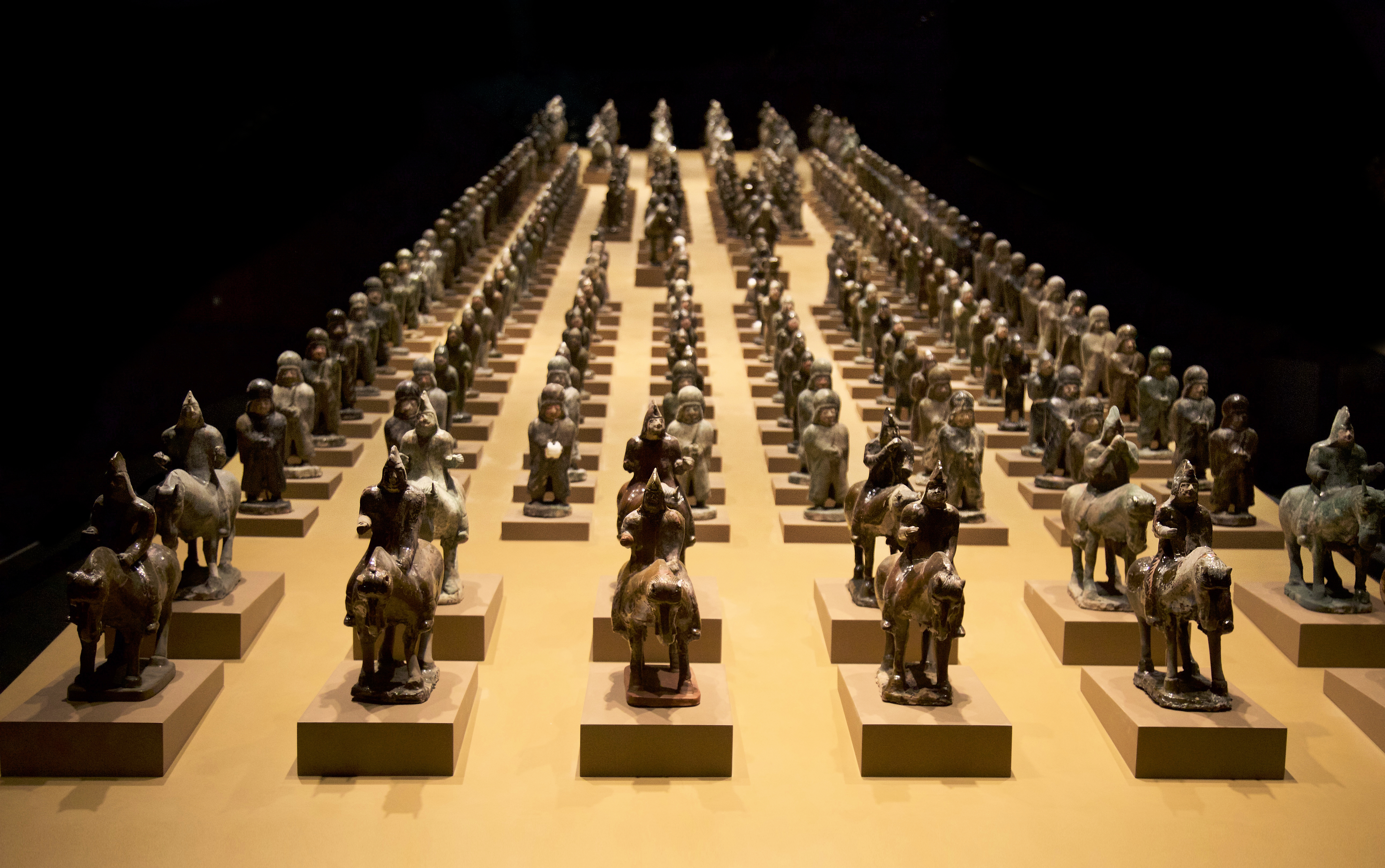
- Army of terracotta figurines in Xianbei uniform, tomb of Sima Jinlong.
- Created: 484 CE
- Discovered: Datong, Shanxi province.

Location

Sima Jinlong (Chinese: 司馬金龍; after 420-484), courtesy name Rongze (榮則), was a Han–Xianbei prince and general of the Tuoba-led Northern Wei dynasty of China, whose tomb was discovered in the village of Shijia, Datong, Shanxi.

Sima Jinlong was of mixed Han and Xianbei heritage: he was the son of the Eastern Jin prince Sima Chuzhi (司馬楚之), who had become a refugee at the court of the Northern Wei dynasty when the Eastern Jin dynasty collapsed in 420, and his mother was a Northern Wei princess. After 420, Sima Chuzhi served as a general in the northern Wei army until his death when he was buried in the imperial tomb enclosure. Sima Jinlong spent his whole life among the Northern Wei, and married the daughter of the Northern Liang ruler Juqu Mujian. His son Sima Huilang lived among the Wei with full honors, as an officer in the army, but his actual role seems to have been minor compared to his father, as he his only mentioned briefly after his father in official chronicles, such as the Book of Wei (37) and Bei Shi (29).

His tomb, of an impressive size, is dated to 484 CE and was found in the Northern Wei capital. The bodies of the deceased had been placed on an elaborately carved stone couch. Many terra-cotta funerary figures were found in the tomb, which are characteristic of the Northern Wei. They represent the progressive absorption of Han influences into the artistic productions of the Xianbei people under the rule of the Tuoba imperial clan.

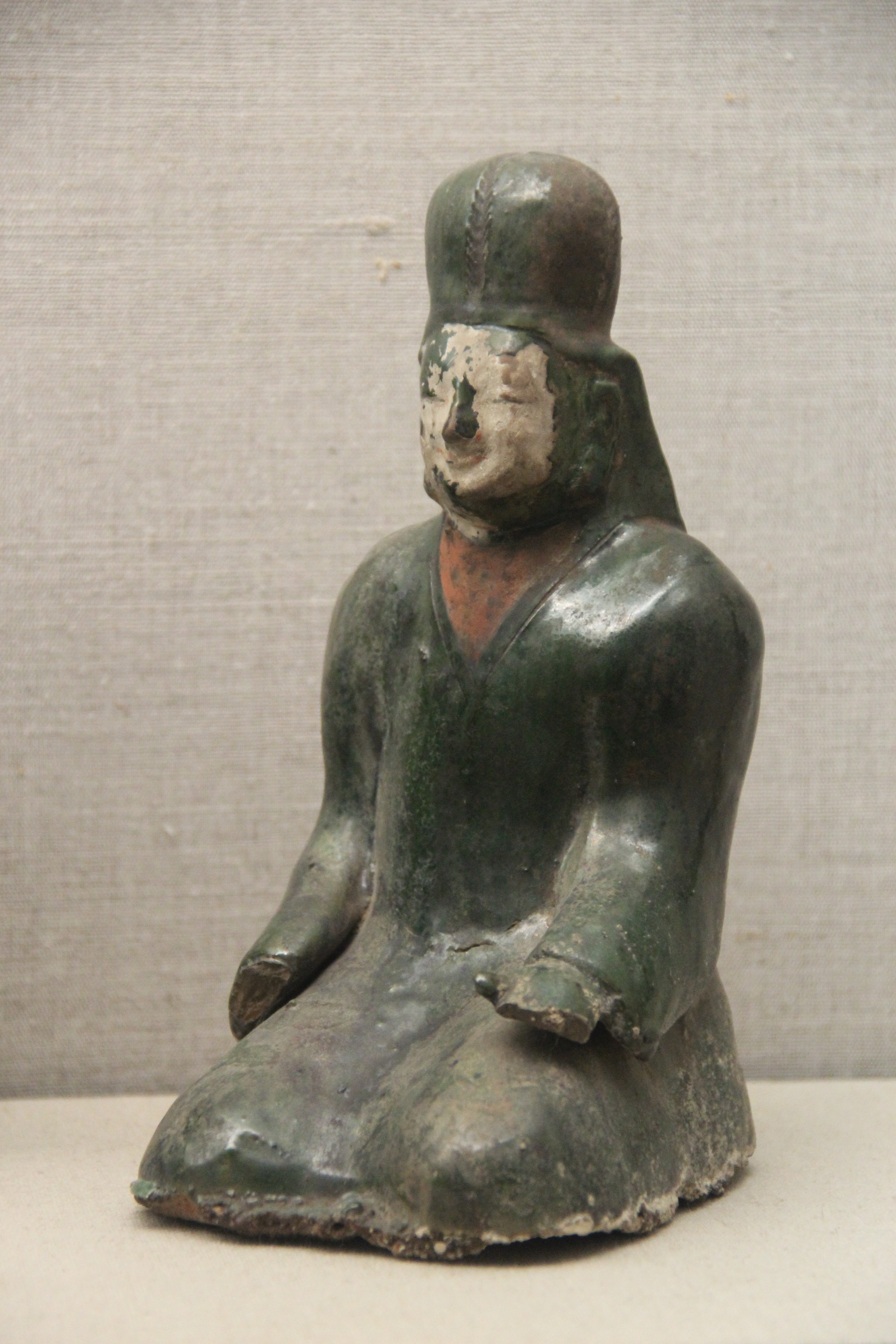
Xianbei female attendant, probably a musician. Tomb of Sima Jinlong, 484 CE.

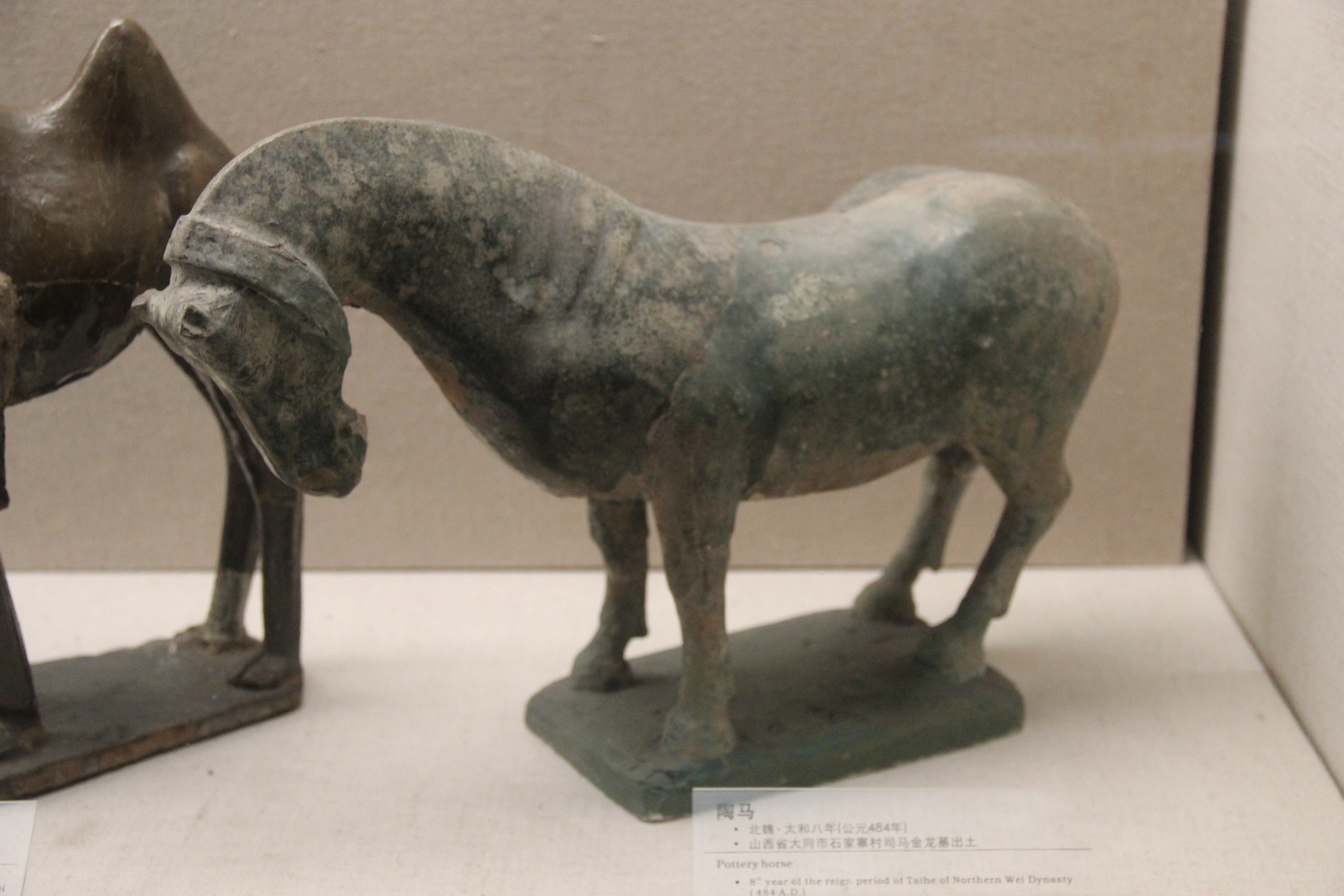
Northern Wei Pottery Figure, Tomb of Sima Jinlong, 484 CE

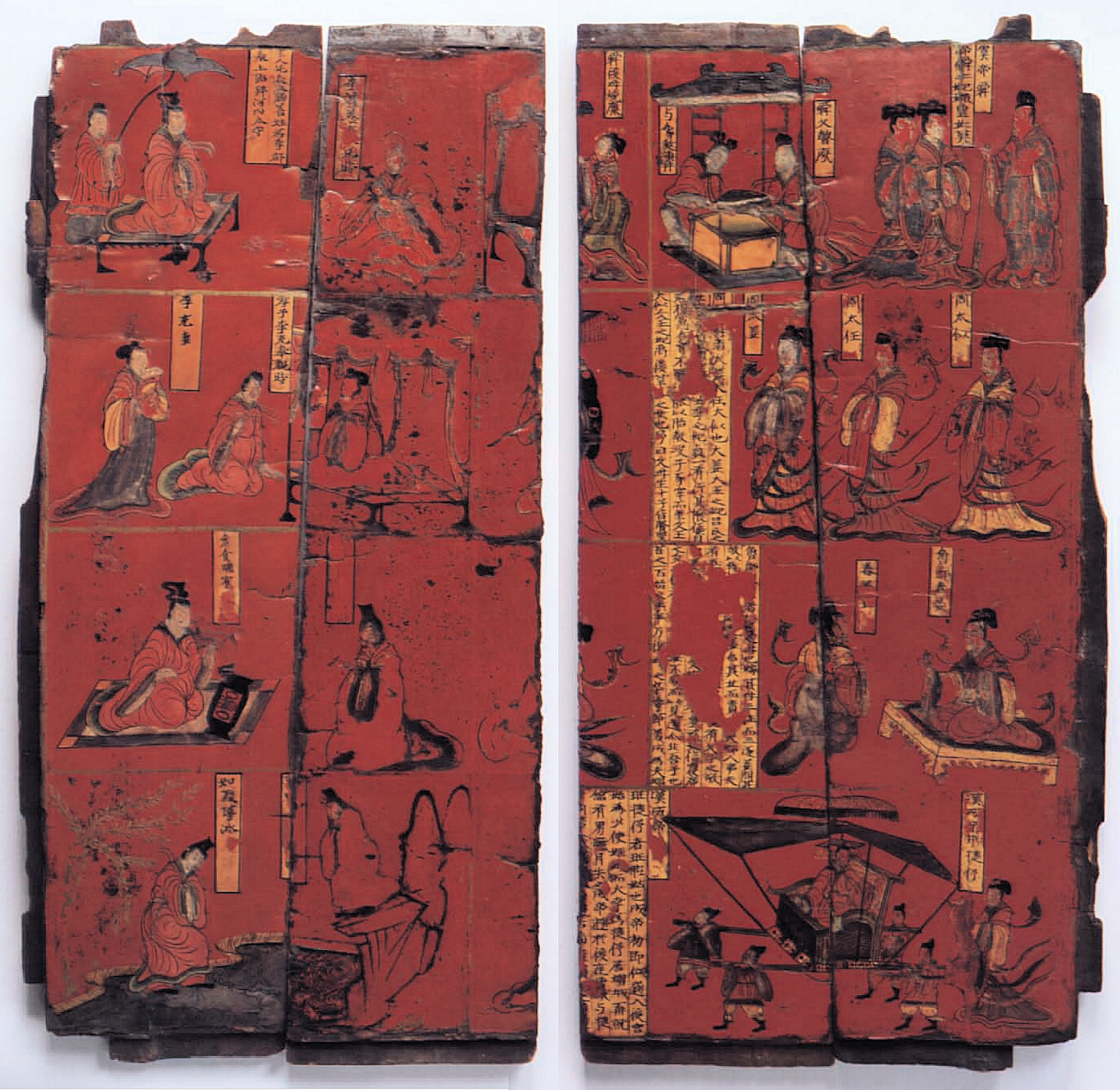
Lacquer screen, from the tomb of Sima Jinlong, 484 CE. Probably brought from the court of the southern Jin dynasty by Jinlong's father.

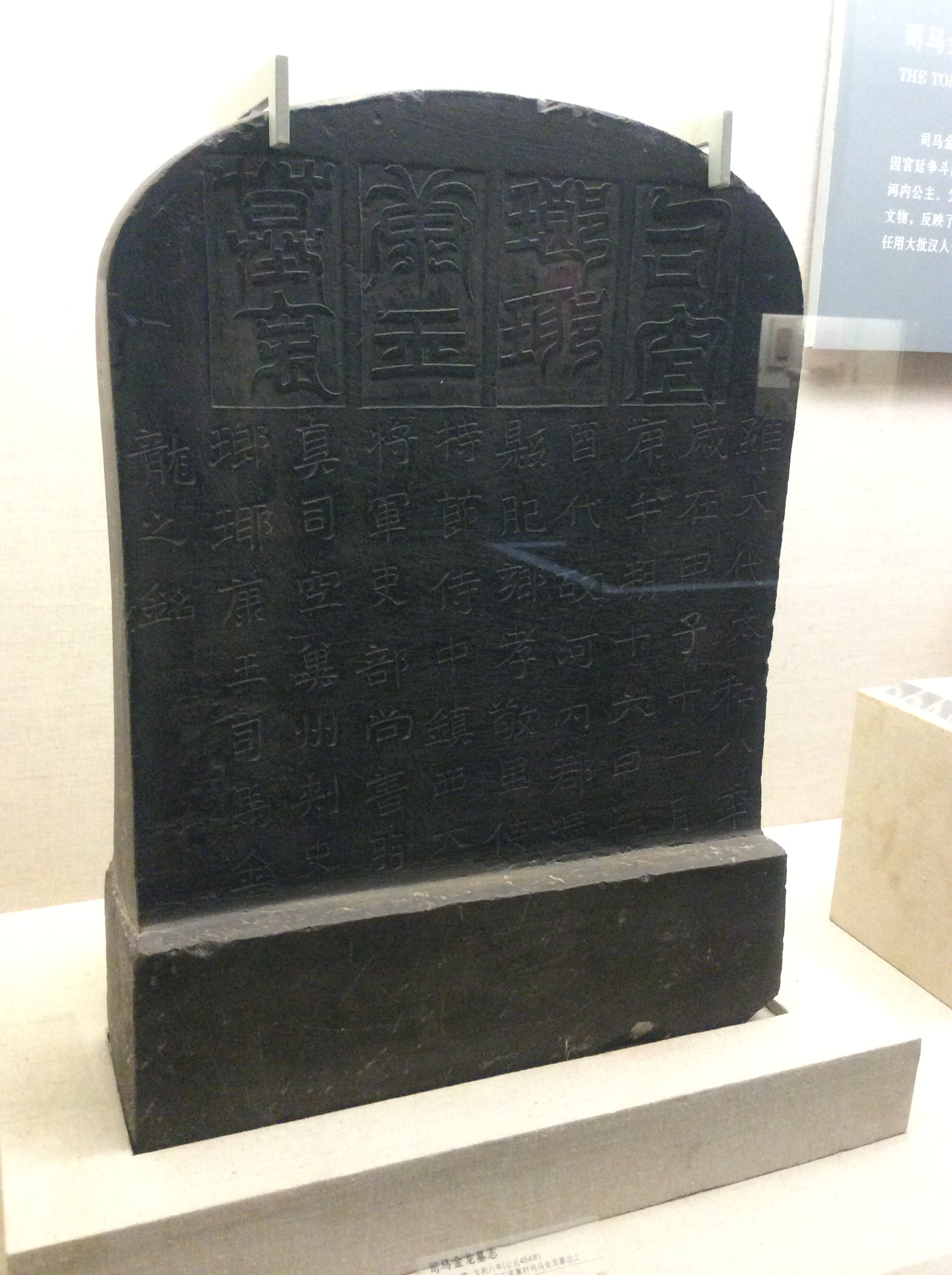
Tomb plaque of Sima Jinlong.

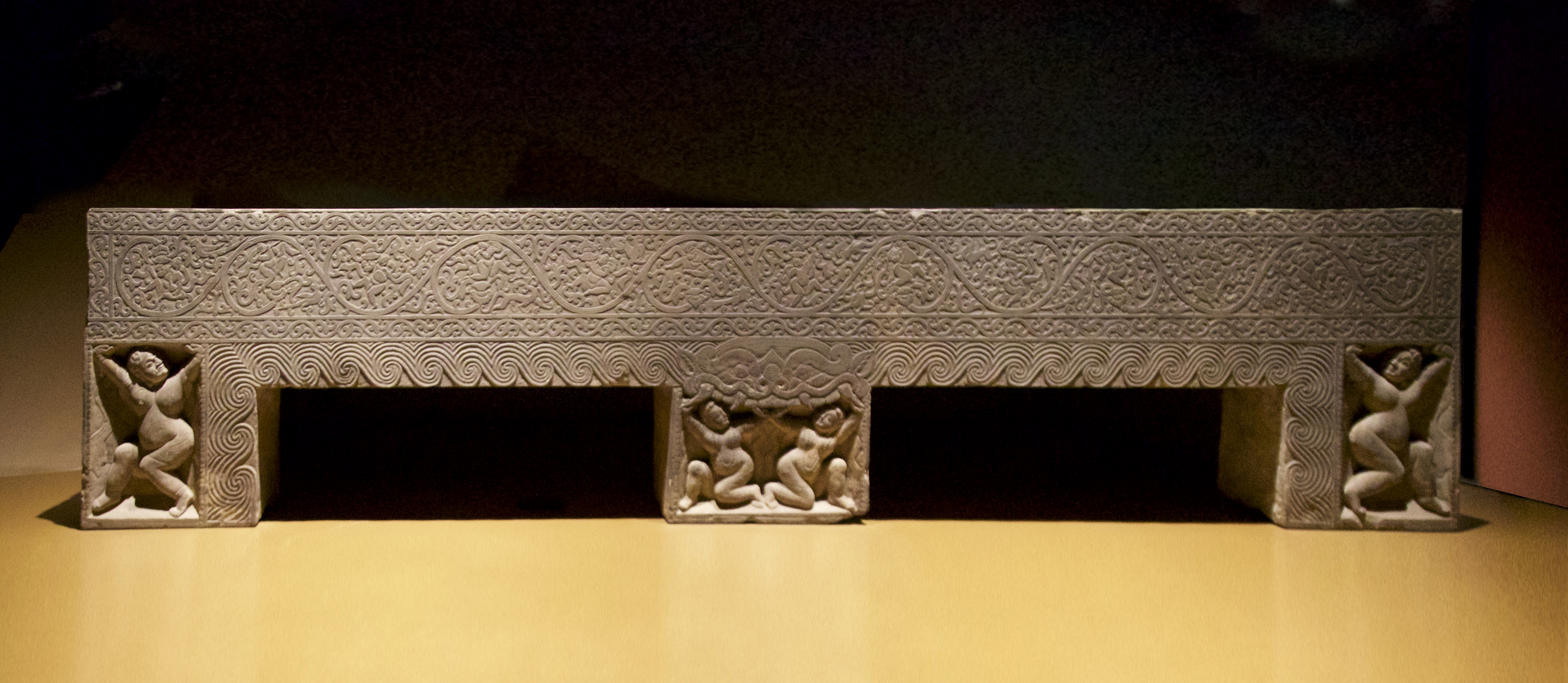
Elaborately carved stone funerary bed of Sima Jinlong, 484 CE.

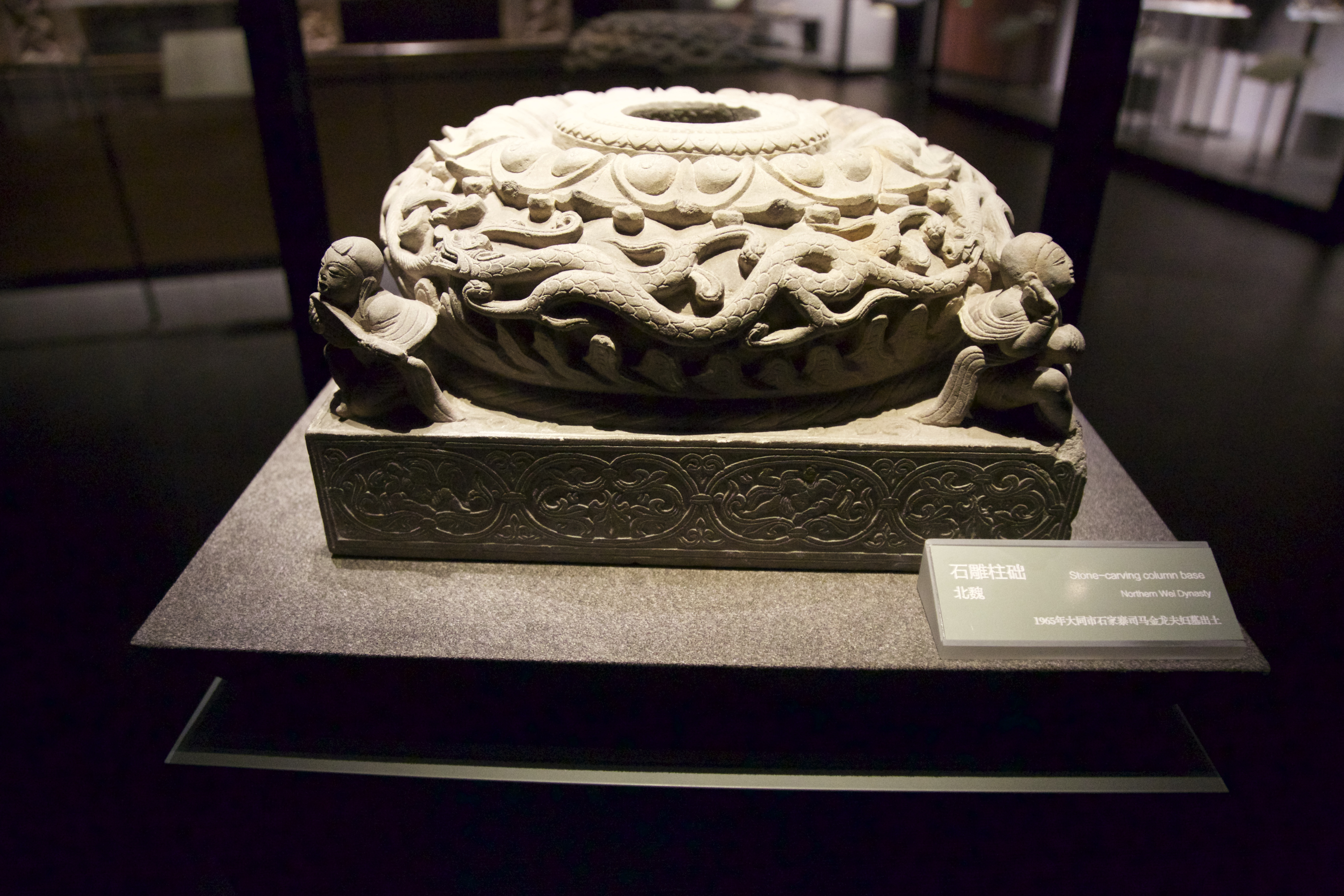
Carved stone column base, Tomb of Sima Jinlong.
