= Gao Gongzhi =

Chinese political figure

Gao Gongzhi (Chinese: 高恭之; pinyin: Gāo gōng zhī, 489–530 CE) was a political figure in the Northern Wei Dynasty with the courtesy name of Daomu (Chinese: 道讓; pinyin: Dào mù). He was from Bohai Commandery.

== History ==
Gao Gongzhi was the son of Gao Chong and the younger brother of Gao Qianzhi. During the period of Xiping, he served as a censor. Gao Gongzhi had reported on Li Shizhe, the prefect of Xiangzhou. During the Zhengguang era, he obtained the qualification to be invited by the court, and later served as Taiwei Kaicao (Chinese: 太尉鎧曹參軍; pinyin: Tài wèi kǎi cáo cān jūn) and Xiao Baoyin's Tailangzhong (Chinese: 行台郎中; pinyin: Xíng tái lángzhōng). During the Xiaochang years, Li Shizhe's younger brother Li Shengui became the favored minister of Empress Hu and framed Gao Gongzhi's older brother Gao Qianzhi.

After Emperor Xiaozhuang of Wei ascended the throne, Gao Gongzhi served as Shangshu Sangong (Chinese: 三公; pinyin: Sāngōng), General Ning Shuo (Chinese: 寧朔將軍; pinyin: Níng shuò jiāngjūn) and Shibu Langzhong (Chinese: 吏部郎中; pinyin: Lì bù lángzhōng), and was named Longcheng Marquis (Chinese: 龙城侯; pinyin: Lóng chéng hóu), and later served as Taishe Zhangshi (Chinese: 太射长史; pinyin: Tài shè zhǎng shǐ), and was appointed Duke of Anxi County. After Yuan Hao was eliminated, Gao Gongzhi served as General Zhengnan (Chinese: 征南將軍; pinyin: Zhēng nán jiāngjūn), Jinzi Guanglu (Chinese: 金紫光禄大夫; pinyin: Jīn zǐguāng lù dàfū), Lieutenant of the Imperial Censor (Chinese: 御史中尉; pinyin: Yù shǐ zhōngwèi) and Huangmen (Chinese: 黃門; pinyin: Huáng mén). After Erzhu Rong's death, Gao Gongzhi added the titles of General Wei (Chinese: 衛將軍; pinyin: Wèi jiāngjūn), acting General of Chariots and Cavalry (Chinese: 代理車騎將軍; pinyin: Dàilǐ chē qí jiāngjūn), Grand Governor (Chinese: 大都督; pinyin: Dà dūdū), and concurrently served as Shangshu Youpushe (Chinese: 尚書右僕射; pinyin: Shàngshū yòu pú shè), Daxingtai (Chinese: 大行台; pinyin: Dà xíng tái) of Nandao, and soon as Cavalry General (Chinese: 車騎將軍; pinyin: Chē qí jiāngjūn). In the third year of Yong'an (530), Erzhu Shilong attacked Luoyang, and Gao Gong once repelled Erzhu Shilong. Soon after Erzhu Zhao invaded Luoyang, Gao Gongzhi resigned. Shortly thereafter, Gao Gongzhi was killed by Erzhu Shilong. During the Taichang years, the court posthumously named him the Provincial Governor (Chinese: 刺史; pinyin: Cìshǐ) of Yongzhou.
