= Wu Wei =

Wu Wei may refer to:

- Wu wei, an important tenet of Taoism that involves knowing when to act and when not to act
- Wu Wei (actress), Hong Kong actress
- Wu Wei (footballer, born 1983), Chinese football player
- Wu Wei (footballer, born 1997), Chinese football player
- Wu Wei (musician) (born 1970), Berlin-based Chinese musician and sheng virtuoso
- Wu Wei (painter) (1459–1508), Chinese landscape painter during the Ming Dynasty
- Maggie Wei Wu, Chinese business executive and CFO of Alibaba Group
- Wei Wu Wei (1895–1986), British Taoist philosopher and writer
- Ng Wei (born 1981), Chinese-Hong Kong badminton player
- Wu Wei, 1993 album and recording by guitarist Pierre Bensusan

== See also ==
- Wuwei (disambiguation)
