= Fugan Temple =

Buddhist temple in Chengdu, China

Coordinates: 30.6665°N 104.0525°E

Fugan Temple (Chinese: 福感寺; pinyin: fúgǎn sì) was a famous Buddhist temple in Chengdu, Sichuan province, China. It was established during the Eastern Jin (317–420), and remained in use until the Southern Song (1127–1279). It later fell into disrepair, and was eventually lost.

In 2016 the ruins of the temple were excavated by a team of archaeologists at a site on Shiye Street in Chengdu. In addition to the foundations of temple buildings and pagodas, the archaeologists discovered more than a thousand stone tablets inscribed with Buddhist texts, and another five hundred pieces of stone sculpture.
