= Dingyuan County =

Coordinates: 32°27′46″N 117°35′34″E

Dingyuan 定远县 Tingyuan
- County
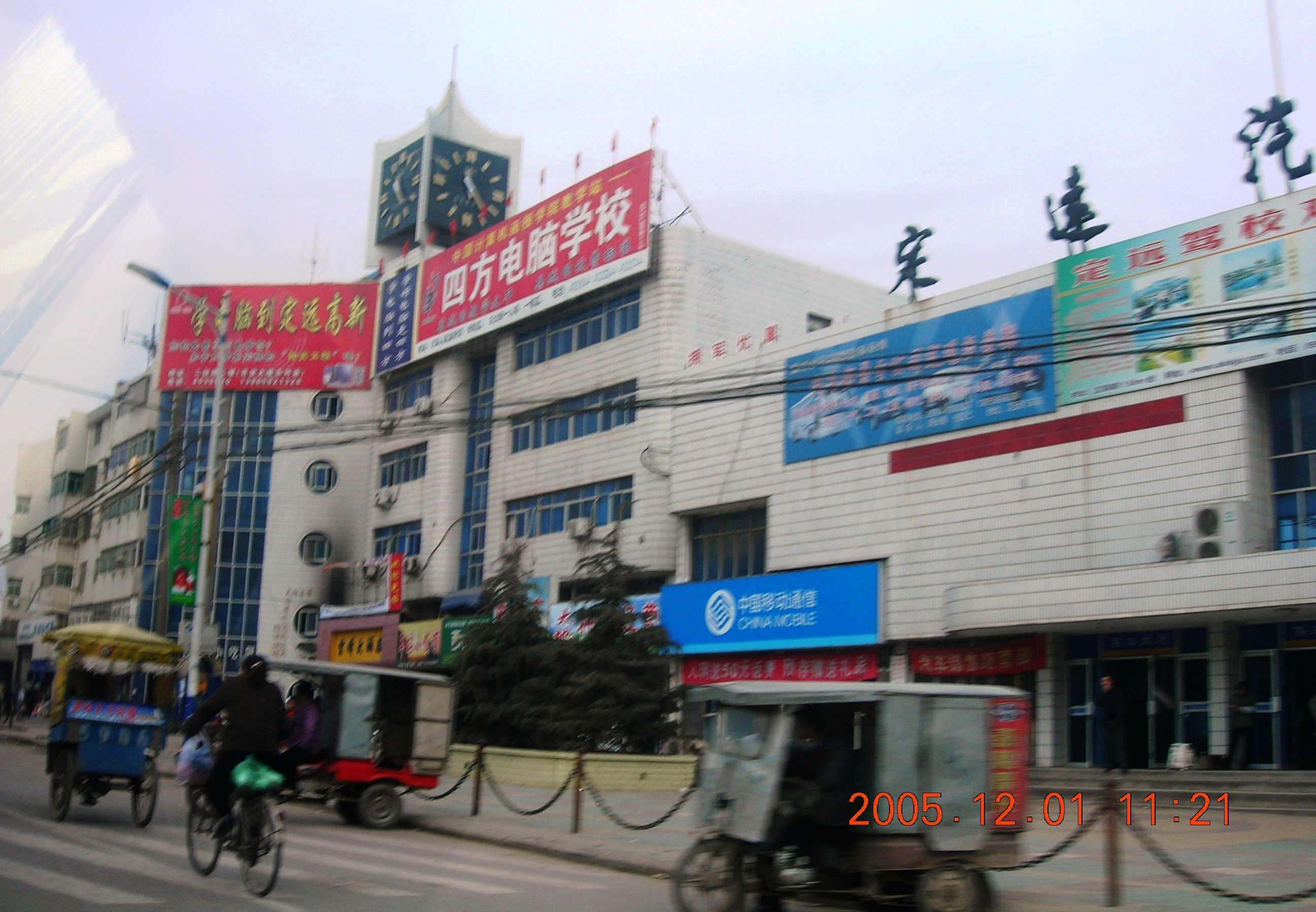
- Interactive map of Dingyuan
- Country: People's Republic of China
- Province: Anhui
- Prefecture-level city: Chuzhou

Area
  - Total: 2,998 km^{2} (1,158 sq mi)

Population (2017)
  - Total: 974,900
  - Density: 325.2/km^{2} (842.2/sq mi)
- Time zone: UTC+8 (China Standard)
- Postal code: 233200
- Website: www.dingyuan.gov.cn

Dingyuan County (simplified Chinese: 定远县; traditional Chinese: 定遠縣; pinyin: Dìngyuǎn Xiàn) is a county of Anhui Province, China. It is under the administration of Chuzhou city.

== History ==
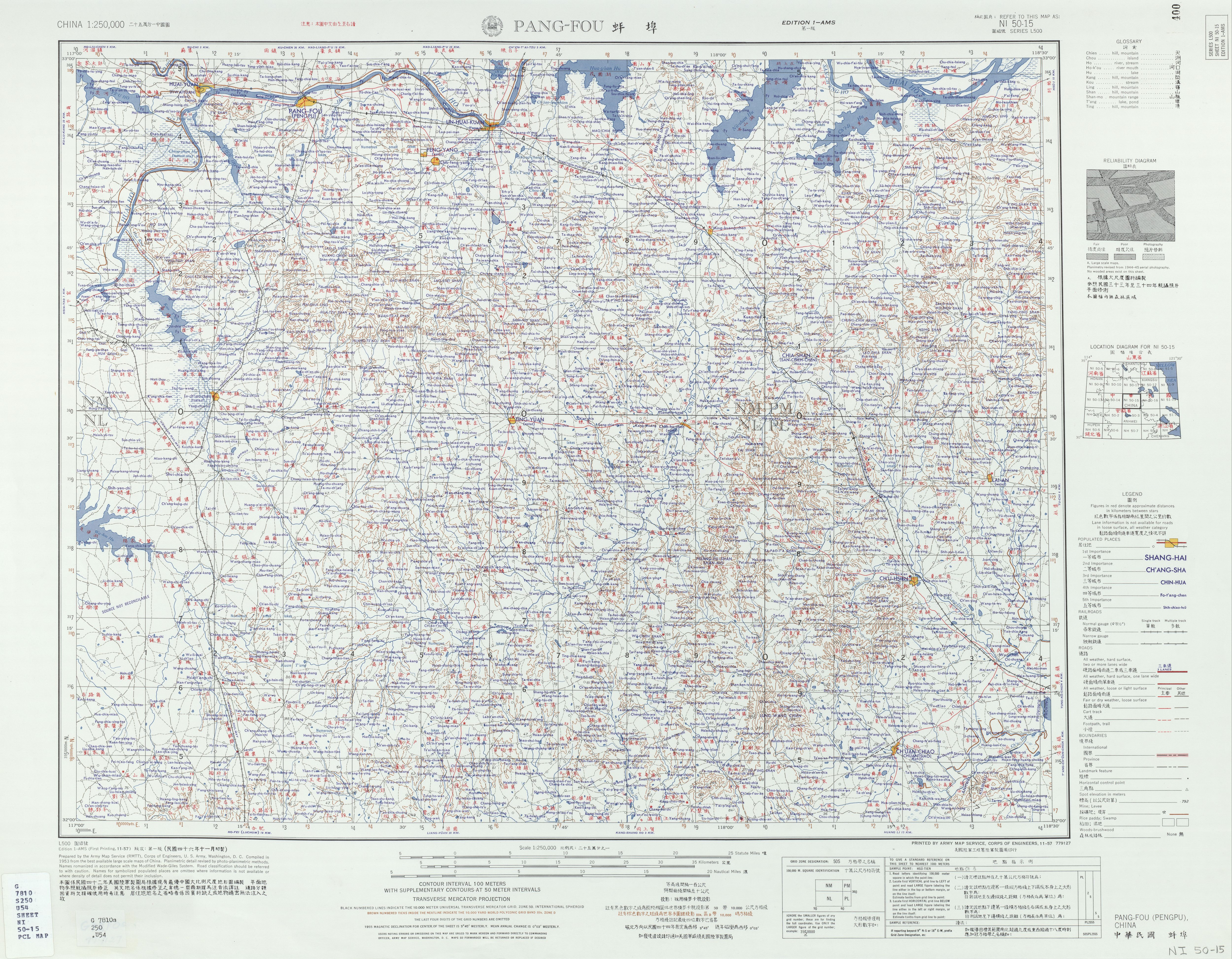
Map including Dingyuan (labeled as TING-YÜAN (walled) 定遠) area (1953)

The ancestral home of Li Keqiang, the former Premier of the People's Republic of China, was Dingyuan.

Human activity in Dingyuan County dates back to the Neolithic period, as shown by the Shaojia site in Guanshan Township and the Houjiazhai site in Qilitang Township. During the Spring and Autumn and Warring States periods, the area around Dingyuan County was part of the state of Chu. After the Qin dynasty unified the six states, Yinling and Dongcheng counties were established in what is now Dingyuan, both under the administration of Jiujiang County.

In the Western Han dynasty, the state of Quyang Hou was added to the present-day Dingyuan region, with the three administrative divisions still under Jiujiang's jurisdiction. During the Wang Mang period, the names of Dongcheng, Yinling, and Quyang Houguo were briefly changed. In the Eastern Han dynasty, the original names from the Western Han period were restored, and Quyang Houguo was renamed West Quyang County. In 72 AD, during the fifteenth year of the Yongping reign, Dongcheng County was transferred to Xiapi, Xuzhou's jurisdiction. In 172 AD here was born magnificent statesman Lu Su; chief-commander of Sun Wu. The counties of Dongcheng and Yinling were abolished during the Three Kingdoms Wei period but later reestablished under Huainan County in the Western Jin dynasty. The Eastern Jin dynasty continued the administrative structure of the Western Jin.

Frequent wars during the Southern and Northern Dynasties led to constant changes in control over the area of present-day Dingyuan County. Initially under the Liu Song dynasty, Dongcheng County was later occupied by the Northern Wei. During the Southern Qi period, Machu County was added to the present Dingyuan region. In 504 AD, Dongcheng County was renamed "Dingyuan," first as a county and later downgraded. The name “Dingyuan” symbolized stabilizing borders and reclaiming distant lands. The area was later recaptured by the Northern Wei in 510 AD, and An Prefecture was established. In 524 AD, General Cao Shizong of Dingyuan merged the counties of Xiquyang, Yinling, and Dongcheng into Dingyuan County. In 540 AD, Southern Liang established Anzhou here, overseeing Dingyuan and Linhao counties. Following Northern Wei's capture, the area was briefly named Xipei County before being returned to the South during the Chen dynasty in 573 AD. In 580 AD, the Northern Qi took control and established Guang'an County, which was later administered by the Sui dynasty.

Under the Sui dynasty, Guang'an County was renamed Linhao County, with its seat in former Dongcheng County. In the Tang dynasty, Linhao County became Dingyuan County. In 745 AD, during the fourth year of the Tianbao reign, Dingyuan County relocated its seat to Dingcheng, where it has remained since. During the Five dynasties and Ten Kingdoms period, the area was under the jurisdiction of the Southern Tang and Later Zhou dynasties. Throughout the Song-Jin wars, control of the region shifted frequently, but it ultimately remained under Southern Song authority. Despite frequent changes in governance until the Republic of China period, the establishment of Dingyuan County remained consistent.

On January 18, 1949, Dingyuan was fell under Chu County Prefecture before being merged with Bengbu Prefecture. In 1961, it returned to Chu County Prefecture, the predecessor of present-day Chuzhou City.

== Administrative Divisions ==
Dingyuan County is divided into 16 towns, 5 townships, 1 ethnic township and 3 others.

16 Towns

- Dingcheng (定城镇)
- Luqiao (炉桥镇)
- Zhangqiao (张桥镇)
- Chihe (池河镇)
- Jiangji (蒋集镇)
- Zhuwan (朱湾镇)
- Lianjiang (连江镇)
- Cang (仓镇)
- Jiepaiji (界牌集镇)
- Xisadian (西卅店镇)
- Yongkang (永康镇)
- Sangjian (桑涧镇)
- Sanheji (三和集镇)
- Outang (藕塘镇)
- Daqiao (大桥镇)
- Wuxu (吴圩镇)

5 Townships

- Qilitang (七里塘乡)
- Nengren (能仁乡)
- Fangang (范岗乡)
- Yanqiao (严桥乡)
- Fuxiao (拂晓乡)

1 Ethnic Township

- Hui Erlong (二龙回族乡)

3 Others

- Dingyuan Economic and Technological Development Zone (安徽定远经济开发区)
- Dingyuan Salt Chemical Industrial Park (定远盐化工业园)
- Lingjiahu Farm (凌家湖农场)

== Climate ==
Climate data for Dingyuan, elevation 70 m (230 ft), (1991–2020 normals, extremes 1981–present)
Month	Jan	Feb	Mar	Apr	May	Jun	Jul	Aug	Sep	Oct	Nov	Dec	Year
Record high °C (°F)	19.8 (67.6)	26.3 (79.3)	33.0 (91.4)	33.1 (91.6)	36.6 (97.9)	37.4 (99.3)	39.6 (103.3)	39.1 (102.4)	38.4 (101.1)	33.6 (92.5)	28.6 (83.5)	22.1 (71.8)	39.6 (103.3)
Mean daily maximum °C (°F)	6.5 (43.7)	9.4 (48.9)	14.7 (58.5)	21.3 (70.3)	26.5 (79.7)	29.5 (85.1)	31.8 (89.2)	31.2 (88.2)	27.4 (81.3)	22.4 (72.3)	15.8 (60.4)	9.0 (48.2)	20.5 (68.8)
Daily mean °C (°F)	2.1 (35.8)	4.8 (40.6)	9.6 (49.3)	16.0 (60.8)	21.4 (70.5)	25.1 (77.2)	27.9 (82.2)	27.1 (80.8)	22.8 (73.0)	17.2 (63.0)	10.6 (51.1)	4.3 (39.7)	15.7 (60.3)
Mean daily minimum °C (°F)	−1.2 (29.8)	1.1 (34.0)	5.5 (41.9)	11.4 (52.5)	16.9 (62.4)	21.3 (70.3)	24.7 (76.5)	23.9 (75.0)	19.2 (66.6)	13.1 (55.6)	6.6 (43.9)	0.8 (33.4)	11.9 (53.5)
Record low °C (°F)	−13.0 (8.6)	−11.8 (10.8)	−4.8 (23.4)	0.0 (32.0)	6.7 (44.1)	11.7 (53.1)	18.0 (64.4)	15.3 (59.5)	10.5 (50.9)	1.2 (34.2)	−6.0 (21.2)	−14.5 (5.9)	−14.5 (5.9)
Average precipitation mm (inches)	37.3 (1.47)	40.5 (1.59)	67.8 (2.67)	67.1 (2.64)	83.8 (3.30)	160.4 (6.31)	179.3 (7.06)	145.6 (5.73)	73.1 (2.88)	50.7 (2.00)	46.6 (1.83)	26.3 (1.04)	978.5 (38.52)
Average precipitation days (≥ 0.1 mm)	7.4	8.5	9.0	8.3	9.1	9.6	11.1	11.8	7.7	7.3	7.7	6.2	103.7
Average snowy days	4.7	3.0	1.3	0.1	0	0	0	0	0	0	0.6	1.7	11.4
Average relative humidity (%)	73	73	71	70	70	76	81	82	78	73	73	72	74
Mean monthly sunshine hours	127.4	126.9	162.5	189.4	199.7	171.9	193.4	191.6	167.1	165.4	149.5	141.0	1,985.8
Percentage possible sunshine	40	40	44	48	46	40	45	47	46	47	48	45	45
Source: China Meteorological Administration
