= Wuwei, Dingyuan =

Wuwei 吴圩镇
- Town
- Location in China
- Coordinates: 32°22′23″N 117°27′53″E
- Country: People's Republic of China
- Province: Anhui
- Prefecture-level city: Chuzhou
- County: Dingyuan County
- Time zone: UTC+8 (China Standard)

Wuwei (simplified Chinese: 吴圩; traditional Chinese: 吳圩; pinyin: Wúwéi) is a town in Dingyuan County, Anhui. As of 2020, it administers one residential community and the following twenty villages:

- Wuwei Village
- Beiji Village (北集村)
- Xikong Village (西孔村)
- Gengxiang Village (耿巷村)
- Dawei Village (大魏村)
- Chenji Village (陈集村)
- Shangli Village (上李村)
- Zhangang Village (站岗村)
- Guantang Village (官塘村)
- Nanzhou Village (南周村)
- Qigang Village (齐岗村)
- Yanshou Village (延寿村)
- Dahu Village (大户村)
- Xuangang Village (宣岗村)
- Shanliu Village (山刘村)
- Jiuzi Village (九梓村)
- Gaogeng Village (高埂村)
- Yangqiao Village (杨桥村)
- Damu Village (大木村)
- Yongxing Village (永兴村)
