= Princess Wuwei (daughter of Juqu Mujian) =

Chinese princess

Princess Wuwei 武威公主
- Born: After 433 AD
- Died: After 447 AD
- Spouse: Gao Qian
- Issue: Gao Chong
- House: Northern Liang
- Father: King Juqu Mujian of Northern Liang
- Mother: Princess Tuoba of Northern Wei

Princess Wuwei (Chinese: 武威公主; pinyin: Wǔwēi gōngzhǔ, after 433–after 447 AD) was a Chinese princess. She was the daughter of Juqu Mujian, the Xiongnu king of the Chinese state of Northern Liang, and of princess Wuwei of Northern Wei.

In 433, Emperor Taiwu of Wei married his younger sister Princess Wuwei (Tuoba) to Juqu Mujian, the king of Northern Liang. In 439, the Northern Liang Dynasty ended, and Juqu Mujian was taken to the Northern Wei Dynasty by Emperor Taiwu. In the eighth year of Taiping Zhenjun (447), Juqu Mujian was accused of planning a rebellion and was executed, and Princess Wuwei's mother Princess Tuoba was remarried to Li Gai, the Duke of Nanjun. After her death, she was buried with Juqu Mujian.

In the early years of Emperor Xianwen, when he returned to the Northern Wei from Koguryo, he gave Gao Qian (Chinese: 高潛; pinyin: Gāo qián) the title of Kaiyang and he settled in Liaodong. Emperor Xianwen married the daughter of Juqu Mujian and Princess Wuwei to Gao Qian, and also gave her the same title as her mother, thus naming her Princess Wuwei. They had a son together, named Gao Chong (Chinese: 高崇; pinyin: Gāo chóng). Princess Wuwei was saddened that her parents' family was extinct, so she changed her surname to Juqu, making Gao Chong adopt the Juqu surname and succeed Juqu Mujian.

== Sources ==
- Wei Shu, Volume 82, Biography 65
