= Gao Chong =

Chinese official

Governor of Luoyang County
- Monarch: Emperor Xiaowen of Northern Wei

Personal details
- Died: c. 527 CE (aged 37)
- Children: Gao Gongzhi, Gao Qianzhi
- Parents: Gao Qian (father); Princess Wuwei (mother)
- Occupation: Official

Gao Chong (Chinese: 高崇; pinyin: Gāo Chóng, died c. 527 AD), courtesy name Jishan (積善), was an official of the Northern Wei dynasty of China. He was from the Bohai Commandery.

== Biography ==
His mother, Princess Wuwei, was the daughter of Juqu Mujian of Northern Liang and of Queen Tuoba of Northern Wei. The direct line of Juqu's family was severed in 447 (the eighth year of Taiping Zhenjun, the fifth era of the reign of Emperor Taiwu of Northern Wei). Gao Chong's mother Princess Wuwei was saddened by this, and he followed her will by becoming the heir of Juqu Mujian, changing his surname to Juqu. Emperor Xiaowen of Wei appointed him Zhongsan, and he was transferred to Sangonglang of Shangshu. In the next year, his surname Gao was restored, he inherited his father's title, and was appointed Chief of the Army, General Fubo (Chinese: 伏波將軍), and Governor of Luoyang County. In the administration of the county, he did not hesitate to expose the influential people, and the government officials and the people feared his majesty. He was about to be promoted by the Imperial court but he died of illness before he could receive the promotion, aged thirty-seven. He was posthumously given the rank of Governor (Taishou) of Yuyang County. In 529 (the second year of Yong'an, the second era of the reign of Emperor Xiaozhuang), he was further presented with the titles of Conqueror General (Chinese: 徵虜將軍) and Provincial Governor (Cishi) of Cangzhou. He also received the Posthumous name of Chéng (Chinese: 成).

== Family ==
Issue:

- Gao Qianzhi (高謙之)
- Gao Gongzhi (高恭之), that is Gao Daomu (高道穆)
- Gao Jinzhi (高謹之), the descendant of the Juqu Clan, who served as the head of the Pingdong House in Cangzhou, died at the age of 35)
- Gao Shenzhi (高慎之), died at the age of 23

== Sources ==
- Wei Shu, Volume 77, Biography 65
- History of the Northern Dynasties, Volume 50, Biography 38
