= Princess Tuoba =

Princess Tuoba, also known by her Northern Wei (386 to 534/535) title Princess Wuwei (武威公主), was the daughter of Emperor Mingyuan of Northern Wei and who later was a princess of the Chinese/Xiongnu state Northern Liang. Her husband was Juqu Mujian (Prince Ai).

It is not known when she was created Princess Wuwei, either by her father or by her brother Emperor Taiwu. In a move to ensure Juqu Mujian's loyalty, Emperor Taiwu married her to Juqu Mujian in 437, forcing Juqu Mujian to divorce his previous wife, Princess Li Jingshou.

However, Juqu Mujian also carried on an affair with his brother's wife, Lady Li, and Lady Li and Juqu Mujian's sisters carried out a plot to poison Princess Tuoba. Emperor Taiwu, hearing that his sister had been poisoned, sent a number of doctors to the Northern Liang capital Guzang (姑臧, in modern Wuwei, Gansu), and they were able to save her. Emperor Taiwu demanded that Lady Li be turned over, but Juqu Mujian refused and sent Lady Li away instead.

In 439, Emperor Taiwu conquered Northern Liang, and took Juqu Mujian as a captive to the Northern Wei capital Pingcheng (平城, in modern Datong, Shanxi), but because of Princess Wuwei's sake, continued to honor Juqu Mujian as a brother-in-law with the title Prince of Hexi. During the marriage, Princess Wuwei bore Juqu Mujian a daughter (Princess Wuwei), but no sons. In 447, Emperor Taiwu suspected Juqu Mujian of planning a rebellion and forced him to commit suicide, but buried him with honors. Princess Wuwei survived her husband, and later after her death was buried with her husband. (Some historical records indicate that she married Li Gai (李蓋) the Duke of Nan Commandery, but these are not conclusive.) Her daughter inherited her title as Princess Wuwei.

== Notes and references ==
- Book of Wei, vol. 99.
- Zizhi Tongjian, vol. 123.

^1 Neither Juqu Wuhui nor Juqu Anzhou, Juqu Mujian's brothers who are sometimes regarded as succeeding princes of Northern Liang, was recorded to have created a princess, although they probably did; their wives' names, however, are lost to history.

Chinese royalty
Preceded by Princess Li Jingshou	Princess of Northern Liang; 437 – 439	None ^{1}
Preceded by Princess Li Jingshou	Princess of China (Central/Western Gansu); 437 – 439	Succeeded by Empress Helian of Northern Wei
