= Juqu Mujian =

Prince Ai of Northern Liang 北涼哀王
- Prince of Hexi

Ruler of Northern Liang
- Reign: 433–439
- Predecessor: Juqu Mengxun
- Successor: Juqu Wuhui (in Gaochang)
- Died: 447
Full name
- Family name: Jǔqú (沮渠); Given name: Mùjiān (牧犍) or Màoqián (茂虔)
Era name and dates
- Yǒnghé (永和): 433–439
Regnal name
- Prince of Hexi (河西王)
Posthumous name
- Prince Āi (哀王, lit. "lamentable")
- House: Juqu
- Dynasty: Northern Liang
- Father: Juqu Mengxun

Juqu Mujian (Chinese: 沮渠牧犍; before 420 – 447), named Juqu Maoqian (沮渠茂虔) in some sources, also known by his posthumous name as the Prince Ai of Northern Liang (北涼哀王), was a prince of the Lushuihu-led Northern Liang dynasty of China. By the time that Juqu Mujian succeeded his father Juqu Mengxun (Prince Wuxuan) in 433, the Northern Liang appeared to be stronger than ever, yet was under the shadow of the much stronger Northern Wei dynasty, to which the Northern Liang was nominally a vassal. In 439, the Emperor Taiwu of Northern Wei launched a major campaign against the Northern Liang and captured both his capital Guzang (姑臧, in modern Wuwei, Gansu) and Juqu Mujian himself. Juqu Mujian remained an honored Northern Wei subject as Emperor Taiwu's brother-in-law until 447, when Emperor Taiwu, believing him to be trying to rebel, forced him to commit suicide. His brother Juqu Wuhui later re-established the Northern Liang dynasty at Gaochang.

== During Juqu Mengxun's reign ==
It is not known when Juqu Mujian was born, nor who his mother was—the historical records seem to indicate that his mother was not Juqu Mengxun's wife Princess Meng, although do not completely preclude that possibility. He was Juqu Mengxun's third son. The first reference to him in history was in 420, after Juqu Mengxun had destroyed rival Western Liang and captured its capital Jiuquan (酒泉, in modern Jiuquan, Gansu), as Juqu Mengxun made him the governor of Jiuquan Commandery and gave him the deceased Western Liang duke Li Xin's Li Jingshou as his wife.

Juqu Mujian was never named heir by his father's will, as his father initially created Juqu Zhengde (沮渠政德), probably his oldest brother, as heir apparent, in 413. After Juqu Zhengde was killed in battle against Rouran forces in 423, Juqu Mengxun created another brother of Juqu Mujian's, Juqu Xingguo (沮渠興國), as heir apparent. After Juqu Xingguo was captured and detained by the Western Qin prince Qifu Mumo in 429, and Juqu Mengxun failed in his attempt to ransom Juqu Xingguo back from Western Qin, he created a younger brother of Juqu Mujian's, said to be of the same mother as Juqu Xingguo's, Juqu Puti (沮渠菩提), as heir apparent. However, as Juqu Mengxun was ill in 433, the nobles and the officials considered Juqu Puti too young to govern, so they deposed Juqu Puti and made Juqu Mujian, who was considered studious and kind, heir apparent instead. Juqu Mengxun soon died, and Juqu Mujian succeeded to the throne. He created his son Juqu Fengtan (沮渠封壇) as heir apparent.

== Reign ==
Juqu Mujian's initial policy was one of careful supplication to the powerful Northern Wei and its Emperor Taiwu, and, as Juqu Mengxun had already agreed to do, he sent his younger sister Princess Xingping to Emperor Taiwu, who created her an imperial consort, and created Juqu Mujian the Prince of Hexi. Juqu Mujian, however, also carefully cultivated relationships with Northern Wei's rivals Liu Song and Rouran, and in 434, after he sent messengers to Liu Song to show submission as well, Emperor Wen of Song also created him the Prince of Hexi.

In 436, after Emperor Taiwu had destroyed Northern Yan and seized its territory, he began to consider conquering Northern Liang. Still, in 437, he sent his sister Princess Wuwei to be married to Juqu Mujian. Juqu Mujian, although he was already married to Princess Li, felt compelled to accept, and Princess Wuwei became his princess. At the same time, Emperor Taiwu also ordered that Juqu Mujian's mother be honored as the Princess Dowager of Hexi. Juqu Mujian was forced to divorce Princess Li, who was exiled to Jiuquan from the Northern Liang capital Guzang (姑臧, in modern Wuwei, Gansu), and died soon thereafter. By Northern Wei demands, Juqu Mujian also sent Juqu Fengtan to the Northern Wei capital Pingcheng (平城, in modern Datong, Shanxi) as a hostage. However, he also continued to send messengers to Liu Song, offering tributes of books while requesting supplies of other books, and Emperor Wen granted them without question. (Note: Despite the marriage, Emperor Taiwu considered launching a campaign against Northern Liang, but at the urging of Li Shun (李順), who had previously advocated military action as well but by this point was against such actions, arguing that the army was still tired from conquering Northern Yan and Xia as well as fighting Liu Song and needed rest, Emperor Taiwu postponed the plans.)

In 439, Juqu Mujian was entangled in a scandal that adversely affected his relationship with Northern Wei. He and his two brothers were all having affairs with the wife of another brother, Lady Li, and Lady Li then plotted, with a sister of Juqu Mujian, to poison Princess Wuwei. Emperor Taiwu sent doctors, who were able to save Princess Wuwei's life, and he then demanded that Juqu Mujian turn over Lady Li. Juqu Mujian refused, and only sent Lady Li to Jiuquan. Meanwhile, the Northern Wei messengers to the Xiyu kingdoms, who were going through Northern Liang frequently, were alleging that Juqu Mujian had informed Xiyu kingdoms that they should not submit to Northern Wei and should submit to Rouran instead. At the encouragement of the prime minister Cui Hao, Emperor Taiwu again prepared military action. With Yuan He, the son of Southern Liang's last prince Tufa Rutan, as guide, he launched a speedy attack and arrived at Guzang quickly. Juqu Mujian, in shock, refused to surrender, defending the city against a siege, while seeking immediate military assistance from Rouran's Chilian Khan, Yujiulü Wuti. Yujiulü Wuti did launch a surprise attack on Pingcheng to try to force Emperor Taiwu to give up the campaign, but after initial successes, he failed to capture Pingcheng, and his brother Yujiulü Qiliegui (郁久閭乞列歸) was captured by Northern Wei forces. After nearly two months of siege, Juqu Mujian's nephew Juqu Wannian (沮渠萬年) surrendered to Northern Wei forces, and Guzang collapsed. Juqu Mujian tied his own arms as sign of submission and surrendered. Emperor Taiwu took the city, but continued to treat Juqu Mujian with respect, as a brother-in-law, and while he took Juqu Mujian to Pingcheng, he continued to allow him to carry the title of Prince of Hexi. (Note: Allegedly, as he surrendered, he opened up the royal treasury to let it be pillaged—an action that would have detrimental consequences to him later on.)

== After capture by Northern Wei ==
While Juqu Mujian's brothers Juqu Wuhui, Juqu Yide (沮渠宜得), and Juqu Anzhou and cousin Juqu Tang'er (沮渠唐兒) would continue to hold out at various Northern Liang cities and later flee and try to establish a permanent present at Gaochang, Juqu Mujian himself appeared to have had no ability to participate in those events. It was around this time that his mother died, and she was buried with honors due a princess dowager.

In 447, however, accusations were made that when Juqu Mujian opened up the royal treasury when Guzang fell, that the treasures ended up back in his possession. Treasures allegedly from the Northern Liang treasury were then found in Juqu Mujian's possession, as were many kinds of poisons and magical items that Juqu Mujian, Juqu Mengxun, and Juqu Mujian's sisters were said to use. In anger, Emperor Taiwu ordered Consort Juqu to commit suicide, and executed many members of the Juqu clan. Later that year, accusations were made that Juqu Mujian was communicating with his former subjects and planning a rebellion. Emperor Taiwu sent Cui Hao to the residence that Juqu Mujian shared with Princess Wuwei, and there forced Juqu Mujian to commit suicide.

== Personal information ==
Consort and issue(s):

- Princess Li, of the Li clan (王后 李氏, divorced 437), personal name Jingshou (敬受)
  - Juqu Fengtan, the Heir Apparent (沮渠封壇), 1st son
- Princess Wuwei, of the Tuoba clan (武威公主 拓跋氏)
  - Princess Wuwei (武威公主), first daughter
    - Married Gao Qian (高潜) and had issue (one son)
  - Third princess
    - Married Sima Jinlon (馬金龍), a son of Sima Chuzhi (司馬楚之) and had issue (one son)
- Unknown
  - Second daughter
    - Married Emperor Wencheng of Northern Wei

== Notes ==
Prince Ai of Hexi House of Juqu Died: 447
Chinese royalty
Preceded by Juqu Mengxun	Prince of Hexi; 433–439	In abeyance Title next held by Juqu Wuhui
Preceded by Juqu Mengxun	Prince of Northern Liang; 433–439	In abeyance Title next held by Juqu Wuhui
Titles in pretence
Preceded by Juqu Mengxun	— TITULAR — Emperor of China; 433–439; Reason for succession failure: Sixteen Kingdoms	Succeeded by Emperor Taiwu of Northern Wei
