= Gaochang (disambiguation) =

Gaochang was an ancient kingdom in modern Turpan, China.

Gaochang may also refer to:

- Gaochang District, the main urban district of Turpan, formerly the county-level city of Turpan
- Gaochang Subdistrict, within Gaochang District
- Qocho, a Uyghur kingdom that succeeded ancient Gaochang
