= Chengping =

Chengping (承平) was a Chinese era name used by several emperors of China. It may refer to:

- Chengping (443–460), era name used by Juqu Wuhui and Juqu Anzhou of the Northern Liang
- Chengping (452), era name used by Tuoba Yu, emperor of Northern Wei
