= Sanbao =

Sanbao (三寶) may refer to:

- Literally meaning Three Treasures (disambiguation), in various cultural and religious settings
- Ming Dynasty Admiral Zheng He, widely known in Chinese by an alias identical to the Chinese term for the Three Jewels of Buddhism.
- Sanbao Subdistrict, Beipiao, Liaoning
- Sanbao Township, Guangxi, in Tian'e County
- Sanbao Township, Heilongjiang, in Bin County
- Sanbao Township, Liaoning, in Beipiao
- Samboo (三寶 or 三保), a Qing dynasty official
- Sanbao is a common mistaken pronunciation of Sanbu (三堡), a common place name in northwestern China.
