= Bin County =

Bin County may refer to the following locations in China:

- Bin County, Heilongjiang (宾县), of Harbin, Heilongjiang
- Bin County, Shaanxi (彬县), a former county of Xianyang, Shaanxi, known as Binzhou, a county-level city now
