= Sanbu =

Sanbu may refer to

== China ==
Sānpù or Sānbǔ (both written as 三堡) may refer to,

- Sanpu railway station (三堡站), on the Beijing–Baotou Railway in Beijing
- Sanbu Township, Xinjiang (三堡乡) in Turpan
- Sanbu Township, Jiangsu (三堡乡) in Huai'an District, Huai'an
- Sanbu, Gansu (三堡镇), town in Minle County
- Sanbu, Cenxi (三堡镇), town in Guangxi
- Sanbu, Xuzhou (三堡镇), town in Tongshan District, Xuzhou, Jiangsu
- Sānpù or Sānbǔ are often misspelled as Sānbǎo (三宝), another popular place name in China.

== Japan ==
- Sanbu District (山武郡), Chiba
- Sanbu (山武町), defunct town division in Chiba
