= Li Lanni =

Chinese author and scriptwriter

- 李兰妮
- Born: December 25, 1956; Bin County, Heilongjiang Province, China
- Occupation(s): Author, Scriptwriter

Li Lanni (simplified Chinese: 李兰妮; traditional Chinese: 李蘭妮; born 1956) is a contemporary Chinese author and scriptwriter.

== Biography ==
=== Literary career ===
A native of Bin County, Heilongjiang, Li attended Nanjing University, graduating from its writers class in 1989.

Prior to her graduation, Li's first published work was released in 1981. In the same year, she received the Guangdong Province New Writers Award. She joined the Chinese Writer's association in 1990. Li's writing has been praised for exploring and highlighting difficult and important topics; such as mental health struggles; and the everyday problems that people face in a modernised China.

Her literary career has been decorated by awards, such as the aforementioned Guangdong Province New Writers Award, as well as the Guangdong Luxun Award for Literature and Art, Guangdong First Qin Mu Prose Award, China Television Feitian Award, "Five One" Project Award from the Central Propaganda Department, the Zhuang Chongwen Literature Award, and the Guangdong Provincial Excellent Title of Young Artist. Her 2019 memoir, A Crowded Silence, was selected by the China News Publication Bureau to be part of the International Publications of Chinese Classics Project.

=== Scriptwriting career ===
Li has also written award-winning scripts for films and TV dramas, such as the Flying Award-winning series 傍海人家 (People by the Sea), produced by the China TV Production Centre in 1998. Li's most decorated series was the 27 episode 澳门的故事 (The Story of Macau), broadcast in 1999, which won the Excellent Feature TV Series Award, the Flying Award and the "Five One" Project Award. She also wrote the script for the film 澳门儿女 (The Children of Macau), produced by Fujian Film Studio.

=== Personal life ===
Li has suffered well documented troubles with both her physical and mental health throughout her life. She was first diagnosed with thyroid cancer in 1988, enduring 3 operations and 5 sessions of chemotherapy. Concurrently, she experienced intense bouts of depression, which began in 1986. She would later relapse in 2003. Her book, "No Man in the Wilderness—The Mental Archives of a Depressed Patient" documents her experiences during this struggle. The book focuses on what was at the time an oft-neglected aspect of the mental health difficulties experienced by cancer patients on top of the physical issues experienced from the condition.

== Works ==
=== Literary works in Chinese ===
==== Novels ====
- 傍海人家 (1998)

==== Novelette collections ====
- 池塘边的绿房子

==== Prose ====
- 一份缘
- 人在深圳
- 澳门岁月 (1999)
- 雨中凤凰
- 旷野无人 (2008)

==== Documentary literature ====
- 野地 灵光 ： 我 住 精神病院 的 日子 (2021)

=== Translated literary works (English) ===
==== Memoirs ====
- A Crowded Silence (Translated by Tsien Yee Yu) (2019)

=== TV dramas ===
- 深圳 (1996)
- 傍海人家 (1998)
- 澳门的故事 (1999)

=== Film ===
- 澳门儿女
