= Putao =

Putao may refer to:

== China ==
- Putao, Guangxi, a town in Yangshuo County, Guangxi Zhuang Autonomous Region
- Putao, Xinjiang, a town in Turpan, Xinjiang Uyghur Autonomous Region

== Myanmar ==
- Putao District, a district of Kachin State
- Putao Township, in Putao District
- Putao, Myanmar, the capital of Putao District, Kachin State
