= Northern Liang =

Chinese Sixteen Kingdoms state (397–439)

Northern Liang (北涼) 建康 (397–399), 涼 (399–401, 431–433), 張掖 (401–412), 河西 (412–431, 433–441, 442–460), 酒泉 (441–442)
- 397–439 442–460 (in Gaochang)
- Northern Liang and other Asian polities in 400 AD

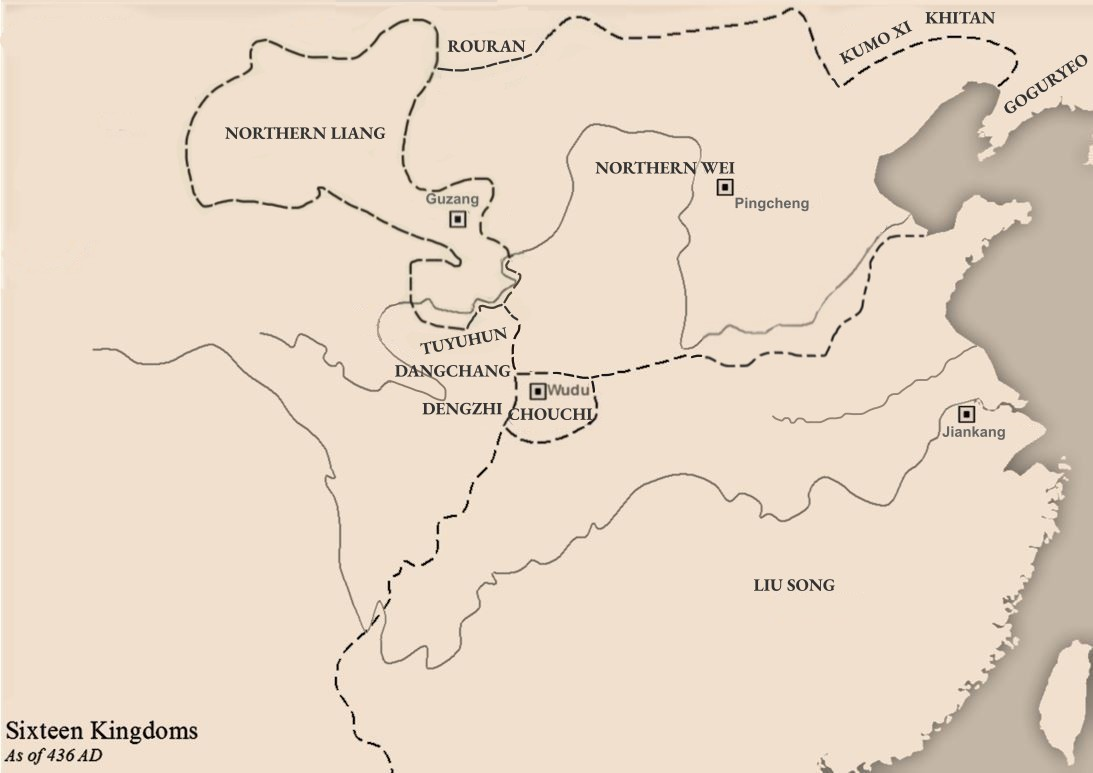
- Northern Liang at its greatest extent in 436 AD
- Status: Vassal of Later Qin, Eastern Jin, Northern Wei, Liu Song
- Capital: Jiankang (397–398); Zhangye (398–412); Guzang (412–439); Jiuquan (440–441); Dunhuang (441–442)
- Capital-in-exile: Shanshan (442); Gaochang (442–460)
- Government: Monarchy
- Prince
  - 397–401: Duan Ye
  - 401–433: Juqu Mengxun
  - 433–439: Juqu Mujian
  - 442–444: Juqu Wuhui
  - 444–460: Juqu Anzhou
Preceded by
Later Liang (Sixteen Kingdoms)
Southern Liang (Sixteen Kingdoms)
Western Qin
Succeeded by
Northern Wei
Gaochang
- Today part of: China; Mongolia

The Northern Liang (Chinese: 北涼; pinyin: Běi Liáng; 397–439) was a dynastic state of China and one of the Sixteen Kingdoms in Chinese history. It was ruled by the Juqu (沮渠) family of Lushuihu ethnicity, though they are sometimes categorized as Xiongnu in some historiographies. Although Duan Ye of Han ethnicity was initially enthroned as the Northern Liang ruler with support from the Juqu clan, Duan was subsequently overthrown in 401 and Juqu Mengxun was proclaimed monarch.

All rulers of the Northern Liang proclaimed themselves "wang" (translatable as either "prince" or "king"). It was also only known as "Liang" (涼) from 399 to 401 and from 431 to 433, as their rulers took on several lesser titles while they were acting as vassals. To distinguish with the other Liang states, they were given the prefix of "Northern" by historiographers as they controlled northern Gansu when they first established. They later went on to rule the entirety of the Hexi Corridor with the key city of Guzang (姑臧, in modern Wuwei, Gansu) as their capital.

After Northern Liang fell, remnants of the Juqu clan fled and occupied the oasis city of Gaochang in 442, where they restored their state as the "Northern Liang of Gaochang" (高昌北涼; Gāochāng Běi Liáng; 442–460).

== History ==
=== Background ===
For most of its existence, the Northern Liang dynasty was ruled by the Juqu house of Lushuihu ethnicity. The Lushuihu, or "Lu River Barbarians" were an ethnic group whose origin is still debated by scholars today. Theories range from them being a branch of the Xiongnu people, to them being descendants of the Lesser Yuezhi that intermingled with the Qiang. The Juqu, in particular, were a Lushuihu tribe based in Linsong Commandery (臨松郡; in modern-day Zhangye, Gansu). Their ancestors once served under the Xiongnu empire under the title of "Juqu" of the Right of Xiongnu (匈奴左沮渠), which they then adopted as their family name. The Juqu eventually submitted to the Han dynasty, and centuries later found themselves serving under the Di-led Later Liang dynasty.

After the Later Liang suffered a heavy defeat to the Western Qin in 397, two members of the Juqu, Juqu Luochou (沮渠羅仇) and Juqu Quzhou (沮渠麴粥) were blamed for the loss and executed. At their funeral, their nephew, Juqu Mengxun riled up the ten thousands in attendant to rebel and avenge their kin. He was defeated early on, but his cousin, Juqu Nancheng, rallied his troops and convinced Duan Ye, the Administrator of Jiankang (建康, in modern Zhangye, Gansu) and a Han Chinese, to lead their rebellion.

=== Reign of Duan Ye ===
Duan Ye took the imperial title of Duke of Jiankang and changed the era name, although real power was shared between him, Juqu Mengxun and Juqu Nancheng. In 398, Mengxun took several commanderies before capturing Zhangye, effectively controlling the western parts of Later Liang. Duan Ye shifted the capital to Zhangye, and in 399, he elevated himself to King of Liang. To distinguish from the other Liang states at the time, historiographers refer to his state as Northern Liang.

However, in 400, the Administrator of Dunhuang, Li Gao rebelled in his commandery and established the Western Liang, taking over the westernmost region and attracting the local Han Chinese. Tension also arose between Mengxun, Nancheng and Duan Ye. In 401, Mengxun manoeuvred into killing Nancheng and Duan Ye, seizing power for himself.

=== Reign of Juqu Mengxun ===
Juqu Mengxun claimed the title of Duke of Zhangye. With the Western Liang breaking away, the Northern Liang was weaker than it was before and had to rely on careful diplomacy with their neighbours. Initially, Mengxun allied with the Southern Liang to destroy Later Liang, achieving so in 403. He then declared himself a vassal of the Later Qin and began clashing with Southern Liang and Western Liang. He repelled several attacks by Southern Liang, and in 410, even besieged their capital Guzang (姑臧, in modern Wuwei, Gansu) but without success. The inhabitants of Guzang later surrendered to him in 411, and in 412, he made the city his new capital, where he elevated himself to the King of Hexi.

Northern Liang continued to place pressure on Southern Liang before they fell to Western Qin in 414. Their demise placed Northern Liang in contact with Qin, sparking a new conflict between them. In 417, taking advantage of Li Gao's death, he went on the offensive against Western Liang. By 421, he captured their capital, Jiuquan and destroyed their last pocket of resistance in Dunhuang, ending the Western Liang. Thus, the Northern Liang became the sole power in the Hexi Corridor and began trading with the Western Regions.

With their western frontier secured, Northern Liang now concentrated their resources on the Western Qin. They allied themselves with the Helian Xia in the Guanzhong and launched a series of attacks on Qin, gradually weakening them. Previously, Northern Liang had submitted to the Eastern Jin in the south vassal, and they continued to send tribute to their successor, the Liu Song, who affirmed Mengxun's imperial title in 423. However, in 431, both Western Qin and Xia fell, and Northern Liang was now in direct contact with the powerful Northern Wei dynasty. As a result, Mengxun decided to become a vassal to Wei, who bestowed him the title of King of Liang.

=== Reign of Juqu Mujian ===
Juqu Mengxun grew deathly ill in 433, and as he was dying, his officials considered his heir apparent, Juqu Puti (沮渠菩提) as being too young to lead and supported another son, Juqu Mujian to the throne. At this point, the Northern Wei was on the verge of unifying northern China. After succeeding his father, Mujian was compelled into entering a marriage alliance with Wei, sending his sister Princess Xingping to marry Emperor Taiwu of Northern Wei while he married Taiwu's sister, Princess Wuwei, and Wei granted him the title of King of Hexi. Meanwhile, he was also a vassal to the Liu Song, who he engaged with in cultural exchange by trading literature works from their respective territories.

Despite their alliance, Emperor Taiwu was determined to complete his unification. In 439, alleging that Mujian was planning to rebel, the Northern Wei launched a campaign against Northern Liang and placed Guzang under siege. Mujian surrendered himself to Wei, thus ending the Northern Liang. The Northern Liang was the last of the so-called Sixteen Kingdoms, and their fall in 439 marked a formal end to the period.

=== Northern Liang of Gaochang (442-460) ===
Juqu Mujian was initially treated with respect in Wei, but by 452, he and his family members in Wei were all put to death under suspicion of plotting to rebel. While he was in Wei, Juqu Wuhui and Juqu Anzhou, continued to hold out in the far northwest and attempted to revive their state in their former territory, but eventually fled and occupied the oasis city of Gaochang in 442. In historiography, their state is known as the "Northern Liang of Gaochang". In 444, Juqu Wuhui submitted to the Liu Song and received the title of King of Hexi. He died shortly after and was succeeded by Juqu Anzhou. Anzhou destroyed the Jushi Kingdom in 450 and attempted to maintain friendly relations with the Rouran Khaganate. However, in 460, the Rouran conquered Gaochang and slaughtered the remnants of the Juqu family.

== Buddhist cave sites and art ==
The Juqu were strong propagators of Buddhism, and it was during the Northern Liang that the first Buddhist cave shrine sites appear in Gansu Province. The two most famous cave sites are Tiantishan ("Celestial Ladder Mountain"), which was south of the Northern Liang capital at Yongcheng, and Wenshushan ("Manjusri's Mountain"), halfway between Yongcheng and Dunhuang. Maijishan lies more or less on a main route connecting China proper and Central Asia (approximately 150 miles (240 km) west of modern Xi'an), just south of the Weihe (Wei River). It had the additional advantage of located not too distant from a main route that also ran N-S to Chengdu and the Indian subcontinent. The Northern Liang also built and decorated the first decorated Mogao Caves (caves 268, 272 and 275) from 419 to 439 CE until the Northern Wei invasion. They have many common points and were built at the same time as Cave 17 of the Kizil Caves.

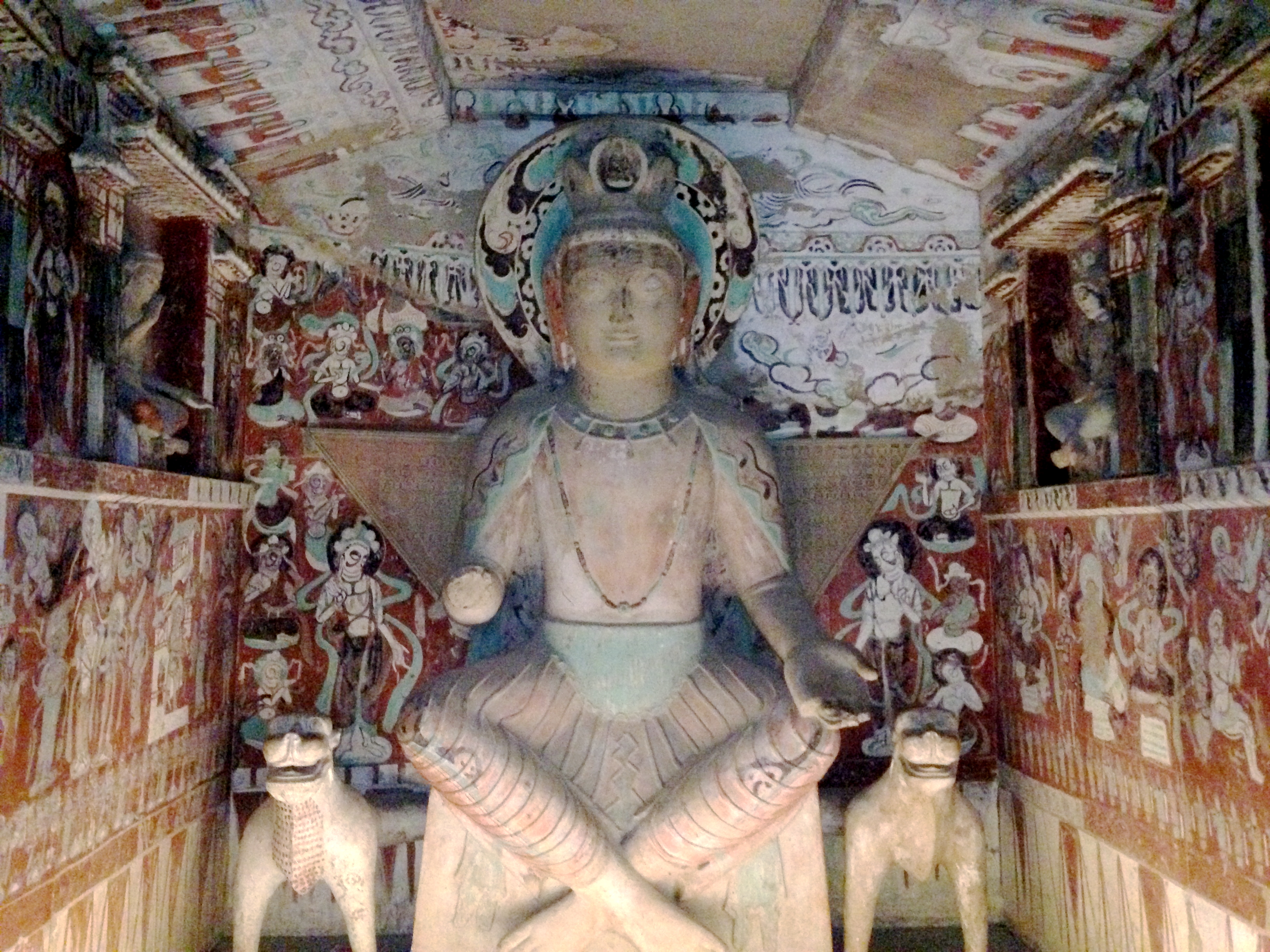
Figure of Maitreya Buddha in cave 275 from Northern Liang

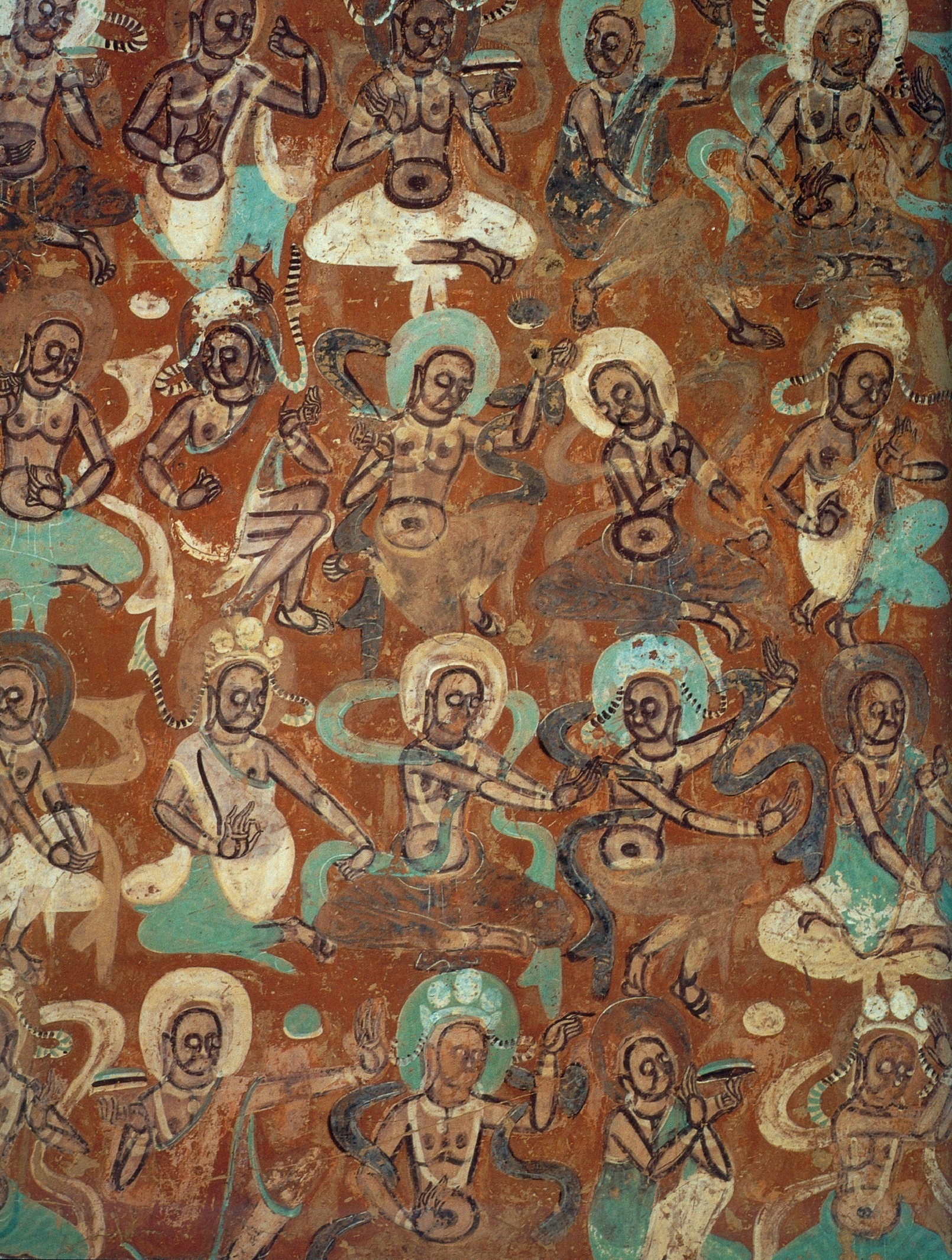
Devas. Dunhuang mural. Cave 272, Northern Liang dynasty

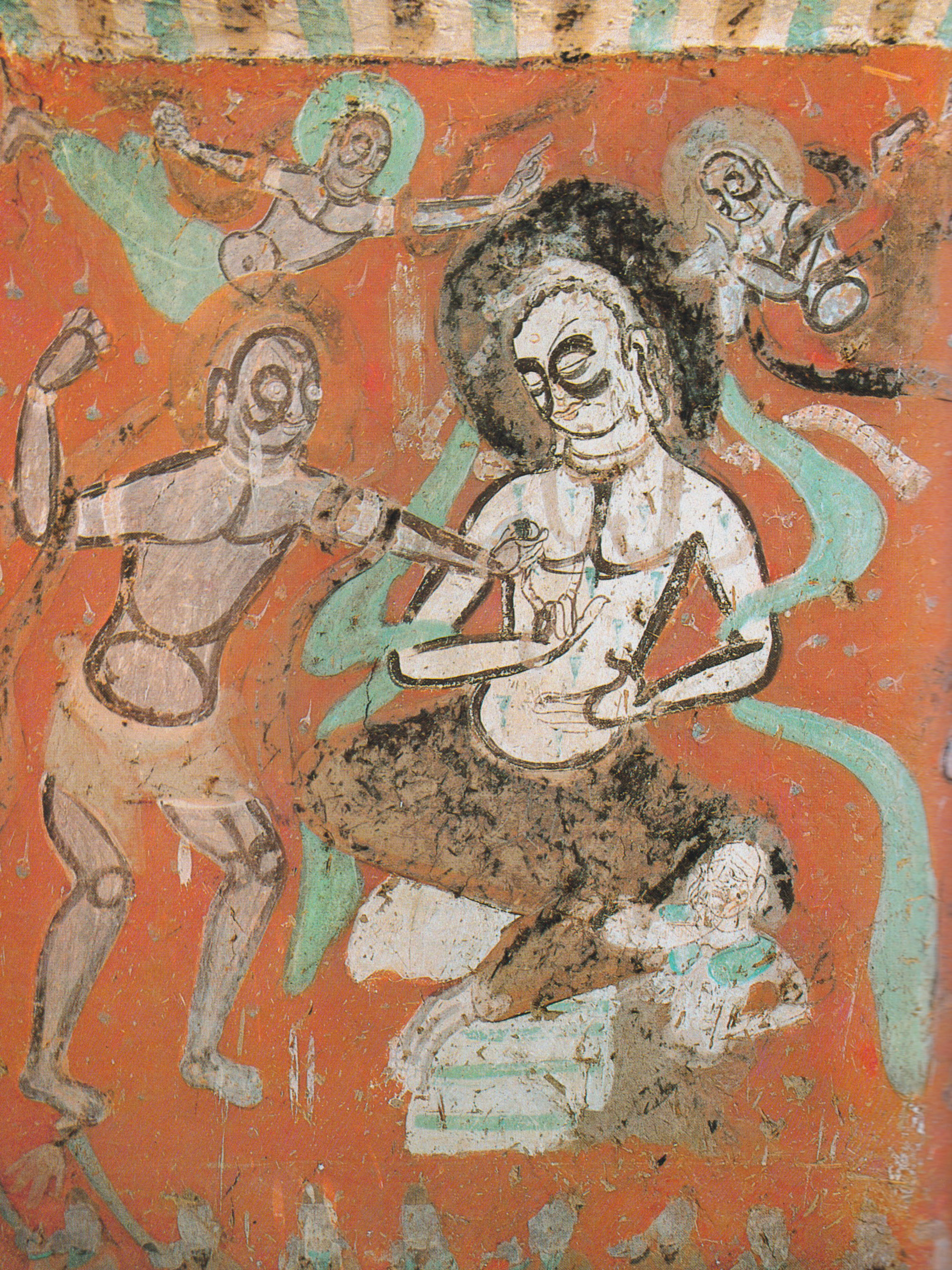
King Bhilanjili Jataka. Mogao cave 275. Northern Liang.

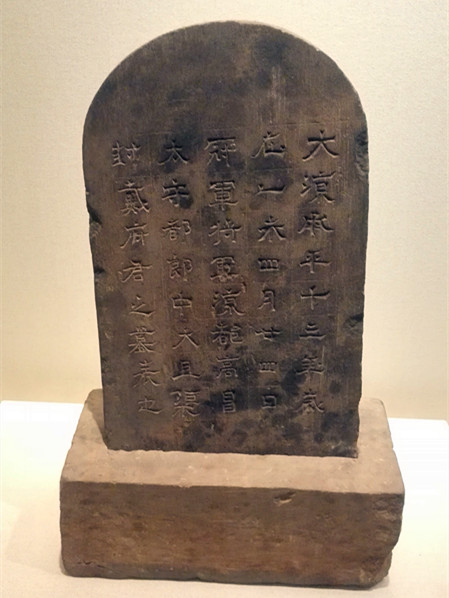
Epitaph of Juqu Fengdai (沮渠封戴, ?—455), Prefect of Gaochang (高昌太守) under the Northern Liang of Gaochang. Excavated in 1972 in the Astana Cemetery

== Rulers of the Northern Liang ==
Temple name	Posthumous name	Personal name	Durations of reign	Era names
Northern Liang (397–439)
–		Duan Ye	397–401	Shenxi (神璽) 397–399 Tianxi (天璽) 399–401
Taizu	Wuxuan	Juqu Mengxun	401–433	Yongan (永安) 401–412 Xuanshi (玄始) 412–428; Chengxuan (承玄) 428–430; Yihe (義和) 430–433
–	Ai	Juqu Mujian	433–439	Yonghe (永和) 433–439
Northern Liang of Gaochang (442–460)
–		Juqu Wuhui	442–444	Chengping (承平) 443–444
–		Juqu Anzhou	444–460	Chengping (承平) 444–460

== Rulers family tree ==
Northern Liang rulers family tree

	Juqu Mengxun 沮渠蒙逊 368–433; Wuxuan 武宣 r. 401–433
Juqu Mujian 沮渠牧犍 bef. 420–d. 447; Ai 哀 r. 433–439	Juqu Wuhui 沮渠無諱 d. 444; r. 442–444	Juqu Anzhou 沮渠安周 d. 460; r. 444–460

== See also ==
- Ethnic groups in Chinese history
- Five Barbarians
- Prince of Hexi
