= Three Treasures =

Three Treasures or Three Jewels (simplified Chinese: 三宝; traditional Chinese: 三寶; pinyin: sānbǎo; Wade–Giles: san-pao) may refer to:

- Three Jewels (Buddhism), Buddha, Dharma and Sangha (Sanskrit: triratna, Pali: tiratana)
  - Triratna, a Buddhist symbol representing the above
- Three Treasures (Taoism), compassion, frugality and humility
- Three Jewels of Jainism, right view, right knowledge and right conduct
- Three Treasures (traditional Chinese medicine), jing, qi and shen
- Three Fried Stuffed Treasures, a dish in Cantonese cuisine
- Three Treasures (Yiguandao), mystic portal, true sutra and hand seal
- Three ancestral treasures, the three items passed down each generation within Chinese culture
- The Silmarils, the three jewels after which The Silmarillion is named
- The Three Treasures, a 1959 Japanese film also known as The Birth of Japan
- A short story collection by Ryūnosuke Akutagawa
- The Three Sacred Treasures (三種の神器, Sanshu no Jingi), or the Imperial Regalia of Japan
- The three Buddhist majority-federal subjects of Russia, Buryatia, Kalmykia and Tuva
- Disanxian (simplified Chinese: 地三鲜; traditional Chinese: 地三鮮), sometimes referred to as "three treasures from the earth", a Chinese dish of potatoes, eggplants, and sweet peppers.
