= Prince of Hexi =

The Prince of Hexi (Chinese: 河西王) was a title used by monarchs of the Northern Liang dynasty of China. The title was first adopted in 412, then affirmed by the Emperor Shao of Liu Song in 423. The princes include:

- Juqu Mengxun, 412–433
- Juqu Mujian, 433–439
- Juqu Wuhui, 442–444
- Juqu Anzhou, 444–460
