= Gaochang, Turpan =

Gaochang: 高昌区 (Chinese); قاراھوجا رايونى (Uyghur); Karahoja, Qarahoja
- District
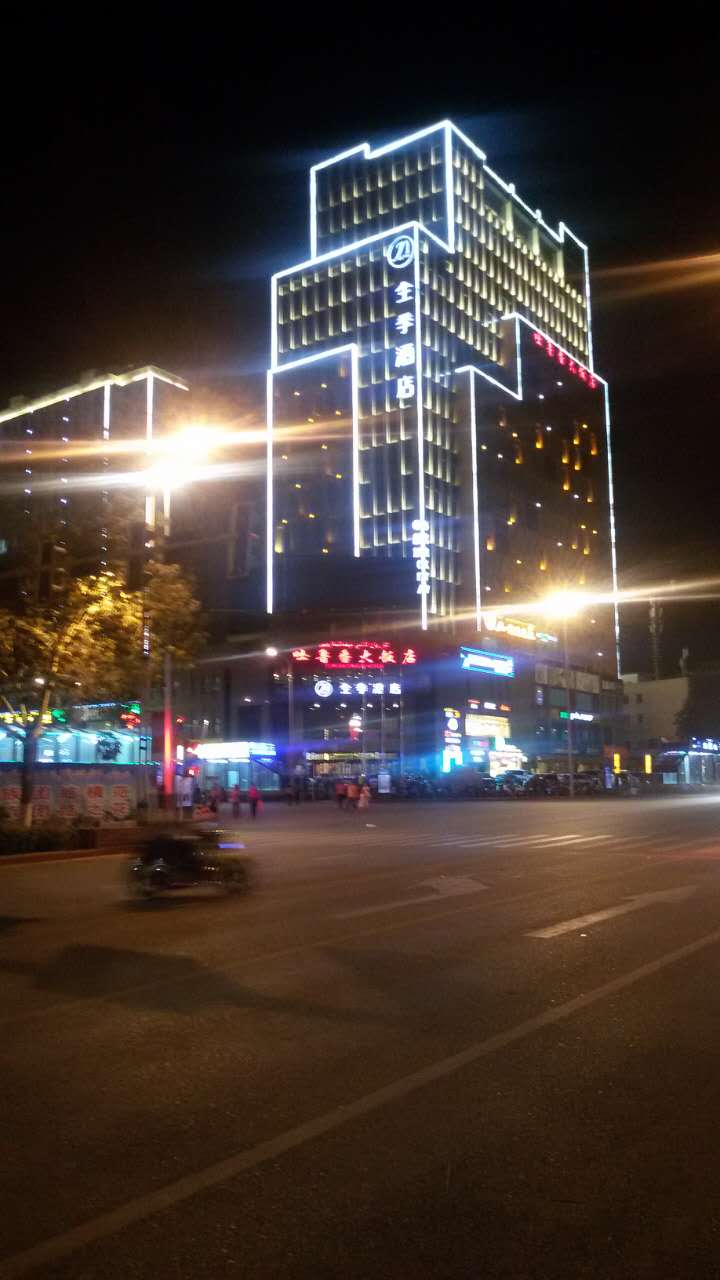
- City center

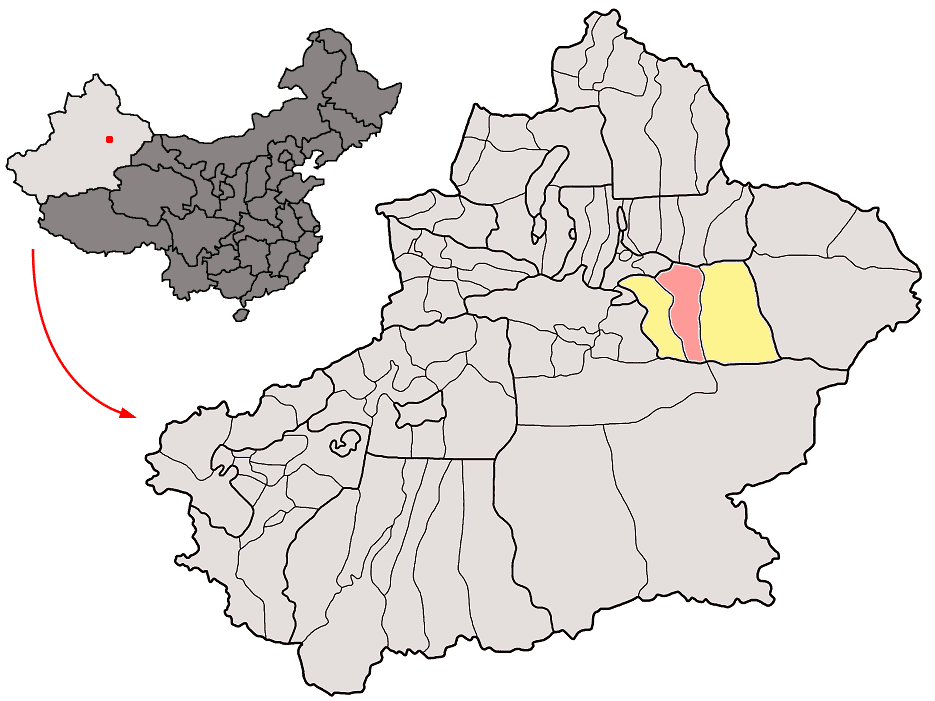
- Location of Karahoja (red) in Turpan Prefecture (yellow) and Xinjiang

- Location of the district centre in Xinjiang Gaochang (China)
- Coordinates (Turpan government): 42°57′04″N 89°11′22″E
- Country: China
- Autonomous region: Xinjiang
- Prefecture-level city: Turpan
- Township-level divisions: 3 subdistricts 2 towns 7 townships
- District seat: Laocheng Road Subdistrict

Area
  - Total: 13,650 km^{2} (5,270 sq mi)

Population (2020)
  - Total: 317,443
  - Density: 23.26/km^{2} (60.23/sq mi)
- Time zone: UTC+8 (China Standard (Note: Locals in Xinjiang frequently observe UTC+6 (Xinjiang Time), 2 hours behind Beijing.))
- Postal code: 838000
- Area code: 0995
- Website: gcq.tlf.gov.cn

Gaochang, Turpan

Chinese name
- Simplified Chinese: 高昌区
- Traditional Chinese: 高昌區
Transcriptions
Standard Mandarin
- Hanyu Pinyin: Gāochāng Qū

Uyghur name
- Uyghur: قاراھوجا رايونى
Transcriptions
- Latin Yëziqi: Qarahoja Rayoni
- Siril Yëziqi: Қарахоҗа Райони

Gaochang or Karahoja (Uyghur: قاراھوجا, romanized: Qarahoja, Қарахоҗа; Chinese: 高昌; pinyin: Gāochāng), is the only district and the seat of the oasis city of Turpan, in the Xinjiang Uyghur Autonomous Region, China. Its population was 254,900 at the end of 2003.

== Name ==
According to the municipal government of Turpan, the district is named after the ancient city of Gaochang. It was also proposed that the district be named after Ayding Lake.

== History ==
The district was created on 12 April 2015 after Turpan was upgraded from a county-level city into a prefecture-level city. The district has the same size and population as the former Turpan county-level city.

== Demographics ==
The proportion of nationalities in Gaochang District County
Nationality	Percentage
Uyghurs	77.4%
Han People	15.7%
Hui People	6.6%
Others	0.3%
Source of the population statistics:

== Subdivisions ==
Gaochang District is divided into 4 subdistricts, 5 towns, 3 townships and 1 other township-level division.

Name	Simplified Chinese	Hanyu Pinyin	Uyghur (UEY)	Uyghur Latin (ULY)	Administrative division code
Subdistricts
Laocheng Subdistrict	老城街道	Lǎochéng Jiēdào	كونا شەھەر كوچا باشقارمىسى	Kona sheher kocha bashqarmisi	650402001
Gaochang Subdistrict	高昌街道	Gāochāng Jiēdào	قاراھوجا كوچا باشقارمىسى	Qarahoja kocha bashqarmisi	650402002
Putaogou Subdistrict	葡萄沟街道	Pútáogōu Jiēdào	بۇيلۇق كوچا باشقارمىسى	Buyluq kocha bashqarmisi	650402003
Hongliuhe Subdistrict	红柳河街道	Hóngliǔhé Jiēdào	يۇلغۇن ئېغىن كوچا باشقارمىسى	Yulghun ëghin kocha bashqarmisi	650402004
Towns
Qiquanhu Town	七泉湖镇	Qīquánhú Zhèn	چىچان بازىرى	Chichan baziri	650402100
Daheyan Town	大河沿镇	Dàhéyán Zhèn	داخىيەن بازىرى	Daxiyen baziri	650402101
Yar Town	亚尔镇	Yà'ěr Zhèn	يار بازىرى	Yar baziri	650402102
Aydingköl Town (Aidinghu Town)	艾丁湖镇	Àidīnghú Zhèn	ئايدىڭكۆل بازىرى	Aydingköl baziri	650402103
Ürümchilik Town (Putao Town)	葡萄镇	Pútáo Zhèn	ئۈرۈمچىلىك بازىرى	Ürümchilik baziri	650402104
Yalquntagh Town (Huoyanshan Town)	火焰山镇	Huǒyànshān Zhèn	يالقۇنتاغ بازىرى	Yalquntagh baziri	650402105
Townships
Chatqal Township	恰特喀勒乡	Qiàtèkālè Xiāng	چاتقال يېزىسى	Chatqal yëzisi	650402203
Astane Township (Sanbu Township)	三堡乡	Sānbǔ Xiāng	ئاستانە يېزىسى	Astane yëzisi	650402205
Shengjin Township	胜金乡	Shèngjīn Xiāng	سىڭگىم يېزىسى	Singgim yëzisi	650402206
Township-level division
Turpan Seed Stock Station	原种场	Yuánzhǒngchǎng	ئەسلى ئۇرۇمچىلىق مەيدانى	Esli Urumchiliq meydani	650402401

== Climate ==
Gaochang District has a cold-desert climate (Köppen climate classification Bwk). The average annual temperature in Gaochang is 6.5 °C (43.7 °F). The average annual rainfall is 50.8 mm (2.00 in) with July as the wettest month. The temperatures are highest on average in July, at around 22.8 °C (73.0 °F) and lowest in January, at around −11.5 °C (11.3 °F).

Climate data for Gaochang (Hongliuhe, 1981−2010 normals, extremes 1981−present)
Month	Jan	Feb	Mar	Apr	May	Jun	Jul	Aug	Sep	Oct	Nov	Dec	Year
Record high °C (°F)	12.3 (54.1)	15.6 (60.1)	23.5 (74.3)	28.5 (83.3)	34.4 (93.9)	36.9 (98.4)	40.6 (105.1)	40.6 (105.1)	34.5 (94.1)	26.3 (79.3)	18.3 (64.9)	12.9 (55.2)	40.6 (105.1)
Mean daily maximum °C (°F)	−2.7 (27.1)	2.1 (35.8)	8.8 (47.8)	16.8 (62.2)	23.5 (74.3)	28.2 (82.8)	30.3 (86.5)	28.9 (84.0)	23.6 (74.5)	14.8 (58.6)	5.4 (41.7)	−1.7 (28.9)	14.8 (58.7)
Daily mean °C (°F)	−11.5 (11.3)	−6.8 (19.8)	0.2 (32.4)	8.1 (46.6)	15.3 (59.5)	20.5 (68.9)	22.8 (73.0)	21.1 (70.0)	15.2 (59.4)	6.1 (43.0)	−3.2 (26.2)	−10.0 (14.0)	6.5 (43.7)
Mean daily minimum °C (°F)	−18.1 (−0.6)	−14.1 (6.6)	−7.4 (18.7)	0.1 (32.2)	7.0 (44.6)	12.6 (54.7)	15.4 (59.7)	13.8 (56.8)	7.6 (45.7)	−1.1 (30.0)	−9.8 (14.4)	−15.9 (3.4)	−0.8 (30.5)
Record low °C (°F)	−27.3 (−17.1)	−26.6 (−15.9)	−21.3 (−6.3)	−11.2 (11.8)	−6.4 (20.5)	2.4 (36.3)	5.2 (41.4)	1.0 (33.8)	−1.4 (29.5)	−18.5 (−1.3)	−24.2 (−11.6)	−29.5 (−21.1)	−29.5 (−21.1)
Average precipitation mm (inches)	1.0 (0.04)	1.0 (0.04)	2.2 (0.09)	2.7 (0.11)	4.5 (0.18)	8.9 (0.35)	13.1 (0.52)	9.2 (0.36)	3.3 (0.13)	1.8 (0.07)	1.8 (0.07)	1.3 (0.05)	50.8 (2.01)
Average relative humidity (%)	56	42	31	25	23	28	32	31	28	35	45	56	36
Source: China Meteorological Data Service Center all-time record high
