= Three ancestral treasures =

Three culturally treasured items from a region in China

Three ancestral treasures (三樣寶; sān yàng bǎo, 三宗寶; sān zōng bǎo, or 三寶; sān bǎo) refers to three treasured items coming from a particular region within the culture of China. Each region has its own three treasures passed down from generations.

== List of regional treasures ==
The following is sorted alphabetically by region:

Regions	Items
Baoding	baoding balls (鐵球), flour sauce (面醬), Ardisia squamulosa presl (春不老)
Gansu	Lanzhou hookah (蘭州水煙), Hequ horse (河曲馬), honeydew melon (白蘭瓜)
Guangdong	chenpi (陳皮), aged ginger (老薑), hay (禾稈草)
Lin'an City	tea leaf (茶葉), dried bamboo shoots (筍乾), hickory nut (山核桃)
Northeast China	ginseng (人參), mink fur (貂皮), Carex meyeriana grass (烏拉草)
Qinghai	deer velvet antler (鹿茸), musk (麝香), Cordyceps (冬蟲草)
Tianjin	drum tower (鼓樓), artillery battery (炮臺), small-bell chambers (鈴鐺閣)

== See also ==
- Three Treasures (Taoism)
- Three Treasures (traditional Chinese medicine)
