= Sanbu Township, Xinjiang =

Township in Gaochang District, Xinjiang, China

Sanbu Township (Chinese: 三堡乡; pinyin: Sānbǔ Xiāng; Uyghur: ئاستانە يېزىسى, romanized: Astane Yëzisi) is a township in Gaochang District, Turpan, Xinjiang, China. The ancient Gaochang city ruins is located here.

== Geography ==
Sanbu made international headlines during the 2023 Asia heat wave. The local unmanned weather station set a new record of 52.2 °C (126.0 °F) at 17:00 Xinjiang Time (19:00 Beijing Time), July 16, 2023, breaking the old record of 50.6°C at 18:03 Beijing Time, July 10, 2017. Two days later, on July 18, 2023, John Kerry, the U.S. Special Presidential Envoy for Climate visited Beijing and mentioned the Sanbu weather to Li Qiang, the Premier of China. The English newspaper misspelled Sanbu as Sanbao at the time.
