= Samboo =

Qing dynasty official

Samboo (Manchu: ᠰᠠᠮᠪᠣᠣ, romanized: Samboo; 1718-1784), of the Irgen Gioro clan from Manchu Plain Red Banner, served in Grand Council in Qianlong era.

== Biography ==
Samboo's great-great-grandfather Badai entered the service of Nurhaci during the founding of the Manchu Khanate. Samboo obtained the degree of Manchu-Chinese Translation Jinshi (繙譯進士) in 1739 and was appointed a junior official in the Grand Secretariat. He later served as Salt and Courier Circuit Intendant of Hubei, director in the Ministry of Revenue, and Provincial Treasurer of Zhili, Sichuan, Hubei, Hunan, and Guizhou. He subsequently held the offices of Governors of Shanxi, Zhejiang, Viceroy of Huguang, Grand Secretary of the Eastern Cabinet (東閣大學士) and Minister of Rites, and later Viceroy of Min-Zhe. Although implicated for failing to impeach the corrupt governor Wang Danwang, he was retained in office and later appointed Chief Tutor of the Imperial Study (尙書房總師傅). In 1784, he fell ill while accompanying the Qianlong Emperor to Rehe and died shortly after returning to Beijing. He was posthumously honored with the name Wenjing (文敬, "Cultured and Reverent").

Samboo was known for his integrity and his fondness for the writings of Song dynasty Neo-Confucian scholars. While serving as Provincial Treasurer of Zhili, he accompanied the Qianlong Emperor on a journey to Rehe. When heavy rains caused the river at Miyun to flood, the emperor intended to cross the torrent on horseback. Samboo remonstrated that the "Son of Heaven" (天子) should not expose himself to such danger. When the emperor replied that enduring hardship was an old Manchu tradition, Samboo answered that the emperor was travelling together with the Empress Dowager and asked how she could safely cross the river if he proceeded. Moved by this argument, the emperor abandoned the attempt and turned back. As Chief Tutor of the Imperial Study, Samboo also compiled his own textbook, Chunhua Rilan (春華日覽), which was used in the education of the imperial princes.
