= Putao, Xinjiang =

Putao 葡萄镇
- Town
- Location in Xinjiang
- Coordinates: 42°57′11″N 89°12′10″E
- Country: People's Republic of China
- Autonomous Region: Xinjiang
- Prefecture-level city: Turpan
- District: Gaochang District
- Time zone: UTC+8 (China Standard)

Putao (Chinese: 葡萄) is a town of Gaochang District, Turpan, Xinjiang, China. As of 2020, it has three residential communities and five villages under its administration.
