= Gaochang =

Site of historical ruins in Xinjiang

- 高昌 قۇچۇ
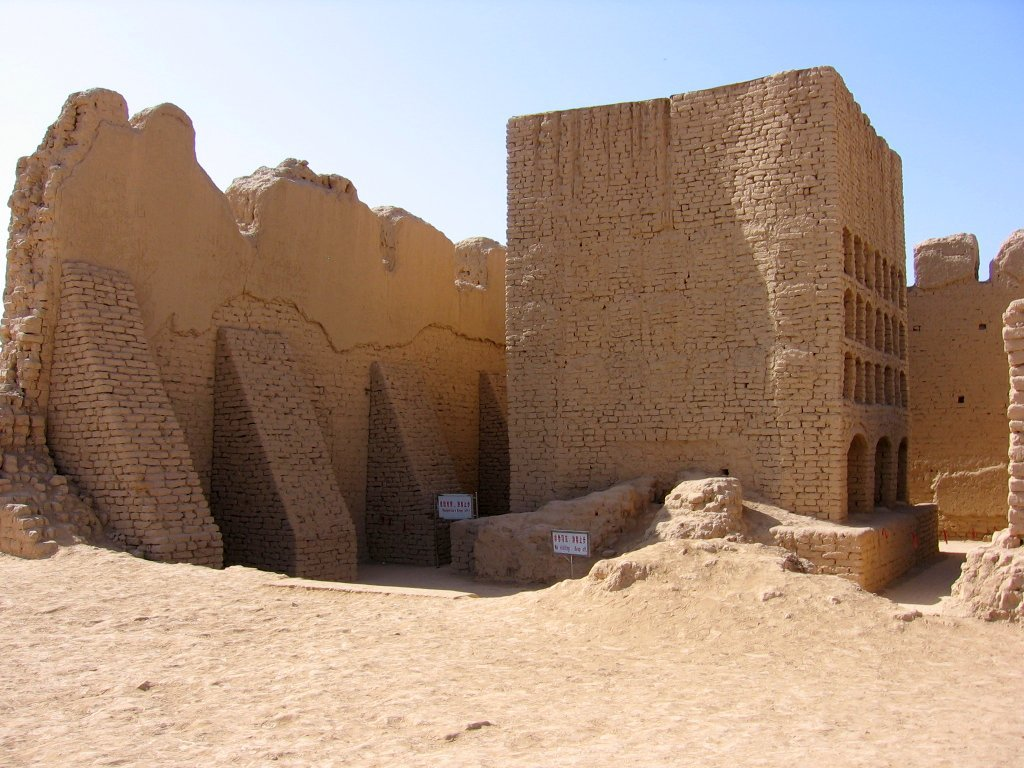
- The Buddhist stupa of Gaochang ruins

- Location within Xinjiang Location within China
- 42°51′10″N 89°31′45″E
- Type: Settlement
- Location: Sanbu Township, Turpan, Xinjiang, China

Site notes
- Condition: In ruins

Gaochang (Chinese: 高昌; pinyin: Gāochāng; Old Uyghur: Qocho), also called Khocho, Karakhoja, Qara-hoja, Kara-Khoja or Karahoja (قاراغوجا in Uyghur), was an ancient oasis city on the northern rim of the inhospitable Taklamakan Desert in present-day Sanbu Township, Xinjiang, China. The site is also known in published reports as Chotscho, Khocho, Qocho or Qočo. During the Yuan dynasty and Ming dynasty, Gaochang was referred to as "Halahezhuo" (哈拉和卓; Qara-khoja) and Huozhou.

A busy trading center, it was a stopping point for merchant traders traveling on the Silk Road. It was destroyed in wars during the 14th century and old palace ruins and inside and outside cities can still be seen today. Along with other sites along the historic Silk Road, Gaocheng was inscribed in 2014 on the UNESCO World Heritage List as the Silk Roads: the Routes Network of Chang'an-Tianshan Corridor World Heritage Site.

Near Gaochang is another major archeological site: the Astana tombs.

== History ==
=== Subeshi culture (1100–100 BCE) ===
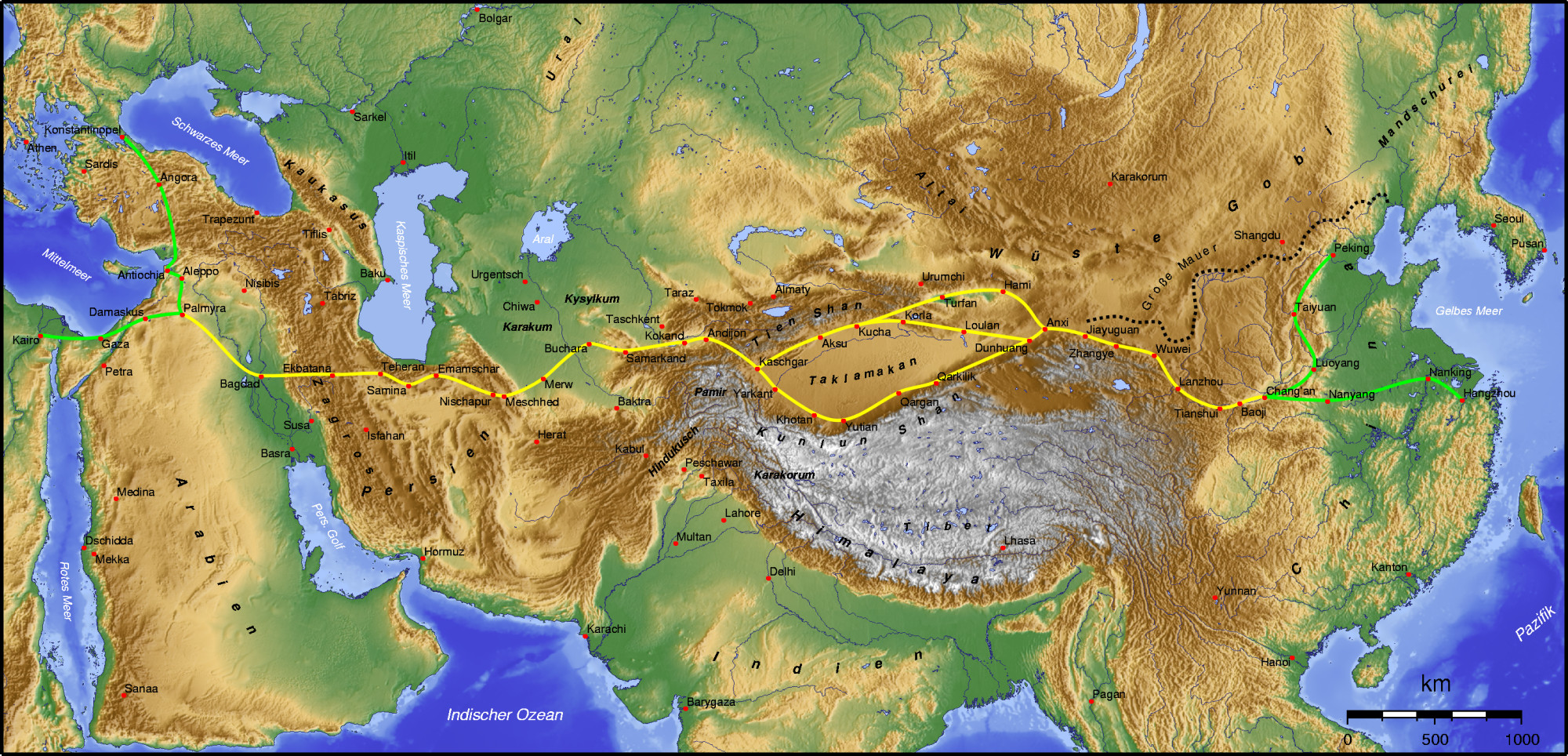
Gaochang's location (close to Turpan) on the Silk Road

One of the earliest cultures of the region was the Iron Age Subeshi culture (1100–100 BCE). The Subeshi culture contributes some of the later period Tarim Mummies. The culture is probably associated with the Cheshi state (車師, Chü-shih, Jushi Kingdom) known from Chinese historical sources. The Subeshi culture is documented by three closely related cemeteries the Subeshi cemetery, the Shengjindian cemetery, and the Yanghai cemetery.

=== Jushi Kingdom and early Han Chinese rule ===
Gaochang was built in the 1st century BC, it was an important site along the Silk Road. It played a key role as a transportation hub in Western China. The region around Turfan was described during the Han dynasty (206 BCE – 220 CE) as being occupied by the Jūshī (Jushi Kingdom), while control over the region swayed between the Han Chinese and the Xiongnu. The Jushi leaders later pledged their allegiance to the Han dynasty.

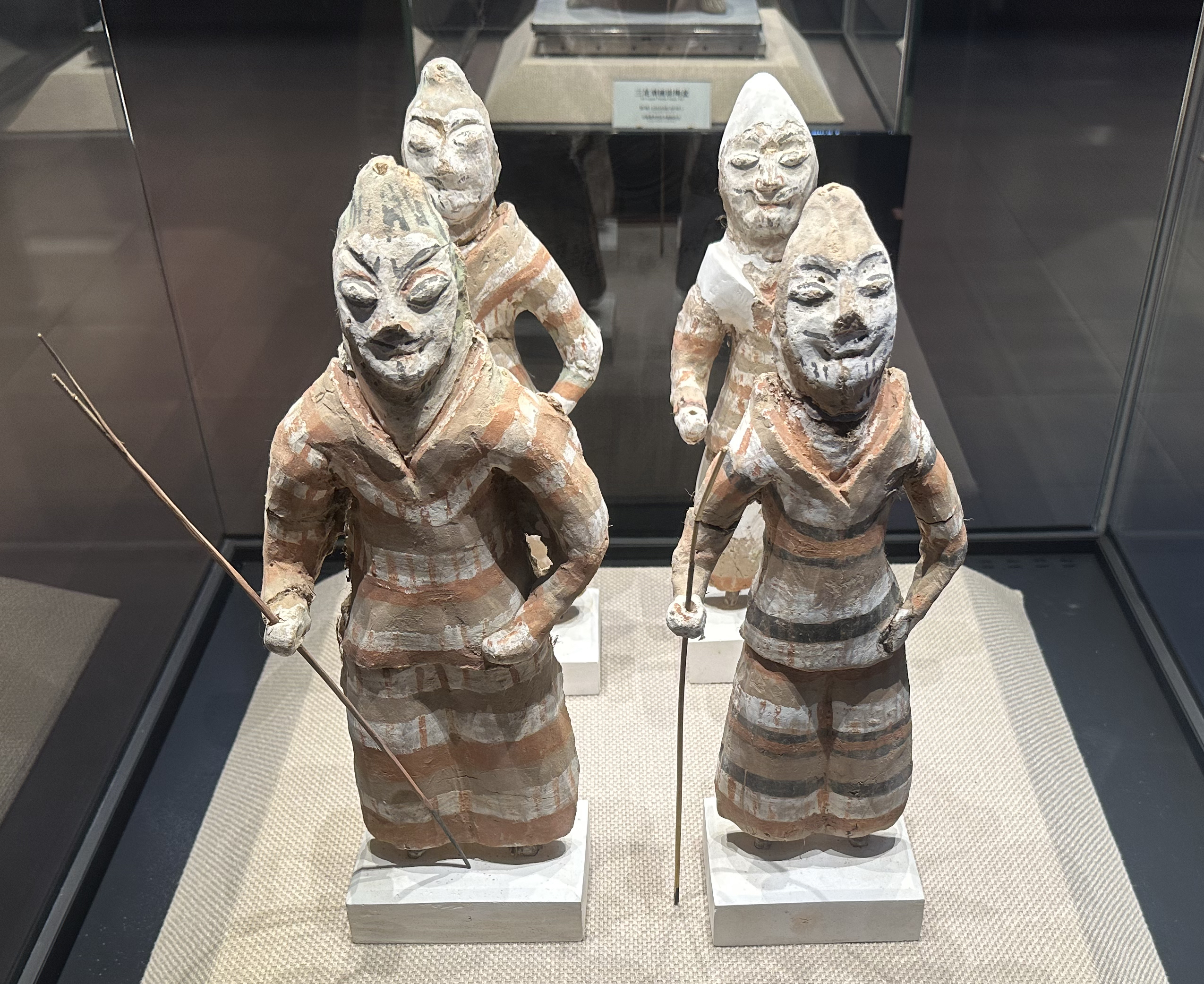
Painted warriors, Yanghai tomb, Gaochang Prefecture period, 327-460 CE

The Chinese set up a military colony/garrison and organized the land into multiple divisions. Han Chinese colonists from the Hexi region and the central plains also settled in the region.

After the fall of the Western Jin dynasty, Northern China split into multiple states, including the Central Asian oases. Gaochang was ruled by the Former Liang, Former Qin and Northern Liang as part of a commandery. In 327, the Gaochang Commandery (jùn) was created by the Former Liang under the Han Chinese ruler Zhang Jun. In 383 the general Lu Guang of the Former Qin seized control of the region.

In 439, remnants of the Northern Liang, led by Juqu Wuhui and Juqu Anzhou, fled to Gaochang where they would hold onto power until 460 when they were conquered by the Rouran Khaganate. Another version of this story says that in 439 a man named Ashina led 500 families from Gansu to Gaochang. In 460, the Rouran forced them to move to the Altai. They became the Ashina clan that formed the Göktürk Khaganate

Six Dynasties Turfan tombs contained dumplings.

=== Gaochang Kingdom ===
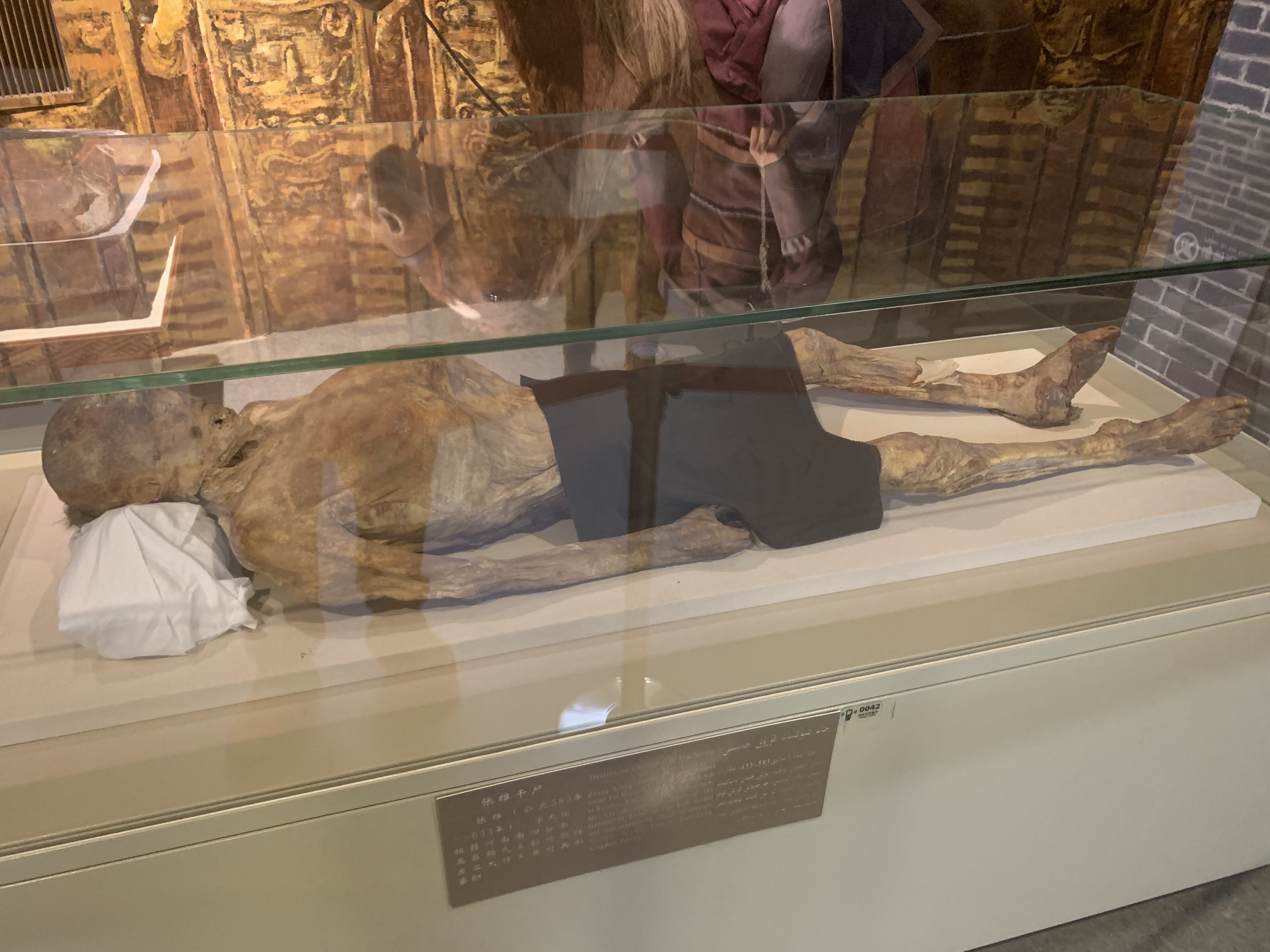
Mummy of the Qushi Kingdom (麹氏王国) general Zhangxiong (583-633 CE, 左卫大将军张雄). Xinjiang Museum

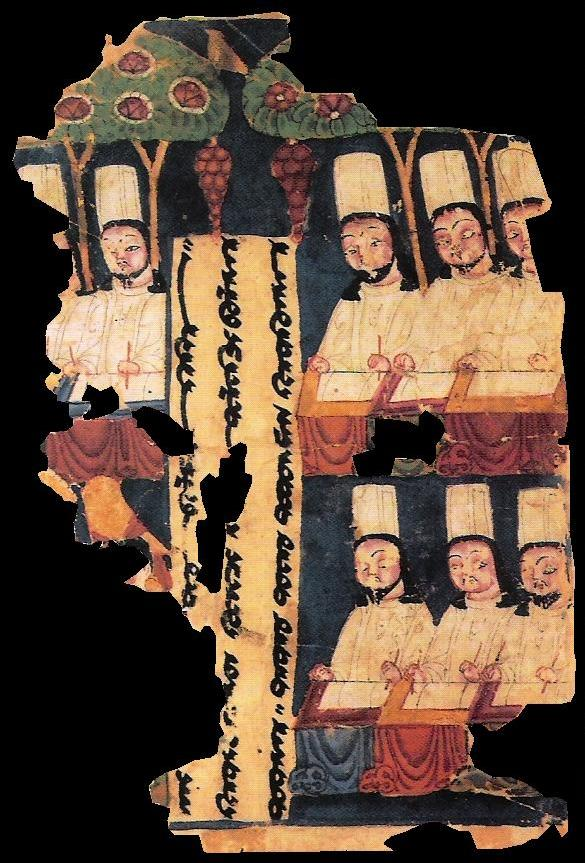
Manichaean priests, writing at their desks. Manuscript from Qocho. 8th/9th century

From the mid-5th century until the mid-7th century, the Gaochang Kingdom was successively controlled by the Kan, Zhang, Ma and Qu clans.

At the time of its conquest by the Rouran Khaganate, there were more than ten thousand Han Chinese households in Gaochang. The Rouran Khaganate, which was based in Mongolia, appointed a Han Chinese named Kan Bozhou to rule as King of Gaochang in 460, and it became a separate vassal kingdom of the Khaganate. Kan was dependent on Rouran backing. Yicheng and Shougui were the last two kings of the Chinese Kan family to rule Gaochang.

At this time the Gaoche (高車) was rising to challenge power of the Rouran in the Tarim Basin. The Gaoche king Afuzhiluo (阿伏至羅) killed King Kan Shougui, who was the nephew of Kan Bozhou. and appointed a Han from Dunhuang, named Zhang Mengming (張孟明), as his own vassal King of Gaochang. Gaochang thus passed under Gaoche rule.

Later, Zhang Mengming was killed in an uprising by the people of Gaochang and replaced by Ma Ru (馬儒). In 501, Ma Ru himself was overthrown and killed, and the people of Gaochang appointed Qu Jia (麴嘉) of Jincheng (in Gansu) as their king, forming the Qushi Kingdom (麹氏王国, 501-640 CE). Qu Jia hailed from the Zhong district of Jincheng commandery (金城, roughly corresponding to modern day Lanzhou, Gansu) Qu Jia at first pledged allegiance to the Rouran, but the Rouran khaghan was soon killed by the Gaoche and he had to submit to Gaoche overlordship. During Qu rule, powerful families established marriage ties with each other and dominated the kingdom, they included the Zhang, Fan, Yin, Ma, Shi and Xin families. Later, when the Göktürks emerged as the supreme power in the region, the Qu dynasty of Gaochang became vassals of the Göktürks.

While the material civilization of Kucha to its west in this period remained chiefly Indo-Iranian in character, in Gaochang it gradually merged into the Tang aesthetics. In 607 the ruler of Gaochang Qu Boya paid tribute to the Sui dynasty, but his attempt at sinicization provoked a coup which overthrew the Qu ruler. The Qu family was restored six years later and the successor Qu Wentai welcomed the Tang pilgrim Xuanzang with great enthusiasm in 629 AD.

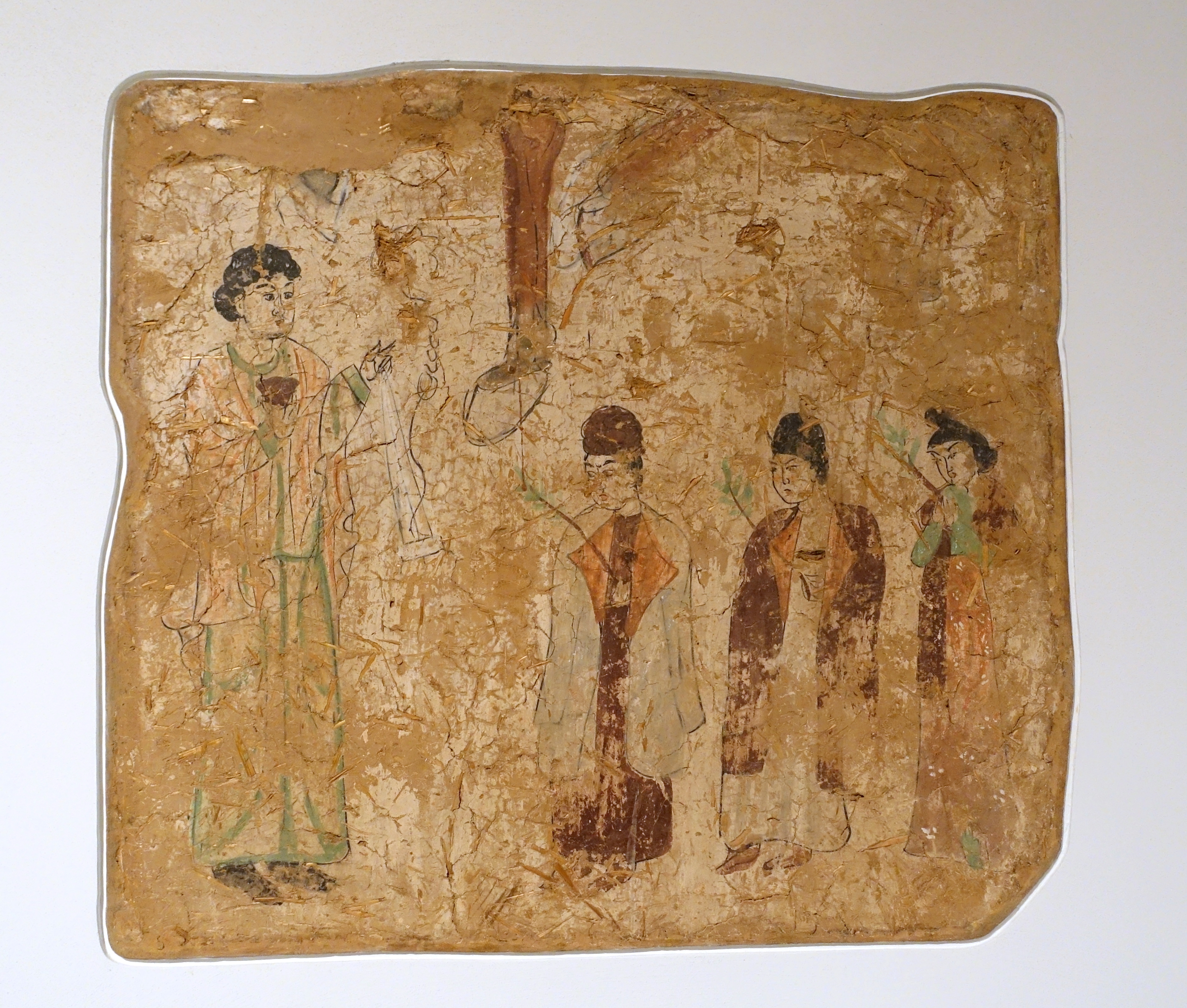
Wall painting from a Christian church, Qocho 683–770 CE

The Kingdom of Gaochang was made out of Han Chinese migrants and ruled by the Han Chinese Qu family which originated from Gansu. Jincheng commandery 金城 (Lanzhou), district of Yuzhong 榆中 was the home of the Qu Jia. The Qu family was linked by marriage alliances to the Turks, with a Turk being the grandmother of King Qu Boya's. During this period, Gaochang's administration, language, city planning, and Confucian society was so heavily dominated by Chinese models that it was known in Sogdian as "Chinatown", a usage which continued as late as the tenth-century Persian geography Ḥudūd al-‘Ālam.

=== Tang rule ===
However, fearing Tang expansion, Qu Wentai later formed an alliance with the Western Turks and rebelled against Tang suzerainty. Emperor Taizong sent an army led by General Hou Junji against the kingdom in 640 and Qu Wentai apparently died of shock at news of the approaching army. Gaochang was annexed by the Chinese Tang dynasty and turned into a sub-prefecture of Xizhou (西州) and the seat of government of Anxi (安西). Before the Chinese conquered Gaochang, it was an impediment to Chinese access to Tarim and Transoxiania.

Gaochang was populated by Han people and Shanxi (Hedong) was the original home of the royal family at the time of the Tang dynasty's annexation. The Tang dynasty accepted arguments at court who said that because Gaochang was Han populated that they needed to annex it.

Under Tang rule, Gaochang was inhabited by Chinese, Sogdians and Tocharians.

7th or 8th century old dumplings and wontons were found in Turfan.

The Tang dynasty became greatly weakened due to the An Lushan Rebellion and in 755, the Chinese were forced to pull back their soldiers from the region. The area was first taken by the Tibetans, then finally by the Uyghurs in 803, who called the area Kocho (Qocho).

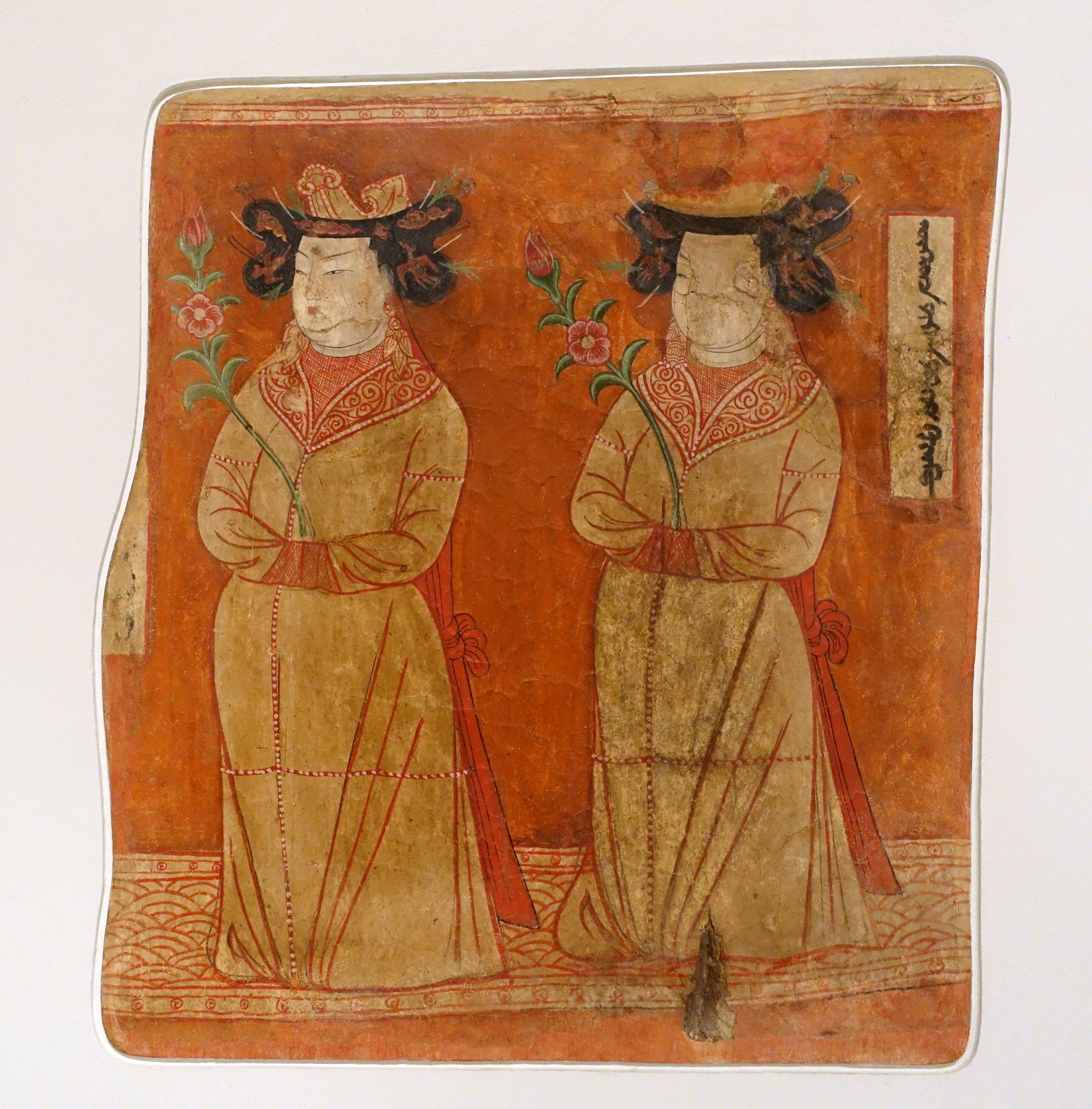
Uyghur princesses, cave 9, wall painting from Bezeklik caves

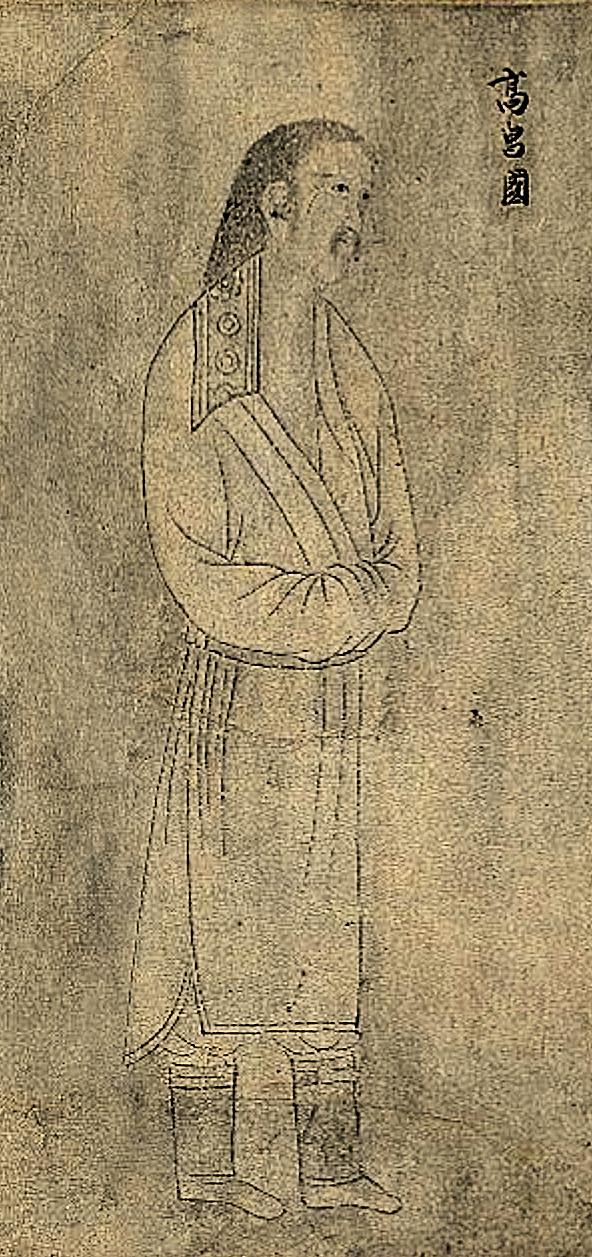
Man of Gaochang (高昌國, Turfan) in 番客入朝圖 (937-976 CE)

=== Uyghur Kingdom of Qocho ===
After 840 Gaochang became occupied by remnants of the Uyghur Khaganate fleeing Yenisei Kirghiz invasion of their land. The Uyghurs established the Kingdom of Qocho (Kara-Khoja) in 850. The inhabitants of Qocho practiced Buddhism, Manichaeism and Christianity. The Uyghurs converted to Buddhism and sponsored building of temple caves in the nearby Bezeklik Thousand Buddha Caves where depictions of Uyghur sponsors may be seen. The Buddhist Uyghur kings, who called themselves idiquts, retained their nomadic lifestyle, residing in Qocho during the winter, but moved to the cooler Bishbalik near Urumchi in the summer.

Qocho later became a vassal state of the Kara-Khitans. However, In 1209, the idiqut Barchuq offered Genghis Khan the suzerainty of his kingdom, and went personally to Genghis Khan with a sizeable tribute when demanded in 1211. The Uyghurs thus went into the service of the Mongols, who later formed the Yuan dynasty in the territories of what is now China. The Uyghurs became bureaucrats (semu) of the Mongol Empire and their Uyghur script was modified for Mongolian. As far south as Quanzhou, preponderance of Gaochang Uyghur in Church of the East inscriptions of the Yuan period attests to their importance in the Christian community there.

The Gaochang area was conquered by the Mongols of the Chagatai Khanate (not part of the Yuan dynasty) from 1275 to 1318 by as many as 120,000 troops.

== Buddhism ==
Buddhism spread to China from India along the northern branch of the Silk Road predominantly in the 4th and 5th centuries as the Liang rulers were Buddhists. The building of Buddhist grottos probably began during this period. There are clusters close to Gaochang, the largest being the Bezeklik grottos.

== Gaochang ruling families ==
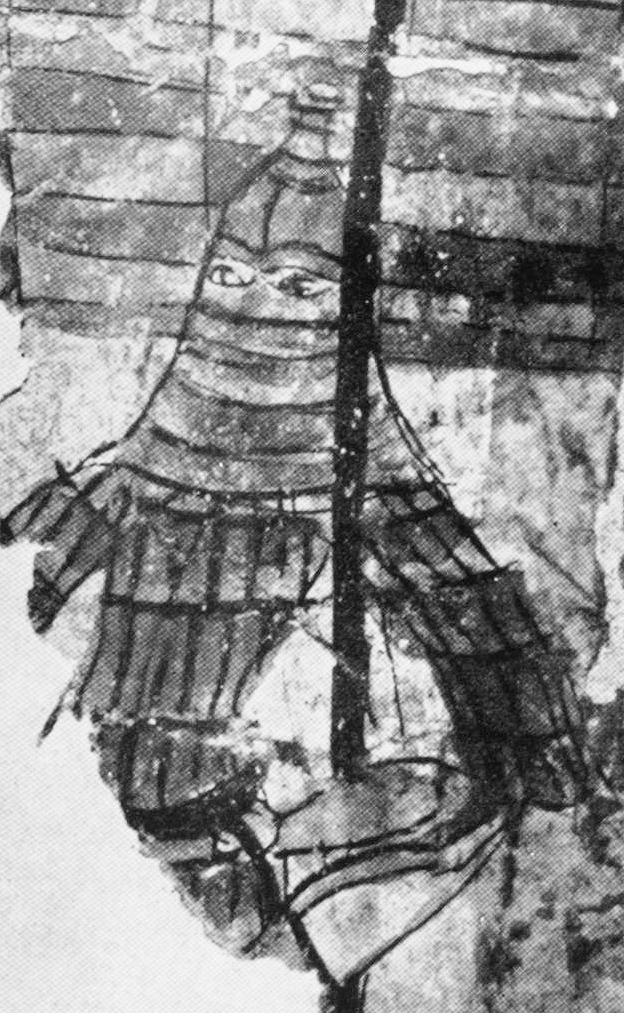
Armoured soldier from Gaochang, 8-9th century

=== Rulers of the Kan Family ===
Name	Pinyin	Durations of reigns	Era names and their according durations
Chinese convention: use family name and given name
闞伯周	Kàn Bózhōu	460–477	Did not exist
闞義成	Kàn Yìchéng	477–478	Did not exist
闞首歸	Kàn Shǒugūi	478–488? or 478–491?	Did not exist

=== Rulers of the Zhang Family ===
Name	Pinyin	Durations of reigns	Era names and their according durations
Chinese convention: use family name and given name
張孟明	Zhāng Mèngmíng	488?–496 or 491?–496	Did not exist

=== Rulers of the Ma Family ===
Name	Pinyin	Durations of reigns	Era names and their according durations
Chinese convention: use family name and given name
馬儒	Mǎ Rú	496–501	Did not exist

=== Rulers of the Qu Family ===
Name	Pinyin	Durations of reigns	Era names and their according durations
Chinese convention: use family name and given name
麴嘉	Qú Jiā	501–525	
麴光	Qú Guāng	525–530	Ganlu (甘露 Gānlù) 525–530
麴堅	Qú Jiān	530–548	Zhanghe (章和 Zhānghé) 531–548
麴玄喜	Qú Xuánxǐ	549–550	Yongping (永平 Yǒngpíng) 549–550
Unnamed son of Qu Xuanxi		551–554	Heping (和平 Hépíng) 551–554
麴寶茂	Qú Bǎomào	555–560	Jianchang (建昌 Jiànchāng) 555–560
麴乾固	Qú Qiángù	560–601	Yanchang (延昌 Yánchāng) 561–601
麴伯雅	Qú Bóyǎ	601–613; 619–623	Yanhe (延和 Yánhé) 602–613 Zhongguang (重光 Zhòngguāng) 620–623
Unnamed usurper		613–619	Yihe (Yìhé 義和) 614–619
麴文泰	Qú Wéntài	623–640	Yanshou (延壽 Yánshòu) 624–640
麴智盛	Qú Zhìshèng	640	did not exist

== Gallery ==
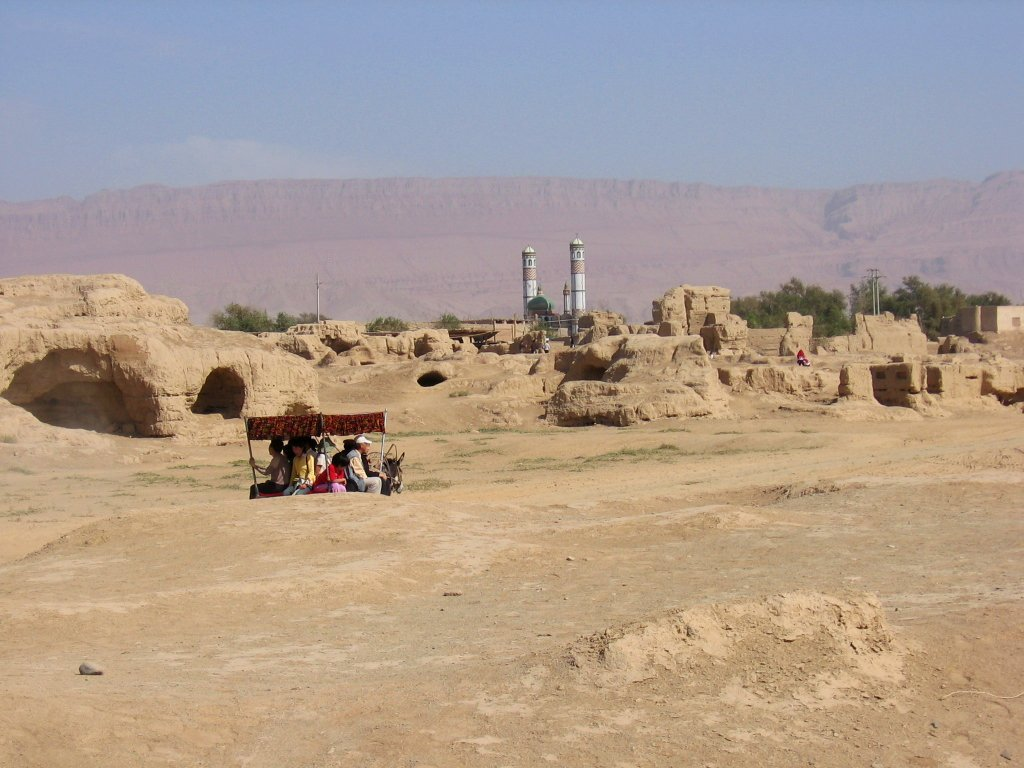
The road leading in.

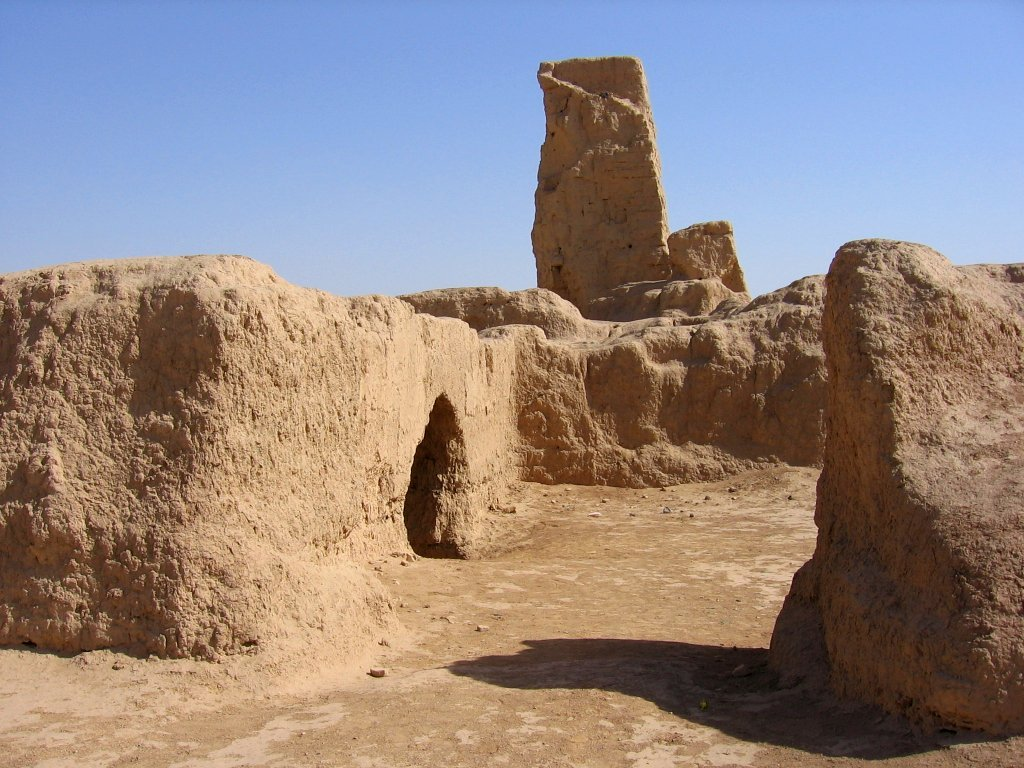
The ruins.

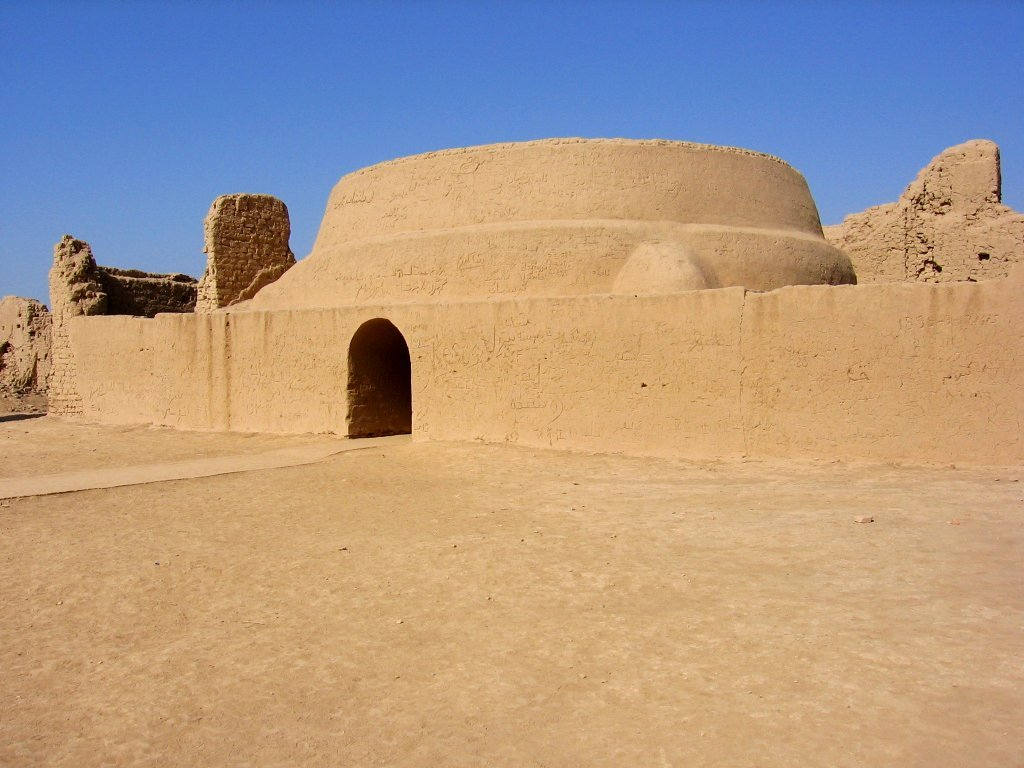
"Main prayer hall".

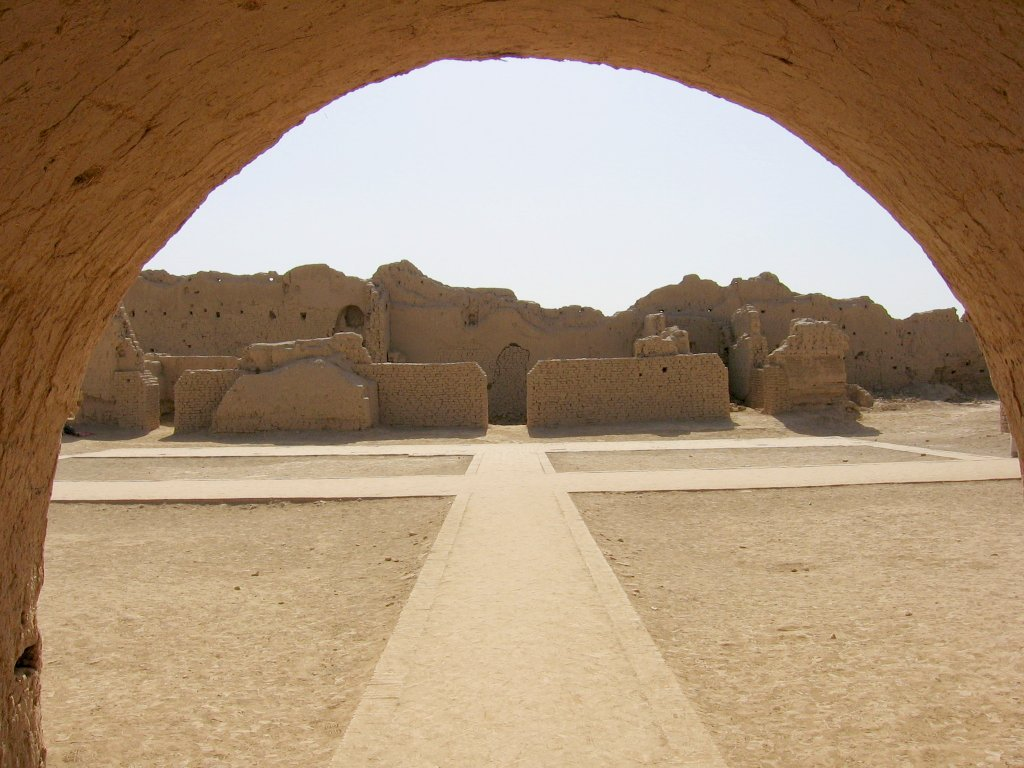
"Main storage building".

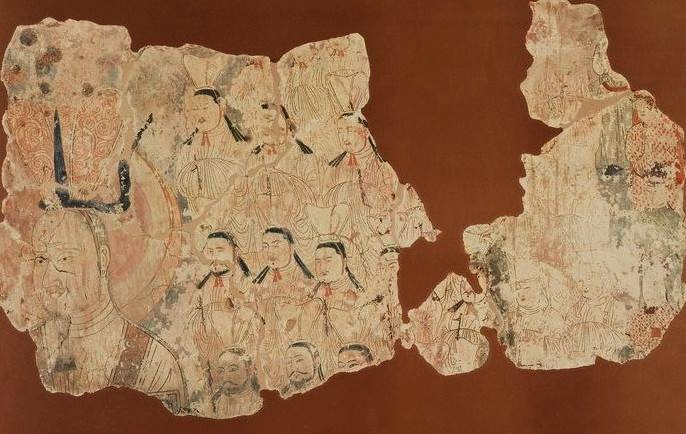
Manichaean wall painting.

== See also ==
- Jiaohe Ruins
- Flaming Mountains
- Trade route
- Silk Road transmission of Buddhism
