= Sanbao Township, Heilongjiang =

Coordinates: 45.7558°N 127.6706°E

Sanbao Township 三宝乡
- Township

Chinese transcription(s)
  - Chinese: 三宝乡
- Interactive map of Sanbao Township
- Country: China
- Province: Heilongjiang
- Prefecture: Harbin
- County: Bin County
- Time zone: UTC+8 (China Standard Time)

Sanbao Township (Chinese: 三宝乡) is a township-level division of Bin County, in the Harbin prefecture-level city of Heilongjiang, China.

== See also ==
- List of township-level divisions of Heilongjiang
