= Juqu Wuhui =

Juqu Wuhui 沮渠無諱
- Prince of Hexi

Ruler of Northern Liang
- Reign: 443–444
- Predecessor: Juqu Mujian
- Successor: Juqu Anzhou
- Died: 444
Full name
- Family name: Jǔqú (沮渠); Given name: Wú huì (無諱)
Era name and dates
- Chéng píng (承平): 443–444
Regnal name
- Prince of Hexi (河西王)
- Dynasty: Northern Liang
- Father: Juqu Mengxun

Juqu Wuhui (Chinese: 沮渠無諱; died 444) is viewed by some historians as a prince of the Lushuihu-led Northern Liang dynasty of China, as after the state's territory was largely seized by the Northern Wei in 439, and his older brother Juqu Mujian (Prince Ai) was captured by Northern Wei, Juqu Wuhui tried to hold out against Northern Wei, initially on Northern Liang's old territory, and later, after that attempt failed, at Gaochang. He continued to use the title of Prince of Hexi, a title used by his brother and previously by his father Juqu Mengxun (Prince Wuxuan). Chinese historians dispute over whether Juqu Wuhui and his successor and brother Juqu Anzhou should be considered Northern Liang rulers or not, and most consider Juqu Mujian the final prince of Northern Liang.

== During Juqu Mujian's reign ==
It is not known when Juqu Wuhui was born. The first historical reference to him was in 437, by which time Juqu Mujian had made him the governor of Jiuquan Commandery (酒泉, roughly modern Jiuquan, Gansu). After the Northern Liang capital Guzang (姑臧, in modern Wuwei, Gansu) was captured by Northern Wei forces, and Juqu Mujian was seized by Emperor Taiwu of Northern Wei, in 439, Northern Wei forces attacked remaining cities held by Juqu clan holdouts, and Juqu Wuhui, after he was joined in Jiuquan by his brother Juqu Yide (沮渠宜得), abandoned Jiuquan and fled initially to Jinchang (晉昌, in modern Jiuquan as well) and then to Dunhuang (敦煌, in modern Dunhuang, Gansu).

== Attempt to hold out and reestablish state ==
In spring 440, Juqu Wuhui tried to recapture Jiuquan. Yuan Jie (元絜), the Northern Wei general in charge of Jiuquan, viewed Juqu Wuhui lightly, and engaged him outside the city. Juqu Wuhui captured him and then put Jiuquan under siege, soon capturing it. He then attacked Zhangye, but could not capture it. Northern Wei's Emperor Taiwu issued an edict ordering him to surrender, and in fall 440, after another general resisting Northern Wei, Tufa Baozhou (禿髮保周), the son of Southern Liang's last prince Tufa Rutan, committed suicide, Juqu Wuhui sent his general Liang Wei (梁偉) to show submission to Northern Wei's general Tuoba Jian (拓跋健) the Prince of Yongchang and Emperor Taiwu's brother, offering to return Jiuquan to Northern Wei control and returning Yuan Jie. In response, in spring 441, Emperor Taiwu created Juqu Wuhui the Prince of Jiuquan.

In summer 441, Juqu Wuhui's cousin Juqu Tang'er (沮渠唐兒), who was defending Dunhuang, rebelled. Juqu Wuhui left another cousin, Juqu Tianzhou (沮渠天周), in charge at Jiuquan, while personally attacking Juqu Tang'er, and Juqu Tang'er was killed in battle. However, as he did so, Northern Wei, still viewing him with suspicion, sent its general Daxi Juan (達奚眷) to besiege Jiuquan. With food supplies running out quickly, by winter 441, Jiuquan fell to Northern Wei forces, and Juqu Tianzhou was killed. Juqu Wuhui himself lacked food at Dunhuang, and he feared Northern Wei's next attack, and he therefore considered reestablishing his state in Xiyu. He first sent his brother Juqu Anzhou against Shanshan, but initially Juqu Anzhou was repelled. However, in 442, Juqu Wuhui abandoned Dunhuang and joined Juqu Anzhou, and the King of Shanshan, in fear, fled, and Juqu Wuhui, half of whose soldiers died of thirst on the way between Dunhuang and Shanshan, took Shanshan.

Meanwhile, however, the former Western Liang general Tang Qi (唐契) was attacking another former Northern Liang general, Hei Shuang (闞爽), at Gaochang. Hei sought help from Juqu Wuhui, but as Juqu Wuhui arrived with aid, Hei had already killed Tang in battle and refused to grant Juqu Wuhui admission. In fall 442, Juqu Wuhui made a surprise attack on Gaochang, capturing it, and Hei fled to Rouran. Juqu Wuhui moved his headquarters to Gaochang, and sent messengers to Liu Song's capital Jiankang, submitting as a vassal and seeking an alliance. Emperor Wen of Liu Song created him the Prince of Hexi.

In 444, Juqu Wuhui died, and Juqu Anzhou succeeded him.

== Personal information ==
- Father
  - Juqu Mengxun (Prince Wuxuan)
- Children
  - Juqu Ganshou (沮渠乾壽)

Prince of Hexi House of Juqu Died: 444
Chinese royalty
| In commission Title last held by Juqu Mujian | Prince of Hexi; 442–444 | Succeeded by Juqu Anzhou |
| In commission Title last held by Juqu Mujian | Prince of Northern Liang; 442–444 | Succeeded by Juqu Anzhou |
