= Juqu Anzhou =

Juqu Anzhou 沮渠安周
- Prince of Hexi

Ruler of Northern Liang
- Reign: 444–460
- Predecessor: Juqu Wuhui
- Died: 460
Full name
- Family name: Jǔqú (沮渠); Given name: Ānzhōu (安周)
Era name and dates
- Chéng píng (承平): 444–460
Regnal name
- Prince of Hexi (河西王)
- Dynasty: Northern Liang
- Father: Juqu Mengxun

Juqu Anzhou (Chinese: 沮渠安周; died 460) is viewed by some historians as a ruler of the Lushuihu-led Chinese Northern Liang dynasty. After the state's territory was largely seized by the Northern Wei in 439, and his older brother Juqu Mujian (Prince Ai) was captured by Northern Wei, Juqu Anzhou's brother Juqu Wuhui tried to hold out against Northern Wei, initially on Northern Liang's old territory, and later, after that attempt failed, at Gaochang. Juqu Anzhou succeeded Juqu Wuhui after Juqu Wuhui's death in 444, and he continued to use the title of Prince of Hexi, a title used by his brothers and previously by his father Juqu Mengxun (Prince Wuxuan). Chinese historians dispute over whether Juqu Wuhui and Juqu Anzhou should be considered Northern Liang rulers or not, and most consider Juqu Mujian the final prince of Northern Liang.

== During Juqu Mujian's reign and Juqu Wuhui's campaign/reign ==
It is not known when Juqu Anzhou was born. The first historical reference to him was in 431, when Juqu Mengxun sent him to visit the Northern Wei capital Pingcheng (平城, in modern Datong, Shanxi). The next reference to him was in 439, when the Northern Liang capital Guzang (姑臧, in modern Wuwei, Gansu) was captured by Northern Wei forces, and Juqu Mujian was seized by Emperor Taiwu of Northern Wei, and Northern Wei forces attacked remaining cities held by Juqu clan holdouts. Juqu Anzhou was the governor of Ledu Commandery (樂都, in modern Haidong Prefecture, Qinghai) at this point, and he abandoned Ledu and fled to Tuyuhun. By winter 441, however, he had joined Juqu Wuhui at Dunhuang, and Juqu Wuhui, who had recently lost Jiuquan to Northern Wei, wanted to try to reestablish his rule in the Western Regions (Xiyu, modern Xinjiang and former Soviet Central Asia). He sent Juqu Anzhou to attack Shanshan, but Juqu Anzhou could not capture it initially. In 442, however, Juqu Wuhui arrived to join him, and the king of Shanshan, in fear, fled, and Juqu Wuhui took over Shanshan. Later that year, they would relocate to Gaochang. In 444, Juqu Wuhui died, and Juqu Anzhou succeeded him.

== Reign ==
Late in 444, Emperor Wen of Liu Song officially created Juqu Anzhou the Prince of Hexi. Very little is known about his reign at Gaochang, other than that he continued to use Juqu Wuhui's era name of Chengping, and that after he seized the forces under the command of Juqu Wuhui's son Juqu Ganshou (沮渠乾壽), Juqu Ganshou surrendered to Northern Wei. It appeared that Juqu Anzhou tried to maintain a good relationship with Rouran. However, in 460, for reasons unknown, Rouran attacked Gaochang and killed Juqu Anzhou, and then his clan. Rouran forces made Kan Bozhou (闞伯周) the King of Gaochang instead.

Prince of Hexi House of Juqu Died: 460
Chinese royalty
Preceded by Juqu Wuhui	Prince of Hexi; 444–460	Extinct
Preceded by Juqu Wuhui	Prince of Northern Liang; 444–460	Extinct
