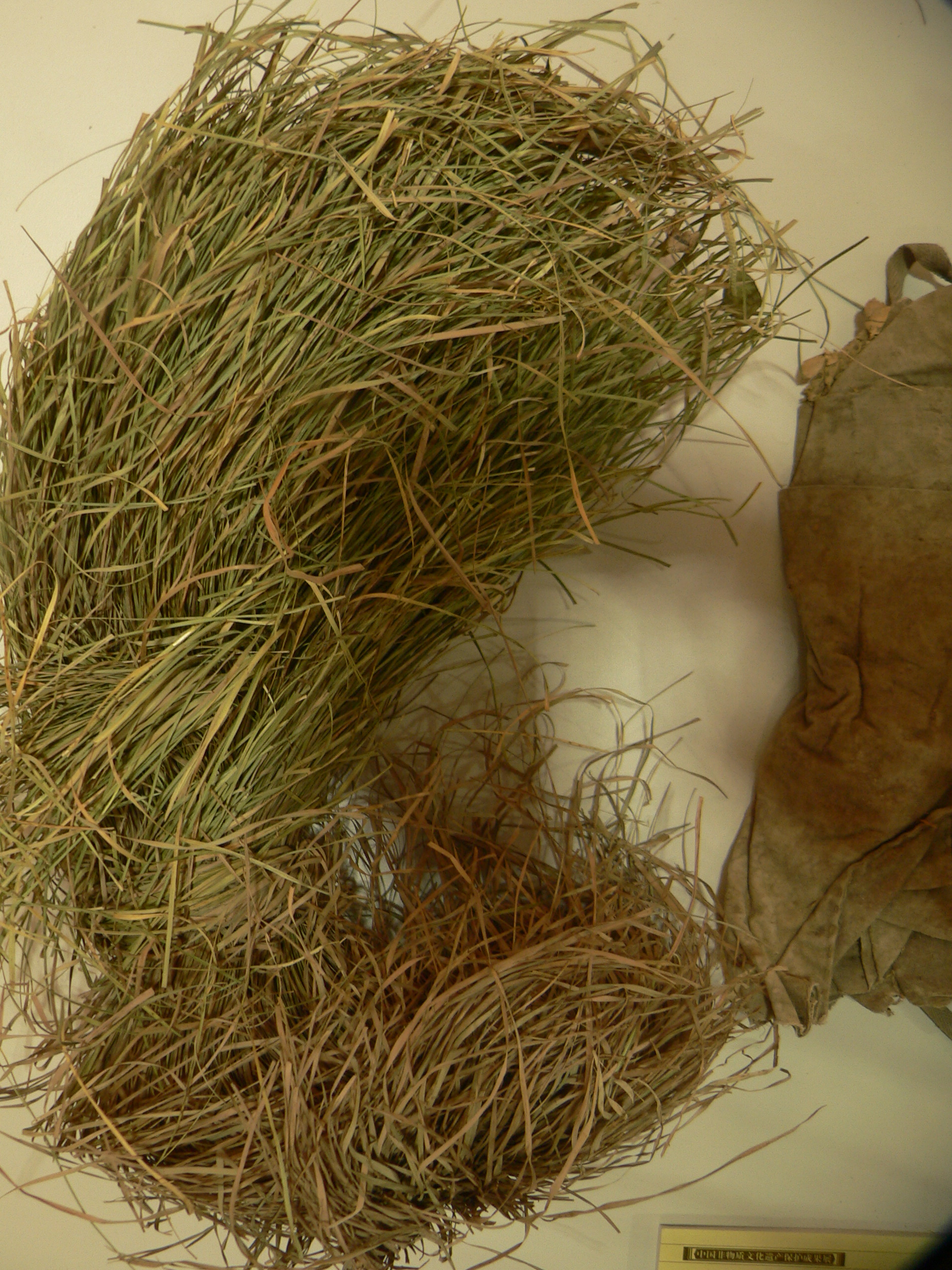

Scientific classification
- Kingdom: Plantae
- Clade: Tracheophytes
- Clade: Angiosperms
- Clade: Monocots
- Clade: Commelinids
- Order: Poales
- Family: Cyperaceae
- Genus: Carex
- Species: C. meyeriana

Binomial name
- Carex meyeriana Kunth

= Carex meyeriana =

Species of grass-like plant

Carex meyeriana is a species of sedge native across Siberia to north and central Japan.

== Description ==
Carex meyeriana grows 50 cm (19.7 in) tall.

== Distribution ==
Carex meyeriana is native to Siberia and Japan.
