= Bin County, Heilongjiang =

Bin County 宾县
- County
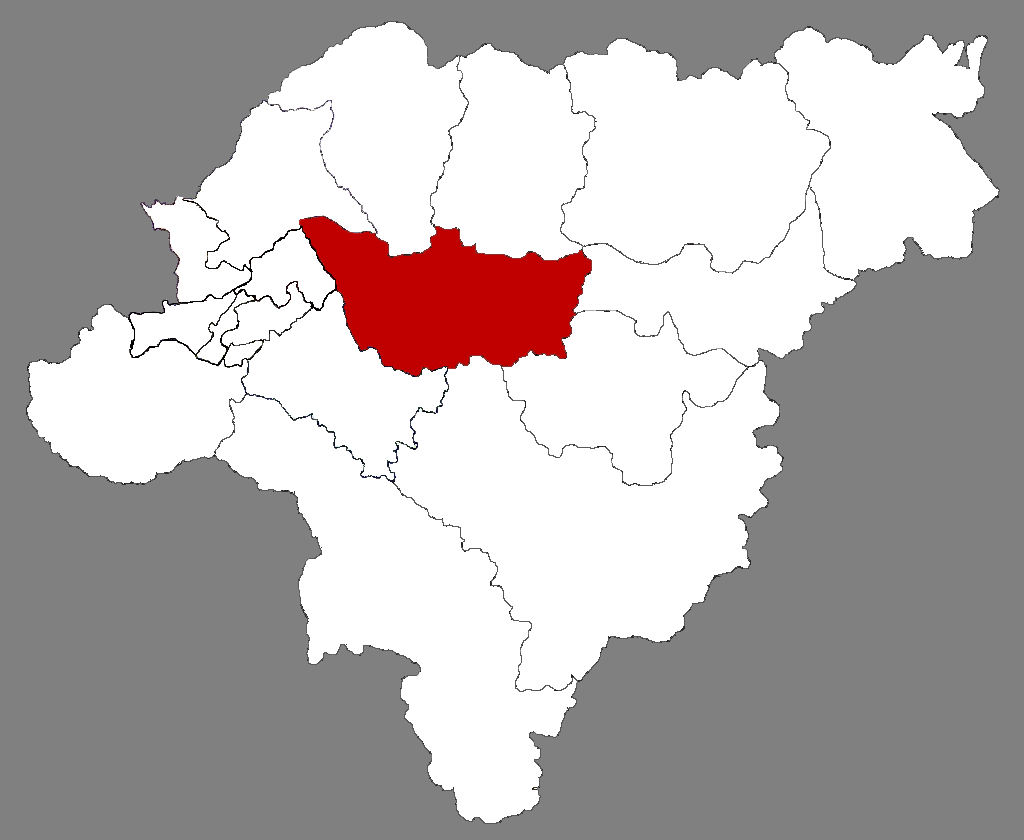
- Location of Bin in Harbin

- Location of the seat in Heilongjiang
- Coordinates: 45°45′25″N 127°29′06″E
- Country: People's Republic of China
- Province: Heilongjiang
- Sub-provincial city: Harbin
- Divisions: 12 towns 5 townships
- Seat: Binzhou (宾州镇)

Area
  - Total: 3,844.7 km^{2} (1,484.4 sq mi)
- Elevation: 163 m (535 ft)

Population (2019)
  - Total: 567,313
  - Density: 147.56/km^{2} (382.17/sq mi)
- Time zone: UTC+8 (China Standard)
- Postal code: 1504XX
- Area code: 0451

Bin County, or Binxian (simplified Chinese: 宾县; traditional Chinese: 賓縣; pinyin: Bīn Xiàn), is a county of Heilongjiang Province, Northeast China, under the administration of the prefecture-level city of Harbin, the capital of Heilongjiang. Its seat is about 60 kilometres (37 mi) east of central Harbin. It borders Bayan County and Mulan County to the north, Fangzheng County to the east, Yanshou County to the southeast, Shangzhi to the south, Acheng District to the southwest, Daowai District to the west, and Hulan District to the northwest.

== Administrative divisions ==
There are 12 towns and five townships in the county:

=== Towns (镇) ===
- Binzhou (宾州镇)
- Juren (居仁镇)
- Binxi (宾西镇)
- Tangfang (糖坊镇)
- Bin'an (宾安镇)
- Xindian (新甸镇)
- Shengli (胜利镇)
- Ningyuan (宁远镇)
- Baidu (摆渡镇)
- Pingfang (平坊镇)
- Manjing (满井镇)
- Chang'an (常安镇)

=== Townships (乡) ===
- Yonghe Township (永和乡)
- Niaohe Township (鸟河乡)
- Minhe Township (民和乡)
- Jingjian Township (经建乡)
- Sanbao Township (三宝乡)

== Demographics ==
The population of the district was 596,640 in 1999.

== Climate ==
Climate data for Binxian, elevation 184 m (604 ft), (1991–2020 normals, extremes 1981–2010)
Month	Jan	Feb	Mar	Apr	May	Jun	Jul	Aug	Sep	Oct	Nov	Dec	Year
Record high °C (°F)	2.9 (37.2)	12.2 (54.0)	19.4 (66.9)	29.3 (84.7)	34.1 (93.4)	37.8 (100.0)	36.1 (97.0)	35.6 (96.1)	31.3 (88.3)	26.4 (79.5)	17.7 (63.9)	8.4 (47.1)	37.8 (100.0)
Mean daily maximum °C (°F)	−11.7 (10.9)	−6.1 (21.0)	2.6 (36.7)	13.5 (56.3)	21.0 (69.8)	26.0 (78.8)	27.9 (82.2)	26.4 (79.5)	21.4 (70.5)	12.5 (54.5)	0.1 (32.2)	−9.6 (14.7)	10.3 (50.6)
Daily mean °C (°F)	−17.1 (1.2)	−11.9 (10.6)	−2.8 (27.0)	7.6 (45.7)	15.2 (59.4)	20.7 (69.3)	23.2 (73.8)	21.5 (70.7)	15.6 (60.1)	6.9 (44.4)	−4.6 (23.7)	−14.5 (5.9)	5.0 (41.0)
Mean daily minimum °C (°F)	−21.8 (−7.2)	−17.3 (0.9)	−8.1 (17.4)	1.9 (35.4)	9.4 (48.9)	15.5 (59.9)	18.6 (65.5)	17.1 (62.8)	10.2 (50.4)	1.8 (35.2)	−8.8 (16.2)	−18.8 (−1.8)	0.0 (32.0)
Record low °C (°F)	−34.0 (−29.2)	−33.1 (−27.6)	−23.9 (−11.0)	−8.6 (16.5)	−1.8 (28.8)	5.1 (41.2)	10.1 (50.2)	8.6 (47.5)	−0.7 (30.7)	−13.5 (7.7)	−25.0 (−13.0)	−31.6 (−24.9)	−34.0 (−29.2)
Average precipitation mm (inches)	3.9 (0.15)	5.1 (0.20)	12.7 (0.50)	21.2 (0.83)	66.3 (2.61)	92.1 (3.63)	154.8 (6.09)	118.7 (4.67)	65.0 (2.56)	28.2 (1.11)	15.1 (0.59)	8.0 (0.31)	591.1 (23.25)
Average precipitation days (≥ 0.1 mm)	5.4	4.8	6.5	7.6	12.5	14.4	14.4	13.6	10.6	7.4	6.9	7.7	111.8
Average snowy days	8.1	7.1	8.0	3.1	0.2	0	0	0	0	2.4	8.4	10.7	48
Average relative humidity (%)	69	63	56	50	54	66	76	78	69	60	63	69	64
Mean monthly sunshine hours	177.4	202.3	241.8	240.0	261.9	268.4	259.8	244.9	234.7	195.4	161.6	155.9	2,644.1
Percentage possible sunshine	63	69	65	59	57	57	55	57	63	59	58	58	60
Source: China Meteorological Administration

== Transport ==
- G1011 Harbin–Tongjiang Expressway, which provides access to downtown Harbin
