= Jushi Kingdom =

Chinese kingdom (108 BC - 450 AD)

Jushi 車師
- 108 BC–450 AD
- The Jushi kingdom and contemporary polities of continental Asia, circa 400 AD
- Status: Kingdom
- Capital: Jiaohe (交河)
- Government: Monarchy
- History
  - Established: 108 BC
  - Vassal of the Han dynasty: 60 BC
  - Destroyed by the Northern Liang: 450 AD

The Jushi (Chinese: 車師; pinyin: Jūshī, sometimes pronounced Cheshi), or Gushi (Chinese: 姑師; pinyin: Gūshī), were a people probably associated with the Subeshi culture, who established a kingdom during the 1st millennium BC in the Turpan basin (modern Xinjiang, China). The kingdom included the area of Ayding Lake, in the eastern Tian Shan range. During the late 2nd and early 1st century BC, the area was increasingly dominated by the Han dynasty and the northern neighbours of the Jushi, the Xiongnu, and became one of the many minor states of the Western Regions of Han dynasty China. In 450 AD the Northern Liang destroyed the state of Jushi (車師) and occupied its capital city of Jiaohe (Yarkhoto).

The Jushi may have been one of the Tocharian peoples and spoken one of the associated languages.

== Historical accounts ==
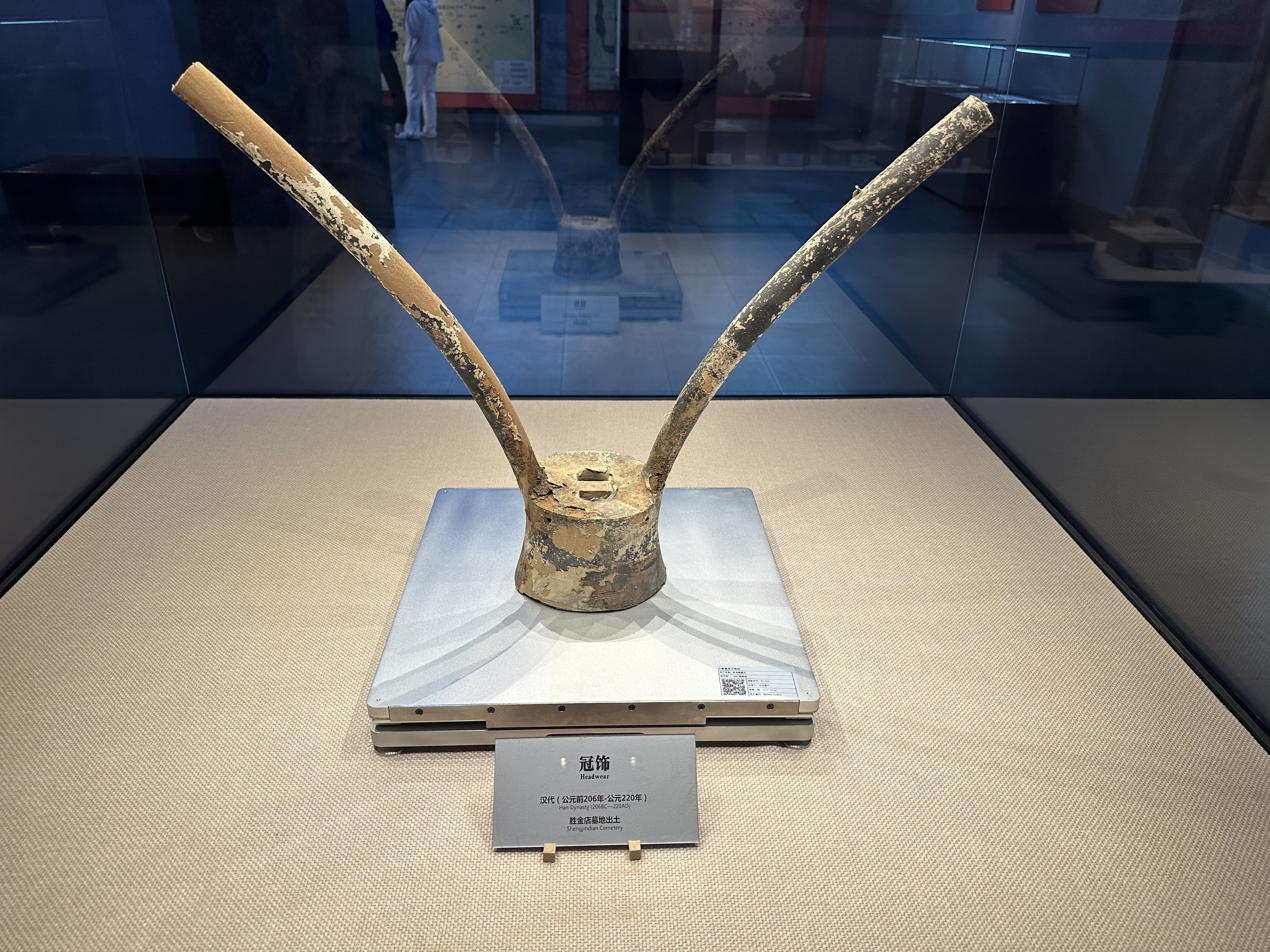
Headwear from Shengjindian cemetery, Han dynasty period, 206 BC –230 AD. Turpan Museum

According to J. P. Mallory and Victor H. Mair, the earliest accounts of the Jushi report them to have "lived in tents, followed the grasses and waters, and had considerable knowledge of agriculture. They owned cattle, horses, camels, sheep and goats. They were proficient with bows and arrows".

Jushi and the kingdom of Krorän were linked in the account of Zhang Qian (d. 113 BC), in part because both were under the control of the Xiongnu.

Around 60 BC, the Han—ruled at the time by Emperor Xuan—defeated Xiongnu forces at the Battle of Jushi, during the Han–Xiongnu Wars. Afterwards the main part of the Jushi lands was divided into two states: a southern area controlled by the Han, who referred to it as "Nearer Jushi" (or "Anterior Jushi"), and a northern area known to the Han as "Further Jushi" (or "Posterior Jushi") that was dominated by the Xiongnu. Nearer Jushi was administered by the Han from a capital at Jiaohe (16 km (9.9 mi) west of the site of modern Turpan). The capital of Further Jushi appears to have been called Yuli or Yulai, and was located about 10 km (6.2 mi) north of Jimasa, 200 km (120 mi) north of Jiaohe. The Jushi never regained their independence.

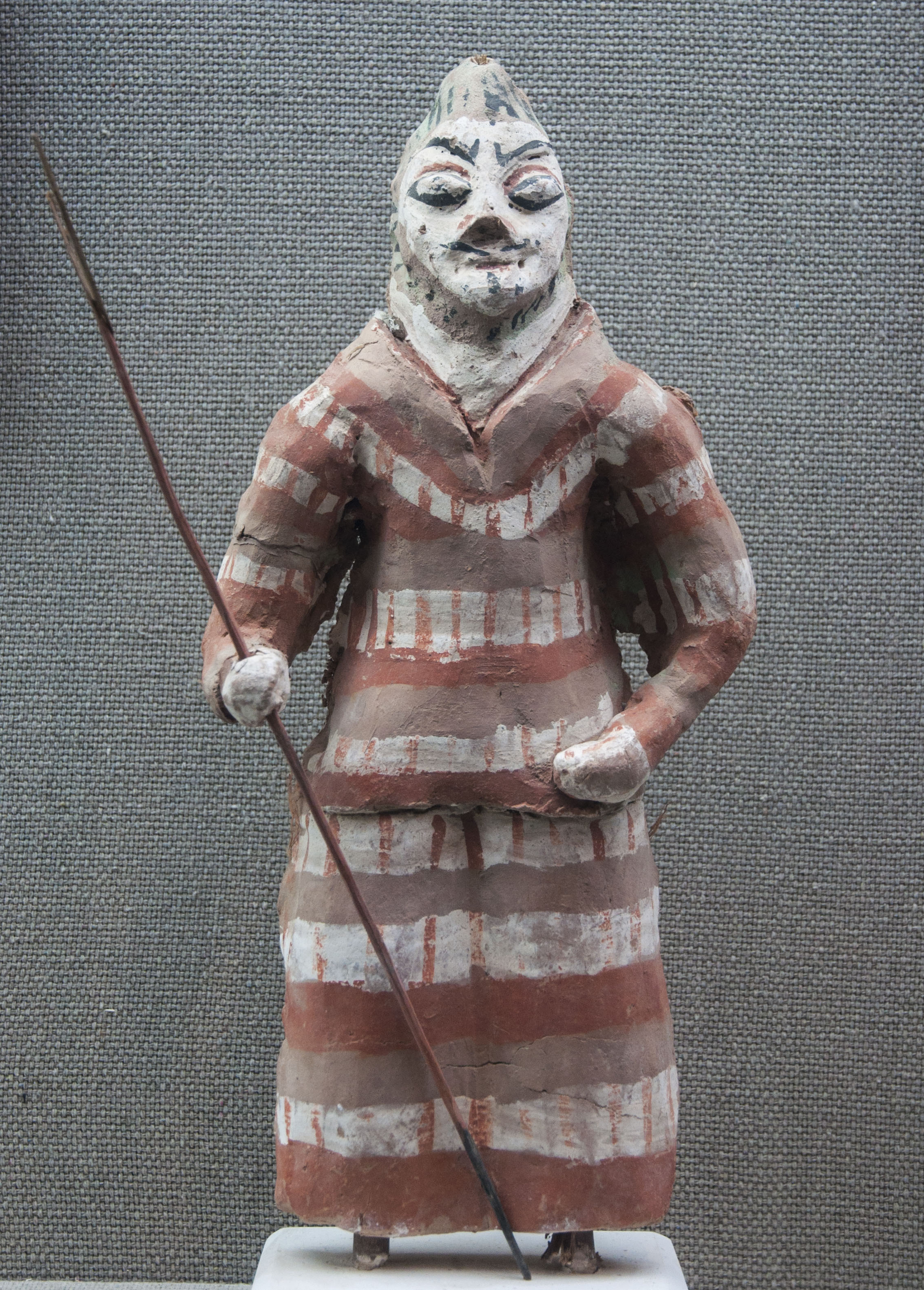
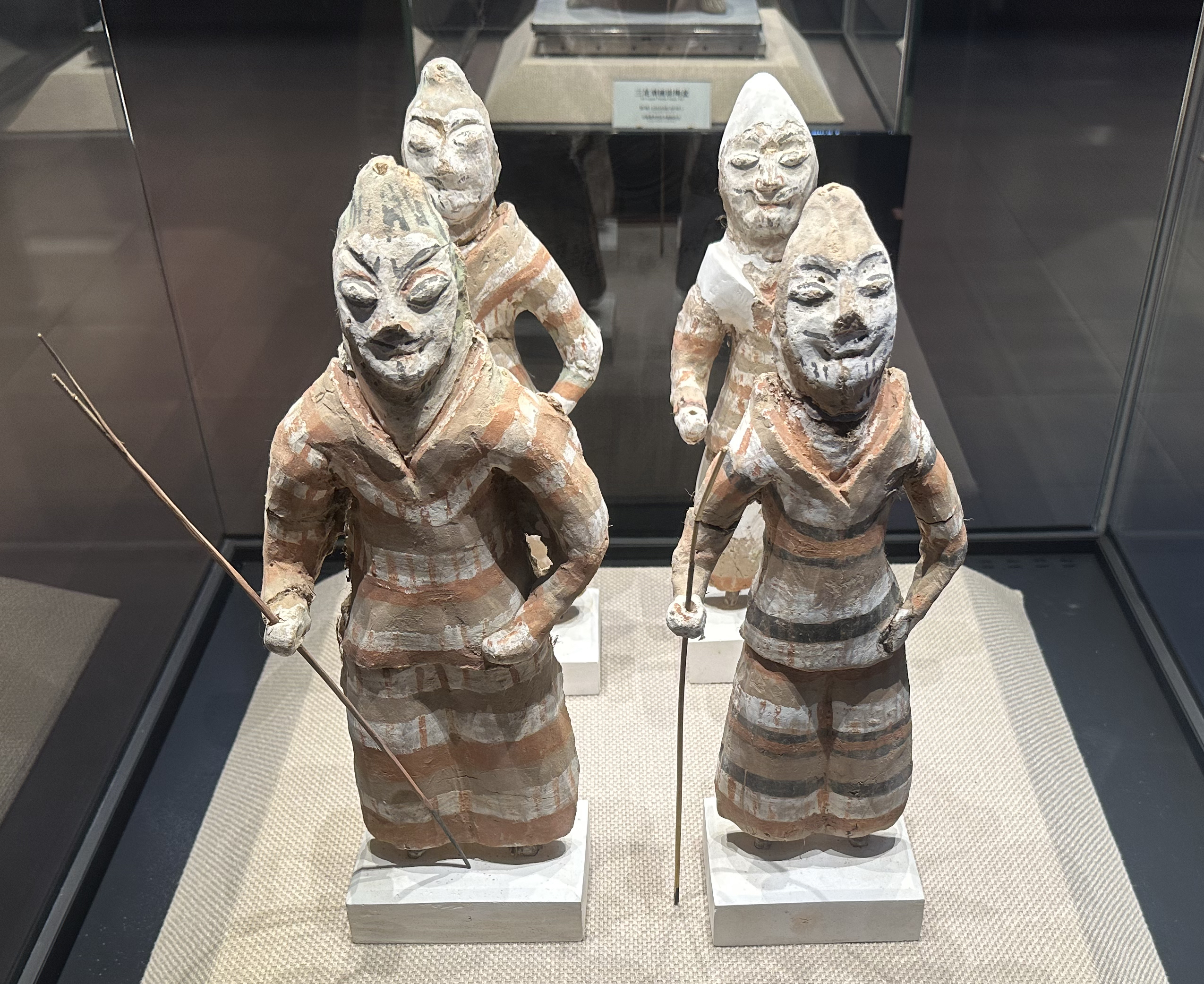
Painted warriors, Yanghai tomb, Gaochang Prefecture period, 327-460 AD. The Jushi capital of Jiaohe was occupied, and the state of Jushi was destroyed, in 450 AD.

Around 442 AD, Juqu Wuhui and Juqu Anzhou of the Northern Liang fled to Gaochang after their defeat against the Northern Wei. They ousted the local Gaochang governor Kan Shuang who escaped to the Rouran Khaganate, and they established the state of Greater Liang in Gaochang, the "Northern Liang of Gaochang". They destroyed the state of Jushi in 450 AD and occupied Jiaohe.

In 460, the Rouran invaded the area, killed Juqu Anzhou, and established the first Gaochang Kingdom under the Chinese Kan Bozhou (r. 460 – c. 477), who was succeeded in 477 by his son Yicheng (義成).

In 488 the king of the Turkic Gaoju Afuzhiluo, an enemy of the Rouran, took over Gaochang, and established the Zhang dynasty of rulers, starting with Zhang Mengming (r. 491–496) as king of Gaochang.

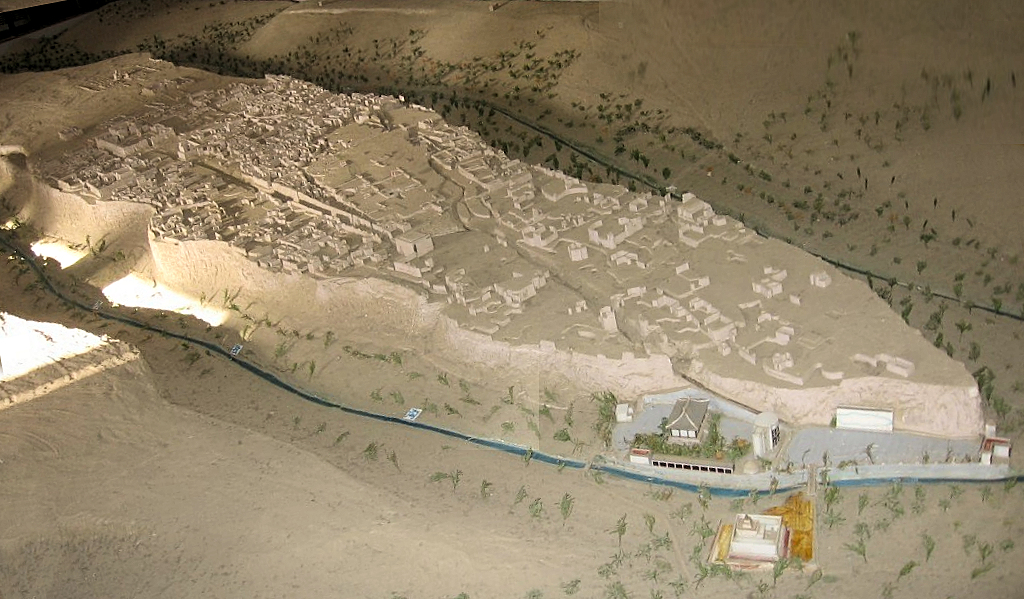
Model of the ancient capital city of Jiaohe on its plateau

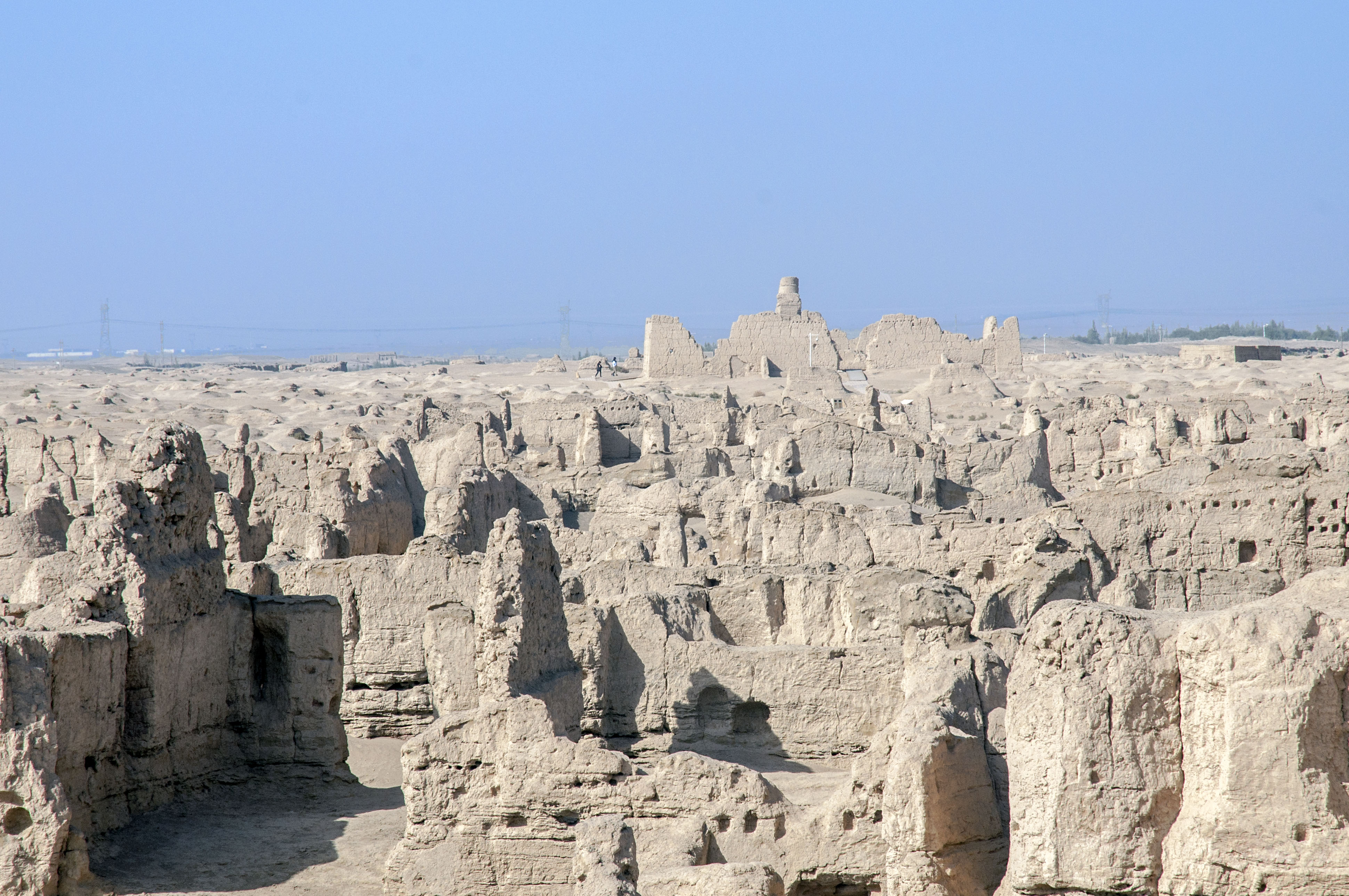
Ruins of Jiaohe

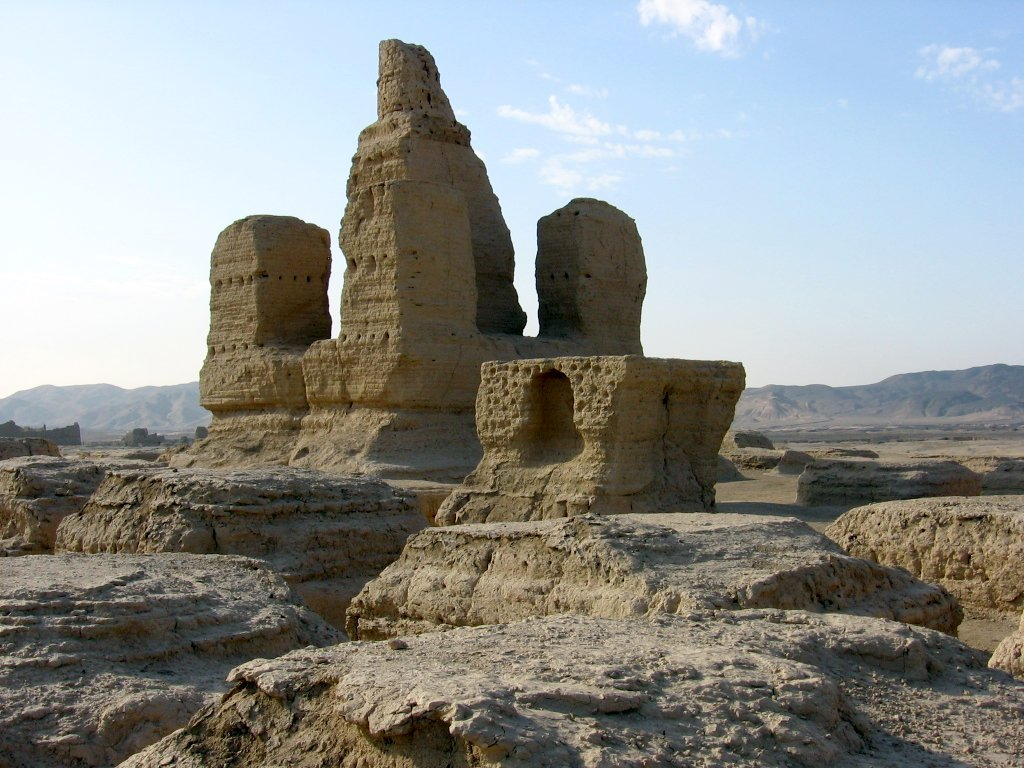
Buddhist stupa of Jiaohe

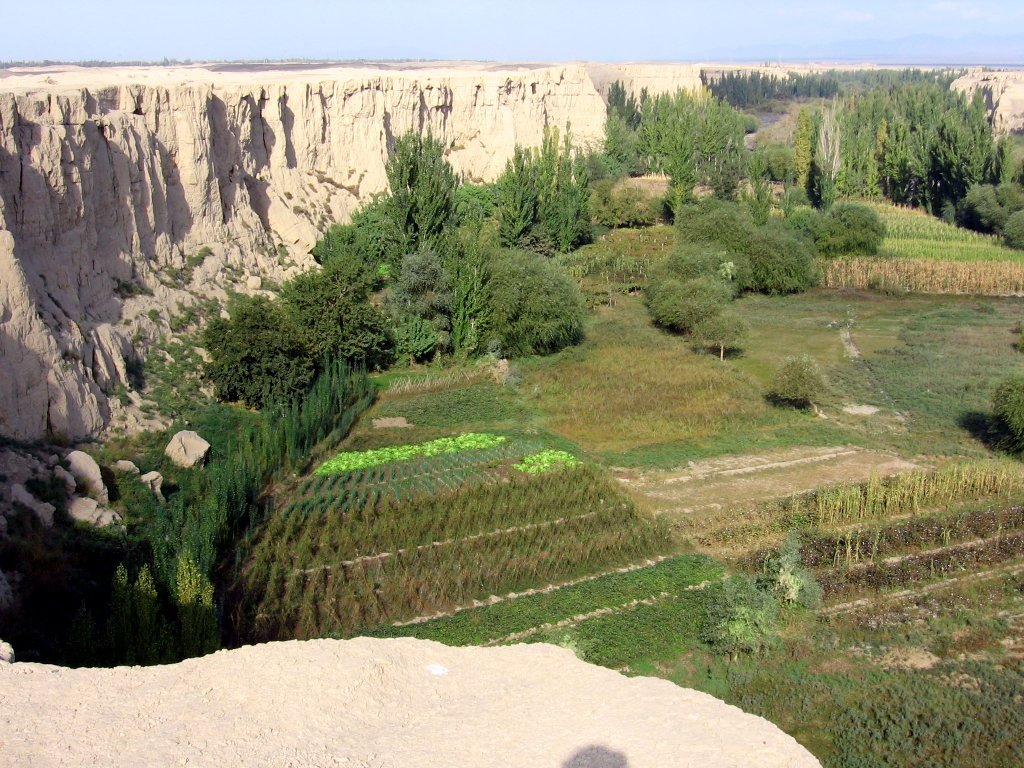
Landscape at the foot of the plateau on which Jiaohe is located

== Archaeology ==
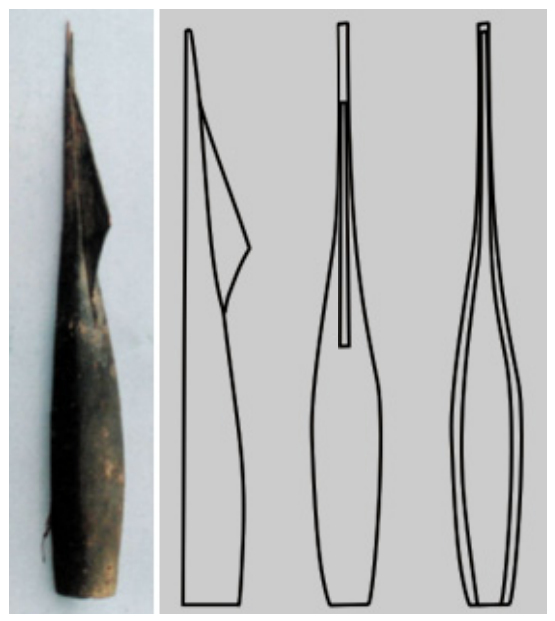
Fish-shaped high-peaked hat, Yanghai cemetery.

A 2,700-year-old grave discovered in 2008 at the Yanghai Tombs, an ancient cemetery (54,000 m^{2} (580,000 sq ft) in area), has been attributed to the Jushi or a precursor culture. The remains belonged probably to a shaman. Near the shaman's head and foot were a large leather basket and wooden bowl filled with 789 grams of dried cannabis, superbly preserved by climatic and burial conditions. An international team demonstrated that this material contained tetrahydrocannabinol, the psychoactive component of cannabis. The cannabis was clearly "cultivated for psychoactive purposes," rather than as fibre for clothing or as food. It may have been employed as a medicinal agent, or an aid to divination. This is the oldest known use of cannabis as a pharmacological agent. The extremely dry conditions and alkaline soil acted as preservatives, allowing a team of scientists to carefully analyze the stash, which still looked green though it had lost its distinctive odour.

A horse saddle made of cow hide was discovered inside a woman's grave at the Yanghai Tombs, dating to between 727 and 396 BC. A second, badly fragmented saddle was found next to a man, in a tomb dated between 700 and 300 BC, making these possibly the earliest saddles in the world, slightly predating the saddles of the Pazyryk culture.

== See also ==
- Tarim mummies
