= Yanghai leather scale armor =

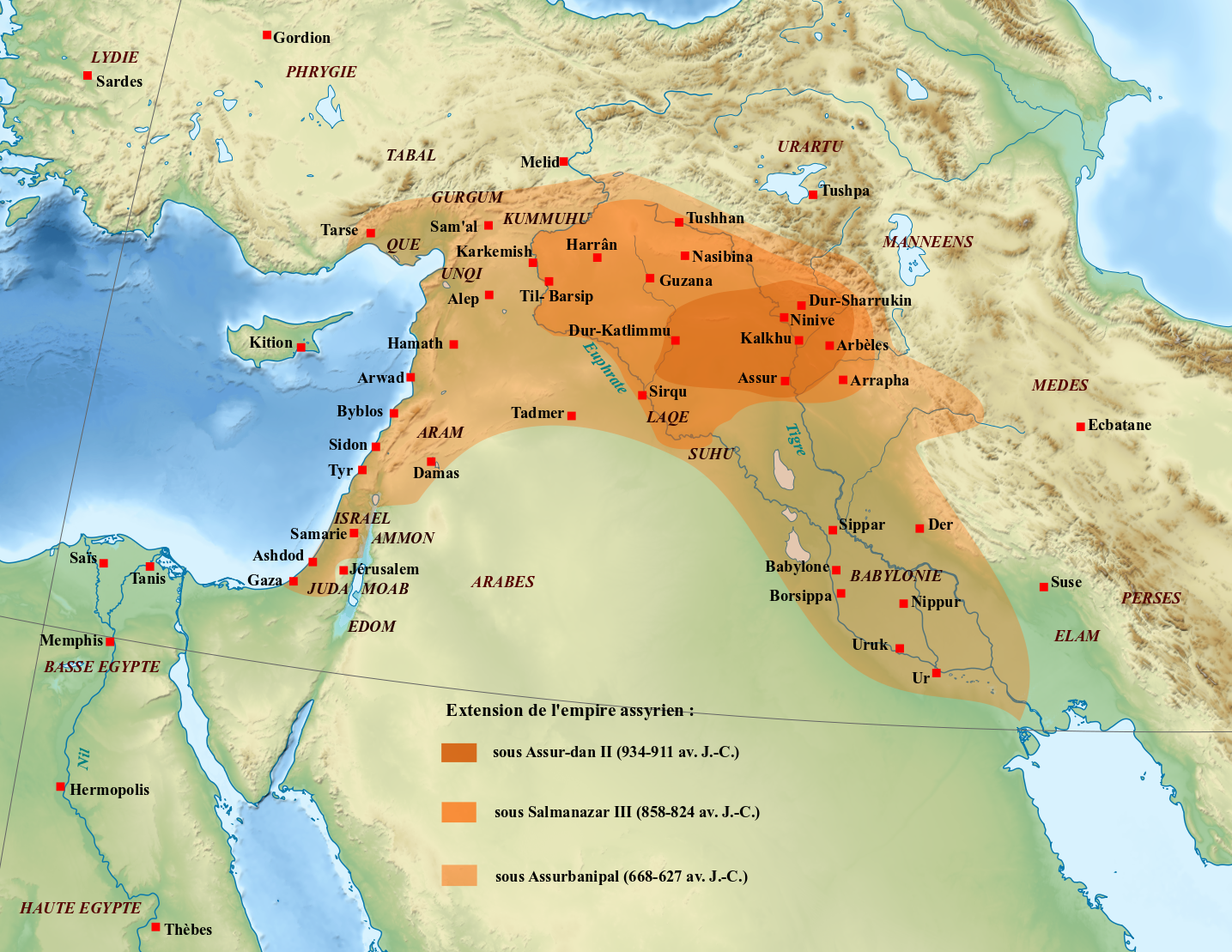
The Neo-Assyrian Empire, where the leather scaled armor piece was made and sold to China

The Yanghai leather scale armor is a piece of Assyrian-style leather armor that was dated to be from 786-543 BCE in northwest China and was manufactured in the Neo-Assyrian Empire.

The leathered armor is made up of 5,444 smaller scales and 140 large scales, and a total weight of 4–5 kg.

It was found in 2013 on a possible 30 year old horse rider at the Yanghai cemetery (Subeshi culture).

It is unique due to being the only complete scaled armor of any material. One theory for why this survived for 2,700 years is that the arid climate prevented it from rotting away.

The Yanghai leather scale armor was made from small shield-shaped plates organized in horizontal rows and sewn onto a backing. Because of the expensive supplies, material and laborious manufacturing, armors were treasured, and carrying them was considered a privilege of the elite. It was uncommon for the Neo-Assyrian Empire to be buried with the proprietor.
