= Subeshi culture =

Iron Age culture in Xinjiang, China

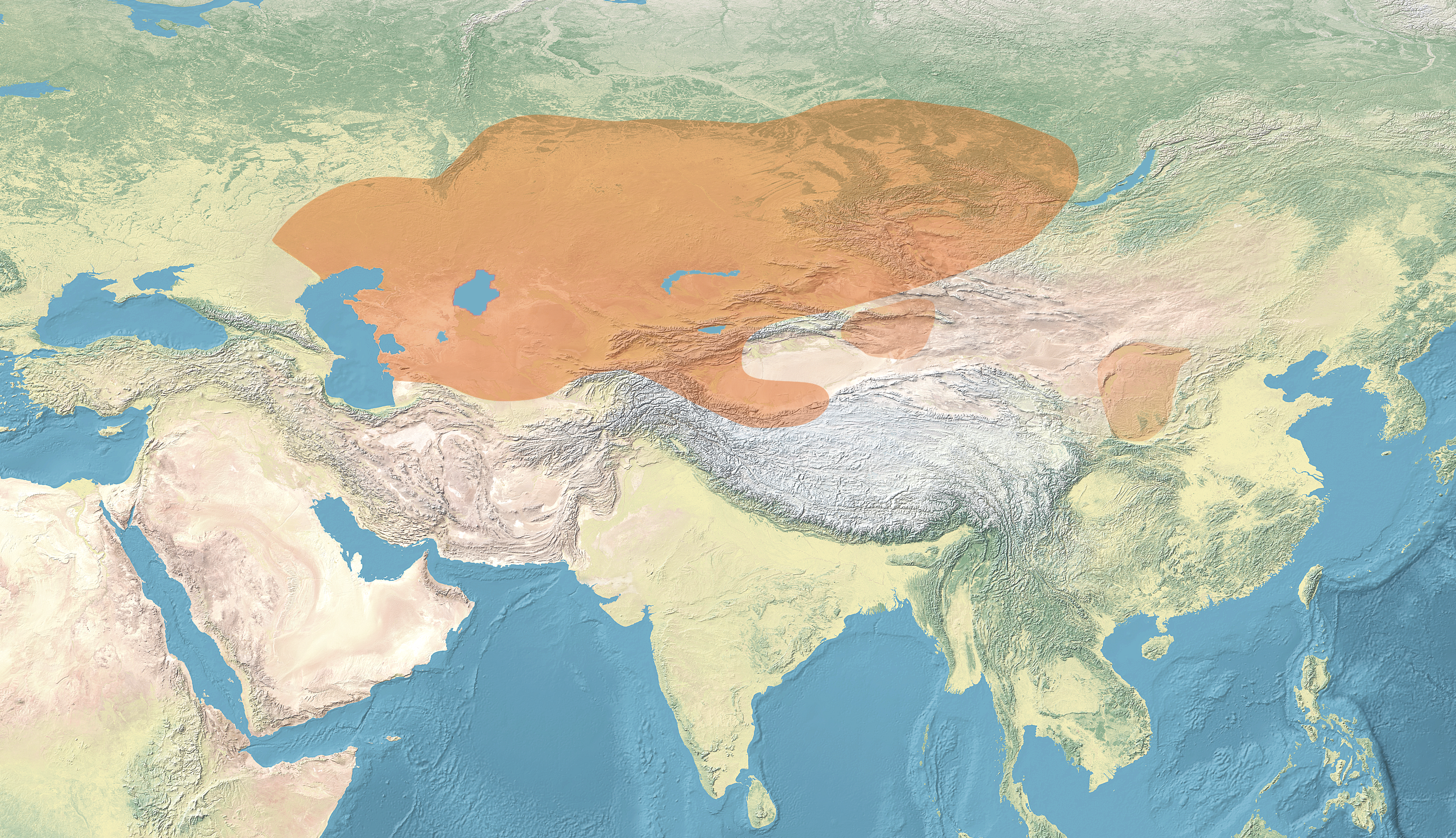
- General location of the Subeshi culture, next to the Saka realm ( ), and contemporary Asian polities c. 325 BCE
- Geographical range: Turpan, Xinjiang, China
- Dates: 1100–100 BCE
- Preceded by: Chemurchek culture
- Followed by: Jushi Kingdom, Xiongnu

The Subeshi culture (simplified Chinese: 苏贝希文化; traditional Chinese: 蘇貝希文化; 1100–100 BCE), also rendered as Subeishi culture or Subeixi culture, is an Iron Age culture from the area of Shanshan County, Turfan, Xinjiang, at the eastern edge of the Tarim Basin. The Subeshi culture contributes some of the later period Tarim Mummies. It might be associated with the Jushi Kingdom known from Chinese historical sources. The culture includes three closely related cemeteries:

- the Subeshi cemetery
- the Shengjindian cemetery,
- the Yanghai cemetery.

After 200 BCE, the Subeshi culture may have evolved into the later walled city-state culture of the Jushi Kingdom.

== Characteristics ==
The origins of the Subeshi culture were influenced by the cultures of West Asia and Central Asia as far back as the late Neolithic period and the early Bronze Age, when bronze technology, pottery and ornamation styles were introduced from the west, before spreading further east to the early cultures of China, such as the Siba culture (about 2000–1600 BCE), Qijia culture (2500–1500 BCE) or Chawuhugoukou culture (around 800–100 BCE).

The Subeshi culture is known for its Iron Age graveyards of the 1st millennium BCE, which resemble those of the Saka (Scythian) Pazyryk culture of the Altai Mountains. In particular, weaponry, horse gear and garments are similar to those of the Pazyryk culture.

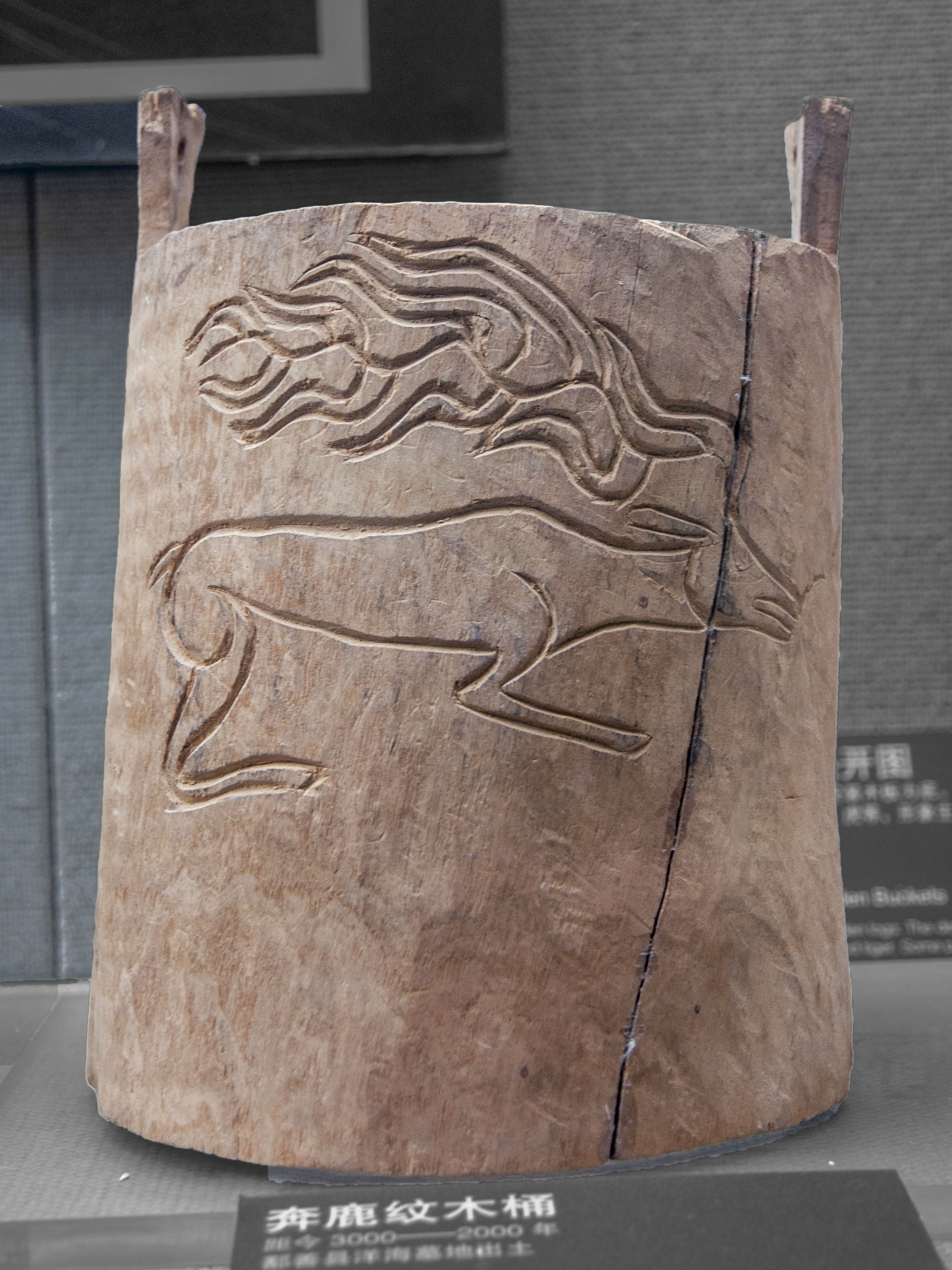
A wooden bucket of the Subeshi culture, with the Scytho-Siberian art motif of an elk with horns. Yanghai cemetery. Turpan Museum

The "Witches of Subeshi" (4th or 3rd century BCE) wore 2-foot-long (0.61 m) black felt conical hats with a flat brim. Though modern Westerners tend to identify this type of hat as the headgear of a witch, there is evidence that these pointed hats were widely worn by both women and men in some Central Asian tribes. For instance, the Persian king Darius recorded a victory over the "Sakas of the pointed hats". The Subeshi headgear is likely an ethnic badge or a symbol of position in the society. Also found at Subeshi was a man with traces of a surgical operation on his abdomen; the incision is sewn up with sutures made of horsehair.

The Subeshi culture is a candidate for the Iron Age predecessors of the Tocharians. The material culture of the Subeshi culture is very similar to that of Saka sites such as Arzhan or Tasmola, but is also known to have spread across the northern Chinese steppes from Xinjiang to the Korean Peninsula, particularly through bronze weapons, horse harnesses, and ornaments. The Subeshi site of Yanghai yielded what maybe the world's oldest known horse saddle, already displaying many characteristics of today's modern saddles, for which a radiocarbon date of 727–396 BCE (95.4% probability range) has been obtained: this is contemporaneous or possibly older than the previous "oldest saddle" from the Scythian Pazyryk culture site of Tuekta barrow no. 1 (430–420 BCE). Knotted carpet with colorful wave-like motifs were dated to 700 BCE, and are now the oldest known knotted carpet in the world, before the 4th century BCE Pazyryk carpets.

Scythian-style bows were also discovered in Subeshi. The technical sophistication of these bows suggests intense technological transfer between the Saka areas and the Subeishi culture areas. No other Tarim Basin area benefited from this technological transfer, which was supplemented by some adaptation by the Subeishi people: the bows were slightly bigger, and used lacquer as an original compounds, suggesting technological contact with China as well.

In terms of genetics, Afanasievo ancestry has been identified among Iron Age Dzungarian populations.

=== Origin and language ===
The language of the Subeshi mummies is unknown at this point. Looking at the linguistic history of the region, the Subeshi mummies may have spoken the Saka language (Khotanese Saka) or the Tocharian language, or an unknown language if they were derived from a local Neolithic group. Many of the cultural traits of the Subeshi people, such as the tall pointed hats, may seriously suggest a Saka origin, but they could also be derived from the earlier Afanasievo culture.

== Artifacts ==
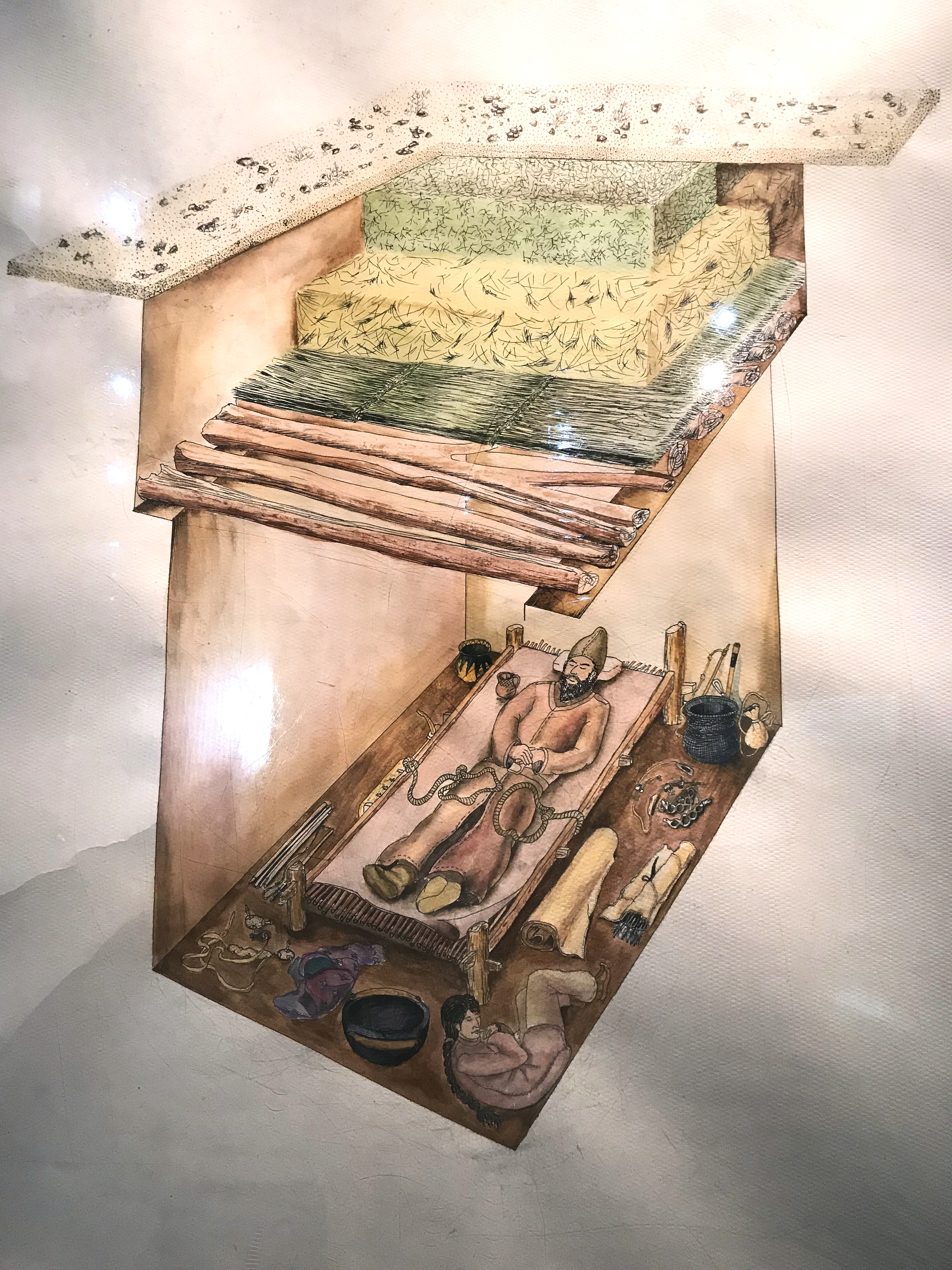
Tomb at Yanghai cemetery

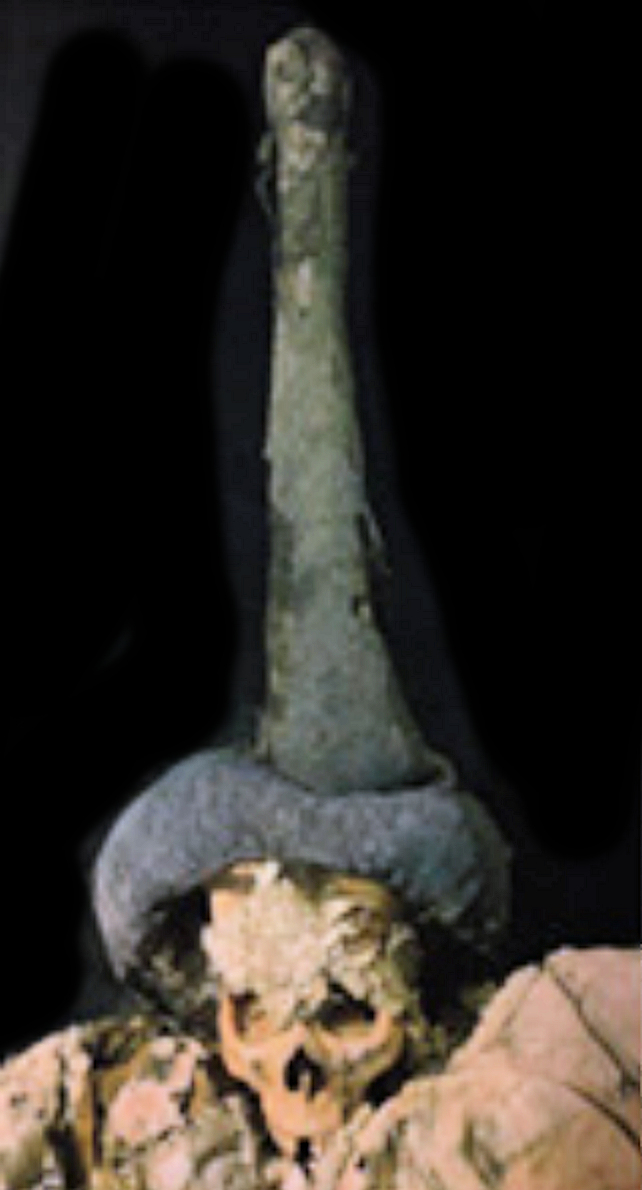
Cone-shaped high-peaked hat, Subeshi cemetery.

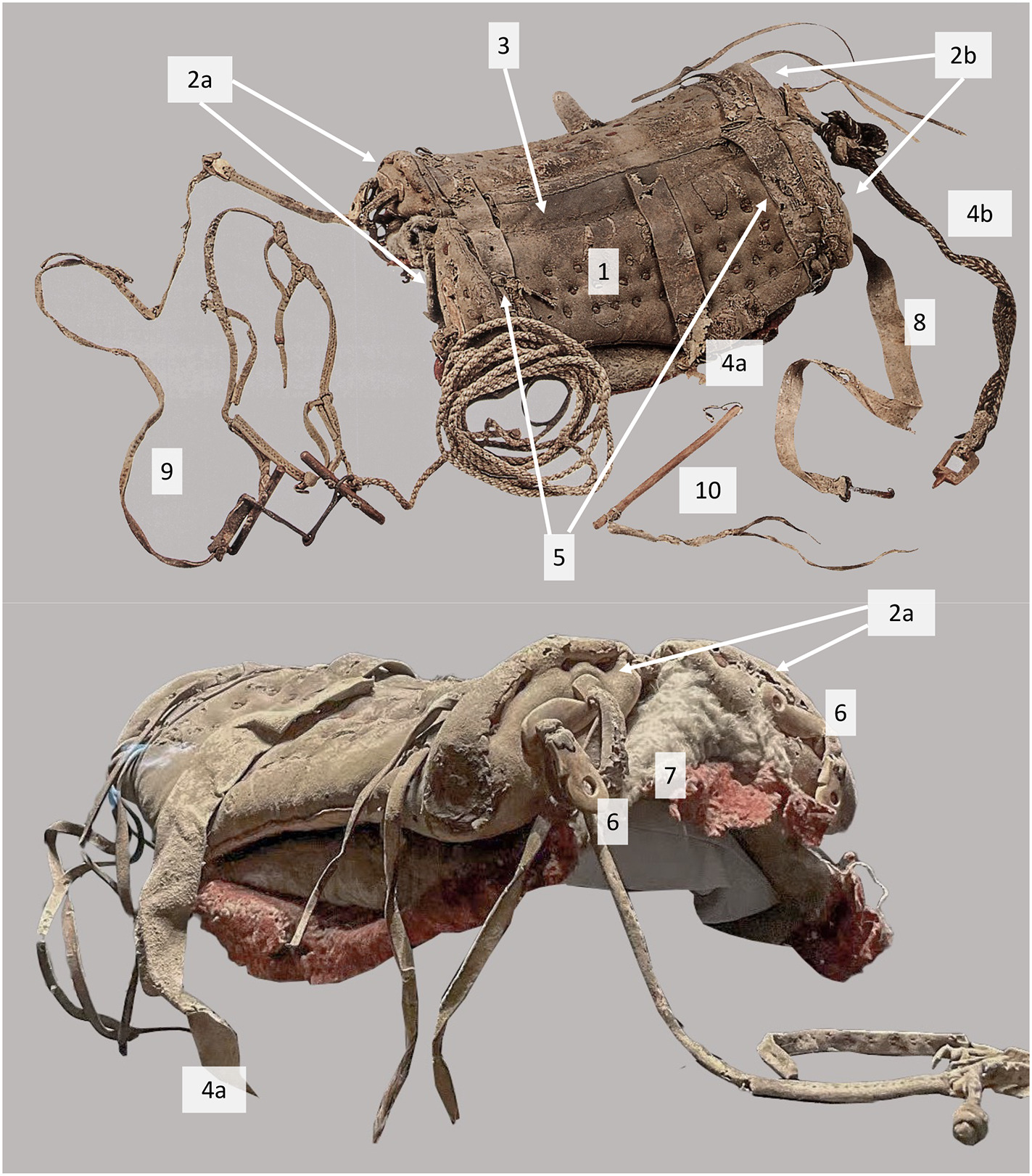
Subeixi horse saddle.

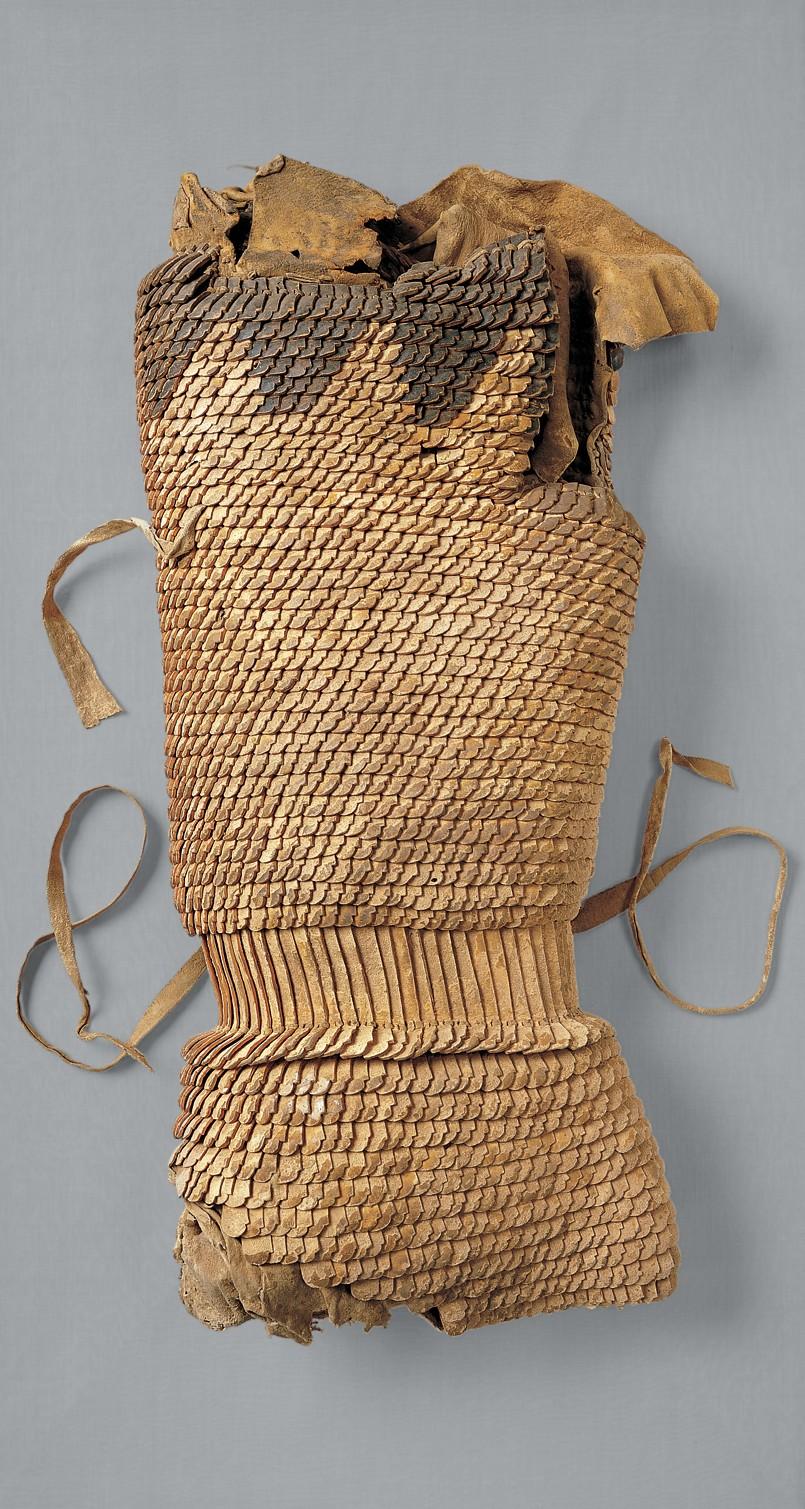
Subeixi or Saka armour, 8th–3rd century BCE.

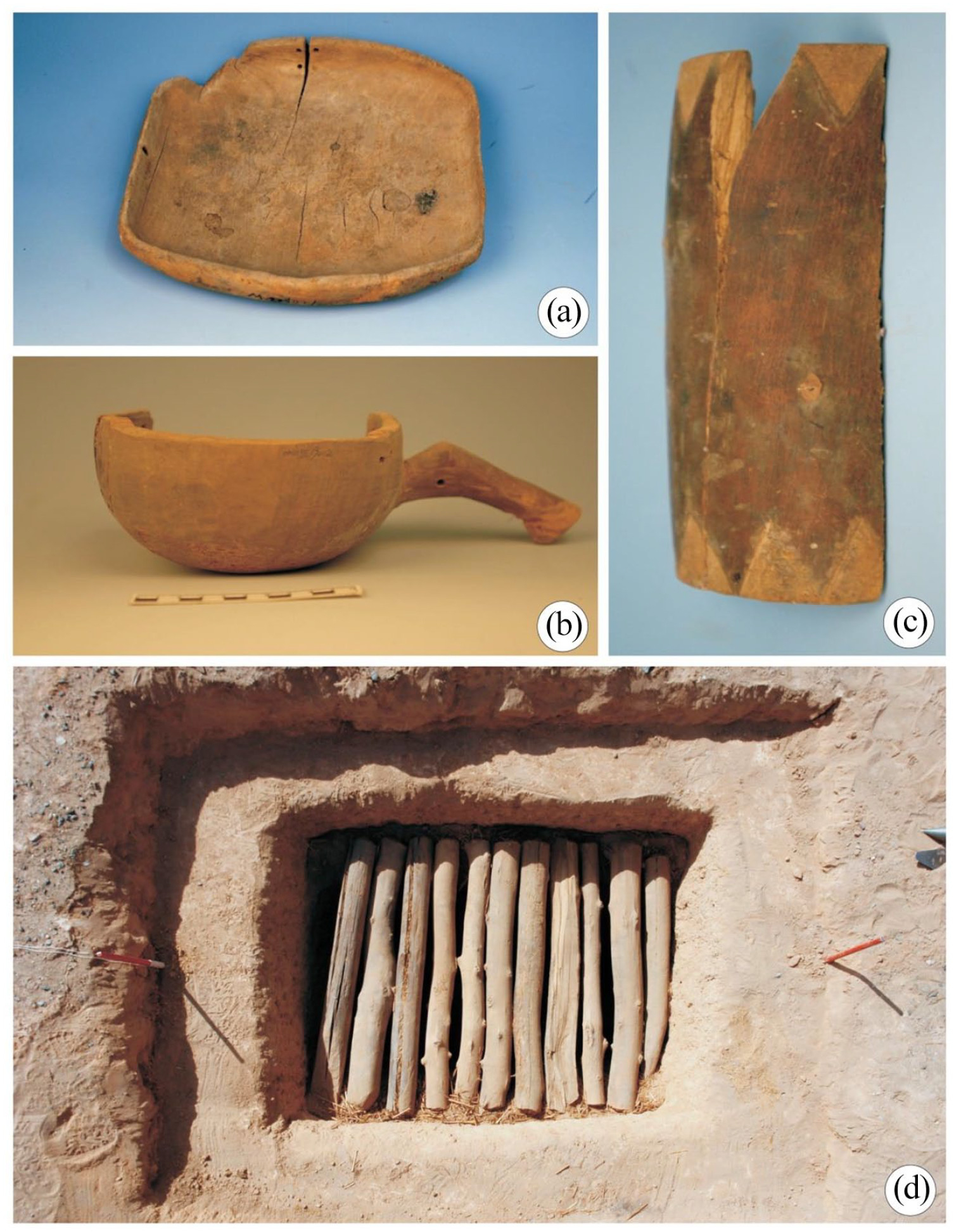
Wooden objects, Yanghai cemetery, Subeshi culture

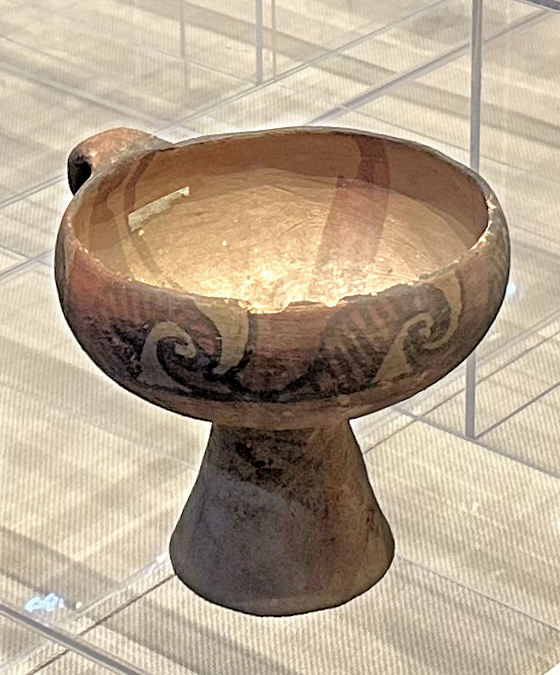
Subeshi culture earthenware. Turpan Museum.

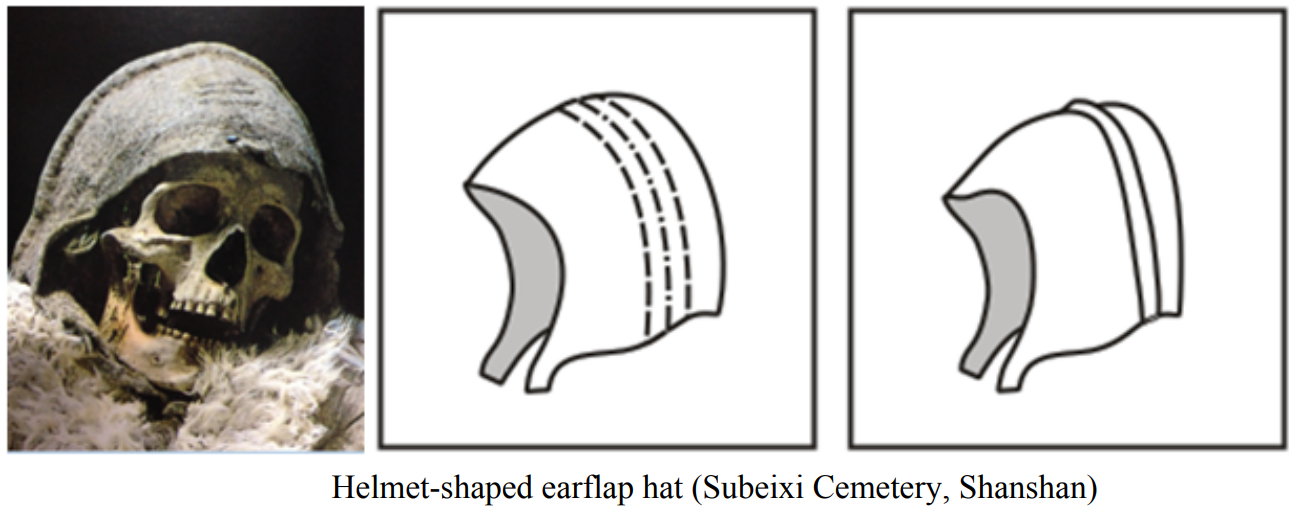
Helmet-shaped earflap hat, Subeshi cemetery.

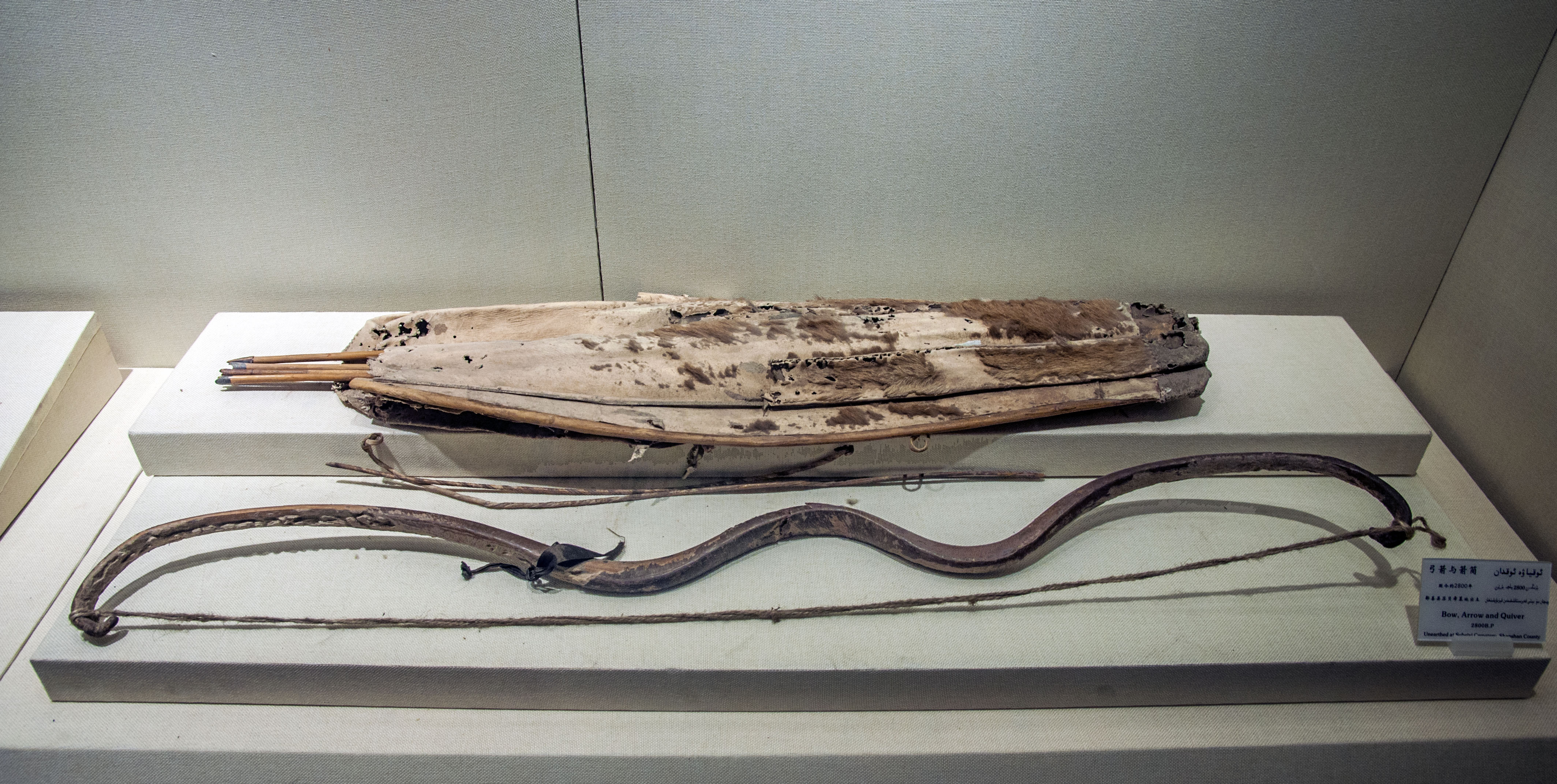
A Subeshi culture bow, c. 800 BCE, Xinjiang Museum

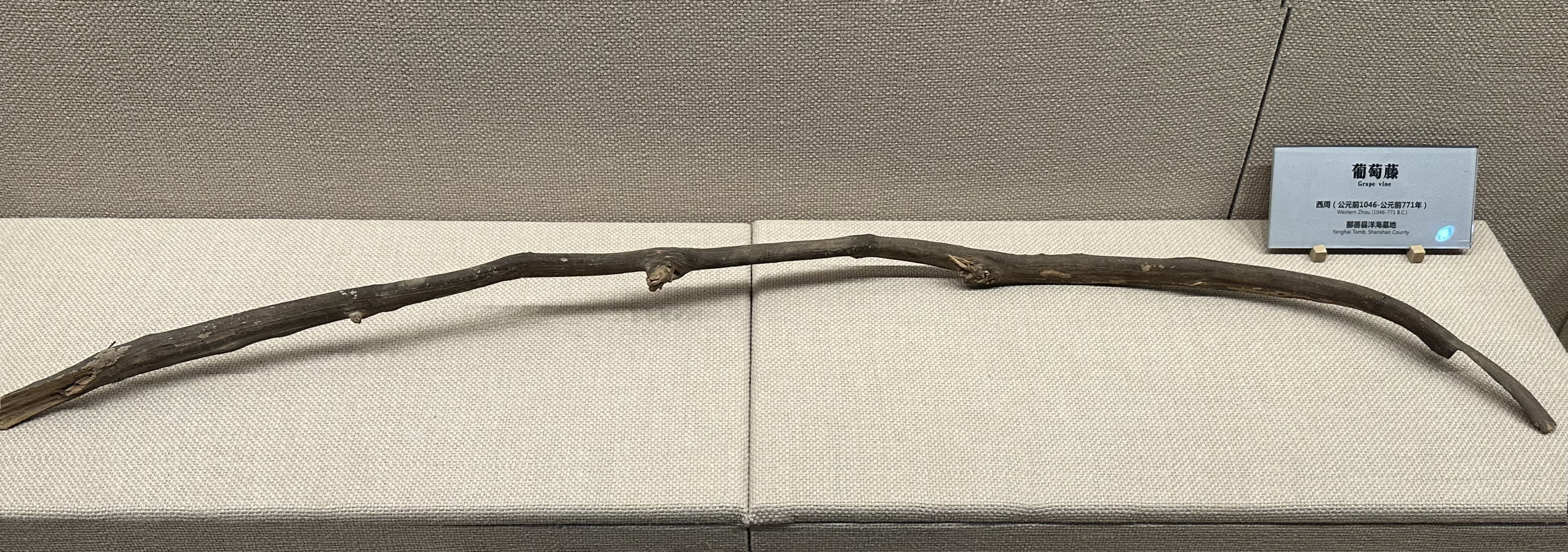
Grapevine from Yanghai, said to be the ancestor of Chinese wine.

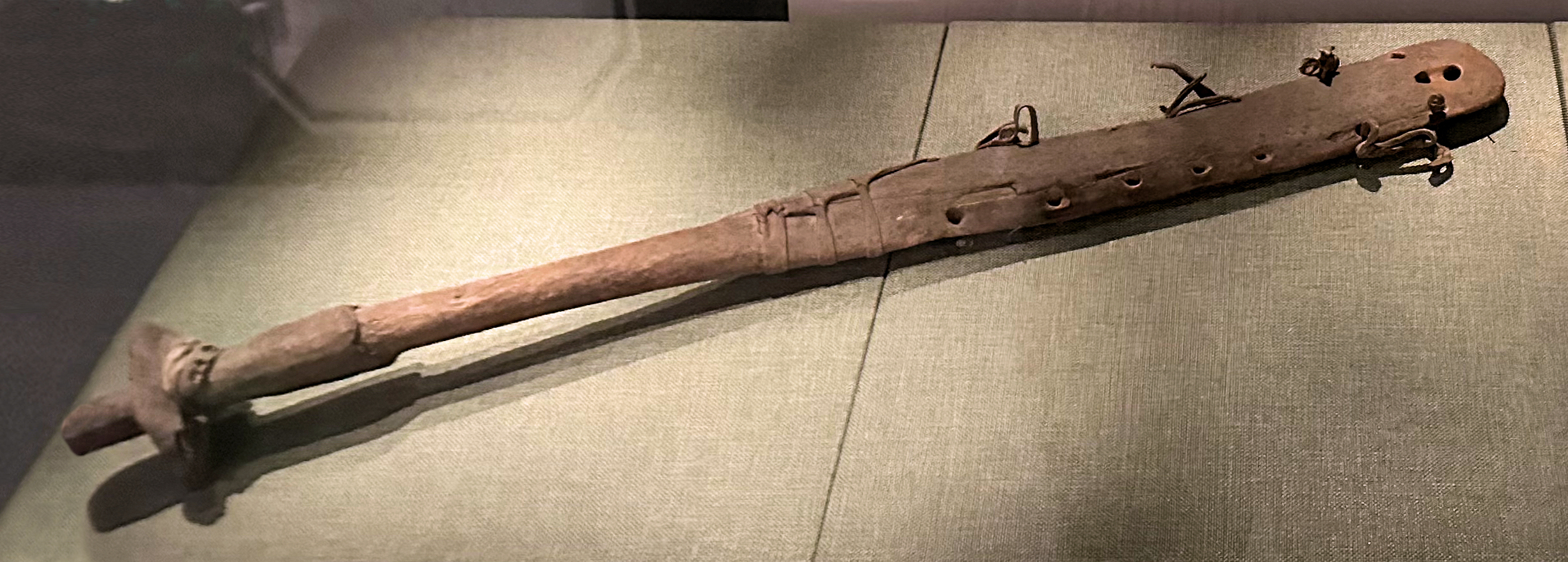
A wooden prosthetic leg from Shengjindian cemetery, c. 300 BCE, Turpan Museum. This is "the oldest functional leg prosthesis known to date".

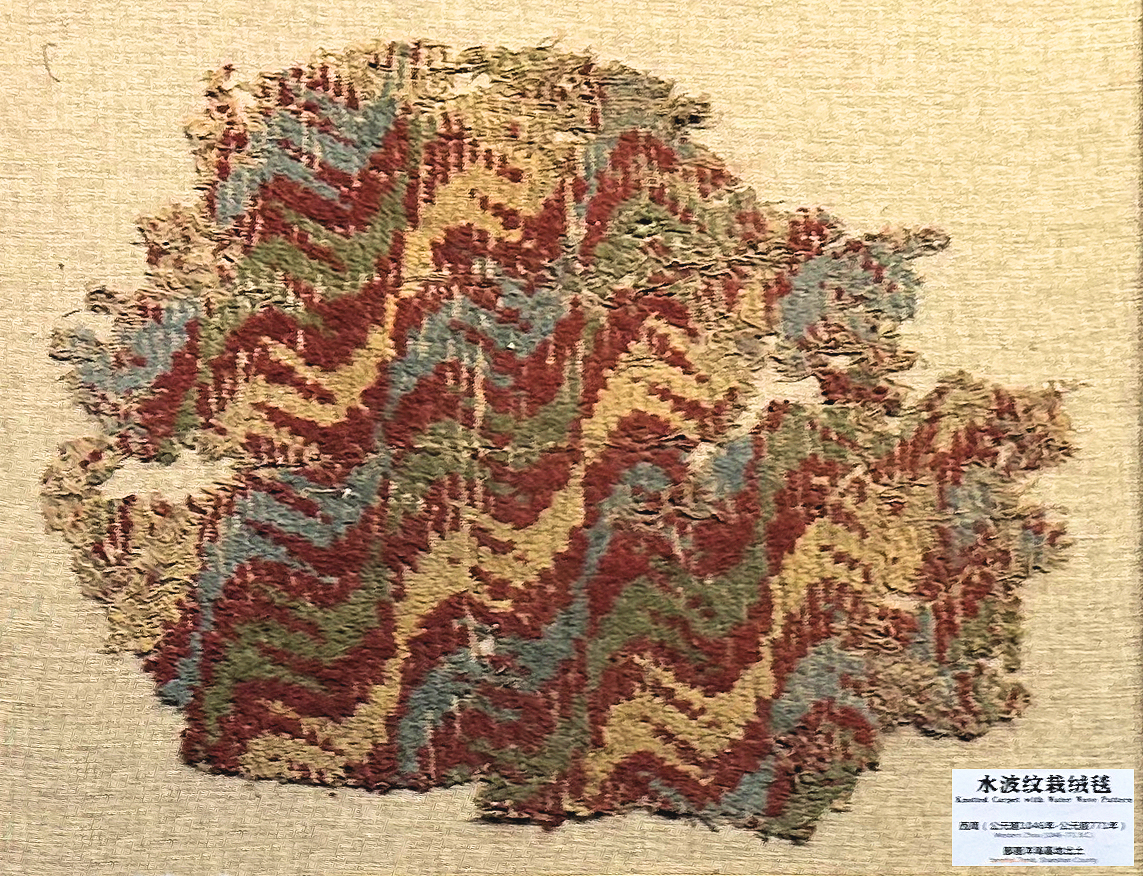
Carpet from Yanghai-1, 7th century BCE.

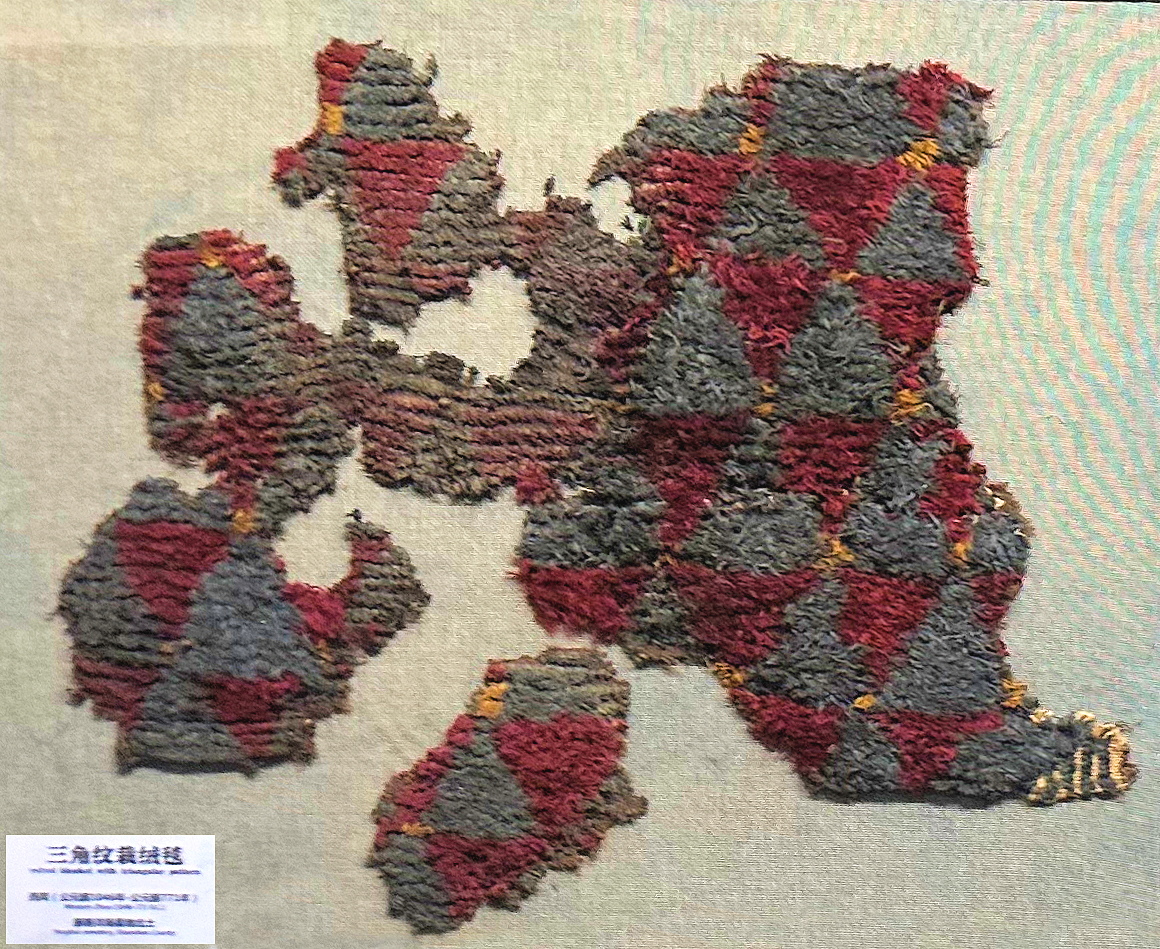
Carpet from Yanghai-1, 7th century BCE.

== See also ==
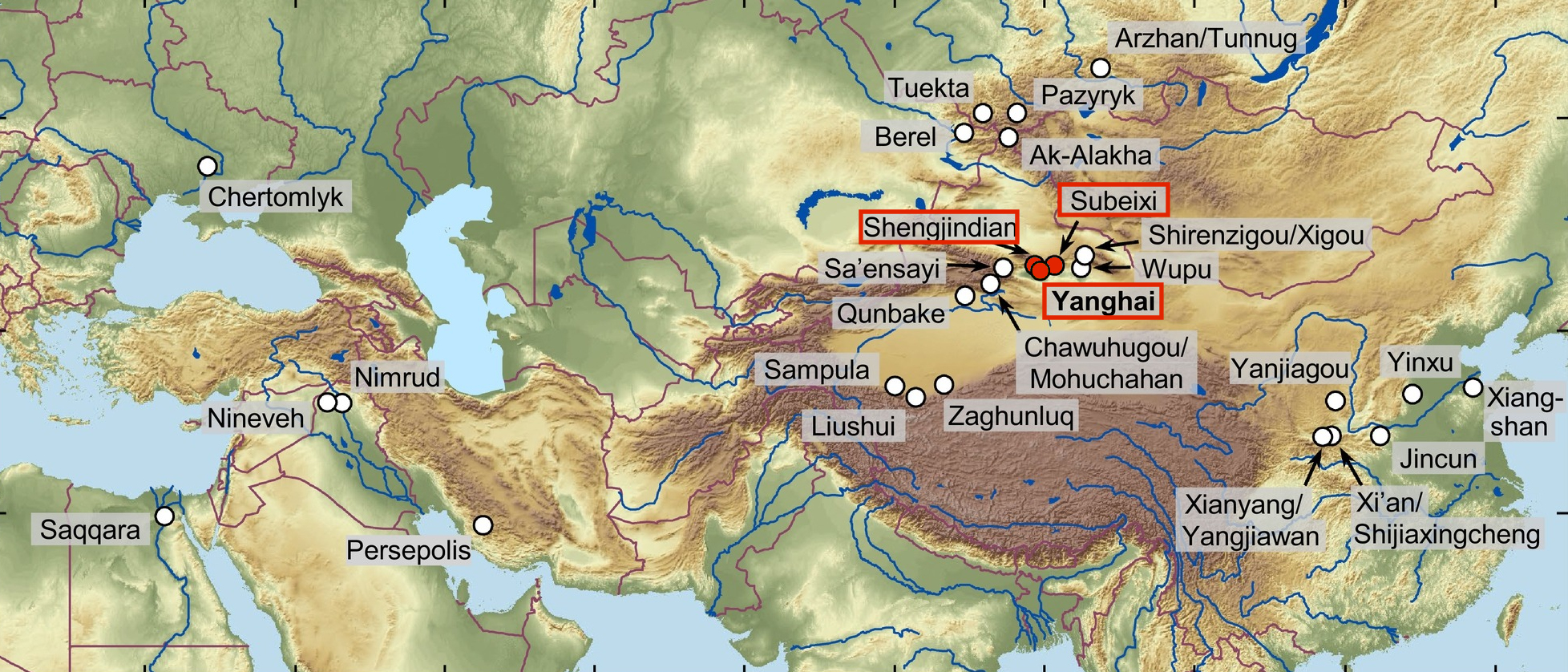
Map of the Subeshi culture sites in the context of Iron Age continental Asia, with main sites of Subeixi, Shengjindian and Yanghai

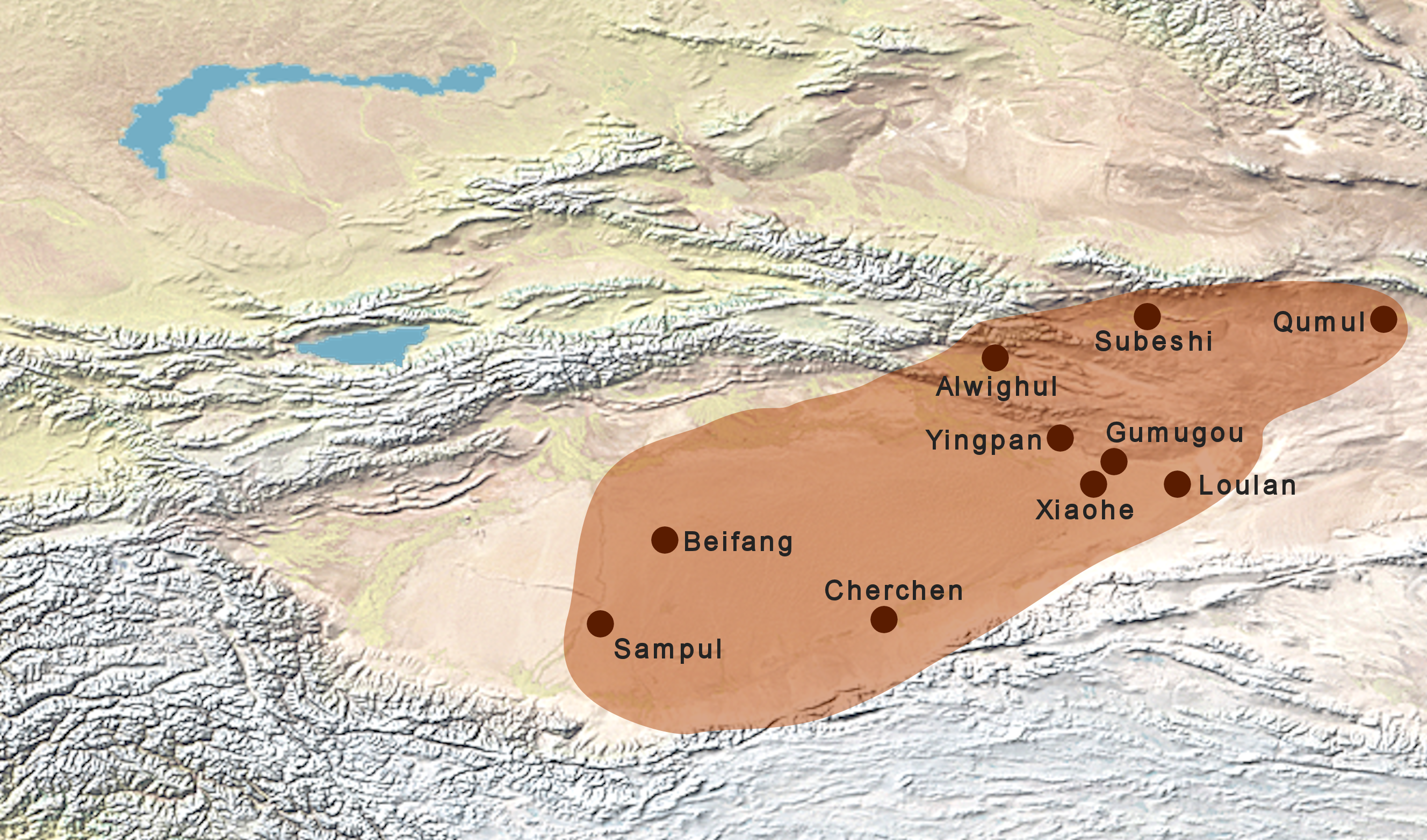
The Subeshi cemetery (at the top) within the general area of the Tarim Mummies

- Astana Cemetery
- Xiaohe Cemetery
- Cherchen Man, an early contemporary from the southern area of the Tarim Basin
