= Jiaohe ruins =

Abandoned city in Xinjiang, China

UNESCO World Heritage Site
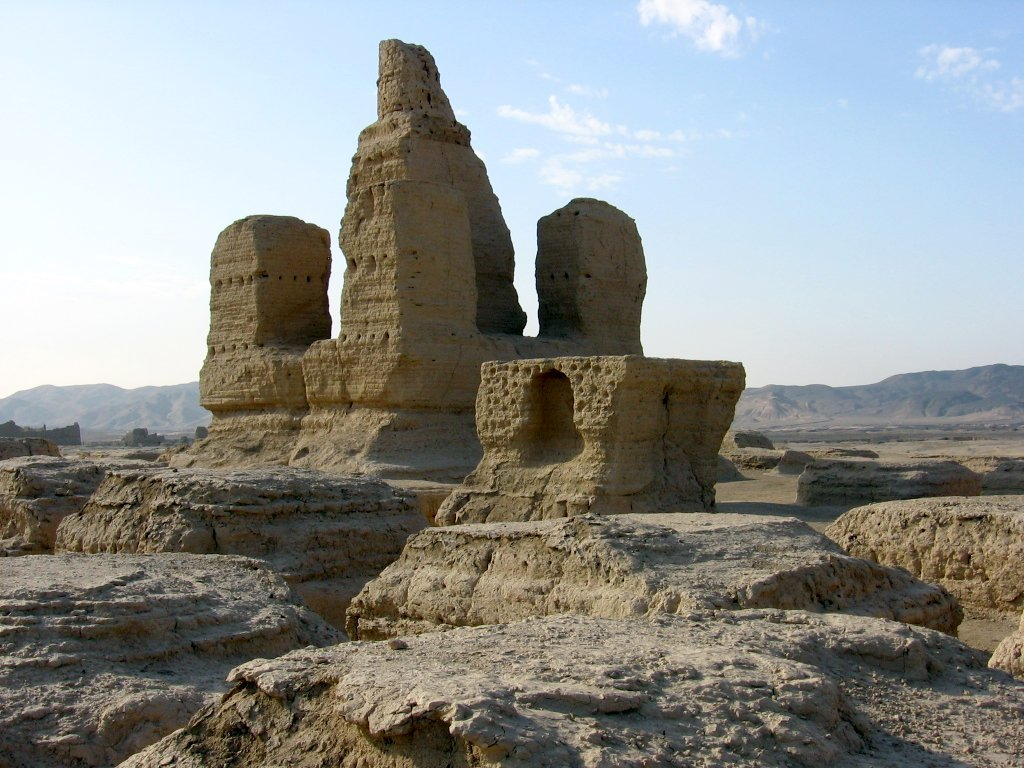
- Buddhist stupa at Jiaohe Ruins.

- Location within Xinjiang
- Location: Turpan, China
- Part of: Silk Roads: the Routes Network of Chang'an-Tianshan Corridor
- Criteria: Cultural: (ii), (iii), (vi)
- Reference: 1442
- Inscription: 2014 (38th Session)
- Area: 680.33 ha (1,681.1 acres)
- Coordinates: 42°57′02″N 89°03′50″E

Chinese name
- Chinese: 交河故城
Transcriptions
Standard Mandarin
- Hanyu Pinyin: Jiāohé gùchéng
- Wade–Giles: Chiao1-he2 ku4-ch'eng2

Uyghur name
- Uyghur: يارغول قەدىمقى شەهىرى
Transcriptions
- Latin Yëziqi: Yarghol qedimki shehiri
- Siril Yëziqi: Ярғол қәдимки шәһири
- Uyghur IPA: [jɑɾˈʁoɫ qædɪmˈkɪ ʃæhɪˈɾɪ]

The Jiaohe ruins, known by the local Uyghur populace as Yarghul, is a ruined city in the Yarnaz Valley, 10 km (6.2 mi) west of the city of Turpan in Xinjiang, China. It was the capital of the Tocharian kingdom of Jushi. It is a natural fortress located atop a steep cliff on a leaf-shaped plateau between two deep river valleys, and was an important stop along the Silk Road.

== Names ==
Although the city was predominantly Tocharian from the early centuries AD until roughly the 9th century—when its native name was likely in use—the original designation has not survived in the historical record, particularly after the city was eventually abandoned. The local Uyghur residents today use the name Yarghul.

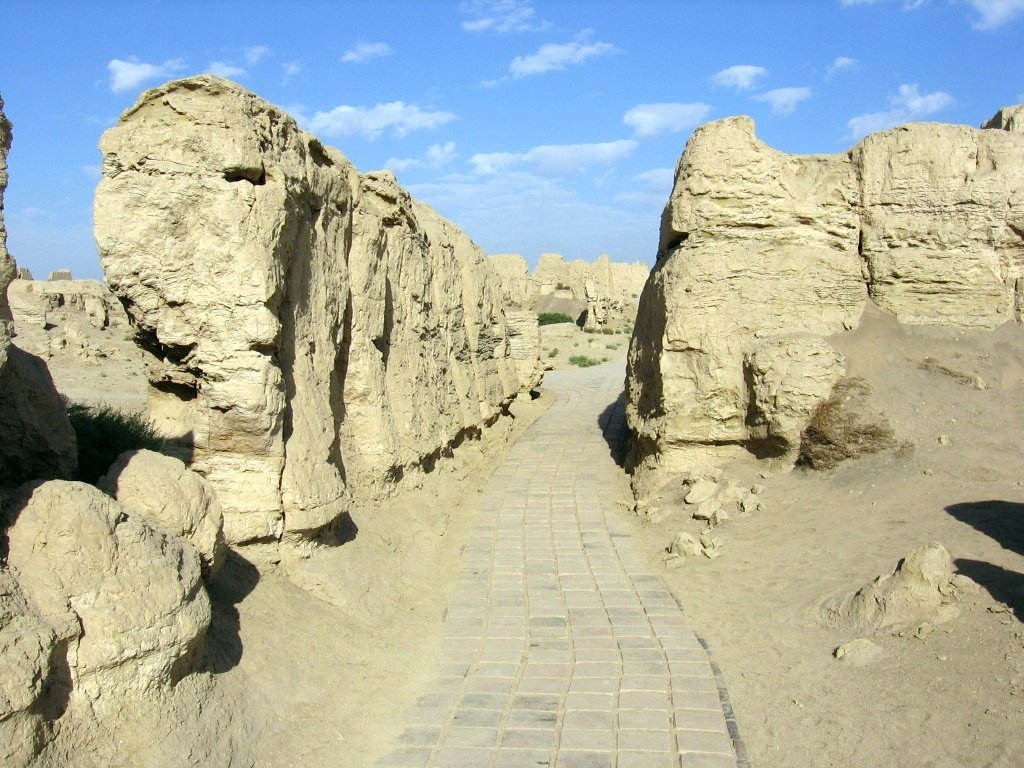
Jiaohe Ruins

The Chinese version of the name 'Jiaohe' appears in historical records. The Hou Hanshu, in discussing Jiaohe, alludes to a conventional reading of the name, as meaning "river junction":

The king of Nearer Jushi lives in the town of Jiaohe. A river divides into two and surrounds the town, which is why it is called Jiaohe.

Lionel Giles recorded the following names for the city (with his Wade-Giles forms of the Chinese names substituted with pinyin):

Jiaohe, ancient capital of Turfan [Han].
Jushi Qianwangting (Royal Court of Anterior/Nearer Jushi) [Later Han]
Gaochang Jun [Jin]
Xi Zhou [Tang]
Yarkhoto [modern name].

Aurel Stein has suggested that the name Yarkhoto is a combination of Turkic and Mongolian words, being derived from yar (Turki: ravine) and khoto (Mongolian: town).

== History ==
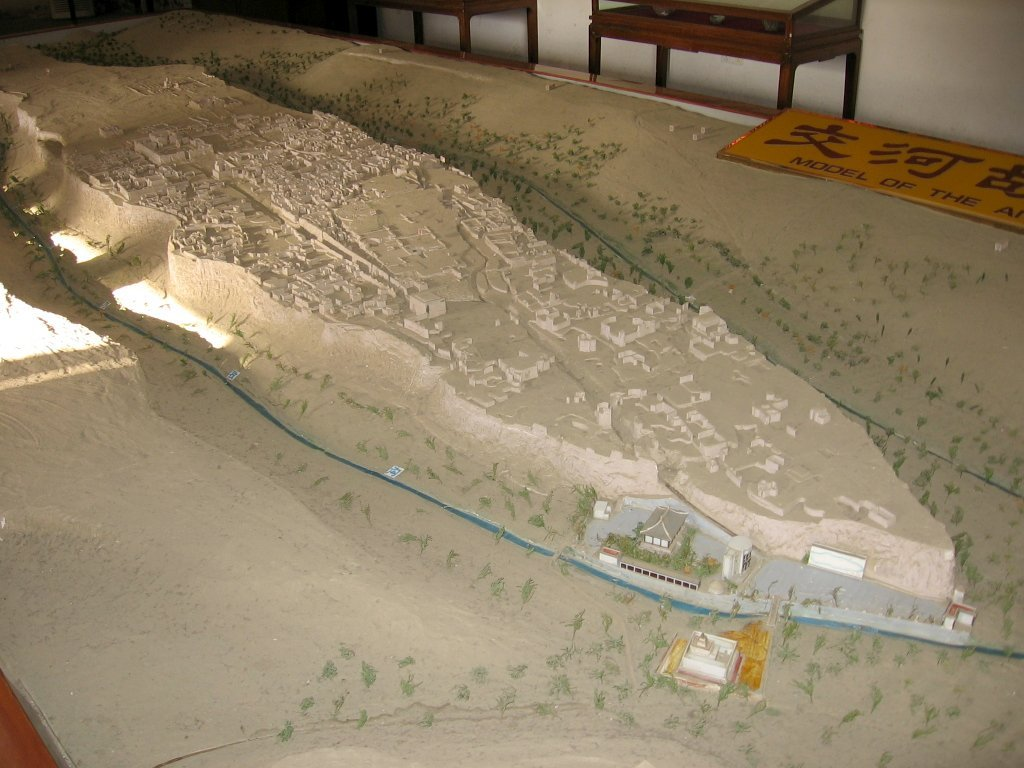
Model of the plateau on which Jiaohe is located

From 108 BC to 450 AD Jiaohe was the capital of the Anterior Jushi Kingdom. It was an important site along the Silk Road trade route leading west, and was adjacent to the Korla and Karasahr kingdoms to the west. From 450 AD until 640 AD it became Jiao prefecture in the Tang dynasty, and in 640 AD it was made the seat of the new Jiaohe County. From 640 AD until 658 AD it was also the seat of the Protector General of the Western Regions, the highest level military post of a Chinese military commander posted in the west. Since the beginning of the 9th century it had become Jiaohe prefecture of the Uyghur Khaganate, until their kingdom was conquered by the Kyrgyz soon after in the year 840. Yarkhoto was also built on a plateau and this plateau is 30m high.

The city was built on a large islet (1650 m in length, 300 m wide at its widest point) in the middle of a river which formed natural defenses, which would explain why the city lacked any sort of walls. Instead, steep cliffs more than 30 metres high on all sides of the river acted as natural walls. The layout of the city had eastern and western residential districts, while the northern district was reserved for Buddhist sites of temples and stupas. Along with this there are notable graveyards and the ruins of a large government office in the southern part of the eastern district. It had a population of 7,000 according to Tang dynasty records.

It was finally abandoned after its destruction during an invasion by the Mongols led by Genghis Khan in the 13th century.

The ruins were visited by the archaeologist and explorer Aurel Stein, who described "a maze of ruined dwellings and shrines carved out for the most part from the loess soil", but complained that a combination of local farmers' use of the soil and government interference in his activities prevented examination. The site was partially excavated in the 1950s and has been protected by the government of China since 1961. There are now attempts to protect this site and other Silk Road city ruins.

== Conservation ==
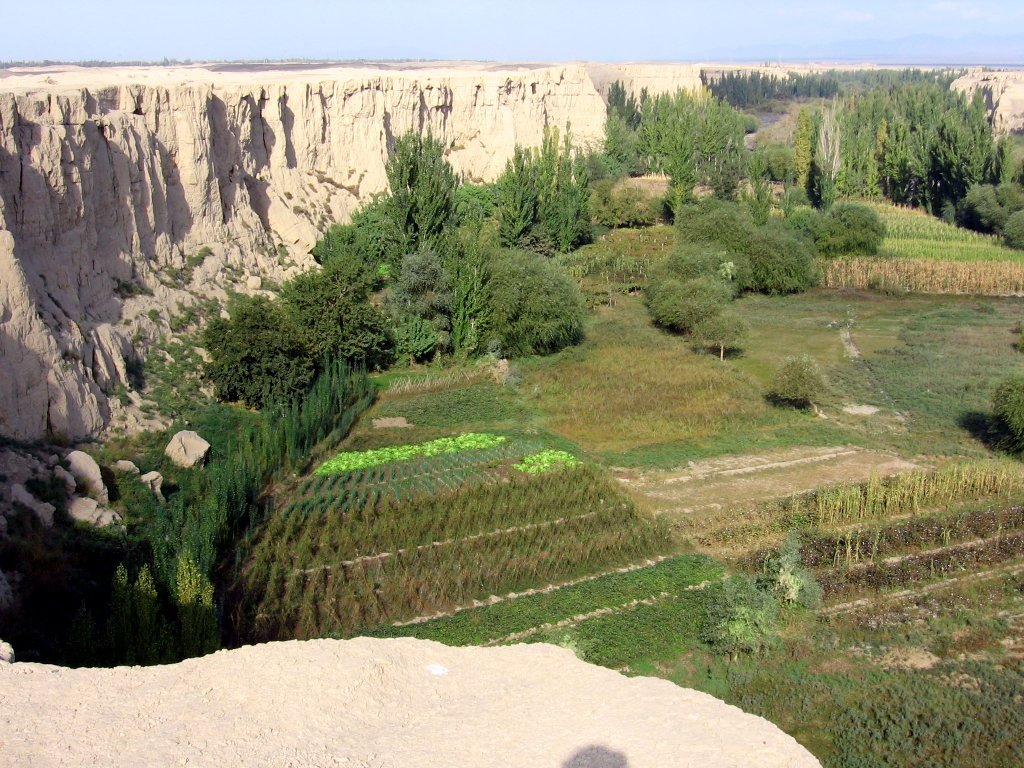
Landscape at the foot of the plateau on which Jiaohe is located

Both the Nara National Cultural Properties Research Institute and the Xinjiang Cultural Relics Bureau have been cooperating in a joint venture to preserve the ruins of the site since 1992. In 2014, the Jiaohe Ruins became part of the Silk Road UNESCO World Heritage Sites, after several years of preparation.

== See also ==
- Gaochang ruins
- Tocharian languages
- Silk Road transmission of Buddhism
- Major national historical and cultural sites (Xinjiang)
