= Turpan Museum =

Museum in Turpan, China

Coordinates: 42.941274°N 89.188552°E

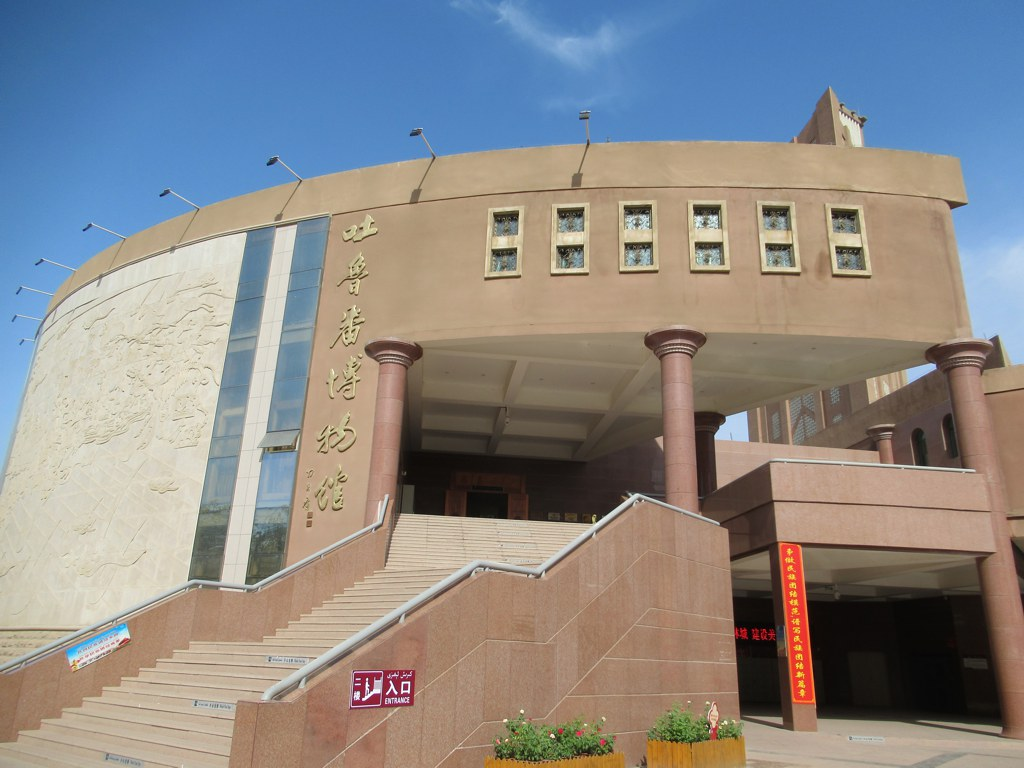
Turpan Museum

Turpan Museum (Chinese: 吐魯番博物館) is a museum in Turpan, Xinjiang, China. It has items from the Tang dynasty excavated from the Astana Graves which are located outside the town. Items include ancient silks, clothes and preserved corpses.

== See also ==
- List of museums in China
- Silk Road transmission of Buddhism
